= List of members of the Folketing, 2026–present =

72nd Folketing
- Term: 24 March 2026 –
- Speaker: M Henrik Frandsen
- Prime Minister: A Mette Frederiksen
- Cabinet: Frederiksen III
- Previous: 2022–2026

This is a list of the 179 members of the Folketing in the 2026 session. They were elected at the 2026 Danish general election.

== Parliament members elected at the March 2026 election ==
The list of new or re-elected parliament members.

Name	Personal votes	Party	Constituency
Mette Frederiksen	41,721	A Social Democrats	North Jutland
Nicolai Wammen	19,203	A Social Democrats	East Jutland
Magnus Heunicke	14,316	A Social Democrats	Zealand
Bjørn Brandenborg	12,098	A Social Democrats	Funen
Mattias Tesfaye	11,898	A Social Democrats	Copenhagen
Peter Hummelgaard	11,637	A Social Democrats	Copenhagen
Ida Auken	11,286	A Social Democrats	Greater Copenhagen
Simon Kollerup	9,050	A Social Democrats	North Jutland
Trine Bramsen	8,112	A Social Democrats	Funen
Christian Rabjerg Madsen	7,844	A Social Democrats	South Jutland
Benny Engelbrecht	7,275	A Social Democrats	South Jutland
Mogens Jensen	7,010	A Social Democrats	West Jutland
Ane Halsboe-Jørgensen	6,864	A Social Democrats	North Jutland
Leif Lahn Jensen	6,837	A Social Democrats	East Jutland
Frederik Vad	6,763	A Social Democrats	Zealand
Anne Paulin	6,742	A Social Democrats	West Jutland
Birgitte Vind	6,220	A Social Democrats	South Jutland
Jesper Petersen	6,188	A Social Democrats	South Jutland
Camilla Fabricius	5,876	A Social Democrats	East Jutland
Kaare Dybvad Bek	5,848	A Social Democrats	Zealand
Flemming Møller Mortensen	5,824	A Social Democrats	North Jutland
Fie Hækkerup	5,763	A Social Democrats	North Zealand
Anders Kronborg	5,728	A Social Democrats	South Jutland
Morten Bødskov	5,643	A Social Democrats	Greater Copenhagen
Jeppe Bruus	5,501	A Social Democrats	Funen
Katrine Evelyn Jensen	4,721	A Social Democrats	West Jutland
Thomas Monberg	4,652	A Social Democrats	East Jutland
Rasmus Stoklund	4,528	A Social Democrats	North Zealand
Kasper Roug	4,476	A Social Democrats	Zealand
Sofie de Bretteville	4,431	A Social Democrats	Greater Copenhagen
Malte Larsen	4,365	A Social Democrats	Zealand
Thomas Skriver Jensen	4,231	A Social Democrats	Funen
Thomas Klimek	4,116	A Social Democrats	North Zealand
Trine Birk Andersen	4,106	A Social Democrats	Zealand
Anders Kühnau	4,043	A Social Democrats	East Jutland
Matilde Powers	4,030	A Social Democrats	North Zealand
Lea Wermelin	3,837	A Social Democrats	Bornholm
Sophie Hæstorp Andersen	2,187	A Social Democrats	Copenhagen
Pia Olsen Dyhr	29,344	F Green Left	Zealand
Signe Munk	13,806	F Green Left	West Jutland
Jacob Mark	12,139	F Green Left	North Zealand
Kirsten Normann Andersen	9,526	F Green Left	East Jutland
Karina Lorentzen Dehnhardt	8,246	F Green Left	South Jutland
Lisbeth Bech-Nielsen	5,494	F Green Left	Copenhagen
Karsten Hønge	5,373	F Green Left	Zealand
Lise Müller	4,732	F Green Left	Funen
Theresa Berg Andersen	4,623	F Green Left	North Jutland
Sofie Lippert	4,516	F Green Left	East Jutland
Charlotte Broman Mølbæk	4,356	F Green Left	East Jutland
Nanna Bonde	4,166	F Green Left	Copenhagen
Sigurd Agersnap	3,546	F Green Left	Greater Copenhagen
Sofie F. Villadsen	3,349	F Green Left	Greater Copenhagen
Carl Valentin (politician)	3,271	F Green Left	Copenhagen
Christina Lykke	3,260	F Green Left	North Jutland
Marianne Bigum	2,384	F Green Left	North Zealand
Astrid Carøe	1,895	F Green Left	Zealand
Anne Valentina Berthelsen	4,357	F Green Left	Zealand
Jørgen Kvist	1,197	F Green Left	South Jutland
Stephanie Lose	31,008	V Venstre	South Jutland
Troels Lund Poulsen	19,857	V Venstre	East Jutland
Søren Gade	15,775	V Venstre	West Jutland
Marie Bjerre	15,319	V Venstre	North Jutland
Preben Bang Henriksen	11,947	V Venstre	North Jutland
Morten Dahlin	7,021	V Venstre	Zealand
Sophie Løhde	6,784	V Venstre	North Zealand
Anni Matthiesen	6,339	V Venstre	South Jutland
Thomas Danielsen	5,966	V Venstre	West Jutland
Trine Jepsen	4,921	V Venstre	West Jutland
Marlene Ambo-Rasmussen	4,791	V Venstre	Funen
Jacob Jensen	4,265	V Venstre	Zealand
Christoffer Aagaard Melson	4,074	V Venstre	South Jutland
Louise Louring	3,355	V Venstre	East Jutland
Amanda Heitmann	3,202	V Venstre	Funen
Peter Juel-Jensen	3,017	V Venstre	Bornholm
Marie Brixtofte	2,827	V Venstre	Greater Copenhagen
Mathilde Hjort Bressum	2,317	V Venstre	East Jutland
Alex Vanopslagh	38,487	I Liberal Alliance	East Jutland
Sólbjørg Jakobsen	7,618	I Liberal Alliance	North Jutland
Pernille Vermund	5,751	I Liberal Alliance	Zealand
Mads Strange	4,488	I Liberal Alliance	Copenhagen
Ole Birk Olesen	2,886	I Liberal Alliance	Copenhagen
Cecilie Liv Hansen	2,569	I Liberal Alliance	South Jutland
Helena Artmann Andresen	2,387	I Liberal Alliance	South Jutland
Jens Meilvang	2,385	I Liberal Alliance	East Jutland
Katrine Daugaard	2,375	I Liberal Alliance	Funen
Carsten Bach	2,315	I Liberal Alliance	West Jutland
Steffen W. Frølund	1,868	I Liberal Alliance	North Zealand
Thorbjørn Jacobsen	1,836	I Liberal Alliance	West Jutland
Lars-Christian Brask	1,691	I Liberal Alliance	Zealand
Freja Brandhøj	1,566	I Liberal Alliance	Greater Copenhagen
Peter Larsen	1,493	I Liberal Alliance	North Jutland
Joachim Riis	965	I Liberal Alliance	Zealand
Morten Messerschmidt	50,819	O Danish People's Party	Greater Copenhagen
Peter Kofod	15,993	O Danish People's Party	South Jutland
Nick Zimmermann	6,007	O Danish People's Party	East Jutland
Mikkel Bjørn	5,746	O Danish People's Party	Greater Copenhagen
Mette Thiesen	4,555	O Danish People's Party	North Zealand
Anders Vistisen	4,031	O Danish People's Party	North Jutland
Alex Ahrendtsen	3,281	O Danish People's Party	Funen
Søren Boel Olesen	2,446	O Danish People's Party	West Jutland
Michael Nedersøe	2,075	O Danish People's Party	East Jutland
Allan Feldt	1,679	O Danish People's Party	Copenhagen
Malte Larsen	1,036	O Danish People's Party	Zealand
Rune Bønnelykke	814	O Danish People's Party	South Jutland
Julie Jacobsen	768	O Danish People's Party	Zealand
Mikkel Dencker	750	O Danish People's Party	Greater Copenhagen
Josephine Alstrup Kofod	734	O Danish People's Party	South Jutland
Jan Herskov	460	O Danish People's Party	Zealand
Lars Løkke Rasmussen	34,636	M Moderates	Zealand
Jakob Engel-Schmidt	8,132	M Moderates	Copenhagen
Lars Aagaard	5,685	M Moderates	Funen
Monika Rubin	4,633	M Moderates	Greater Copenhagen
Henrik Frandsen	4,471	M Moderates	South Jutland
Caroline Stage	3,751	M Moderates	East Jutland
Rasmus Lund-Nielsen	3,574	M Moderates	North Zealand
Christina Egelund	3,549	M Moderates	East Jutland
Frida Bruun	3,193	M Moderates	South Jutland
Charlotte Bagge Hansen	1,909	M Moderates	Zealand
Mohammad Rona	1,604	M Moderates	North Jutland
Morten E. G. Brautsch	1,585	M Moderates	West Jutland
Ellen Emilie	1,175	M Moderates	Copenhagen
Pernille Christensen	885	M Moderates	North Zealand
Mona Juul	21,594	C Conservatives	East Jutland
Mette Abildgaard	10,807	C Conservatives	North Zealand
Lise Bertelsen	6,290	C Conservatives	West Jutland
Mai Mercado	6,146	C Conservatives	Funen
Marcus Knuth	4,394	C Conservatives	Zealand
Christian Vigilius	4,295	C Conservatives	Greater Copenhagen
Birgitte Bergman	3,176	C Conservatives	North Zealand
Anders Storgaard	3,099	C Conservatives	Copenhagen
Helle Bonnesen	2,852	C Conservatives	Copenhagen
Sofie Therese Svendsen	2,488	C Conservatives	North Zealand
Frederik Bloch Münster	2,081	C Conservatives	South Jutland
Rune Kristensen	1,880	C Conservatives	Zealand
Charlotte Green	1,489	C Conservatives	East Jutland
Pelle Dragsted	30,707	Ø Red–Green Alliance	Copenhagen
Rosa Lund	8,621	Ø Red–Green Alliance	Copenhagen
Victoria Velásquez	4,973	Ø Red–Green Alliance	Funen
Trine Mach	3,397	Ø Red–Green Alliance	East Jutland
Eva Flyvholm	2,822	Ø Red–Green Alliance	Zealand
Ibrahim Benli	2,740	Ø Red–Green Alliance	Greater Copenhagen
Peder Hvelplund	2,296	Ø Red–Green Alliance	North Jutland
Leila Stockmarr	1,969	Ø Red–Green Alliance	Copenhagen
Sinem Dybvad Demir	1,318	Ø Red–Green Alliance	North Zealand
Rasmus Vestergaard Madsen	856	Ø Red–Green Alliance	South Jutland
Lisbeth Torfing	644	Ø Red–Green Alliance	West Jutland
Samira Nawa	10,372	B Social Liberal Party	Copenhagen
Martin Lidegaard	9,328	B Social Liberal Party	North Zealand
Katrine Robsøe	6,406	B Social Liberal Party	East Jutland
Magnus Georg Jensen	4,491	B Social Liberal Party	Copenhagen
Zenia Stampe	4,242	B Social Liberal Party	Zealand
Thomas Rohden	4,136	B Social Liberal Party	Copenhagen
Stinus Lindgreen	2,837	B Social Liberal Party	Greater Copenhagen
Anastasia Milthers	2,393	B Social Liberal Party	Funen
Philip Vivet	1,443	B Social Liberal Party	West Jutland
Steffen Holme Helledie	1,124	B Social Liberal Party	Copenhagen
Inger Støjberg	29,995	Æ Denmark Democrats	North Jutland
Mads Fuglede	5,806	Æ Denmark Democrats	West Jutland
Dennis Flydtkjær	4,360	Æ Denmark Democrats	West Jutland
Karina Adsbøl	2,370	Æ Denmark Democrats	South Jutland
Ulrik Knudsen	2,023	Æ Denmark Democrats	South Jutland
Susie Jessen	1,946	Æ Denmark Democrats	Zealand
Hans Kristian Skibby	1,818	Æ Denmark Democrats	East Jutland
Kim Edberg Andersen	1,791	Æ Denmark Democrats	North Jutland
Jens Henrik Thulesen Dahl	1,447	Æ Denmark Democrats	Funen
Marlene Harpsøe	575	Æ Denmark Democrats	North Zealand
Franciska Rosenkilde	11,385	Å The Alternative	Copenhagen
Signe Wenneberg	3,349	Å The Alternative	Greater Copenhagen
Torsten Gejl	3,316	Å The Alternative	East Jutland
Elise Sydendal	1,298	Å The Alternative	Zealand
Anna Bjerre	1,194	Å The Alternative	North Jutland
Lars Boje Mathiesen	8,408	H Citizens' Party	East Jutland
Jacob Harris	2,307	H Citizens' Party	Zealand
Nadja Natalie Isaksen	1,301	H Citizens' Party	South Jutland
Emilie Schytte	533	H Citizens' Party	North Zealand

== Party and member changes after the March 2026 election ==
=== Party changes ===
Below are all parliament members that have joined another party or become independent during the term.

Name	Shift from	Shift to	Date	Ref.
Jacob Harris	H Citizens' Party	. Independent	28 March 2026	
Cecilie Liv Hansen	I Liberal Alliance	. Independent	28 March 2026	
Emilie Schytte	H Citizens' Party	. Independent	4 April 2026	
Nadja Natalie Isaksen	H Citizens' Party	. Independent	2 May 2026	
Preben Bang Henriksen	V Venstre	. Independent	27 October 2026	

=== Lasting member changes ===
Below are member changes that will last through the entire term.

Incoming MP	Party	Outgoing MP	Date	Reason	Ref.
Erik Flyvholm	V Venstre	Søren Gade	22 October 2026	Disagreement with party line.	
