= Julie Jacobsen =

Julie Jacobsen may refer to:

- Julie Jacobsen (politician) (born 1985), Danish politician
- Julie Bøe Jacobsen (born 1998), Norwegian handballer

== See also ==
- Julie Dawall Jakobsen (born 1998), Danish badminton player
