= Charlotte Green (politician) =

Danish politician

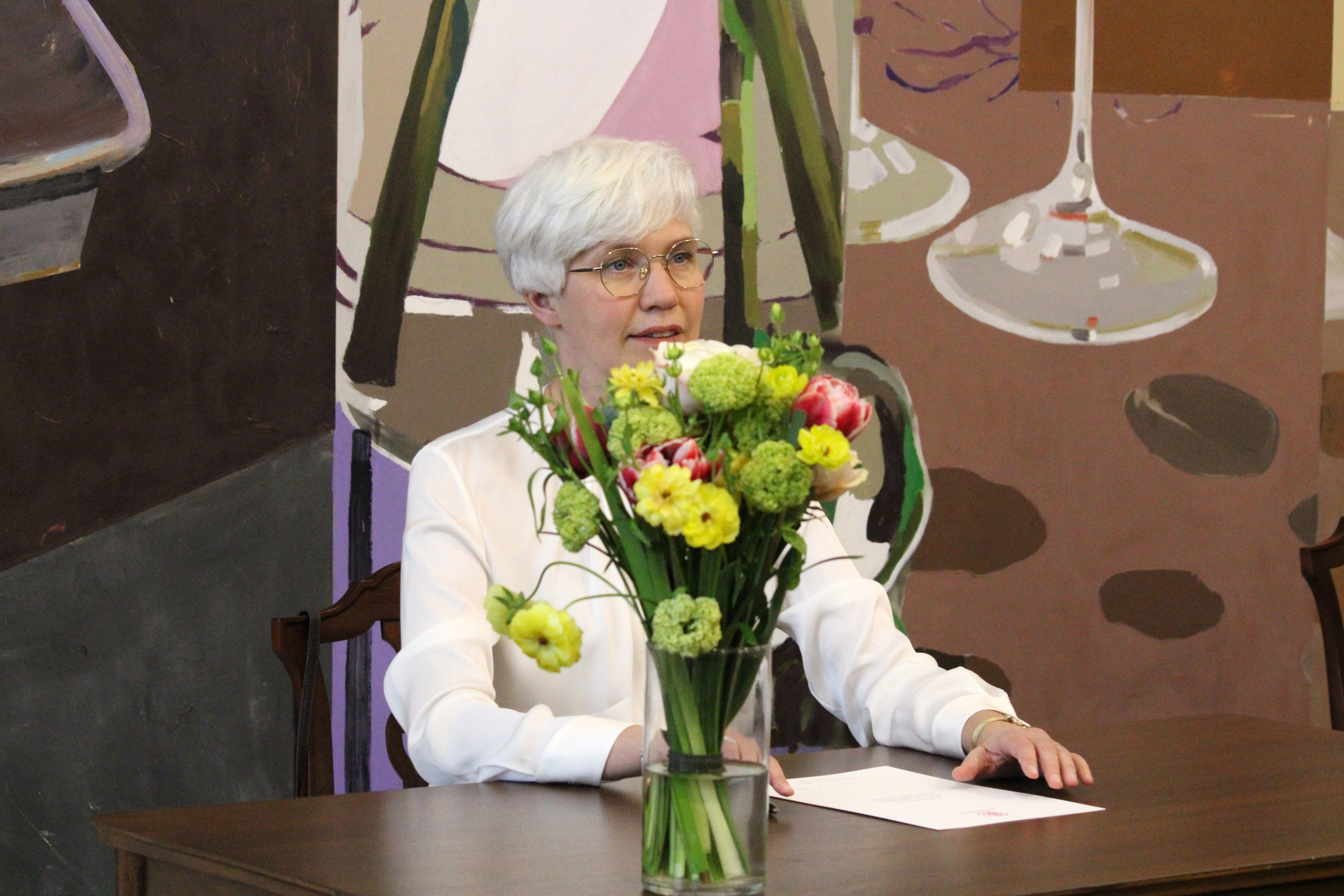
- Green in 2026

Member of the Folketing
- Incumbent
- Assuming office 6 May 2026
- Constituency: East Jutland

Personal details
- Born: 18 June 1974 (age 52)
- Party: Conservative People's Party
- Website: charlotte-green.dk

Charlotte Green (born 6 May 1974) is a Danish politician from the Conservative People's Party. She was elected to the Folketing in 2026.

Green was the group chairwoman of the conservative council group in Favrskov City Council.

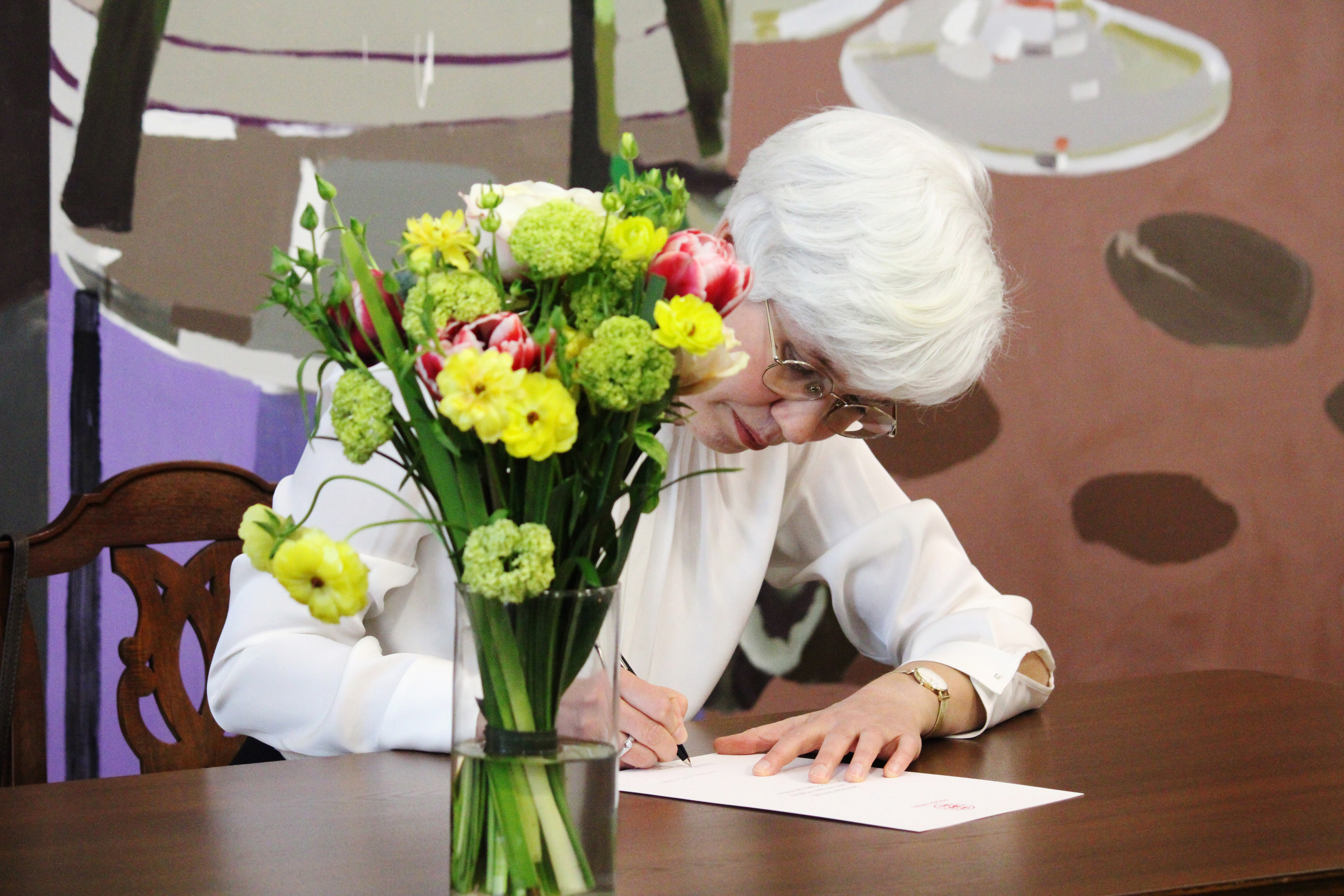
Green signing a pledge to uphold the Danish Constitution at Christiansborg, 14 April 2026

== See also ==
- List of members of the Folketing, 2026–present
