= Søren Boel Olesen =

Danish politician

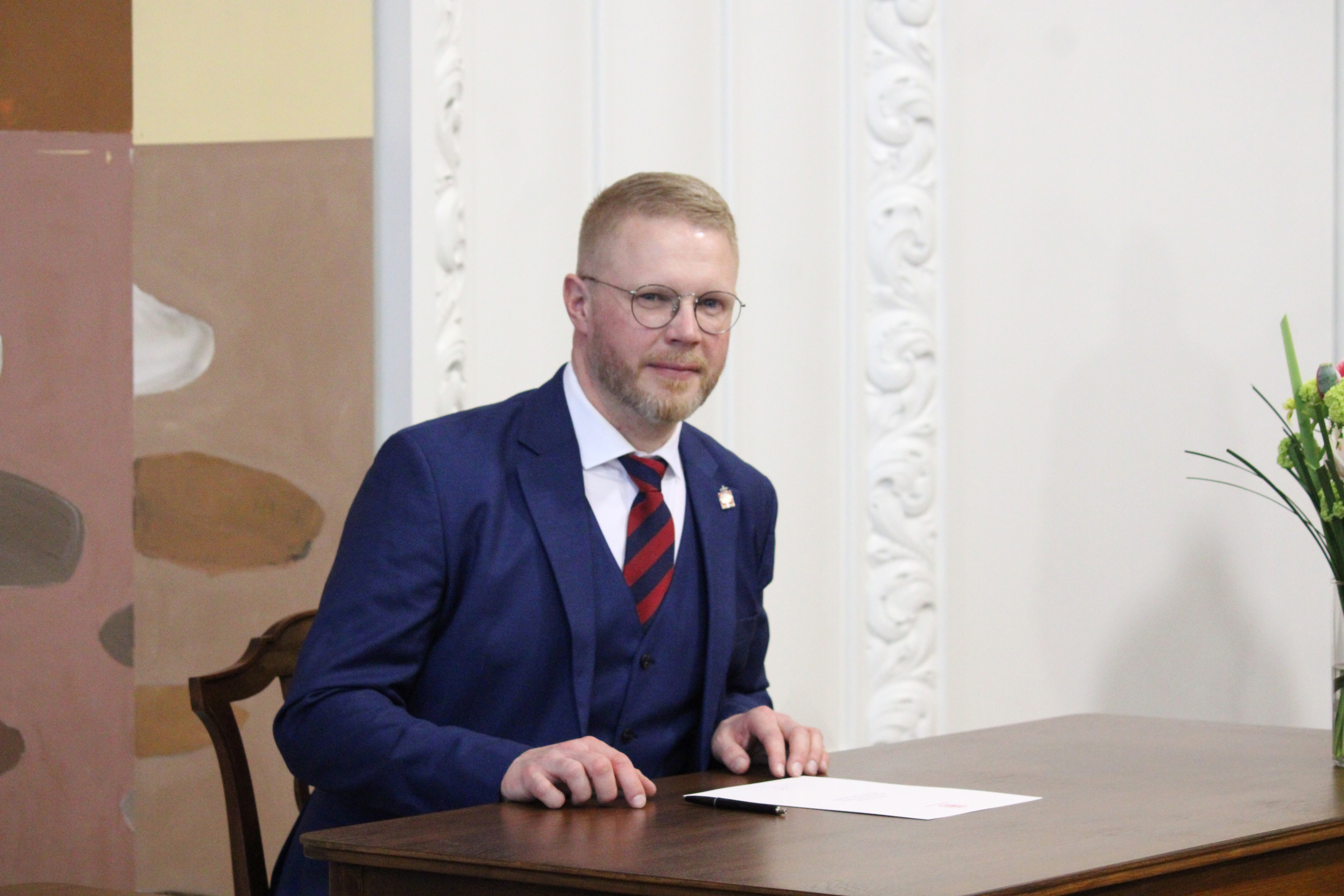
- Olesen in 2026

Member of the Danish Parliament
- Incumbent
- Assumed office 24 March 2026
- Constituency: West Jutland

Personal details
- Born: 21 June 1984 (age 42)
- Party: Danish People's Party

Søren Boel Olesen (born 21 June 1984) is a Danish politician from the Danish People's Party. He was elected to the Folketing in 2026.

He was a member of Holstebro Municipality council.

== See also ==
- List of members of the Folketing, 2026–present
