= Jørgen Kvist =

Danish politician (born 1965)

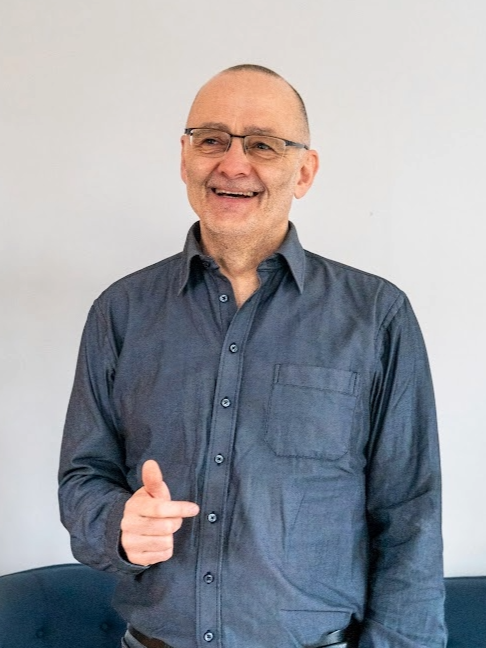
- Kvist in 2026

Member of the Danish Parliament
- Incumbent
- Assumed office 24 March 2026
- Constituency: South Jutland

Personal details
- Born: 8 March 1965 (age 61) Esbjerg
- Party: Green Left

Jørgen Kvist (born 8 March 1965) is a Danish politician and member of the Folketing for the Green Left (SF). He was elected to the Folketing in March 2026.

== Background ==
Jørgen Kvist is a Danish theologian and organizational leader. He holds a Cand.theol. degree and has worked as a folk high school principal, consultant, and pastor.

From 2013 to 2025 he served as Secretary General of YMCA and YWCA Denmark.

== Politics ==
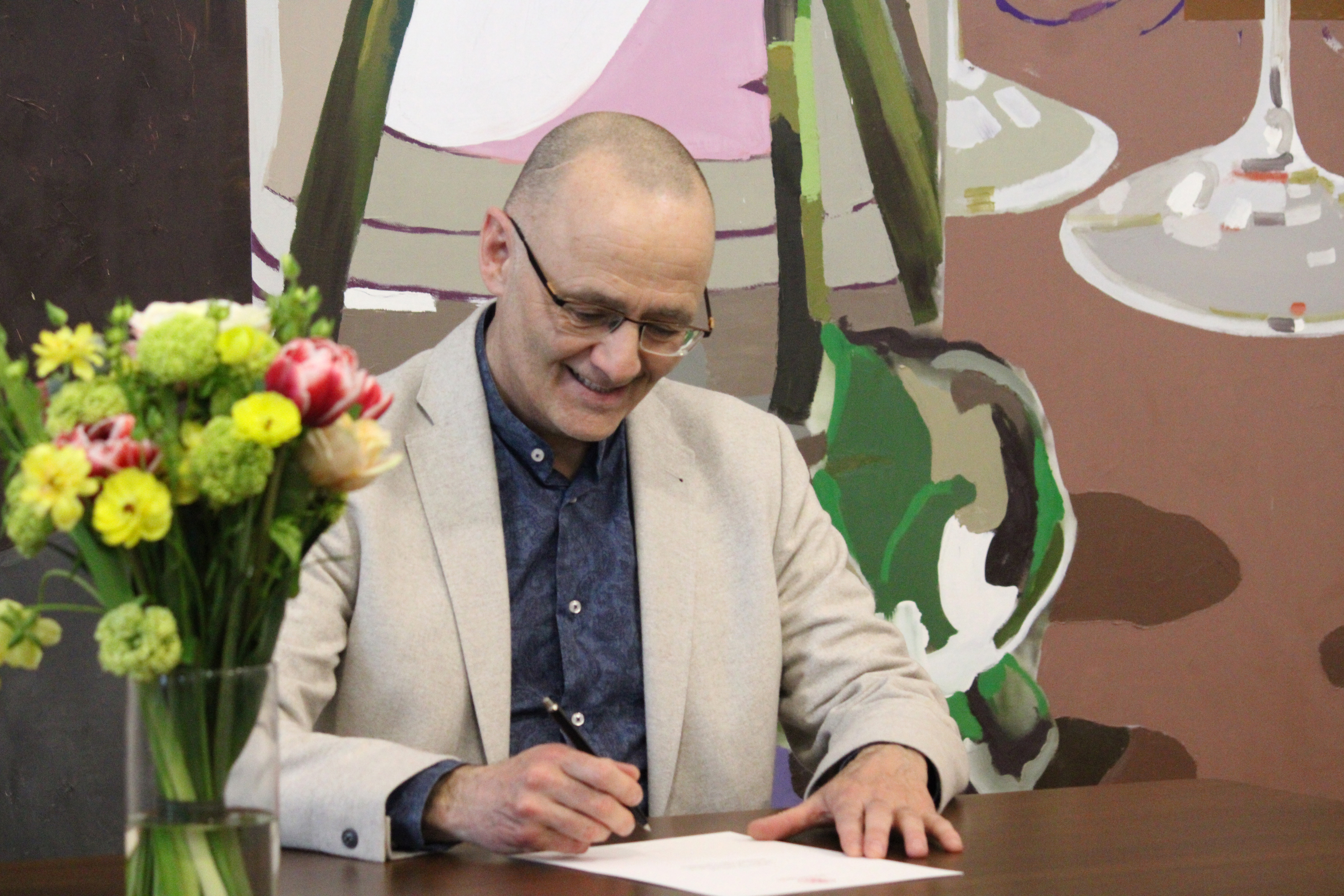
Kvist signing a pledge to uphold the Danish Constitution at Christiansborg, 14 April 2026

Jørgen Kvist is a member of Green Left (SF). He was elected to the Folketing in March 2026 in 'Sydjyllands Storkreds'.

== See also ==
- List of members of the Folketing, 2026–present
