= Thomas Klimek =

Danish politician

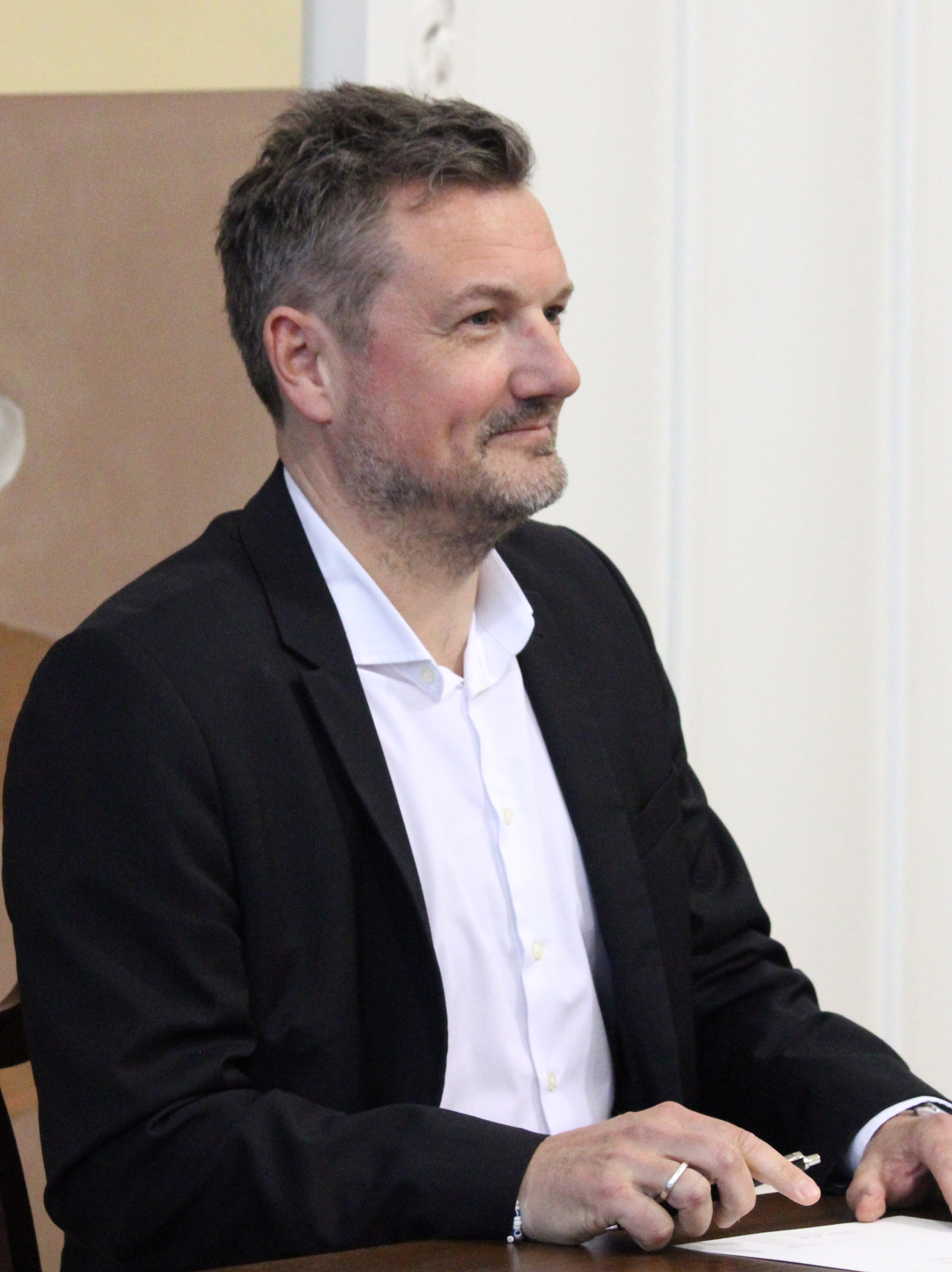
- Klimek in 2026

Member of the Danish Parliament
- Incumbent
- Assumed office 24 March 2026
- Constituency: North Jutland

Personal details
- Born: 14 February 1977 (age 49)
- Party: Social Democrats
- Website: klimek.dk

Thomas Klimek (born 14 February 1977) is a Danish politician from the Social Democrats. He was elected to the Folketing in 2026.

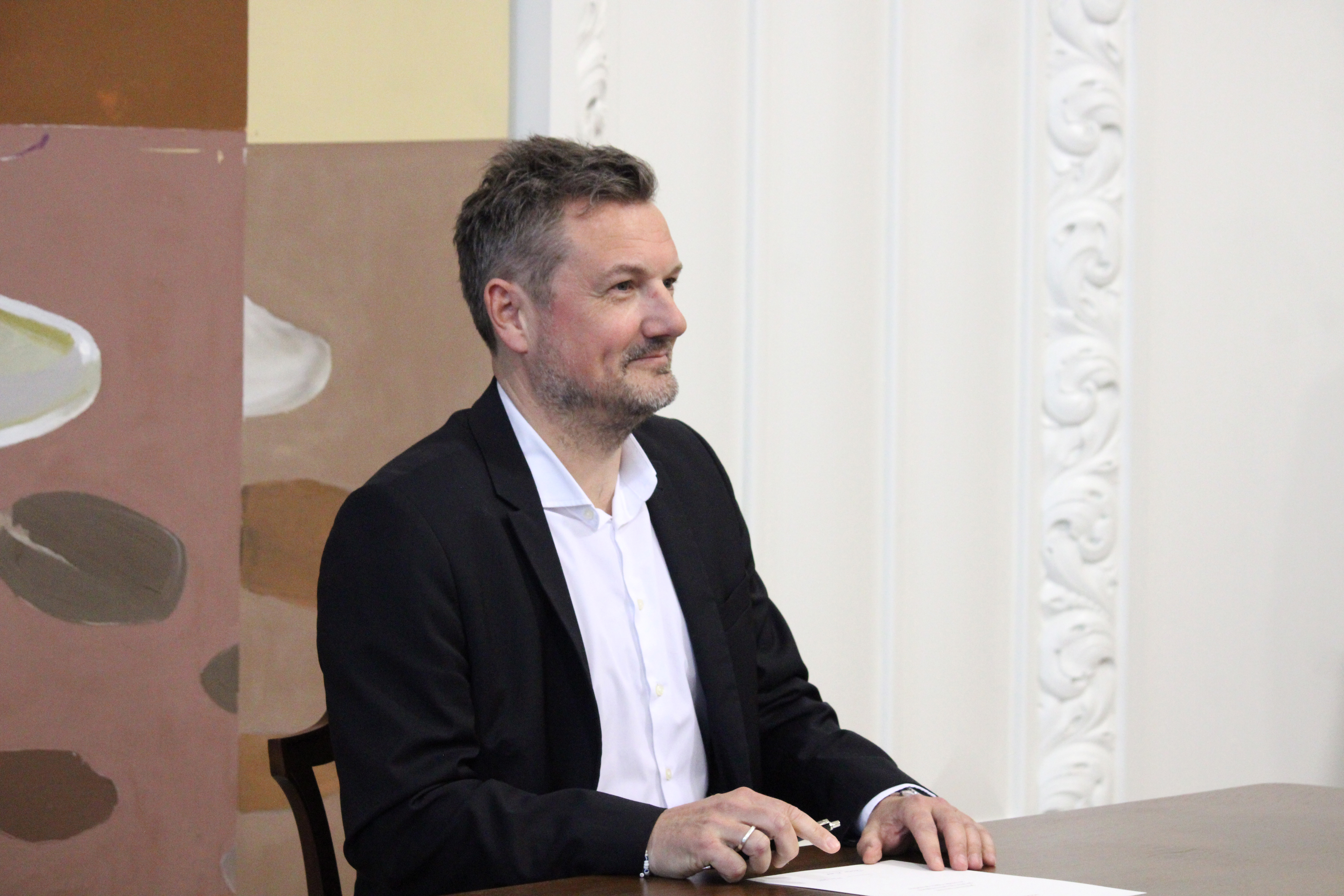
Klimek signing a pledge to uphold the Danish Constitution at Christiansborg, 14 April 2026

== See also ==
- List of members of the Folketing, 2026–present
