= Morten E. G. Brautsch =

Danish politician

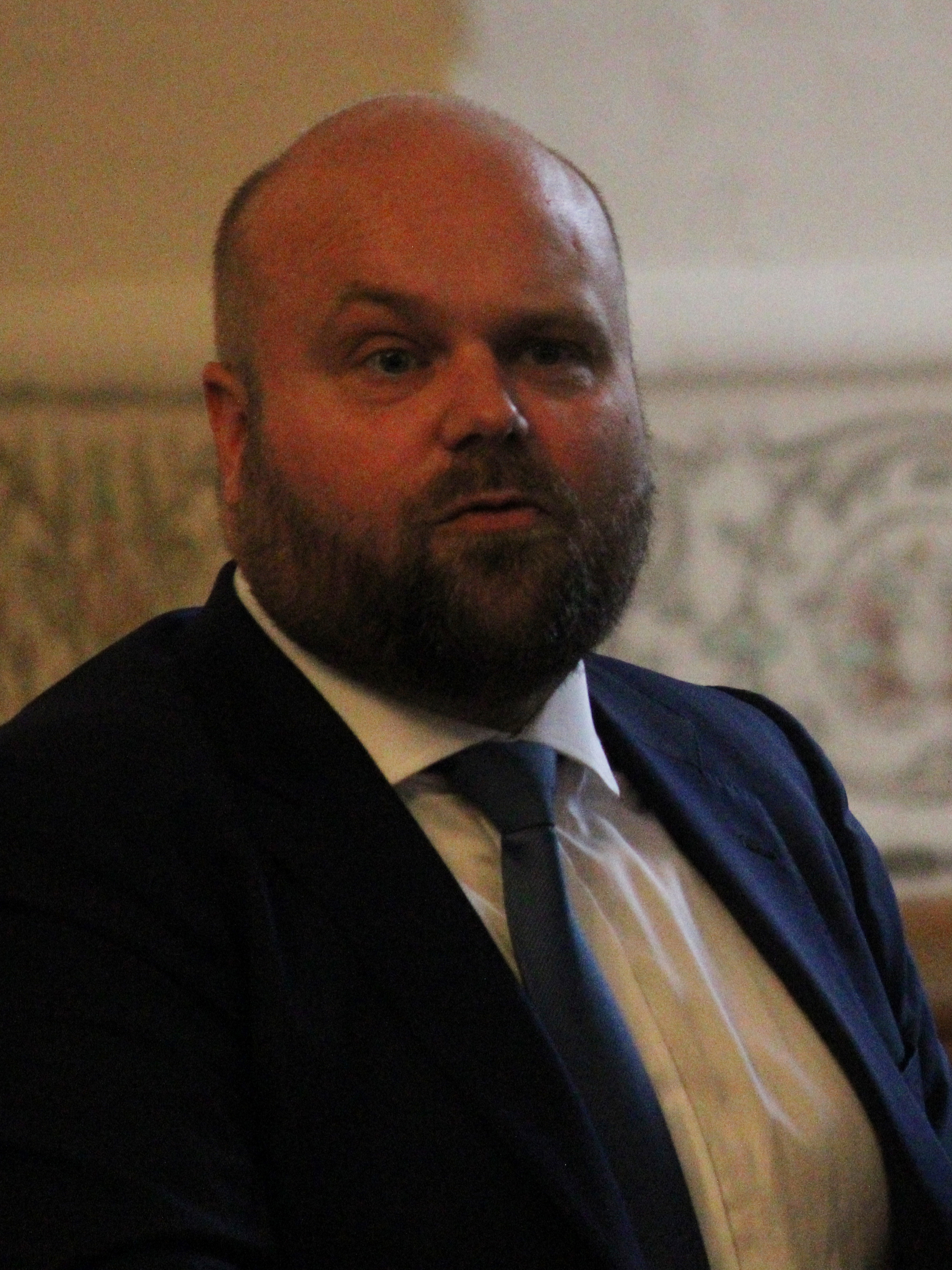
- Brautsch in 2026

Member of the Danish Parliament
- Incumbent
- Assumed office 24 March 2026
- Constituency: West Jutland

Personal details
- Born: 26 March 1985 (age 41)
- Party: Moderates

Morten E. G. Brautsch (born 26 March 1985) is a Danish politician from the Moderates. He was elected to the Folketing in 2026.

Brautsch replaced Mette Kierkgaard as a candidate. He was a special advisor to Foreign Minister Lars Løkke Rasmussen.

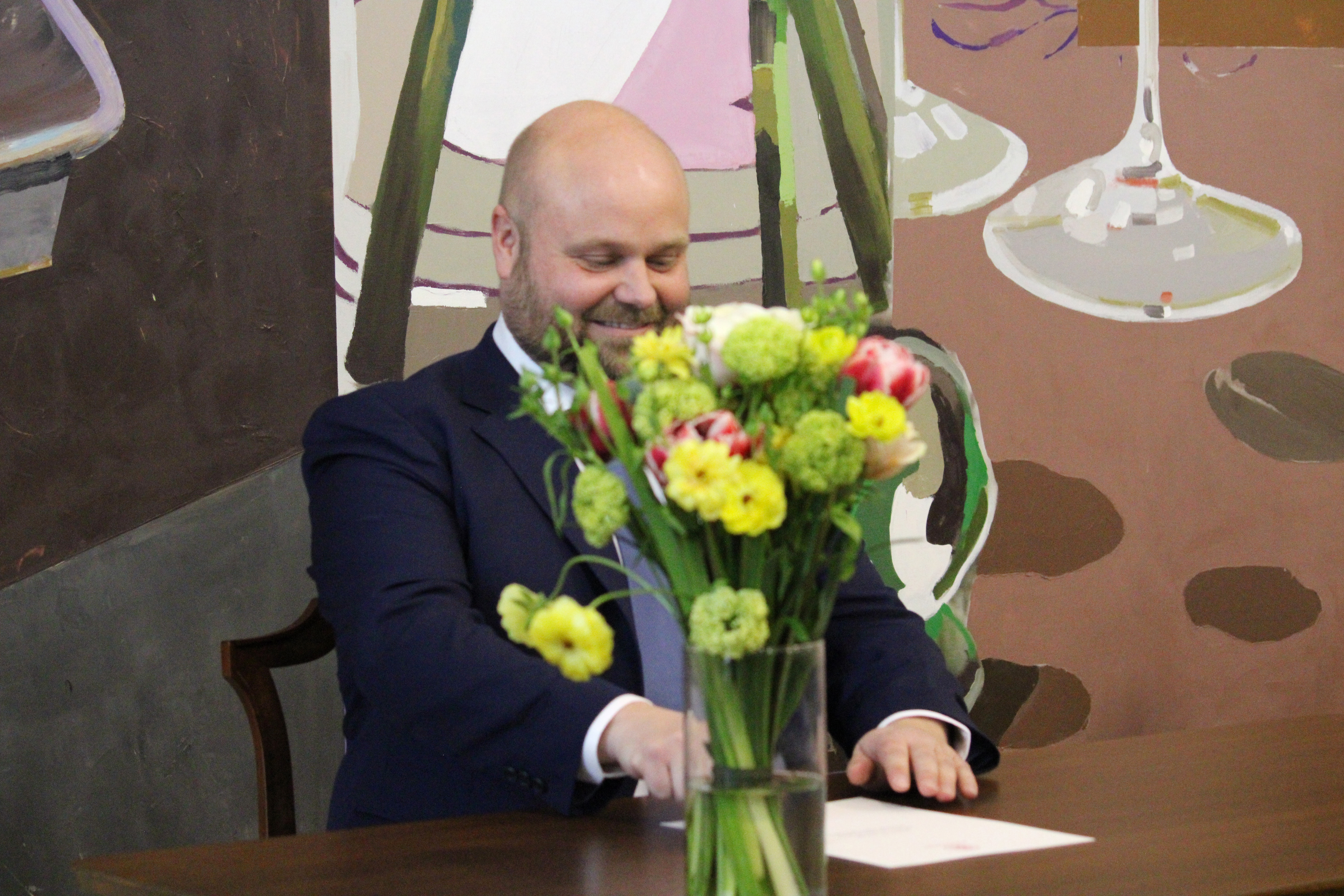
Brautsch signing a pledge to uphold the Danish Constitution at Christiansborg, 14 April 2026

== See also ==
- List of members of the Folketing, 2026–present
