= Pernille Christensen =

Danish politician

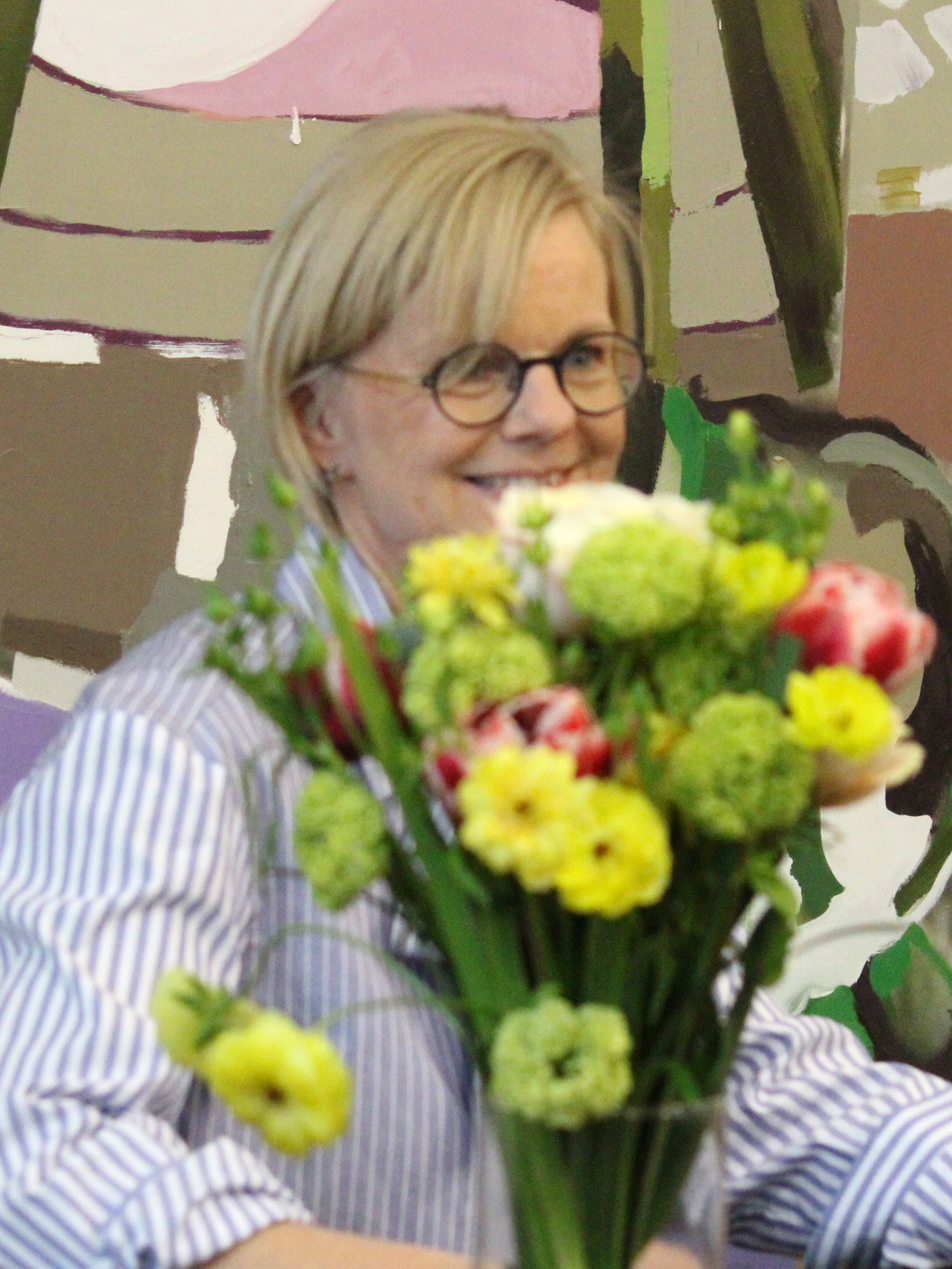
- Christensen in 2026

Member of the Folketing
- Incumbent
- Assumed office 24 March 2026
- Constituency: North Zealand

Personal details
- Born: 18 June 1974 (age 51)
- Party: Moderates

Pernille Christensen (born 18 June 1974) is a Danish politician from the Moderates. She was elected to the Folketing in 2026.

Christensen is a civil servant by profession.

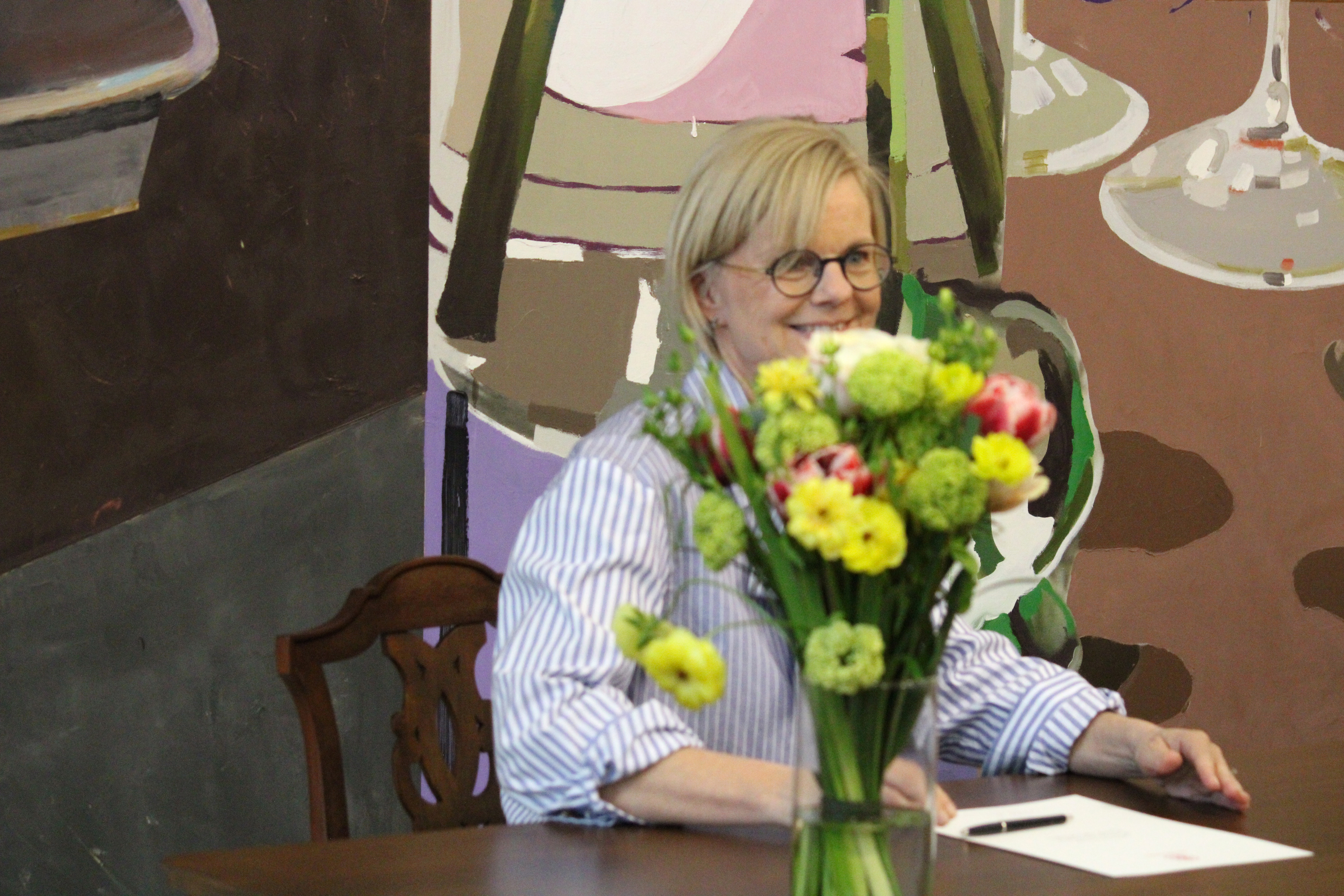
Christensen signing a pledge to uphold the Danish Constitution at Christiansborg, 14 April 2026

== See also ==
- List of members of the Folketing, 2026–present
