= Michael Nedersøe =

Danish politician

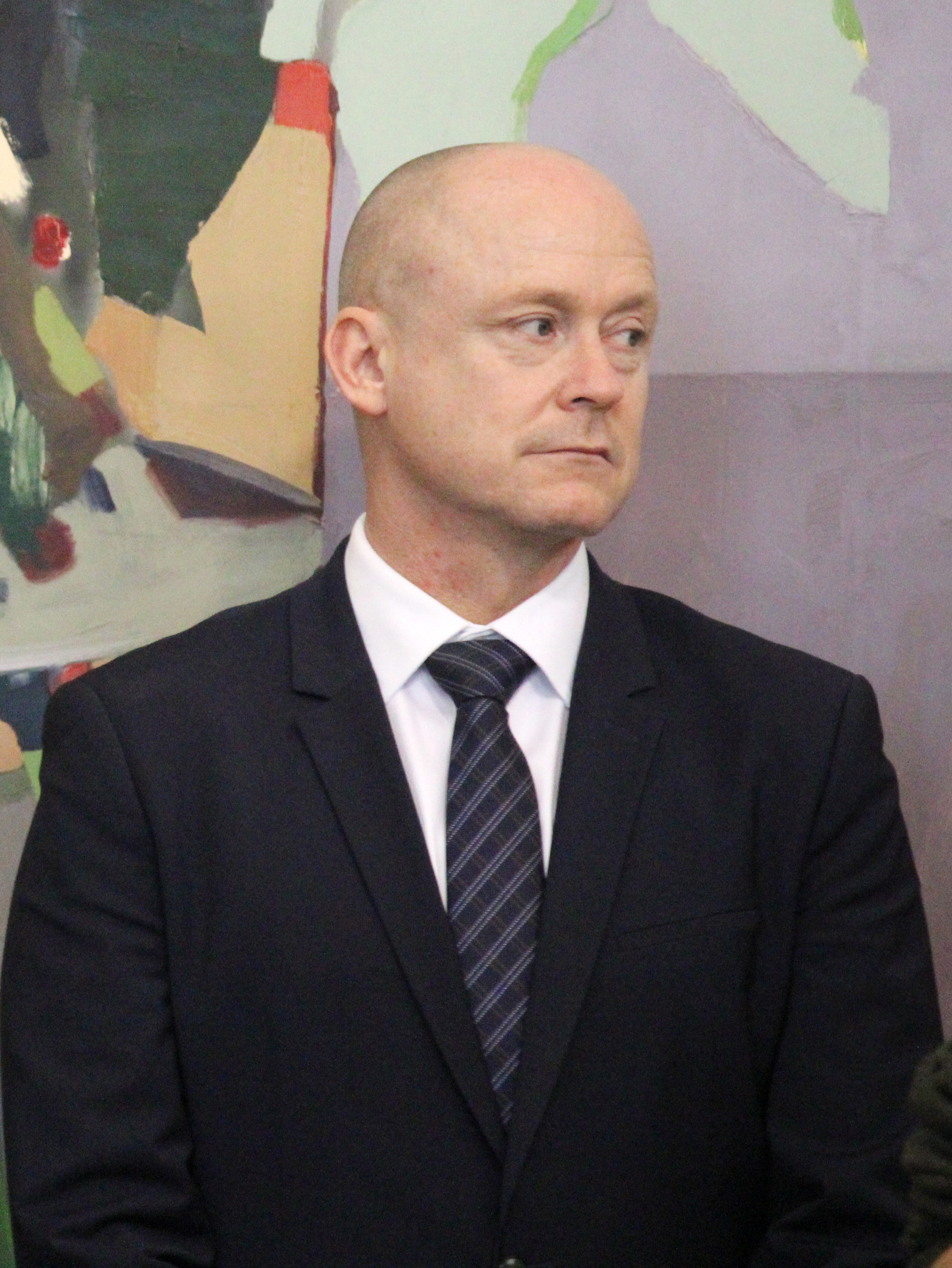
- Nedersøe in 2026

Member of the Danish Parliament
- Incumbent
- Assumed office 24 March 2026
- Constituency: East Jutland

Personal details
- Born: 22 October 1978 (age 47)
- Party: Danish People's Party

Michael Nedersøe (born 22 October 1978) is a Danish politician from the Danish People's Party. He was elected to the Folketing in the 2026 Danish general election.

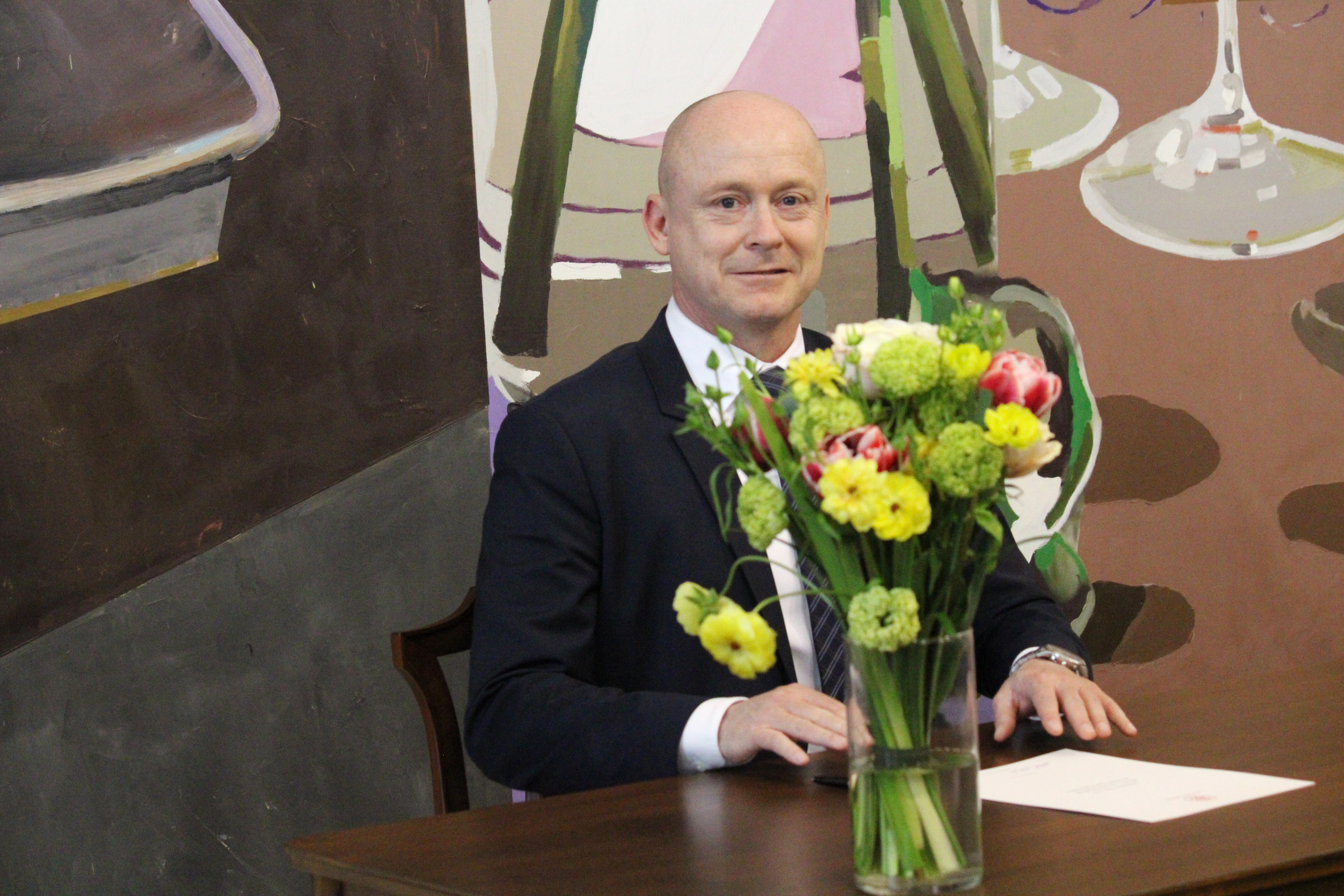
Nedersøe signing a pledge to uphold the Danish Constitution at Christiansborg, 14 April 2026

Nedersøe was a candidate in the 2024 European Parliament election.

== See also ==
- List of members of the Folketing, 2026–present
