= Jan Herskov =

Danish politician (born 1966)

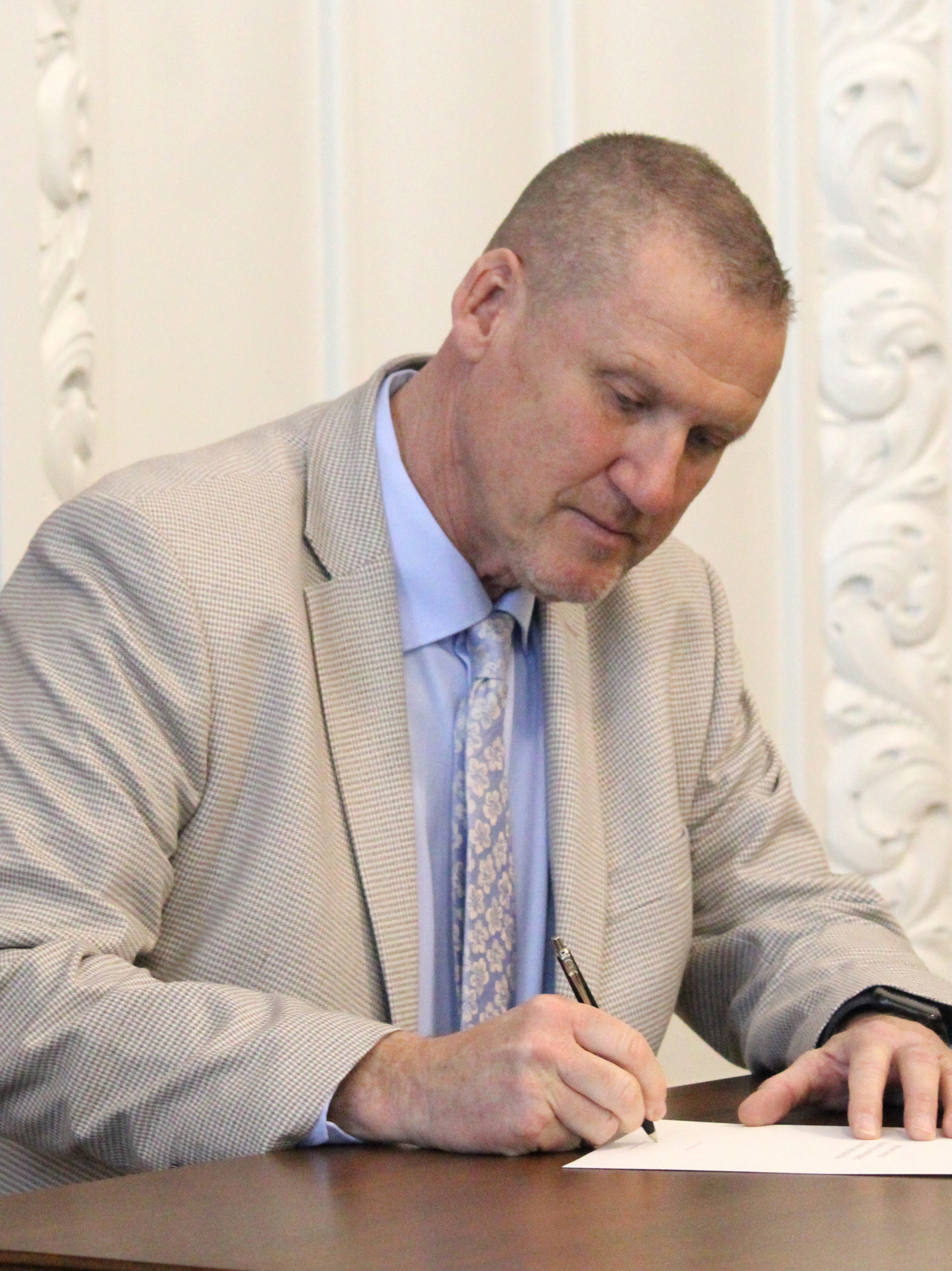
- Herskov in 2026

Member of the Danish Parliament
- Incumbent
- Assumed office 24 March 2026
- Constituency: Zealand

Personal details
- Born: 15 July 1966 (age 60)
- Party: Danish People's Party

Jan Herskov (born 15 July 1966) is a Danish politician from the Danish People's Party. He was elected to the Folketing in the 2026 Danish general election. He was elected with 460 personal votes.

== See also ==
- List of members of the Folketing, 2026–present
