= Joachim Riis =

Danish politician

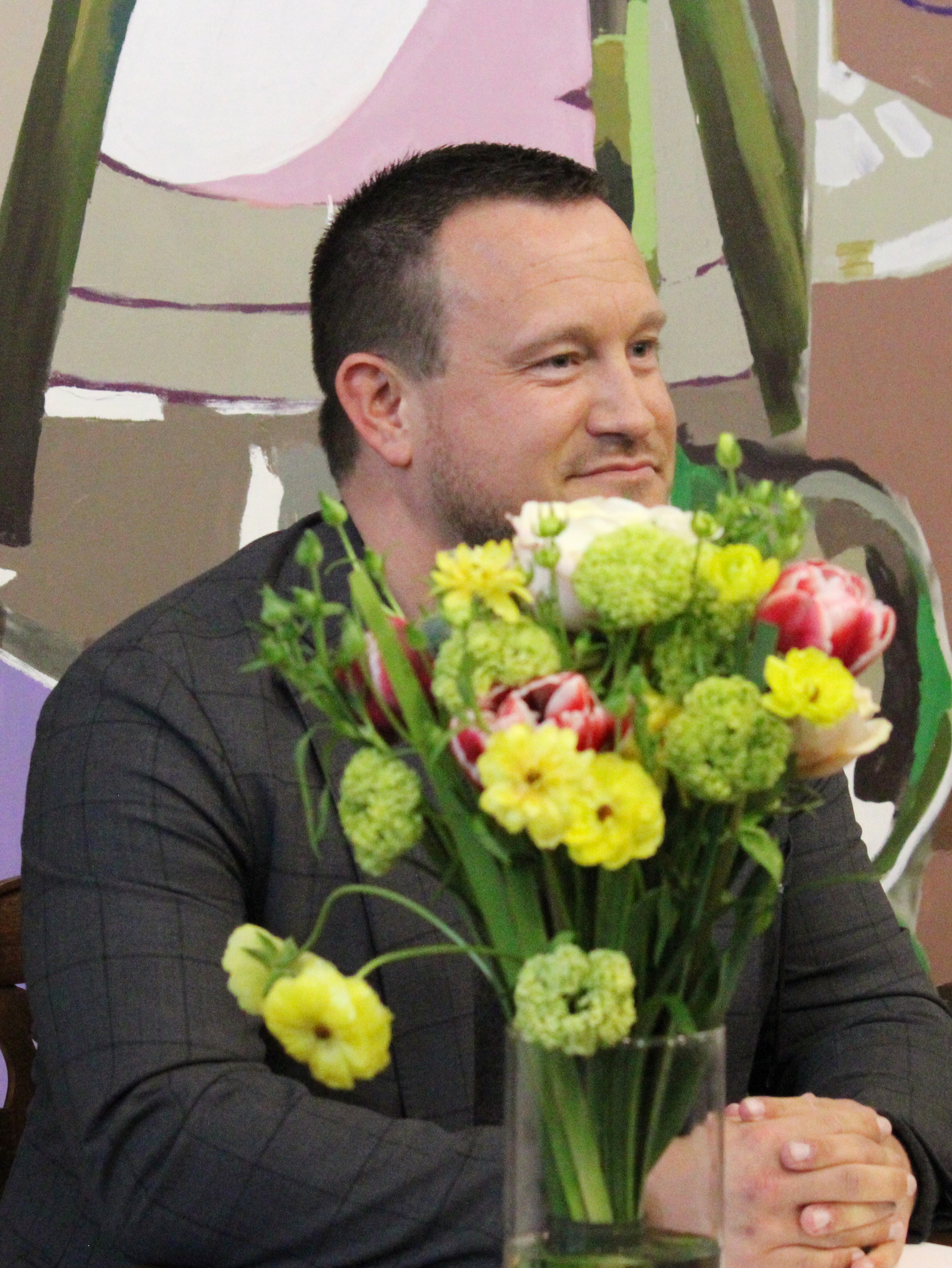
- Riis in 2026

Member of the Danish Parliament
- Incumbent
- Assumed office 24 March 2026
- Constituency: Zealand

Personal details
- Born: 3 February 1989 (age 37)
- Party: Liberal Alliance

Joachim Riis (born 3 February 1989) is a Danish politician from the Liberal Alliance. He was elected to the Folketing in 2026.

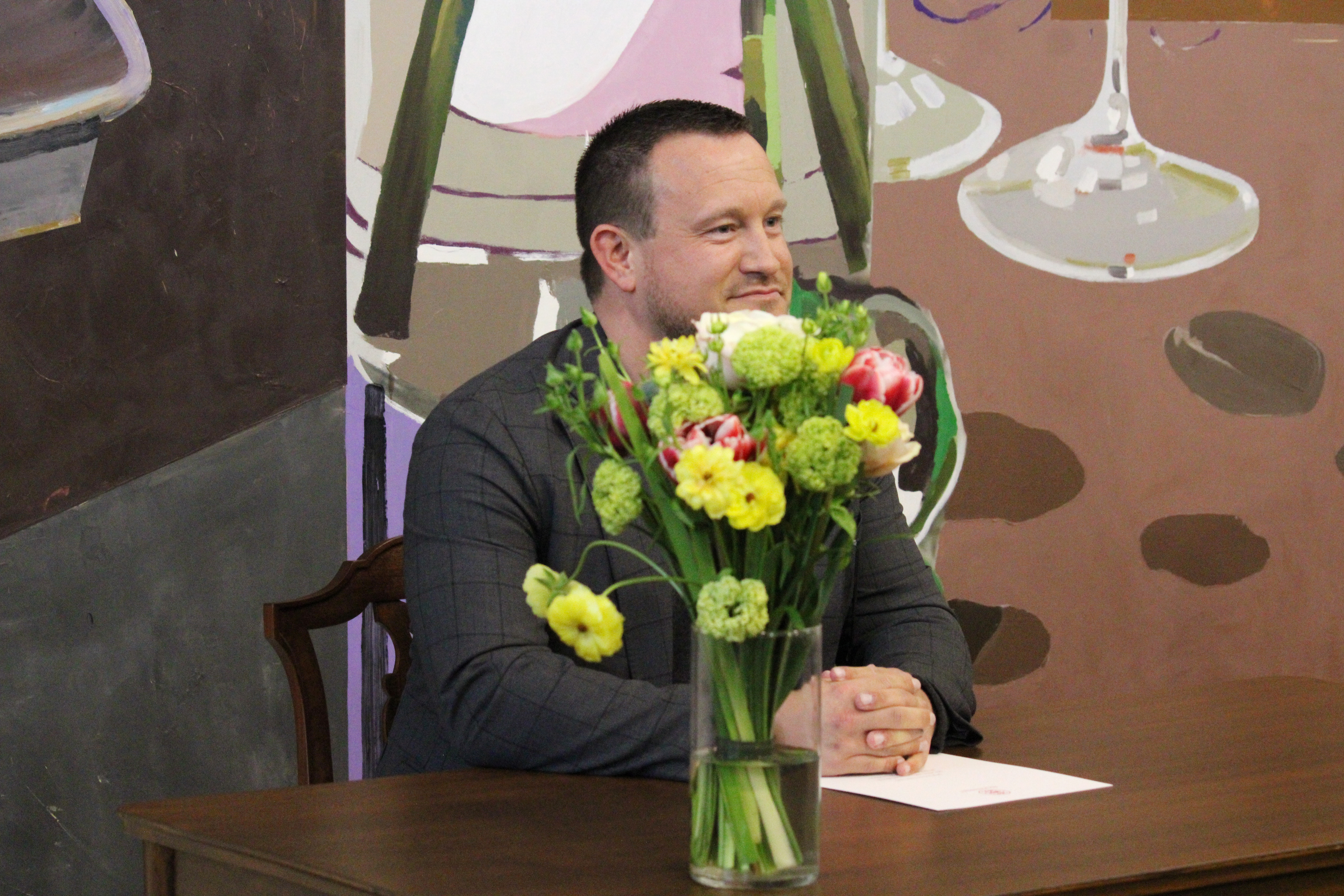
Riis signing a pledge to uphold the Danish Constitution at Christiansborg, 14 April 2026

== See also ==
- List of members of the Folketing, 2026–present
