= Majbritt Birkholm =

Danish politician (born 1981)

Member of the European Parliament
- Incumbent
- Assumed office 16 April 2026
- Preceded by: Anders Vistisen
- Constituency: Denmark

Personal details
- Born: 10 May 1981 (age 44)
- Party: Danish People's Party
- Other political affiliations: Patriots.eu

Majbritt Birkholm (born 10 May 1981) is a Danish politician serving as a member of the European Parliament since 2026. She has served as deputy leader of the Danish People's Party since 2023.
