= Steffen Holme Helledie =

Danish politician (born 1989)

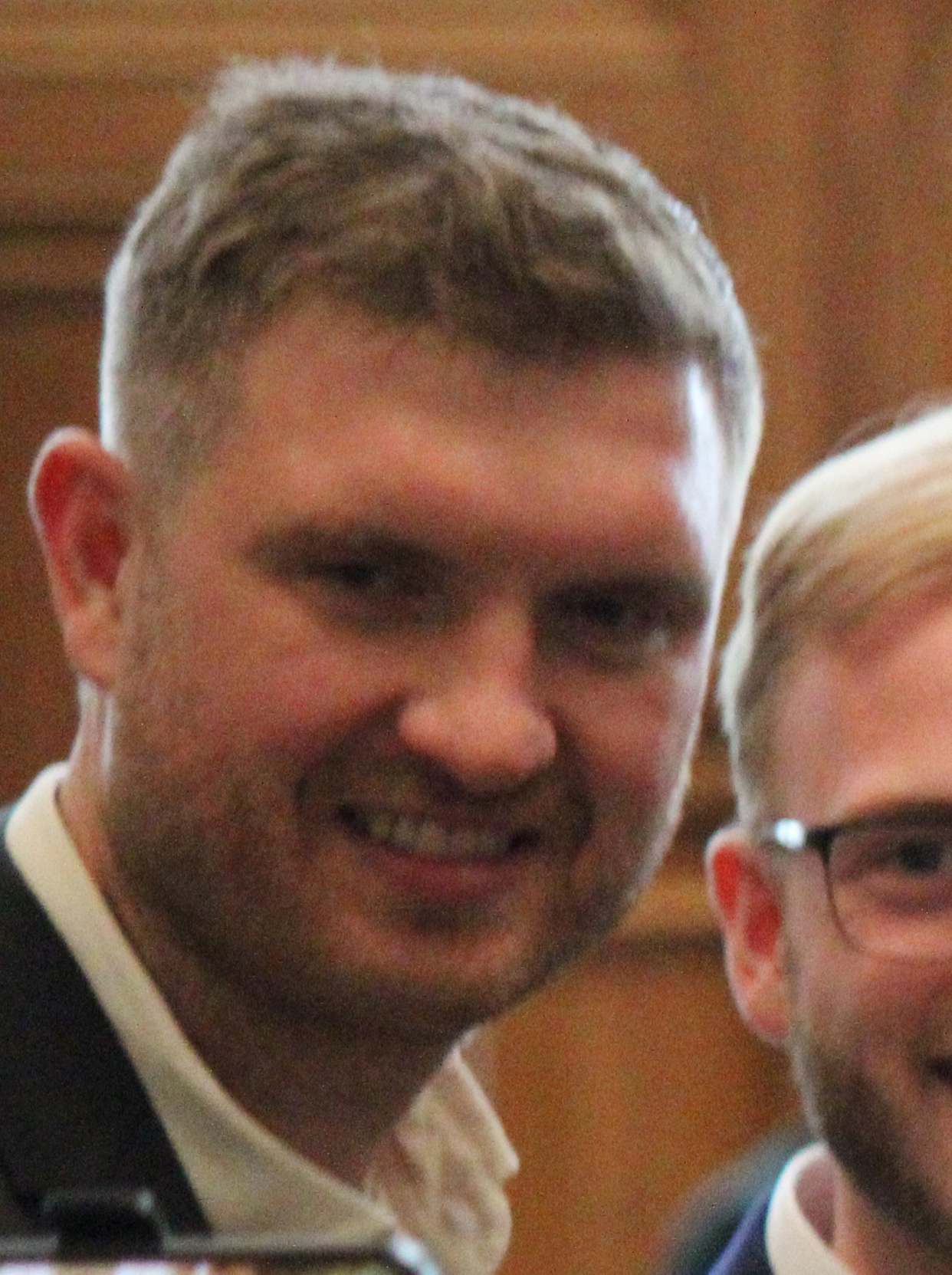
- Helledie in 2026

Member of the Danish Parliament
- Incumbent
- Assumed office 24 March 2026
- Constituency: North Jutland

Personal details
- Born: 12 October 1989 (age 36)
- Party: Danish Social Liberal Party

Steffen Holme Helledie (born 12 October 1989) is a Danish politician from the Danish Social Liberal Party. He was elected to the Folketing in 2026.

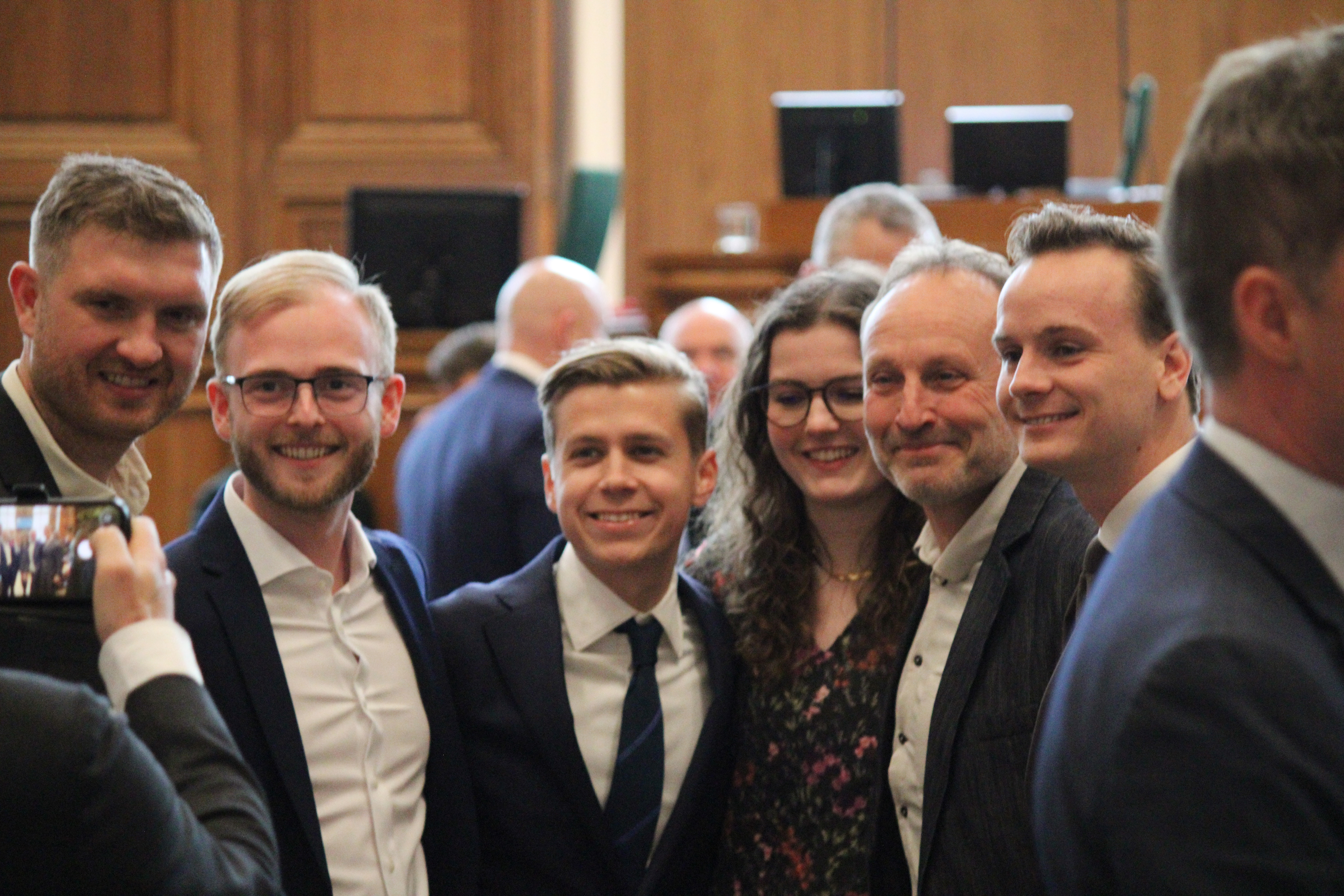
Helledie with other members of his party, 14 April 2026

== See also ==
- List of members of the Folketing, 2026–present
