= Ulrik Knudsen =

Danish politician

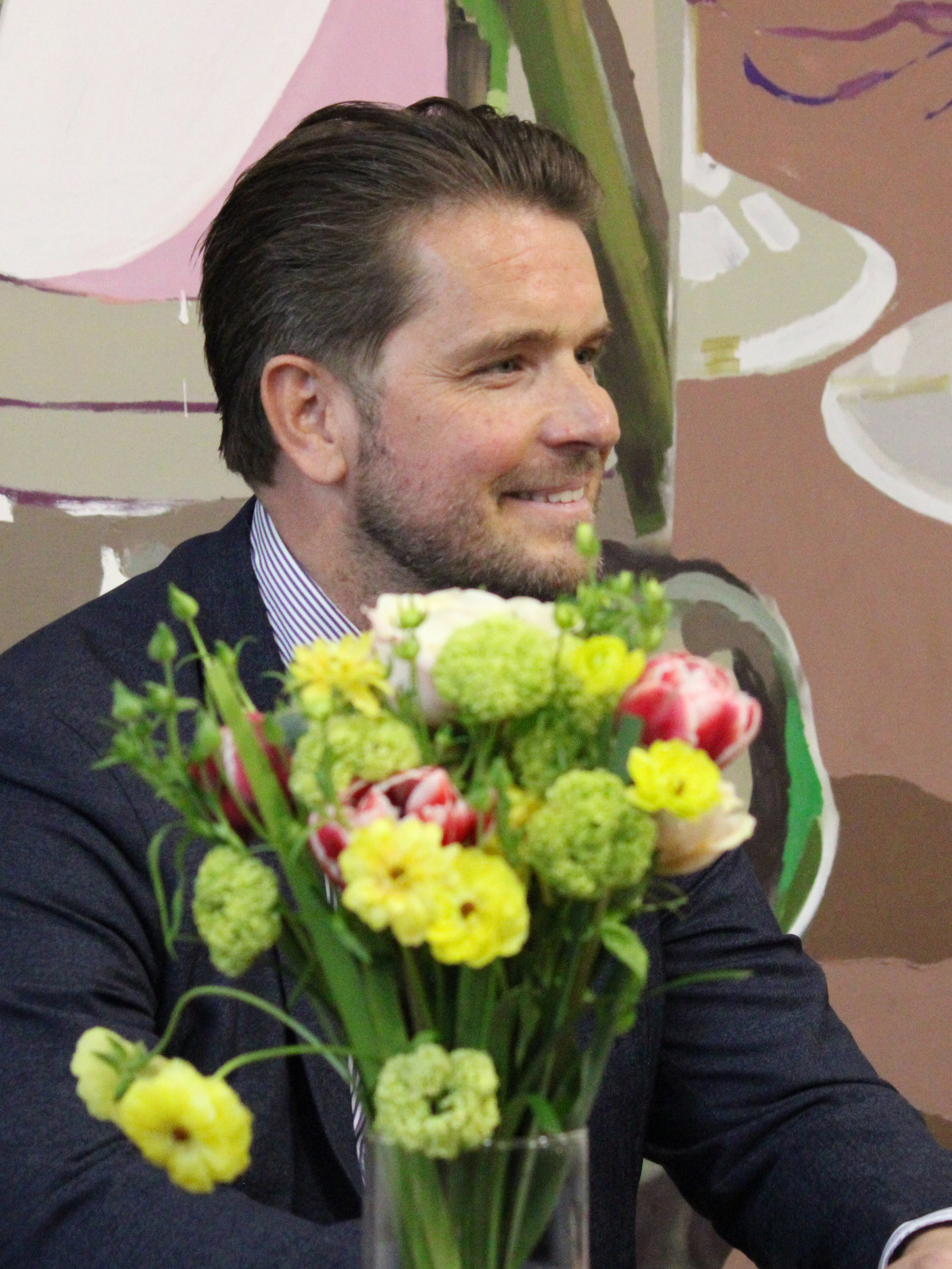
- Knudsen in 2026

Member of the Danish Parliament
- Incumbent
- Assumed office 24 March 2026
- Constituency: South Jutland

Personal details
- Born: 12 October 1978 (age 47)
- Party: Denmark Democrats

Ulrik Knudsen (born 12 October 1978) is a Danish politician from the Denmark Democrats. He was elected to the Folketing in 2026.

== See also ==
- List of members of the Folketing, 2026–present
