= Christina Lykke =

Danish politician

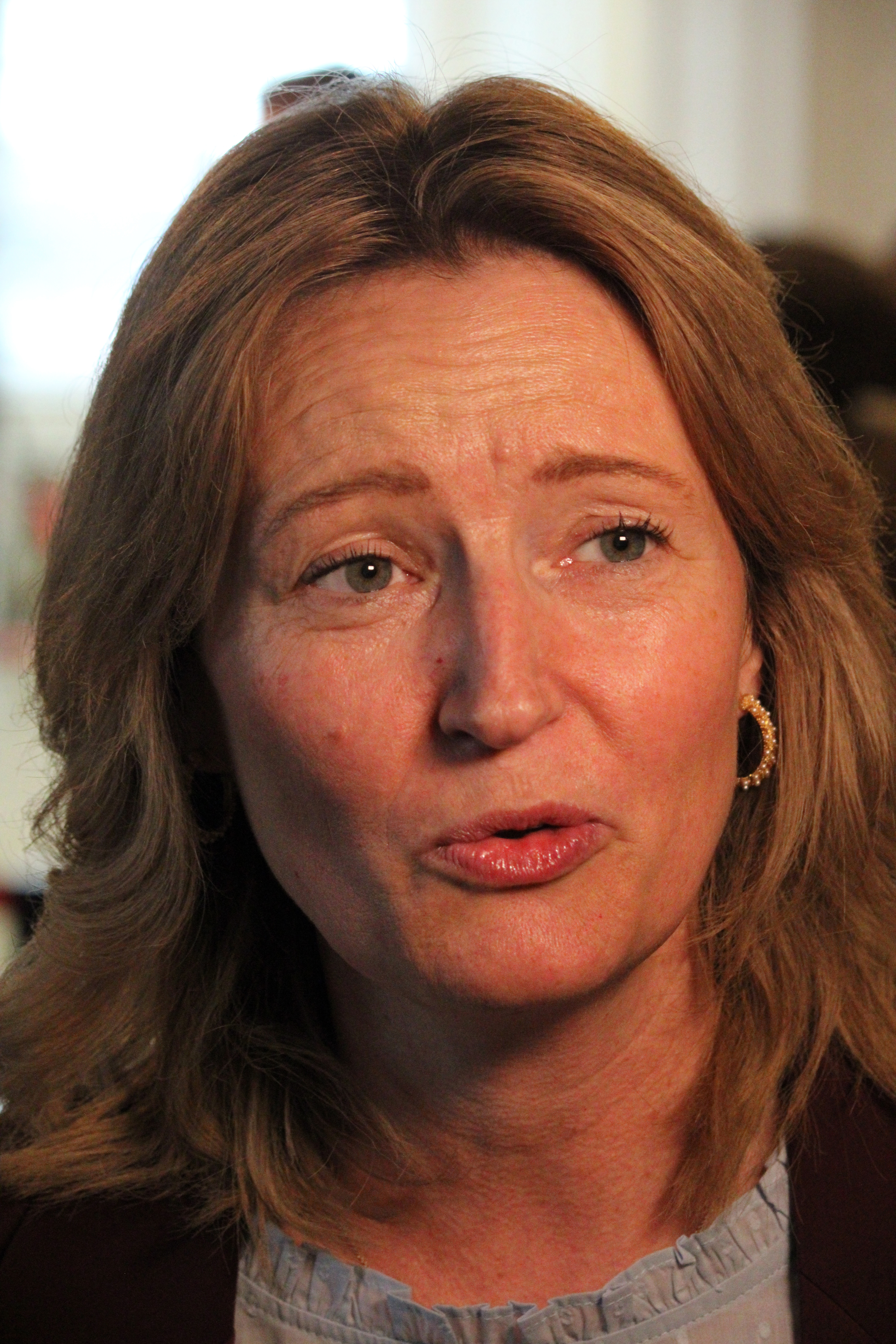
- Lykke in 2026

Member of the Danish Parliament
- Incumbent
- Assumed office 24 March 2026
- Constituency: North Jutland

Personal details
- Born: 15 April 1981 (age 45)
- Party: Green Left

Christina Lykke Risager Eriksen (born 15 April 1981) is a Danish politician from the Green Left. She was elected to the Folketing in 2026. She was previously a member of the city council in Frederikshavn.

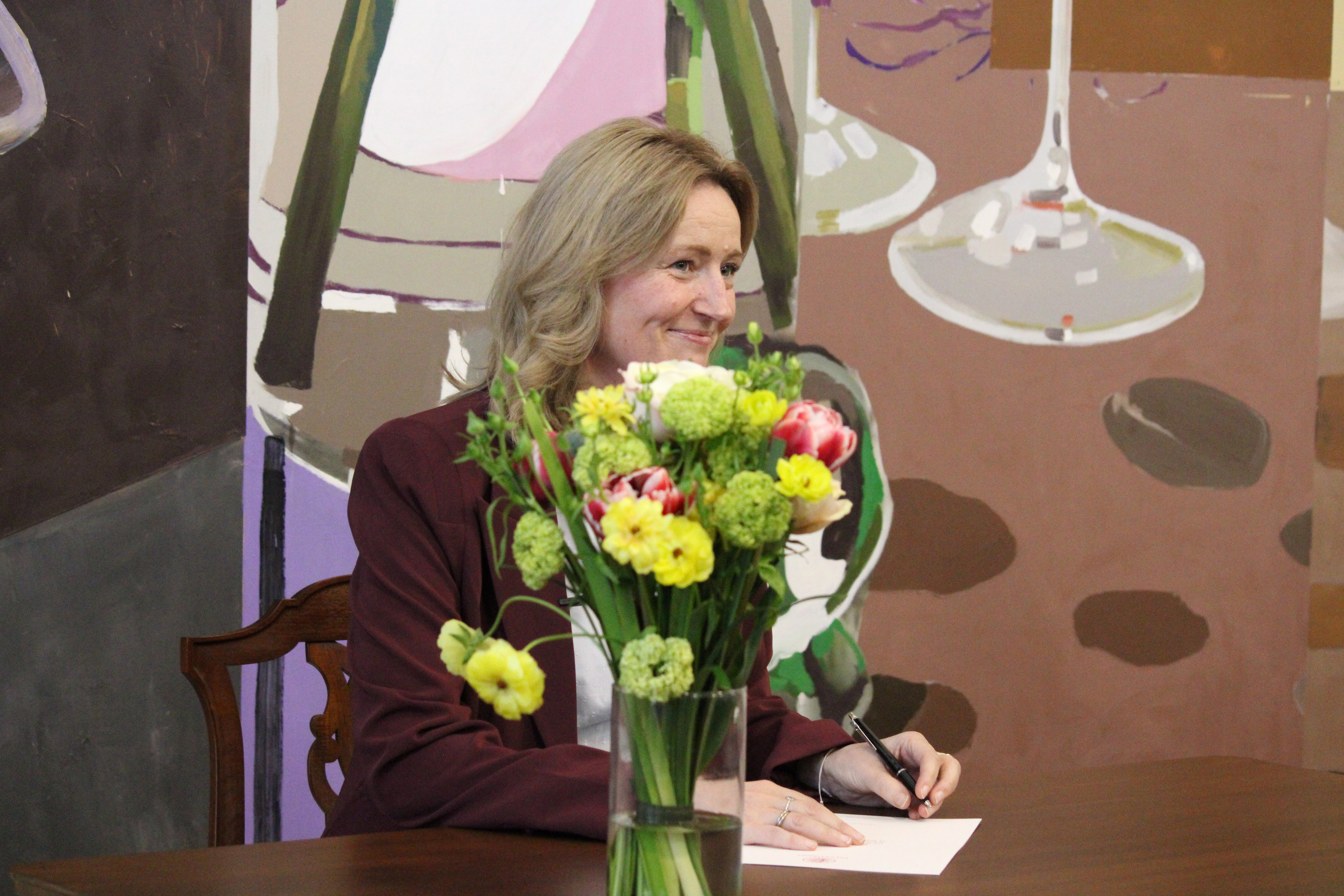
Lykke signing a pledge to uphold the Danish Constitution at Christiansborg, 14 April 2026

== See also ==
- List of members of the Folketing, 2026–present
