= Allan Feldt =

Danish politician, entrepreneur and investor

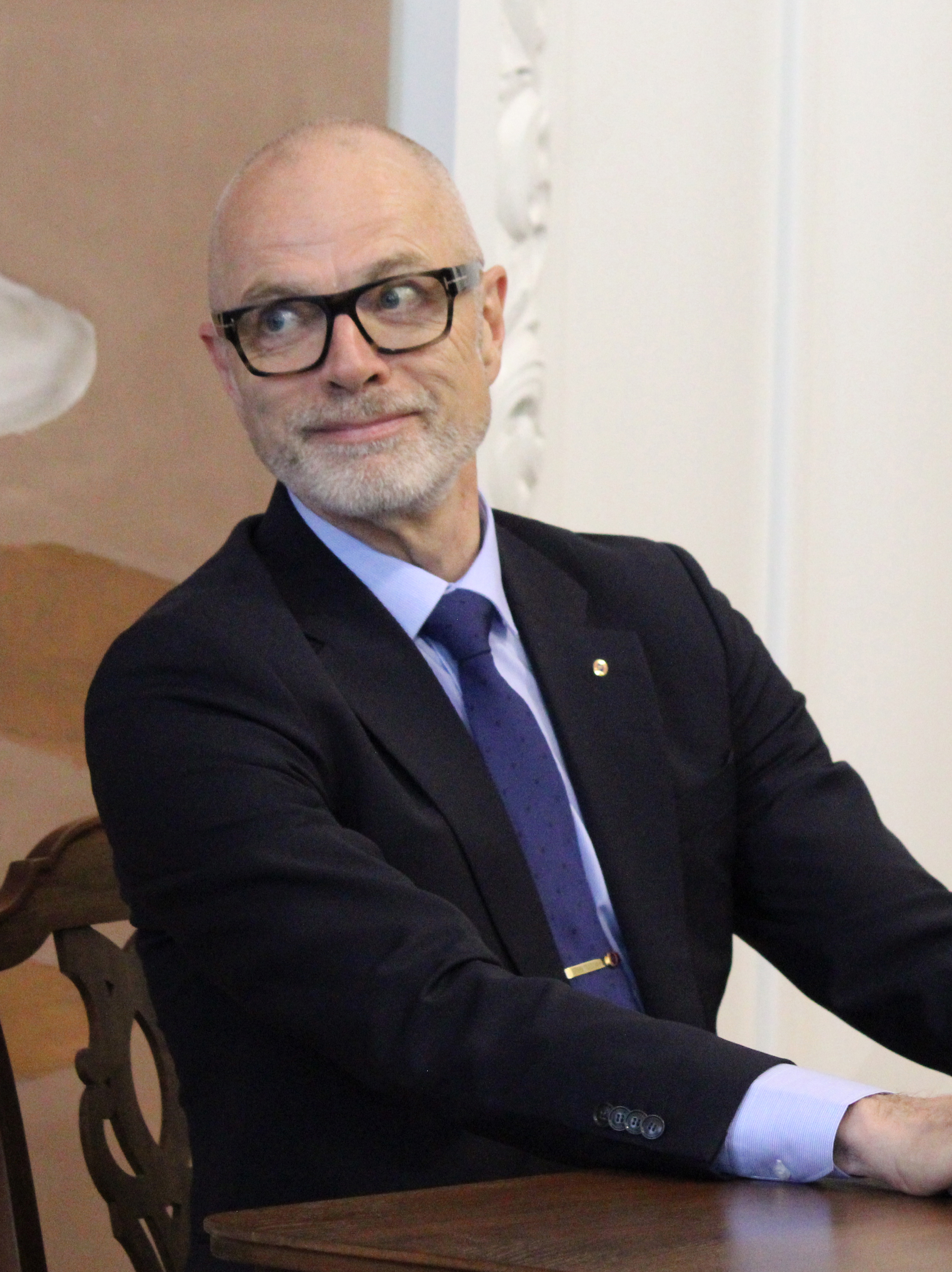
- Feldt in 2026

Member of the Danish Parliament
- Incumbent
- Assumed office 24 March 2026
- Constituency: Copenhagen

Personal details
- Born: 3 June 1963 (age 63)
- Party: Danish People's Party
- Other political affiliations: Citizens' Party (former)

Allan Søby Feldt (born 3 June 1963) is a Danish politician from the Danish People's Party. He was elected to the Folketing in the 2026 Danish general election.

He is a businessman and entrepreneur. He was previously in the Citizens' Party. He was elected by two votes more than Paw Karslund.

Previously, Allan Feldt founded Aqua D’or, the multi-million dollar company fixated around selling “luxury” water at an affordable price.

Allan Feldt introduced Aqua D’or to the Danish population in the 1980’s, but has later sold the company for a large sum.

He now resides in Denmark, and worked on his second project called SEiMEi. It went bankrupt.

== See also ==
- List of members of the Folketing, 2026–present
