= Peter Brixtofte =

Danish politician (1949–2016)

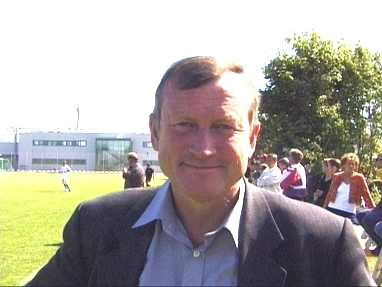
- Brixtofte in 2000

Tax Minister of Denmark
- In office 19 November 1992 – 24 January 1993
- Monarch: Margrethe II
- Prime Minister: Poul Schlüter
- Preceded by: Anders Fogh Rasmussen
- Succeeded by: Ole Stavad

Mayor of Farum
- In office 1985–2002
- Preceded by: Gøsta Gustavsen
- Succeeded by: Lars Carpens

Personal details
- Born: 11 December 1949 Copenhagen, Denmark
- Died: 2016 (aged 66); Farum, Denmark; Found dead 8 November 2016
- Spouses: Karen Magne Lauritsen; Gertie Jacobsen
- Children: 3, including Marie
- Occupation: Politician

Peter Brixtofte (11 December 1949 – 2016) was a Danish politician who was member of the Danish Parliament (Folketinget) representing Venstre from 1973 to 1977, from 1979 to 1981, during 1983 and from 1990 to 8 February 2005. Brixtofte served as the Tax Minister of Denmark from 19 November 1992 to 24 January 1993. He was also Mayor of Farum, and was criminally convicted for actions taken while holding that municipal office and was later jailed. He was the brother of Brixx member Jens Brixtofte.

== Mayor of Farum ==
For several years Brixtofte was the Mayor of Farum with his party having had an absolute majority. He was quite popular and Farum was generally considered a successful municipality thanks to its success in finding jobs for the unemployed, particularly immigrants. It was held up as having been a good example by Liberal politicians during national elections.

=== Controversial financial and welfare programs ===
Brixtofte made headlines with a highly untraditional sale-and-lease-back model where the municipality sold buildings and facilities to private companies and rented them back. Due to various national tax issues this was highly advantageous for both parties. This scheme allowed the municipality to have one of the lowest tax rates in Denmark at the same time as spending a huge amount of money on various welfare programs. Every child in school was given a high-end computer and the elderly were offered a free annual trip to a foreign holiday destination. A lot of prestigious building projects were initiated such as a sports arena and marina completely out of proportion to what one would expect from a city of this size. Due to the tax issues of the sale-and-lease-back model the expenses for these programs were largely covered by all taxpayers of Denmark, most of whom got no benefit from the programs. For a long time, the legal status of the scheme was unclear.

=== Scandals ===
In February 2002 several scandals surrounding his administration were revealed in the media. The first headlines involved exceptionally high spending in his administration. It was claimed that he routinely drank luxury red wine (at a cost of around $1,200 USD per bottle) on the public expense account. Furthermore, the wine was bought at a local restaurant in which Brixtofte was a shareholder. Municipal employees reported that the charismatic mayor had over years shown increasing signs of alcoholism and established an autocratic, intimidating climate at the town hall. Council members said he had attempted to prevent them from investigating his spending.

Multiple other incidents surfaced including the so-called "sponsor case" alleging that Brixtofte had made deals involving his municipality paying deliberate overprices for the welfare services bought from private companies who in return would sponsor the local football team (in which Brixtofte had a personal interest). Perhaps the most serious allegation accused Brixtofte of having ordered a secretary to purposely delay the payment of an invoice by one day so that Svend Petersen - a friend of Brixtofte - earned 325,000 DKR (57,000 USD) in compensation for the late payment. Svend Petersen has previously been found guilty in fraud in an unrelated case. During the initial investigations, several documents important to the case(s) mysteriously disappeared from the town hall.

=== Consequences ===
Eventually the investigations resulted in two criminal cases being raised against Brixtofte who pleaded not guilty in both. On 20 June 2006 Brixtofte was found guilty in the sponsor case (generally considered the smaller of the two) and was sentenced to jail for 2 years. He appealed but this was rejected on 8 February 2007. His lawyer then announced an appeal to the Supreme Court which would, however, only be granted in exceptional circumstances and can only affect the length of the sentence, not the guilty verdict. The appeal was granted by Procesbevillingsnævnet on 16 August 2007.

In the other legal case he was also found guilty on 10 April 2007. He was sentenced an additional 2 years of unconditional prison but appealed right away. The prosecutor also appealed for a higher sentence. Brixtofte's right-hand man, Leif Frimand Jensen, was also sentenced two years in prison, but it was made conditional due to his bad health. He also appealed. Twelve former and current councilmen were also charged, but risked only fines.

The welfare and leaseback programs got an abrupt ending as well. Eventually rulings were made on the tax issues making the sale-and-lease-back model less favorable. This as well as the bad media coverage of Brixtofte meant that investors lost faith in the administration. This caused the collapse of various plans that should have kept the scheme going, such as the sale of certain building sites. On top of that came increasing rent costs from the previous sales and eventually the municipality was forced to abandon the extraordinary welfare programs and dramatically raise its taxes. It went from being one of the cheapest to one of the most expensive municipalities in Denmark.

== Later political and professional life ==
After being exposed in early 2002, Brixtofte was excluded from Venstre (Liberal Party) and replaced as a mayor by his co-partisan Lars Carpens. He did, however, retain his seat on the council. In the local elections of 2005, now for the newly merged Furesø municipality, Brixtofte ran his own list, Velfærdspartiet ('Welfare Party') and was re-elected with 4.8% of the votes.

As a member of Parliament, Brixtofte was excluded from Venstre's party fraction in May 2002. In 2004 he briefly joined Centrum-Demokraterne, a minor party that had not been represented in Parliament since 2001, but left when he was not allowed to run as a parliamentary candidate until the criminal case was resolved. He kept his parliamentary seat until the elections of 8 February 2005.

In 2003 Brixtofte and Låsby-Svendsen, a well-known Danish estates, carpet and horse dealer, established the estate agency Brixtofte Emlak Turkey which specialised in selling holiday flats to Danes in Antalya. Reportedly the Turkish city has named roads and squares after Brixtofte.

On 9 February 2007, the day after being sentenced to prison, Brixtofte was denied entry to the United States upon arriving at a New York City airport. He claimed he had long planned a brief holiday getaway with his girlfriend after the end of the case, and that he was denied entry due to not possessing a visa. A visa is, however, not generally required for holiday visits to the U.S. by Danish citizens who can enter through the Visa Waiver Program.

On 12 April 2007, the Copenhagen Post reported that a Hillerød court sentenced Brixtofte to two years in jail. He was found guilty of taking out a DKK 450-million loan without asking the city council for permission. He also used public funds for banquets with wine costing DKK 6000 per bottle. In June 2006, he had already been sentenced to two years in prison for a corruption scandal involving his sponsorship of Farum's handball club.

On 15 April 2008, the Danish supreme court confirmed the verdict of two years' imprisonment for the sponsorship case. Brixtofte was eligible to appeal the decisionto the European Court of Human Rights.

On 28 May 2008, the Interior Ministry's Board of Eligibility stripped Brixtofte of his right to be an elected political representative due to the supreme court's verdict in the sponsorship case.

On Wednesday 6 August 2008 Peter Brixtofte began serving his two-year sentence in Horserød Statsfængsel open prison in the northeast of Zealand. He was released from his second period of incarceration on 16 May 2011.

Brixtofte was found dead in his apartment on 8 November 2016; he was 66. According to his daughter Marie, he "had been dead for many days" when he was found.

Political offices
Preceded by Anders Fogh Rasmussen	Tax Minister of Denmark; 1992-11-19 – 1993-01-24	Succeeded by Ole Stavad
