= Peter Larsen (politician) =

Danish politician

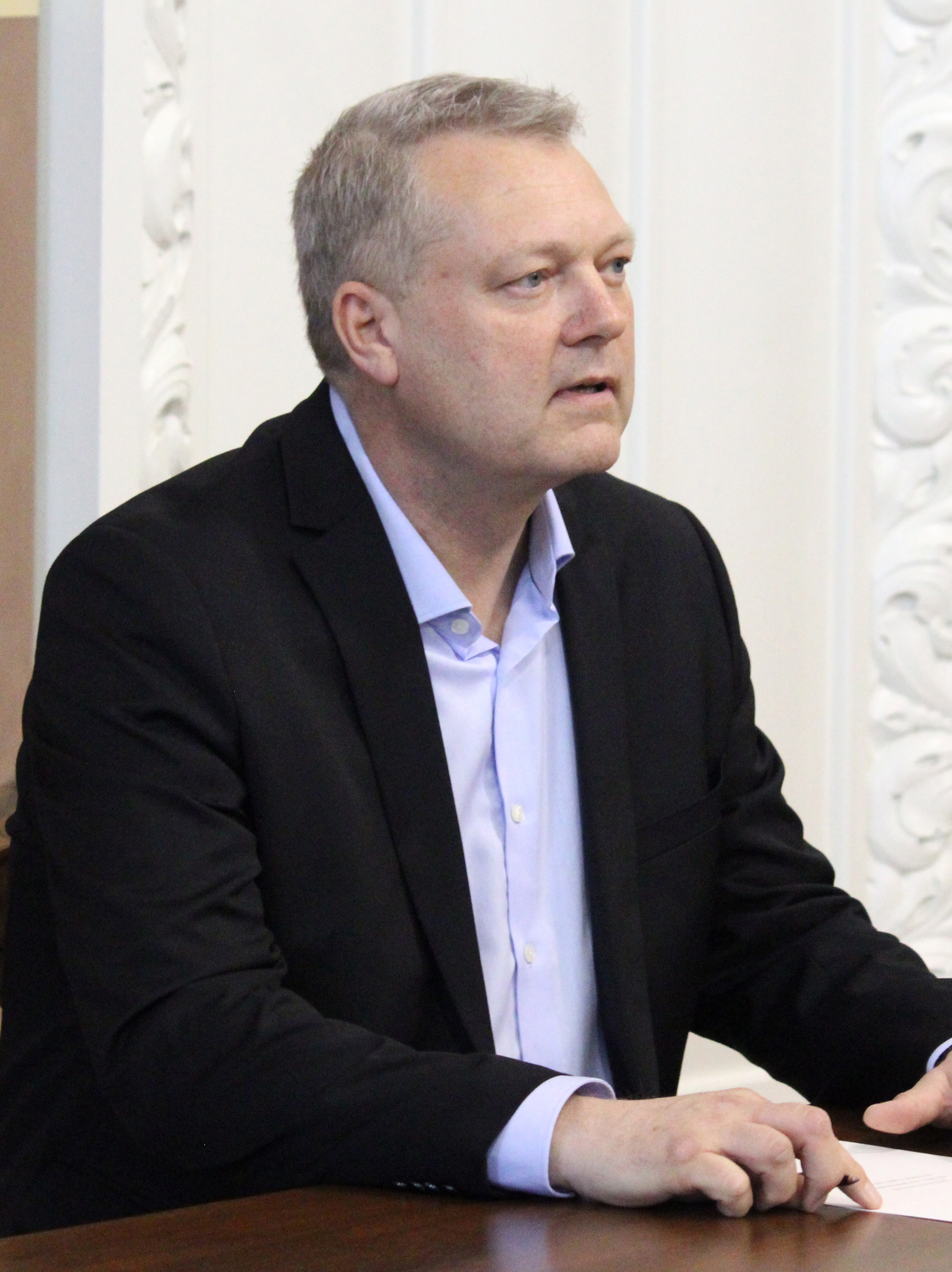
- Larsen in 2026

Member of the Folketing
- Incumbent
- Assumed office 24 March 2026
- Constituency: North Jutland

Personal details
- Born: 17 November 1971 (age 54)
- Party: Liberal Alliance

Peter Larsen (born 17 November 1971) is a Danish politician from the Liberal Alliance. He was elected to the Folketing in 2026. He is also a member of Thisted Municipal Council.

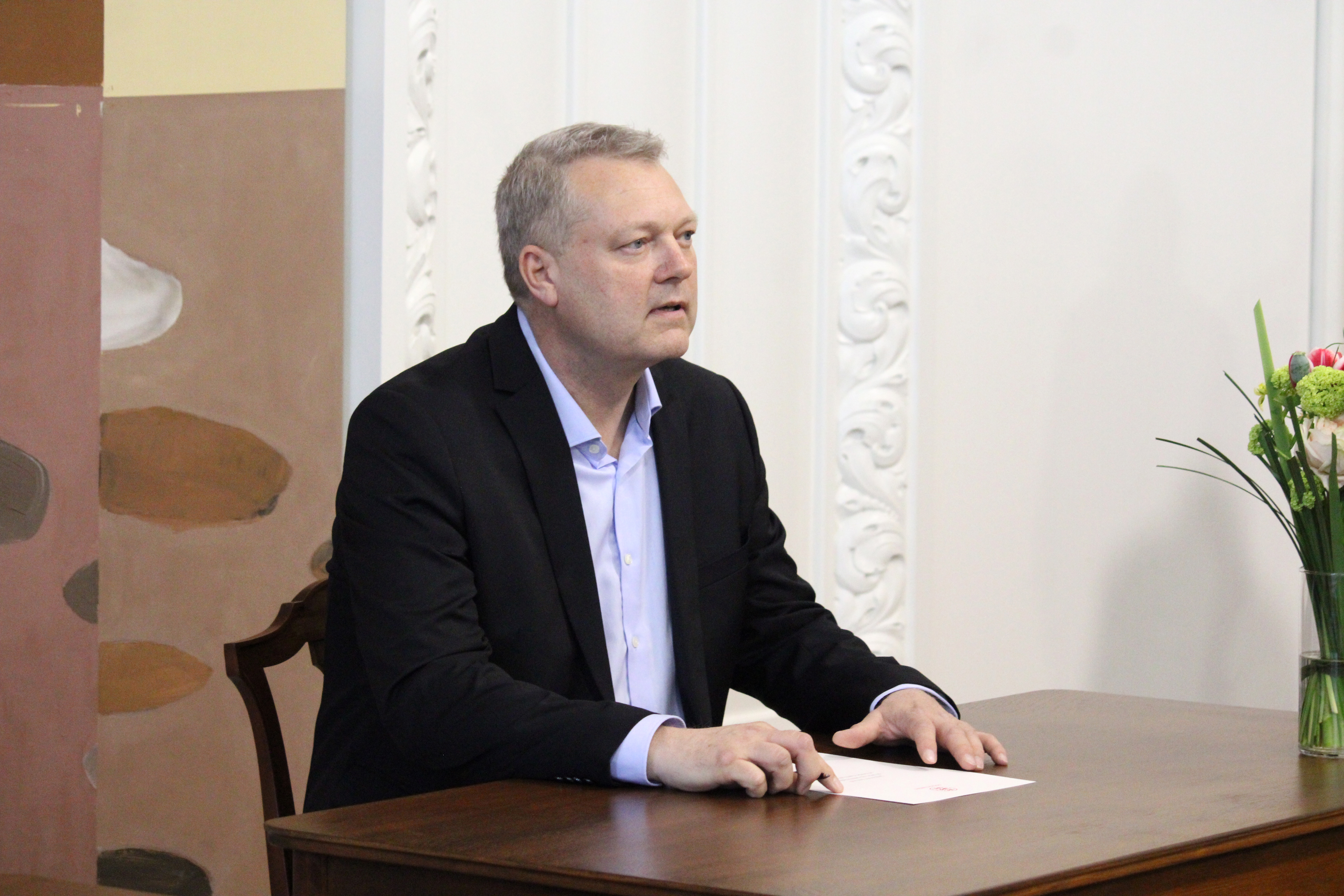
Larsen signing a pledge to uphold the Danish Constitution at Christiansborg, 14 April 2026

== See also ==
- List of members of the Folketing, 2026–present
