= Rune Bønnelykke =

Danish politician

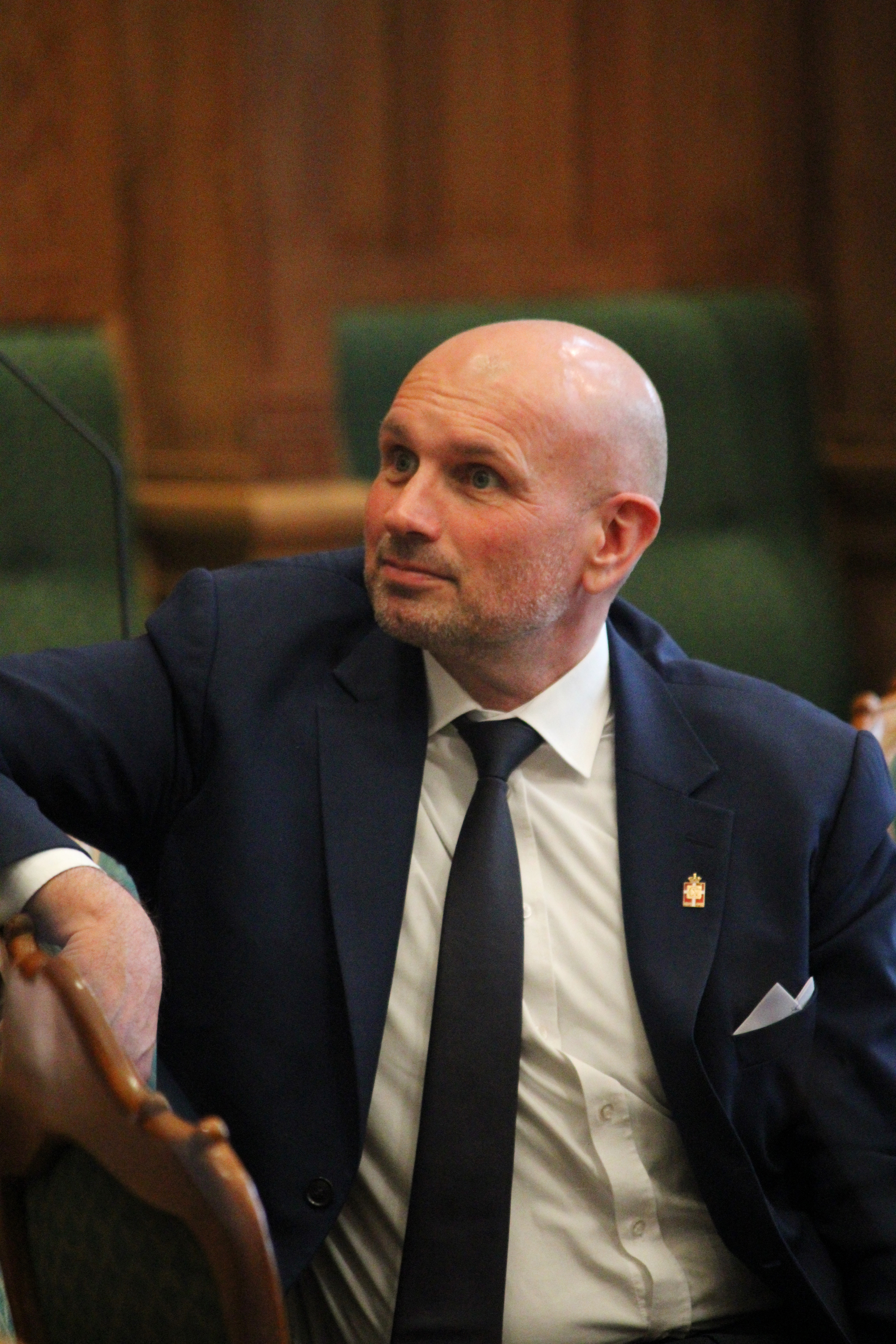
- Bønnelykke in 2026

Member of the Danish Parliament
- Incumbent
- Assumed office 24 March 2026
- Constituency: South Jutland

Personal details
- Born: 19 July 1972 (age 53)
- Party: Danish People's Party
- Other political affiliations: New Right (previously)

Rune Bønnelykke (born 19 July 1972) is a Danish politician from the Danish People's Party. He was elected to the Folketing in 2026. He was elected with 814 personal votes.

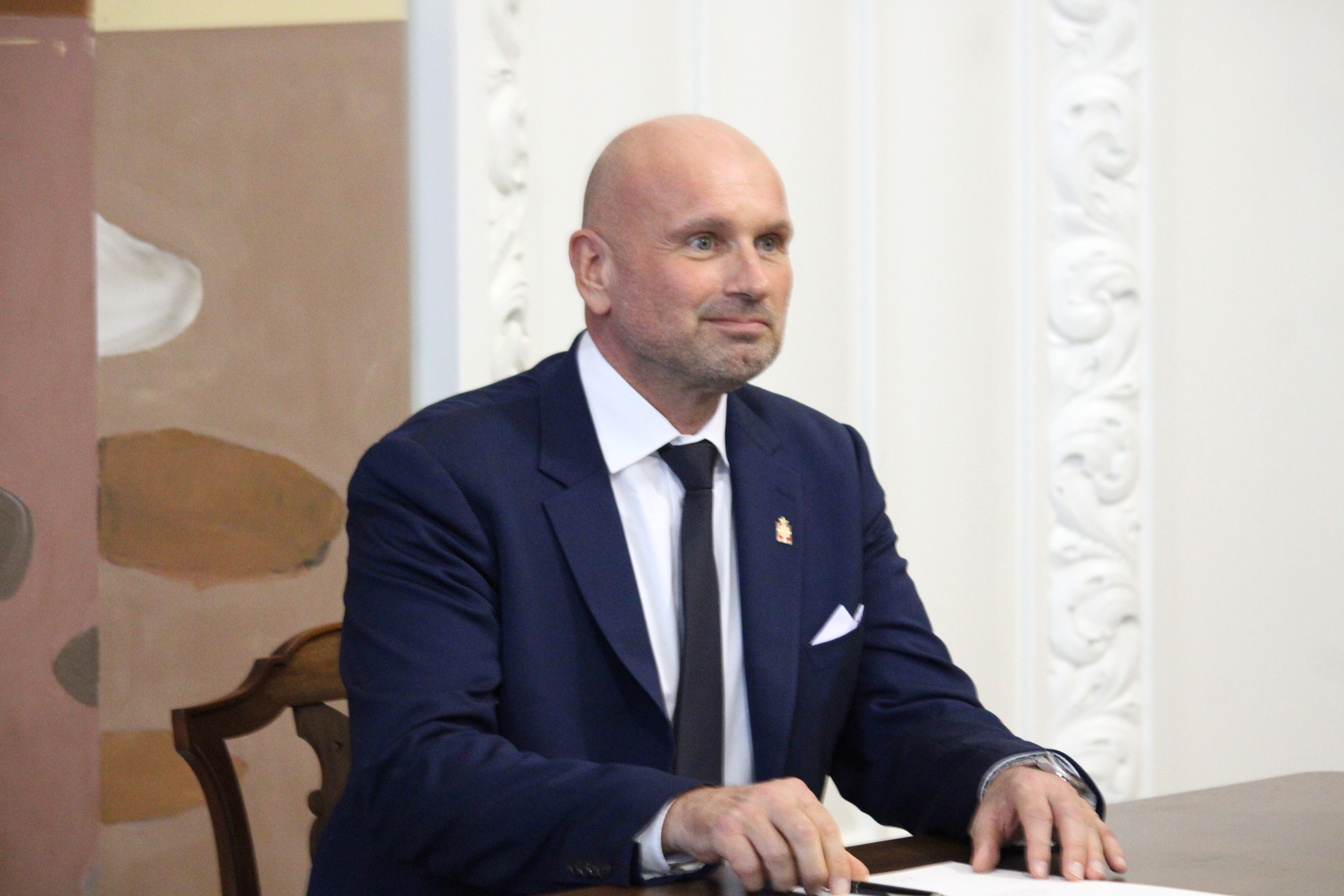
Bønnelykke signing a pledge to uphold the Danish Constitution at Christiansborg, 14 April 2026

He was previously a member of the New Right. He was a member of Vejle City Council. He was a candidate in the 2024 European Parliament election in Denmark.

== See also ==
- List of members of the Folketing, 2026–present
