= Anders Vistisen =

Danish politician (born 1987)

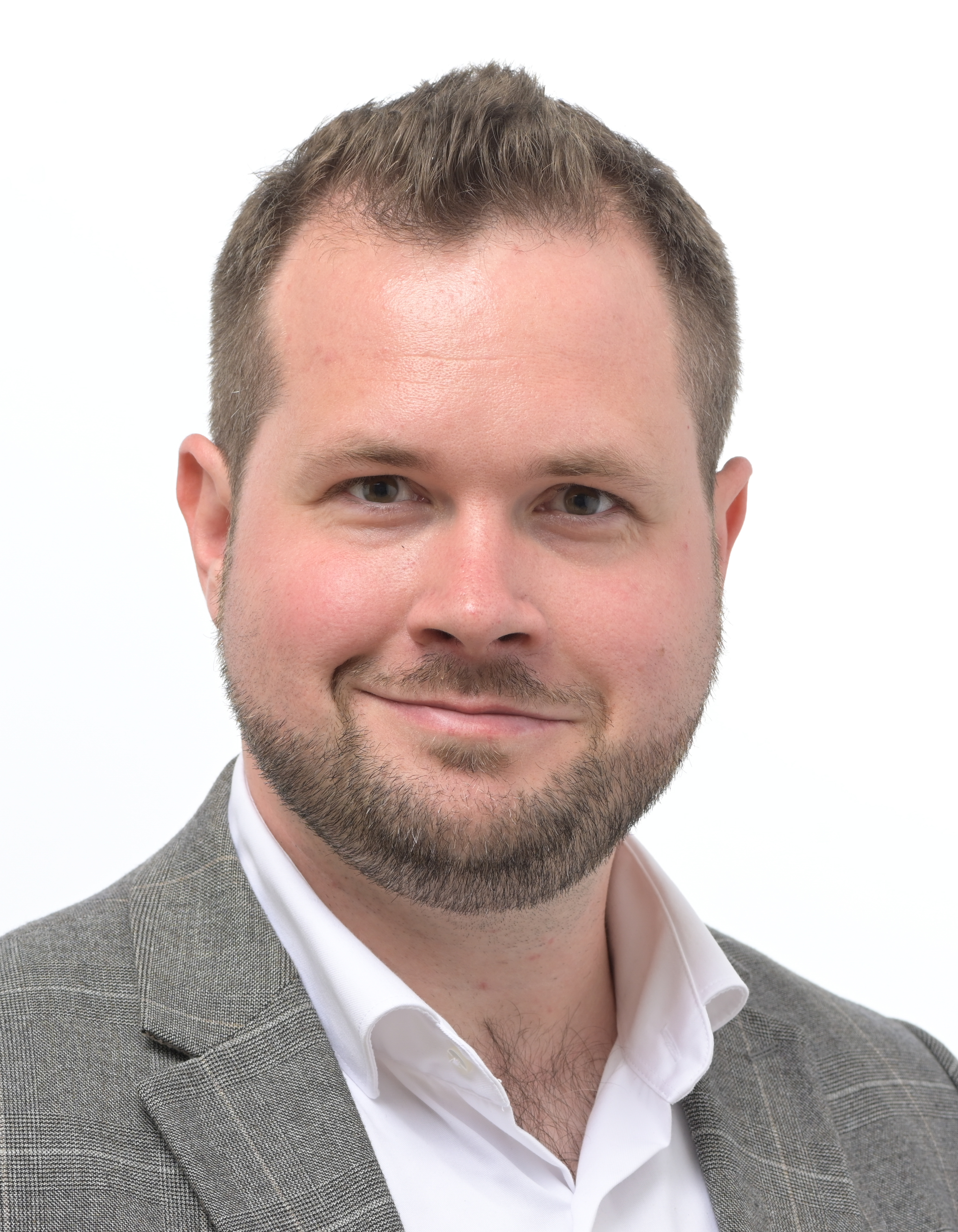
- Official portrait, 2024

Member of the European Parliament
- In office 22 November 2022 – 13 April 2026
- Preceded by: Peter Kofod
- Succeeded by: Majbritt Birkholm
- Constituency: Denmark
- In office 1 July 2014 – 1 July 2019
- Constituency: Denmark

Member of the Folketing
- Incumbent
- Assumed office 24 March 2026
- Constituency: North Jutland

Personal details
- Born: 12 November 1987 (age 38) Vridsted, Central Denmark Region, Denmark
- Party: Danish People's Party
- Education: University of Berlin
- Website: www.stemanders.dk

Anders Primdahl Vistisen (born 12 November 1987) is a Danish politician and Member of the European Parliament (MEP) from Denmark. He is a member of the Danish People's Party and was elected chief whip of the Patriots for Europe Group in the European Parliament. He was the Spids kandidat (lead candidate) selected to represent the Identity and Democracy group in the European Parliament election of 2024.

== Political career ==
He was the national chairman of the youth section of the party in the period 2012–2015. In 2013, he concluded his studies in Master of Laws from Aarhus University. In 2014 he was elected as member of the European Parliament for Denmark as a representative for European Conservatives and Reformists.

On 1 March 2018, Vistisen was one of three Danish MEPs who voted against a motion to encourage national parliaments to ban "gay conversion therapies".

In the 2019 European Parliament election, the Danish People's Party lost more than half of its votes and two of its three seats, including Vistisen's.

On 22 November 2022, Vistisen returned to the European Parliament, replacing Peter Kofod, who had been elected to the Folketing.

In 2024, Vistisen was selected as the lead candidate of the Identity and Democracy Party for the European Commission presidency and represented the party in the 2024 European Parliament election debates, including the Maastricht debate on 29 April. He was re-elected to the European Parliament with 55,082 preference votes. Following the election, he joined the newly formed Patriots for Europe group and served as a member of its Bureau.

In January 2025, during a debate regarding Trump's discussion about taking over Greenland, Vistisen gave a speech in which he said: "It is not for sale. Let me put it into words you might understand, Mr. Trump: fuck off." His speech later went viral on social media, though he was reprimanded by European Parliament Vice President Nicolae Ștefănuță for his use of profanity. He repeated the remark during a debate on Greenland in January 2026.

In the 2026 Danish general election, Vistisen was elected to the Folketing for the Danish People's Party. His election was incompatible with his membership of the European Parliament, and his European Parliament seat became vacant with effect from 14 April 2026. He was replaced by Majbritt Birkholm, who took up the seat with effect from 16 April. In the Folketing, he serves as finance spokesperson and legal affairs spokesperson and is deputy chair of the Finance Committee.
