= Julie Jacobsen (politician) =

Danish politician

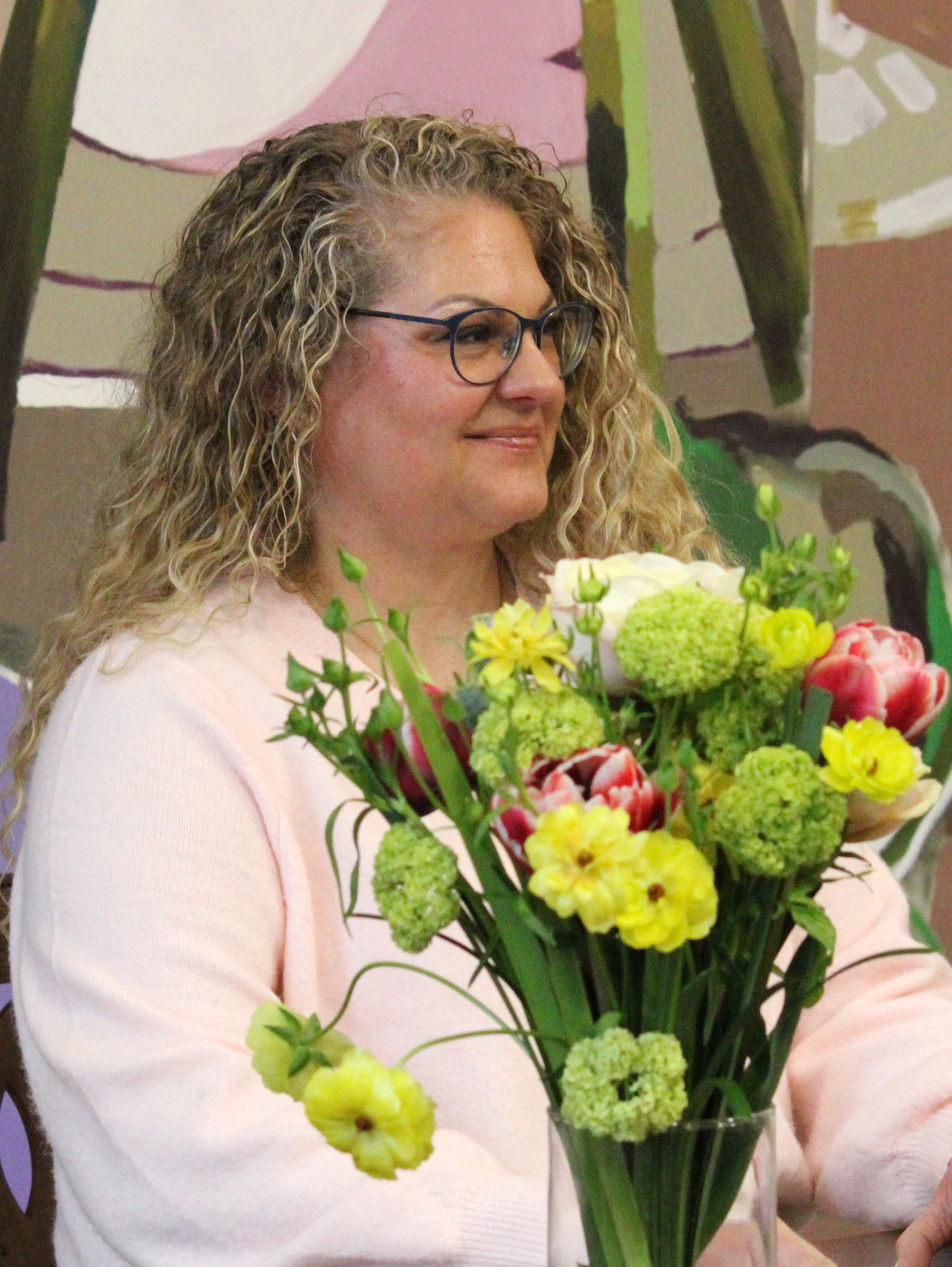

Member of the Danish Parliament
- Incumbent
- Assumed office 24 March 2026
- Constituency: Zealand

Personal details
- Born: 19 February 1985 (age 41)
- Party: Danish People's Party

Julie Jacobsen (born 19 February 1985) is a Danish politician from the Danish People's Party. She was elected to the Folketing in the 2026 Danish general election.

== See also ==
- List of members of the Folketing, 2026–present
