= Peter Kofod =

Danish politician (born 1990)

Peter Kofod MEP
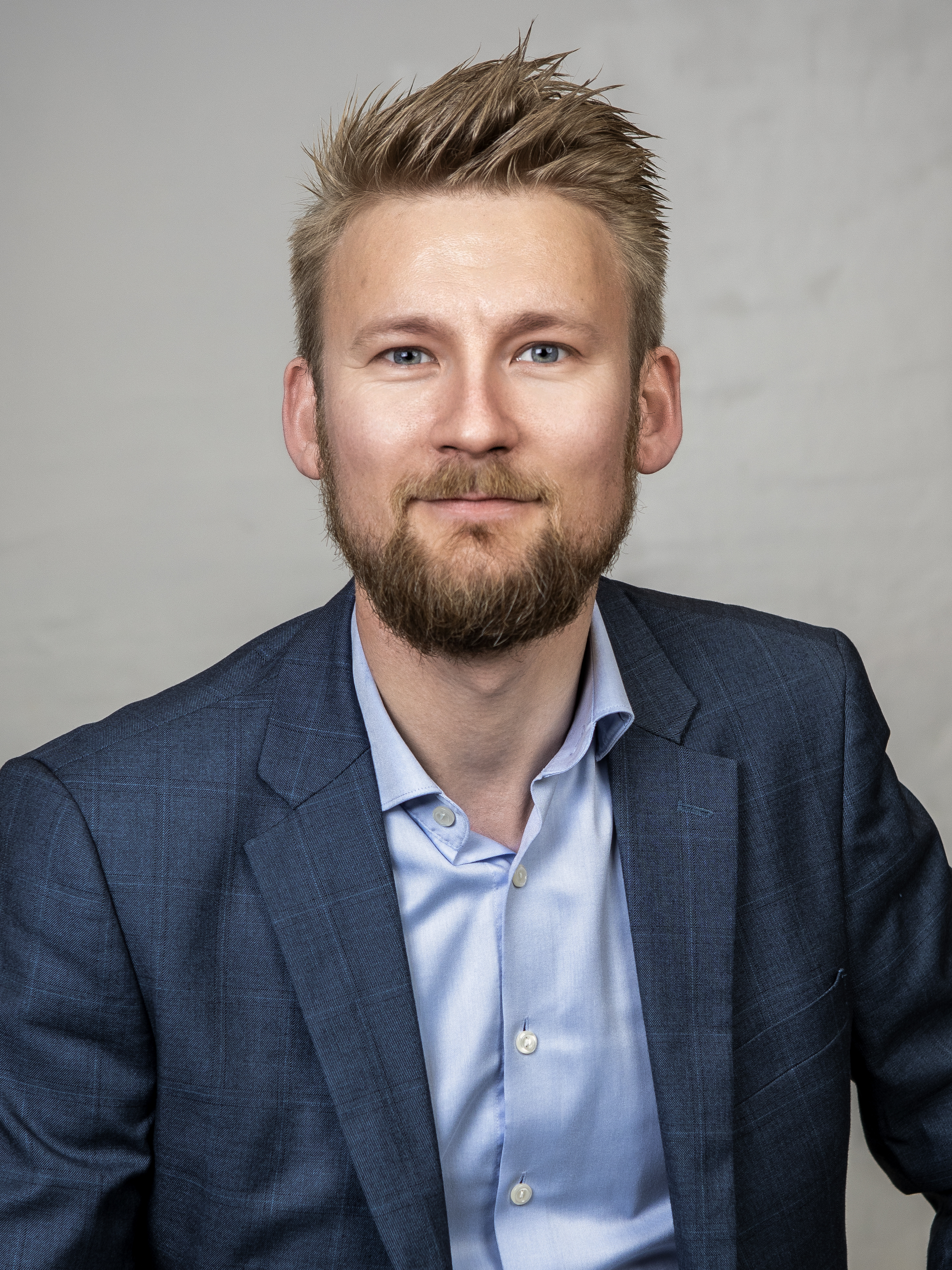
- Kofod in 2023

Member of the European Parliament for Denmark
- In office 1 July 2019 – 14 November 2022
- Succeeded by: Anders Vistisen

Member of the Folketing
- Incumbent
- Assumed office 15 November 2022
- Constituency: South Jutland

Personal details
- Born: Peter Kofod Poulsen; 27 February 1990 (age 36) Snogebæk, Denmark
- Party: Danish People's Party
- Spouse: Josephine Alstrup Kofod (m. 2025)

Peter Kofod Hristov (born Peter Kofod Poulsen, 27 February 1990) is a Danish politician who was elected as a Member of the European Parliament in 2019. He served in the Folketing from June 2015 to June 2019.

During his term in the Folketing, he represented the Danish People's Party (DPP). As of July 2019, the DPP is on the parliamentary group Identity and Democracy. At the 2022 general election, he was once again elected a member of the Folketing.

== Biography ==
Born in Snogebæk on Bornholm and as the son of a blacksmith and nurse, Peter Kofod graduated from the Signal Regiment in 2010 and later worked as a primary school teacher in Haderslev. He was a city councillor in Haderslev Municipality beginning in 2014, and was in the regional council for Southern Denmark from 2014–2015.

He adopted the surname Hristov when he married his wife Vasileva in 2018 but did not use the name in political contexts. At the 2022 general election, Kofod was once again elected a member of the Folketing with 3,887 person votes in South Jutland. On 10 November, it was announced that he and Vasileva had agreed to divorce.
