= Josephine Alstrup Kofod =

Danish politician (born 1999)

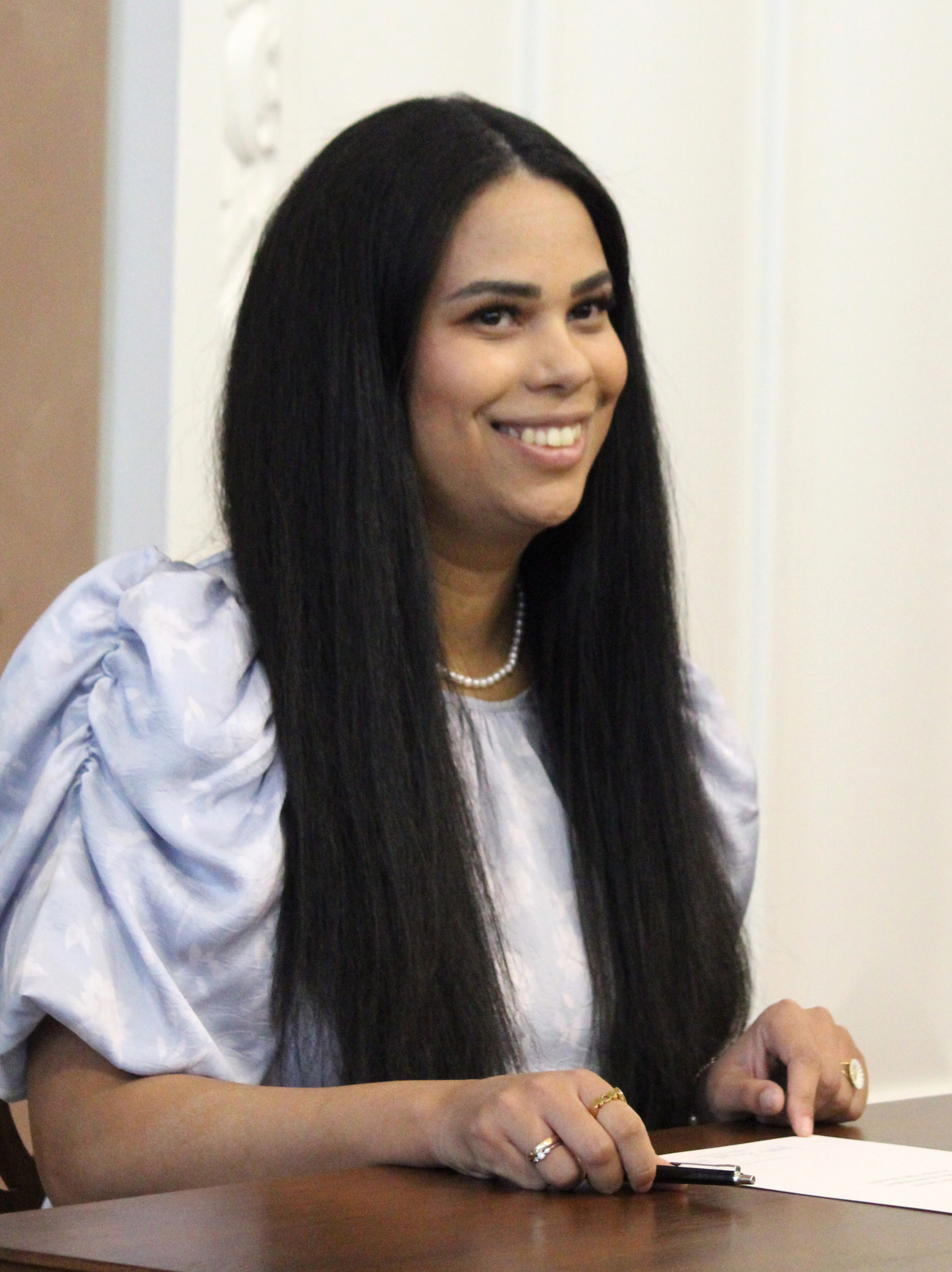
- Kofod in 2026

Member of the Folketing
- Incumbent
- Assumed office 24 March 2026
- Constituency: South Jutland

Personal details
- Born: 11 February 1999 (age 27)
- Party: Danish People's Party
- Spouse: Peter Kofod (m. 2025)

Josephine Alstrup Kofod (née Alstrup; born 11 February 1999) is a Danish politician who was elected member of the Folketing in 2026. She has been married to Peter Kofod since 2025.
