= Marie Brixtofte =

Danish politician (born 1979)

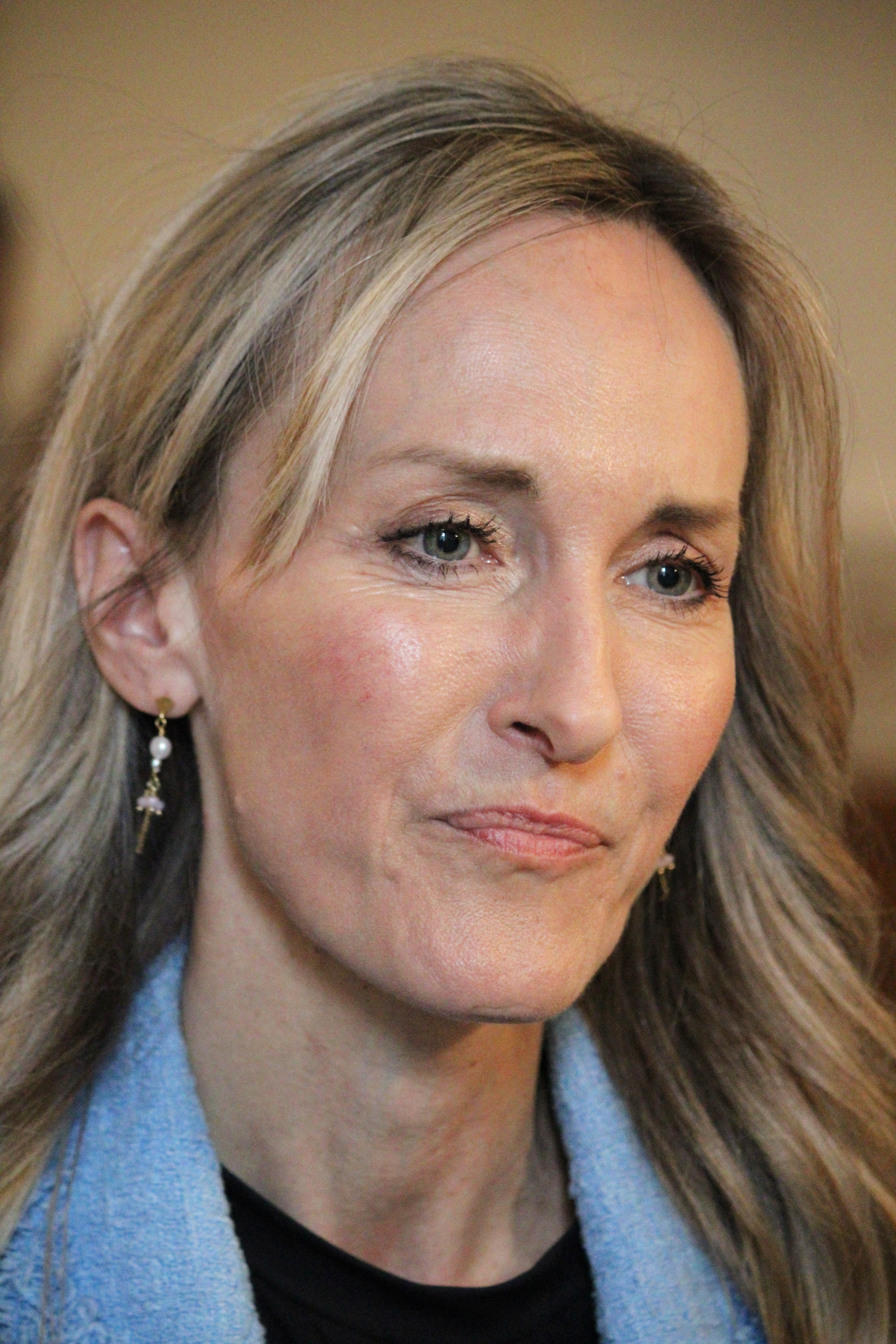
- Brixtofte in 2026

Member of the Folketing
- Incumbent
- Assumed office 24 March 2026
- Constituency: Greater Copenhagen

Personal details
- Born: 12 January 1979 (age 47)
- Party: Venstre
- Parent: Peter Brixtofte (father)

Marie Brixtofte (born 12 January 1979) is a Danish politician serving as a member of the Folketing since 2026. She is the daughter of Peter Brixtofte.
