= Cecilie Liv Hansen =

Danish politician (born 2001)

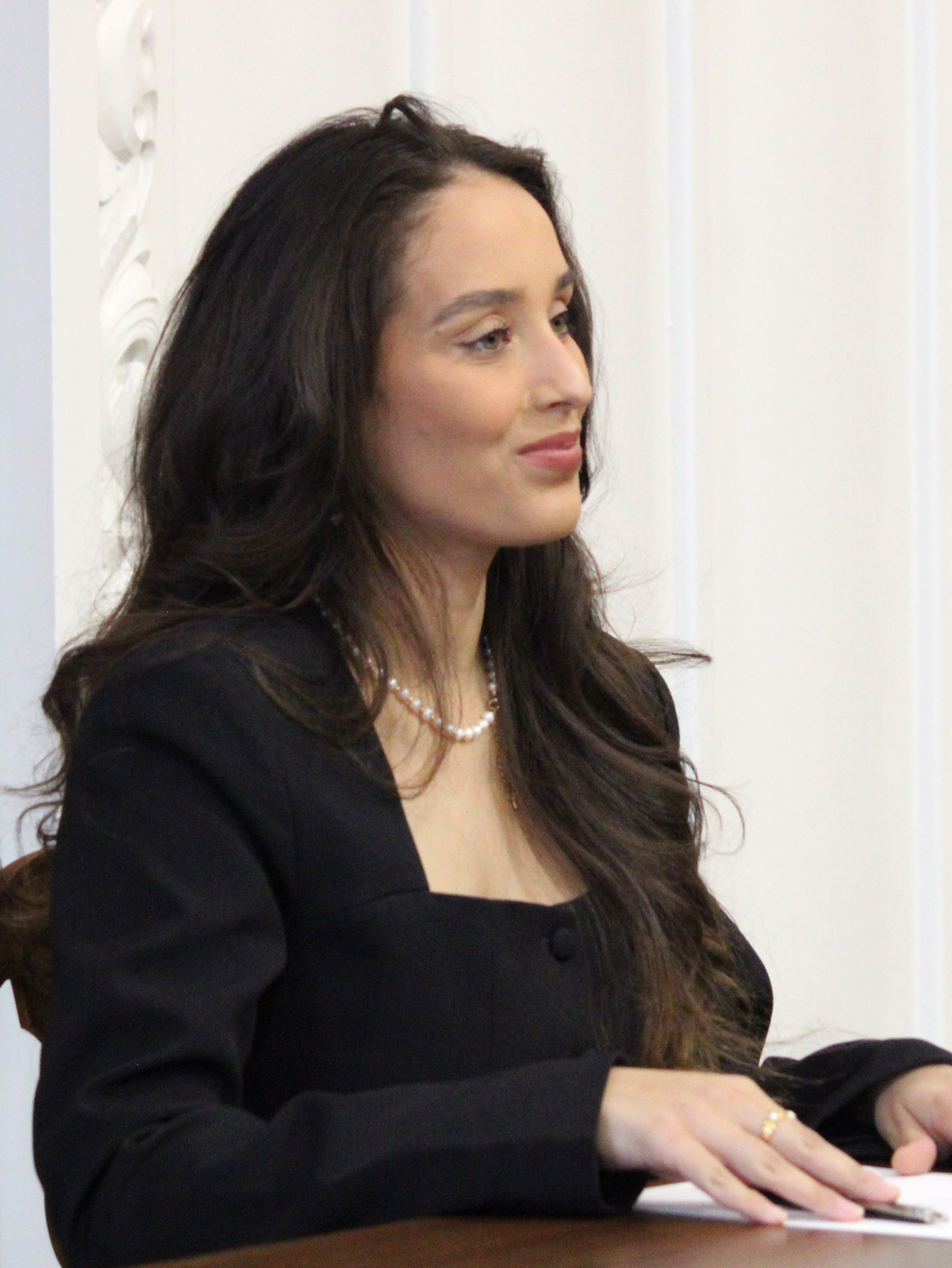
- Cecilie Liv Hansen signing a pledge to uphold the Danish Constitution in Landstingssalen at Christiansborg in Copenhagen, Denmark.

Member of the Folketing
- Incumbent
- Assumed office 24 March 2026
- Constituency: South Jutland

Personal details
- Born: 15 August 2001 (age 25) Kolding, Denmark
- Party: Independent
- Other political affiliations: Liberal Alliance (until 2026)

Cecilie Liv Hansen (born 15 August 2001) is a Danish politician who was elected member of the Folketing in 2026. She received 2,569 personal votes. She has been a regional councillor of Southern Denmark and a municipal councillor of Kolding since 2025.

On 28 March 2026, four days after the election, she was expelled from the Liberal Alliance for giving them "false information on her personal life," which later reporting revealed to be that her partner had sold drugs, including cannabis.

== Private ==
She has a degree in international commerce. She has three children.
