= List of members of the Folketing, 2022–2026 =

71st Folketing
- Term: 1 November 2022 - 24 March 2026
- Speaker: V Søren Gade
- Prime Minister: A Mette Frederiksen
- Cabinet: Frederiksen II
- Previous: 2019–2022
- Next: 2026–present

This is a list of the 179 members of the Folketing in the 2022 session. They were elected at the 2022 Danish general election.

== Election results ==
Party	Votes	%	Seats	+/–
Denmark proper
Social Democrats	971,995	27.50	50	+2
Venstre	470,546	13.32	23	–20
Moderates	327,699	9.27	16	New
Green Left	293,186	8.30	15	+1
Denmark Democrats	286,796	8.12	14	New
Liberal Alliance	278,656	7.89	14	+10
Conservative People's Party	194,820	5.51	10	–2
Red–Green Alliance	181,452	5.13	9	–4
Danish Social Liberal Party	133,931	3.79	7	–9
Nye Borgerlige	129,524	3.67	6	+2
The Alternative	117,567	3.33	6	+1
Danish People's Party	93,428	2.64	5	–11
Independent Greens	31,787	0.90	0	New
Christian Democrats	18,276	0.52	0	0
Independents^{da}	4,288	0.12	0	0
Total	3,533,951	100.00	175	0
Valid votes	3,533,951	98.36		
Invalid votes	12,599	0.35		
Blank votes	46,272	1.29		
Total votes	3,592,822	100.00		
Registered voters/turnout	4,269,048	84.16		
Source: DST
Faroe Islands
Union Party	8,198	30.19	1	0
Social Democratic Party	7,659	28.20	1	0
Republic	4,927	18.14	0	0
People's Party	4,222	15.55	0	0
Centre Party	1,217	4.48	0	New
Progress	936	3.45	0	0
Total	27,159	100.00	2	0
Valid votes	27,159	99.20		
Invalid votes	73	0.27		
Blank votes	146	0.53		
Total votes	27,378	100.00		
Registered voters/turnout	38,387	71.32		
Source: kvf.fo
Greenland
Siumut	7,424	38.58	1	0
Inuit Ataqatigiit	4,852	25.21	1	0
Democrats	3,656	19.00	0	0
Naleraq	2,416	12.55	0	0
Atassut	720	3.74	0	0
Cooperation Party	176	0.91	0	0
Total	19,244	100.00	2	0
Valid votes	19,244	97.52		
Invalid votes	197	1.00		
Blank votes	293	1.48		
Total votes	19,734	100.00		
Registered voters/turnout	41,305	47.78		
Source: Qinersineq

== Seat distribution ==
Below is the distribution of the 179 seats as it appeared after the 2022 election, as well as the distribution at the end of the legislative term.

Party	Party leader	Group leader	Political spokesperson	Elected seats	Seats at the end	Change
A Social Democrats	Mette Frederiksen	Leif Lahn Jensen	Rasmus Stoklund	50	50	Steady
B Social Liberal Party	Martin Lidegaard			7	6	▼1
C Conservatives	Mona Juul	Mona Juul	Mette Abildgaard	10	10	Steady
D Nye Borgerlige	Mandate terminated			6	0	▼6
F Green Left	Pia Olsen Dyhr	Karina Lorentzen Dehnhardt	Karsten Hønge	15	15	Steady
H Citizens' Party	Lars Boje Mathiesen			0	1	▲1
I Liberal Alliance	Alex Vanopslagh	Ole Birk Olesen	Sólbjørg Jakobsen	14	15	▲1
M Moderates	Lars Løkke Rasmussen	Henrik Frandsen	Monika Rubin	16	12	▼4
O Danish People's Party	Morten Messerschmidt	Peter Kofod	Morten Messerschmidt	5	7	▲2
V Liberals	Troels Lund Poulsen	Lars Christian Lilleholt	Torsten Schack Pedersen	23	23	Steady
Æ Denmark Democrats	Inger Støjberg	Peter Skaarup	Susie Jessen	14	16	▲2
Ø Red-Green Alliance	Pelle Dragsted (Note: Formally, the Red-Green Alliance have collective leadership, but Dragsted is their political spokesperson, and de facto leader of the party.)	Trine Mach	Pelle Dragsted	9	9	Steady
Å The Alternative	Franciska Rosenkilde	Torsten Gejl	Helene Brydensholt	6	6	Steady
JF Social Democratic Party	Aksel V Johannesen	Sjúrður Skaale		1	1	Steady
SP Union Party	Bárður á Steig Nielsen	Anna Falkenberg		1	1	Steady
IA Community of the People	Múte Bourup Egede	Aaja Chemnitz		1	1	Steady
SI Forward	Erik Jensen	Mandate terminated		1	0	▼1
NA Naleraq	Pele Broberg	Aki-Matilda Høegh-Dam		0	1	▲1
. Outside group	N/A			0	5	▲5

== Parliament members elected at the November 2022 election ==
The list of new or re-elected parliament members.

Name	Personal votes	Party	Constituency
Mette Frederiksen	60,837	A Social Democrats	North Jutland
Magnus Heunicke	22,102	A Social Democrats	Zealand
Nicolai Wammen	18,022	A Social Democrats	East Jutland
Mattias Tesfaye	13,948	A Social Democrats	Greater Copenhagen
Bjørn Brandenborg	11,167	A Social Democrats	Funen
Benny Engelbrecht	10,657	A Social Democrats	South Jutland
Simon Kollerup	9,947	A Social Democrats	North Jutland
Ida Auken	9,879	A Social Democrats	Copenhagen
Annette Lind	9,797	A Social Democrats	West Jutland
Peter Hummelgaard	9,321	A Social Democrats	Copenhagen
Kaare Dybvad Bek	8,891	A Social Democrats	Zealand
Jesper Petersen	8,701	A Social Democrats	South Jutland
Morten Bødskov	8,489	A Social Democrats	Greater Copenhagen
Dan Jørgensen	8,256	A Social Democrats	Funen
Astrid Krag	7,872	A Social Democrats	Zealand
Christian Rabjerg Madsen	7,643	A Social Democrats	South Jutland
Bjarne Laustsen	7,601	A Social Democrats	North Jutland
Leif Lahn Jensen	7,443	A Social Democrats	East Jutland
Anders Kronborg	7,407	A Social Democrats	South Jutland
Birgitte Vind	7,116	A Social Democrats	South Jutland
Anne Paulin	6,905	A Social Democrats	East Jutland
Trine Bramsen	6,456	A Social Democrats	Funen
Jens Joel	6,418	A Social Democrats	East Jutland
Mogens Jensen	6,413	A Social Democrats	West Jutland
Malte Larsen	6,313	A Social Democrats	East Jutland
Kasper Roug	6,278	A Social Democrats	Zealand
Flemming Møller Mortensen	6,194	A Social Democrats	North Jutland
Thomas Jensen	5,083	A Social Democrats	West Jutland
Fie Hækkerup	5,789	A Social Democrats	North Zealand
Thomas Monberg	5,479	A Social Democrats	East Jutland
Ane Halsboe-Jørgensen	5,469	A Social Democrats	North Jutland
Pernille Rosenkrantz-Theil	5,361	A Social Democrats	Copenhagen
Sara Emil Baaring	5,247	A Social Democrats	Funen
Mette Gjerskov	5,244	A Social Democrats	Zealand
Frederik Vad	5,082	A Social Democrats	Zealand
Rasmus Horn Langhoff	4,931	A Social Democrats	Zealand
Rasmus Stoklund	4,647	A Social Democrats	North Zealand
Camilla Fabricius	4,510	A Social Democrats	East Jutland
Jeppe Bruus	4,507	A Social Democrats	Greater Copenhagen
Matilde Powers	4,221	A Social Democrats	North Zealand
Henrik Møller	4,218	A Social Democrats	North Zealand
Thomas Skriver Jensen	3,627	A Social Democrats	Funen
Kris Jensen Skriver	3,723	A Social Democrats	South Jutland
Lea Wermelin	3,580	A Social Democrats	Bornholm
Mette Reissmann	3,347	A Social Democrats	Copenhagen
Kasper Sand Kjær	2,930	A Social Democrats	Greater Copenhagen
Maria Durhuus	2,616	A Social Democrats	Greater Copenhagen
Kim Aas	2,337	A Social Democrats	Funen
Per Husted	2,221	A Social Democrats	North Jutland
Rasmus Prehn	1,899	A Social Democrats	North Jutland
Jakob Ellemann-Jensen	20,945	V Venstre	East Jutland
Søren Gade	17,998	V Venstre	West Jutland
Sophie Løhde	12,210	V Venstre	North Zealand
Preben Bang Henriksen	10,644	V Venstre	North Jutland
Marie Bjerre	9,744	V Venstre	North Jutland
Anni Matthiesen	9,540	V Venstre	South Jutland
Karen Ellemann	8,716	V Venstre	Greater Copenhagen
Thomas Danielsen	7,568	V Venstre	West Jutland
Mads Fuglede	6,981	V Venstre	West Jutland
Erling Bonnesen	6,489	V Venstre	Funen
Christoffer Aagaard Melson	6,460	V Venstre	South Jutland
Jacob Jensen	5,797	V Venstre	Zealand
Michael Aastrup Jensen	5,795	V Venstre	East Jutland
Morten Dahlin	5,466	V Venstre	Zealand
Torsten Schack Pedersen	5,248	V Venstre	North Jutland
Hans Christian Schmidt	5,084	V Venstre	South Jutland
Lars Christian Lilleholt	5,017	V Venstre	Funen
Louise Schack Elholm	4,702	V Venstre	Zealand
Troels Lund Poulsen	4,584	V Venstre	East Jutland
Jan E. Jørgensen	4,270	V Venstre	Copenhagen
Hans Andersen	4,031	V Venstre	North Zealand
Peter Juel-Jensen	3,849	V Venstre	Bornholm
Linea Søgaard-Lidell	3,719	V Venstre	Copenhagen
Lars Løkke Rasmussen	38,439	M Moderates	Zealand
Henrik Frandsen	6,206	M Moderates	South Jutland
Rosa Eriksen	4,469	M Moderates	Funen
Jakob Engel-Schmidt	4,252	M Moderates	North Zealand
Tobias Elmstrøm	4,085	M Moderates	East Jutland
Monika Rubin	3,376	M Moderates	Copenhagen
Karin Liltorp	3,375	M Moderates	East Jutland
Mette Kierkgaard	2,935	M Moderates	South Jutland
Jeppe Søe	2,452	M Moderates	West Jutland
Nanna Gotfredsen	2,333	M Moderates	Copenhagen
Rasmus Lund-Nielsen	1,874	M Moderates	Copenhagen
Charlotte Bagge Hansen	2,187	M Moderates	Zealand
Kristian Klarskov	1,772	M Moderates	North Jutland
Jon Stephensen	1,550	M Moderates	Copenhagen
Peter Have	952	M Moderates	East Jutland
Mike Fonseca	505	M Moderates	Zealand
Jacob Mark	31,235	F Socialist People's Party	Zealand
Pia Olsen Dyhr	18,758	F Socialist People's Party	Copenhagen
Kirsten Normann Andersen	8,693	F Socialist People's Party	East Jutland
Signe Munk	8,032	F Socialist People's Party	West Jutland
Karsten Hønge	5,215	F Socialist People's Party	Funen
Karina Lorentzen Dehnhardt	5,139	F Socialist People's Party	South Jutland
Theresa Berg Andersen	4,115	F Socialist People's Party	North Jutland
Charlotte Broman Mølbak	2,982	F Socialist People's Party	East Jutland
Sigurd Agersnap	2,857	F Socialist People's Party	Greater Copenhagen
Marianne Bigum	2,823	F Socialist People's Party	North Zealand
Carl Valentin	2,631	F Socialist People's Party	Copenhagen
Sofie Lippert	2,338	F Socialist People's Party	East Jutland
Lisbeth Bech-Nielsen	2,279	F Socialist People's Party	Copenhagen
Astrid Carø	2,111	F Socialist People's Party	Zealand
Anne Valentina Berthelsen	1,383	F Socialist People's Party	Zealand
Inger Støjberg	47,211	Æ Denmark Democrats	North Jutland
Dennis Flydtkjær	7,501	Æ Denmark Democrats	West Jutland
Peter Skaarup	7,341	Æ Denmark Democrats	Zealand
Søren Espersen	4,996	Æ Denmark Democrats	South Jutland
Karina Adsbøl	3,567	Æ Denmark Democrats	South Jutland
Hans Kristian Skibby	3,112	Æ Denmark Democrats	East Jutland
Jens Henrik Thulesen Dahl	2,210	Æ Denmark Democrats	Funen
Betina Kastbjerg	2,037	Æ Denmark Democrats	West Jutland
Marlene Harpsøe	1,669	Æ Denmark Democrats	North Zealand
Susie Jessen	1,195	Æ Denmark Democrats	Zealand
Kenneth Fredslund Pedersen	782	Æ Denmark Democrats	South Jutland
Charlotte Munch	648	Æ Denmark Democrats	Greater Copenhagen
Lise Bech	521	Æ Denmark Democrats	North Jutland
Kristian Bøgsted	480	Æ Denmark Democrats	North Jutland
Alex Vanopslagh	38,284	I Liberal Alliance	East Jutland
Henrik Dahl	5,779	I Liberal Alliance	South Jutland
Ole Birk Olesen	5,488	I Liberal Alliance	Copenhagen
Sólbjørg Jakobsen	4,421	I Liberal Alliance	North Jutland
Lars-Christian Brask	3,442	I Liberal Alliance	Zealand
Katrine Daugaard	2,861	I Liberal Alliance	Funen
Steffen Frølund	2,120	I Liberal Alliance	North Zealand
Carsten Bach	2,103	I Liberal Alliance	West Jutland
Alexander Ryle	1,948	I Liberal Alliance	Copenhagen
Jens Meilvang	1,642	I Liberal Alliance	East Jutland
Steffen Larsen	1,500	I Liberal Alliance	Copenhagen
Helena Artmann Andersen	1,143	I Liberal Alliance	South Jutland
Louise Brown	1,085	I Liberal Alliance	East Jutland
Sandra Skalvig	854	I Liberal Alliance	Zealand
Søren Pape Poulsen	15,767	C Conservatives	West Jutland
Mette Abildgaard	6,376	C Conservatives	North Zealand
Rasmus Jarlov	5,216	C Conservatives	Greater Copenhagen
Mai Mercado	4,426	C Conservatives	Funen
Mona Juul	3,695	C Conservatives	East Jutland
Helle Bonnesen	2,783	C Conservatives	Copenhagen
Niels Flemming Hansen	2,452	C Conservatives	South Jutland
Per Larsen	2,384	C Conservatives	North Jutland
Brigitte Klintskov Jerkel	1,965	C Conservatives	Zealand
Lise Bertelsen	1,894	C Conservatives	West Jutland
Pelle Dragsted	14,129	Ø Red-Green Alliance	Copenhagen
Mai Villadsen	10,822	Ø Red-Green Alliance	North Zealand
Rosa Lund	9,670	Ø Red-Green Alliance	Copenhagen
Victoria Velásquez	3,416	Ø Red-Green Alliance	Funen
Peder Hvelplund	1,978	Ø Red-Green Alliance	North Jutland
Søren Søndergaard	1,788	Ø Red-Green Alliance	Greater Copenhagen
Trine Mach	1,737	Ø Red-Green Alliance	Zealand
Jette Gottlieb	1,147	Ø Red-Green Alliance	Copenhagen
Søren Egge Rasmussen	264	Ø Red-Green Alliance	East Jutland
Martin Lidegaard	7,167	B Social Liberal Party	North Zealand
Samira Nawa	6,302	B Social Liberal Party	Copenhagen
Katrine Robsøe	3,736	B Social Liberal Party	East Jutland
Zenia Stampe	2,638	B Social Liberal Party	Zealand
Lotte Rod	2,714	B Social Liberal Party	South Jutland
Sofie Carsten Nielsen	2,467	B Social Liberal Party	Greater Copenhagen
Christian Friis Bach	1,489	B Social Liberal Party	North Jutland
Pernille Vermund	15,375	D Nye Borgerlige	South Jutland
Lars Boje Mathiesen	11,150	D Nye Borgerlige	East Jutland
Kim Edberg Andersen	5,218	D Nye Borgerlige	North Jutland
Mette Thiesen	4,357	D Nye Borgerlige	North Zealand
Peter Seier Christensen	2,806	D Nye Borgerlige	Zealand
Mikkel Bjørn	888	D Nye Borgerlige	Funen
Franciska Rosenkilde	15,699	Å The Alternative	Copenhagen
Christina Olumeko	3,476	Å The Alternative	Copenhagen
Torsten Gejl	3,444	Å The Alternative	East Jutland
Helene Liliendahl Brydensholt	1,183	Å The Alternative	North Zealand
Sasha Faxe	1,129	Å The Alternative	Zealand
Theresa Scavenius	1,081	Å The Alternative	North Jutland
Morten Messerschmidt	6,722	O Danish People's Party	Greater Copenhagen
Pia Kjærsgaard	6,084	O Danish People's Party	Zealand
Peter Kofod	3,887	O Danish People's Party	South Jutland
Alex Ahrendtsen	1,477	O Danish People's Party	Funen
Nick Zimmermann	1,039	O Danish People's Party	East Jutland
Aki-Matilda Høegh-Dam	6,655	SI Forward	Greenland
Aaja Chemnitz	4,289	IA Community of the People	Greenland
Anna Falkenberg	2,973	SP Union Party	Faroe Islands
Sjúrður Skaale	3,804	JF Social Democratic Party	Faroe Islands

== Party and member changes after the November 2022 elections ==
=== Party changes ===
Below are all parliament members that have joined another party or become independent during the term.

Name	Shift from	Shift to	Date
Mette Thiesen	D Nye Borgerlige	. Independent	7 November 2022
Mette Thiesen	. Independent	O Danish People's Party	6 February 2023
Mikkel Bjørn	D Nye Borgerlige	O Danish People's Party	24 January 2023
Lars Boje Mathiesen	D Nye Borgerlige	. Independent	9 March 2023
Lars Boje Mathiesen	. Independent	H Citizens' Party	28 August 2024
Jon Stephensen	M Moderates	. Independent	17 August 2023
Theresa Scavenius	Å The Alternative	. Independent	21 September 2023
Mike Fonseca	M Moderates	. Independent	17 November 2023
Pernille Vermund	D Nye Borgerlige	. Independent	10 January 2024
Pernille Vermund	. Independent	I Liberal Alliance	17 January 2024
Peter Seier Christensen	D Nye Borgerlige	. Independent	10 January 2024
Kim Edberg Andersen	D Nye Borgerlige	. Independent	16 January 2024
Kim Edberg Andersen	. Independent	Æ Denmark Democrats	19 March 2024
Mads Fuglede	V Liberals	Æ Denmark Democrats	19 March 2024
Christian Friis Bach	B Social Liberal Party	V Liberals	5 August 2024
Jeppe Søe	M Moderates	. Independent	5 September 2024
Aki-Matilda Høegh-Dam	SI Siumut	NA Naleraq	10 February 2025
Karin Liltorp	M Moderates	. Independent	23 February 2025
Karin Liltorp	. Independent	Å The Alternative	4 March 2025

=== Lasting member changes ===
Below are member changes that will last through the entire term.

Replacement	Party	Replaced MP	Date	Reason
Kim Valentin	V Venstre	Karen Ellemann	14 November 2022	Resigned due to new job as Secretary-General for Nordic Council of Ministers
Mohammad Rona	M Moderates	Kristian Klarskov	23 November 2022	Resigned due to allegations of fake credentials
Stinus Lindgreen	B Social Liberal Party	Sofie Carsten Nielsen	1 May 2023	Resigned due to new job as Bio-Project Director in Confederation of Danish Industry
Tanja Larsson	A Social Democrats	Mette Gjerskov	13 June 2023	Deceased due to illness.
Heidi Bank	V Venstre	Jakob Ellemann-Jensen	23 October 2023	Resigned as leader of the Venstre party.
Gunvor Wibroe	A Social Democrats	Kasper Sand Kjær	2 November 2023	Resigned from politics.
Karin Gaardsted	A Social Democrats	Annette Lind	1 March 2024	Resigned due to new job as Danish Consul to Flensburg
Dina Raabjerg	C Conservatives	Søren Pape Poulsen	3 March 2024	Deceased due to a cerebral haemorrhage
Frederik Bloch Münster	C Conservatives	Niels Flemming Hansen	26 June 2024	Resigned due to new job as member of the European Parliament
Carl Andersen	I Liberal Alliance	Henrik Dahl	15 July 2024	Resigned due to new job as member of the European Parliament
