= West Jutland (Folketing constituency) =

Constituency of the Folketing, the national legislature of Denmark

- Vestjylland
- Constituency for the Folketing
- Location of West Jutland within Denmark
- Municipality: List: Herning; Holstebro; Ikast-Brande; Lemvig; Ringkøbing-Skjern; Silkeborg; Skive; Struer; Viborg
- Region: Central Denmark
- Population: 532,029 (2026)
- Electorate: 387,293 (2026)
- Area: 8,020 km^{2} (2022)

Current constituency
- Created: 2007
- Seats: List: 13 (2011–present); 14 (2007–2011)
- Members of the Folketing: List: Carsten Bach (I); Lise Bertelsen (C); Thomas Danielsen (V); Dennis Flydtkjær (Æ); Mads Fuglede (V); Søren Gade (V); Mogens Jensen (A); Thomas Jensen (A); Betina Kastbjerg (Æ); Annette Lind (A); Signe Munk (F); Anne Paulin (A); Søren Pape Poulsen (C); Jeppe Søe (M)
- Created from: Aarhus County; Ringkjøbing County; Vejle County; Viborg County

West Jutland (Danish: Vestjylland) is one of the 12 multi-member constituencies of the Folketing, the national legislature of Denmark. The constituency was established in 2007 following the public administration structural reform. It consists of the municipalities of Herning, Holstebro, Ikast-Brande, Lemvig, Ringkøbing-Skjern, Silkeborg, Skive, Struer and Viborg. The constituency currently elects 13 of the 179 members of the Folketing using the open party-list proportional representation electoral system. At the 2026 general election it had 387,293 registered electors.

== Electoral system ==
West Jutland currently elects 13 of the 179 members of the Folketing using the open party-list proportional representation electoral system. Constituency seats are allocated using the D'Hondt method. Compensatory seats are calculated based on the national vote and are allocated using the Sainte-Laguë method, initially at the provincial level and finally at the constituency level. Only parties that reach any one of three thresholds stipulated by section 77 of the Folketing (Parliamentary) Elections Act - winning at least one constituency seat; obtaining at least the Hare quota (valid votes in province/number of constituency seats in province) in two of the three provinces; or obtaining at least 2% of the national vote - compete for compensatory seats.

== Election results ==
=== Summary ===
Election	Red–Green Ø			Green Left F			Alternative Å			Social Democrats A			Social Liberals B			Venstre V			Conservative People's C			Liberal Alliance I / Y			Danish People's O		
Election	Votes	%	Seats	Votes	%	Seats	Votes	%	Seats	Votes	%	Seats	Votes	%	Seats	Votes	%	Seats	Votes	%	Seats	Votes	%	Seats	Votes	%	Seats
2026	8,292	2.56%	0	32,281	9.96%	1	3,592	1.11%	0	66,800	20.61%	3	9,971	3.08%	0	51,884	16.01%	3	25,914	8.00%	1	32,770	10.11%	1	24,309	7.50%	1
2022	7,366	2.27%	0	20,715	6.38%	1	4,731	1.46%	0	82,187	25.33%	4	6,100	1.88%	0	62,981	19.41%	3	26,395	8.13%	1	25,235	7.78%	1	6,514	2.01%	0
2019	11,091	3.42%	0	20,151	6.22%	1	5,503	1.70%	0	79,550	24.55%	4	17,216	5.31%	1	96,659	29.83%	5	29,934	9.24%	1	7,206	2.22%	0	27,229	8.40%	1
2015	14,531	4.45%	0	11,720	3.59%	0	8,642	2.65%	0	80,122	24.54%	4	9,183	2.81%	0	89,537	27.43%	5	15,928	4.88%	0	19,377	5.94%	1	69,657	21.34%	3
2011	11,505	3.48%	0	26,819	8.10%	1				76,208	23.02%	4	24,090	7.28%	1	113,443	34.27%	5	12,677	3.83%	0	16,061	4.85%	0	40,378	12.20%	2
2007	2,677	0.82%	0	30,642	9.42%	1				74,664	22.95%	4	12,776	3.93%	0	121,292	37.28%	6	24,917	7.66%	1	6,725	2.07%	0	42,357	13.02%	2

(Excludes compensatory seats)

=== Detailed ===
==== 2026 ====
Results of the 2026 general election held on 24 March 2026:

Party		Votes per nomination district											Total Votes	%	Seats		
Party		Herning North	Herning South	Holste- bro	Ikast	Ringkø- bing	Silke- borg North	Silke- borg South	Skive	Struer	Viborg East	Viborg West	Total Votes	%	Con.	Com.	Tot.
Social Democrats	A	5,186	4,730	7,766	4,741	5,503	6,300	7,420	7,006	5,220	5,810	7,118	66,800	20.61%	3	0	3
Venstre	V	5,775	4,295	7,241	3,583	3,873	6,659	3,581	3,811	6,475	3,377	3,214	51,884	16.01%	3	0	3
Denmark Democrats	Æ	4,086	2,845	4,016	3,116	7,328	3,006	1,635	4,851	3,290	3,593	3,318	41,084	12.68%	2	0	2
Liberal Alliance	I	3,173	3,096	3,812	2,674	2,924	2,443	3,650	2,242	1,976	1,858	3,059	32,770	10.11%	1	1	2
Green Left	F	2,409	2,119	3,980	1,657	2,418	2,236	4,392	3,119	2,349	2,777	3,658	32,281	9.96%	1	0	1
Conservative People's Party	C	2,205	1,782	1,834	2,372	2,399	2,169	2,861	1,604	935	3,854	4,024	25,914	8.00%	1	0	1
Danish People's Party	O	2,125	1,990	3,057	2,680	2,024	2,315	2,175	1,961	1,732	2,061	2,189	24,309	7.50%	1	0	1
Moderates	M	1,637	1,586	1,606	1,307	1,598	2,194	2,936	1,391	902	1,564	1,669	18,390	5.67%	1	0	1
Danish Social Liberal Party	B	878	1,004	1,037	552	584	1,282	1,866	512	615	699	942	9,971	3.08%	0	1	1
Citizens' Party	H	781	586	850	834	877	880	640	768	692	824	807	8,539	2.63%	0	0	0
Red–Green Alliance	Ø	543	821	740	492	443	985	1,543	607	407	630	1,097	8,292	2.56%	0	1	1
The Alternative	Å	207	228	316	215	217	470	592	222	207	368	550	3,592	1.11%	0	0	0
Knud Gaarn-Larsen (Independent)		29	17	25	13	23	18	9	9	13	38	70	264	0.08%	0	0	0
Valid votes		29,034	25,002	36,361	24,236	32,997	30,686	33,300	27,693	24,813	28,253	31,715	324,090	100.00%	13	3	16
Blank votes		362	313	397	297	393	353	368	371	221	317	386	3,778	1.15%			
Rejected votes – other		54	81	81	47	63	53	75	62	46	63	72	697	0.21%			
Total polled		29,450	25,396	36,839	24,580	33,453	31,092	33,743	28,126	25,080	28,633	32,173	328,565	84.84%			
Registered electors		34,036	30,761	43,466	29,454	39,462	35,574	39,183	33,818	29,418	33,325	38,796	387,293				
Turnout		86.53%	82.56%	84.75%	83.45%	84.77%	87.40%	86.12%	83.17%	85.25%	85.92%	82.93%	84.84%				

The following candidates were elected:

- Constituency seats - Carsten Bach (I), 2,315 votes; Lise Bertelsen (C), 6,290 votes; Morten E. G. Brautsch (M), 1,585 votes; Thomas Danielsen (V), 7,608 votes; Dennis Flydtkjær (Æ), 4,360 votes; Mads Fuglede (Æ), 5,806 votes; Søren Gade (V), 21,608 votes; Katrine Evelyn Jensen (A), 4,721 votes; Mogens Jensen (A), 7,010 votes; Trine Jepsen (V), 6,892 votes; Signe Munk (F), 13,806 votes; Søren Boel Olesen (O), 2,446 votes; and Anne Paulin (A), 6,742 votes.
- Compensatory seats - Thorbjørn Jacobsen (I), 1,836 votes; Lisbeth Torfing (Ø), 2,521 votes; and Philip Vivet (B), 1,443 votes.

==== 2022 ====
Results of the 2022 general election held on 1 November 2022:

Party		Votes per nomination district											Total Votes	%	Seats		
Party		Herning North	Herning South	Holste- bro	Ikast	Ringkø- bing	Silke- borg North	Silke- borg South	Skive	Struer	Viborg East	Viborg West	Total Votes	%	Con.	Com.	Tot.
Social Democrats	A	6,384	5,842	9,740	5,747	7,095	7,375	8,572	8,868	7,085	6,991	8,488	82,187	25.33%	4	0	4
Venstre	V	6,709	5,014	8,916	4,795	8,492	5,268	5,207	3,952	5,862	4,517	4,249	62,981	19.41%	3	0	3
Denmark Democrats	Æ	4,485	3,132	4,497	4,065	5,681	3,119	2,093	6,142	3,957	3,489	3,426	44,086	13.59%	2	0	2
Conservative People's Party	C	1,890	1,700	1,884	1,744	2,140	2,169	2,366	1,604	1,456	4,631	4,811	26,395	8.13%	1	1	2
Liberal Alliance	I	2,498	2,674	2,990	1,934	2,404	2,443	2,890	1,802	1,681	1,858	2,061	25,235	7.78%	1	0	1
Moderates	M	2,132	2,100	1,884	1,806	2,178	2,588	3,235	1,489	1,292	1,475	1,829	22,008	6.78%	1	0	1
Green Left	F	1,506	1,353	2,399	1,069	1,578	2,236	2,825	1,783	1,533	1,800	2,633	20,715	6.38%	1	0	1
The New Right	D	854	754	940	957	1,205	1,056	759	838	820	938	926	10,047	3.10%	0	0	0
Red–Green Alliance	Ø	435	577	740	416	452	915	1,453	516	414	541	907	7,366	2.27%	0	0	0
Danish People's Party	O	550	548	783	649	615	560	577	579	587	520	546	6,514	2.01%	0	0	0
Danish Social Liberal Party	B	452	527	624	371	385	737	1,128	378	447	467	584	6,100	1.88%	0	0	0
Christian Democrats	K	818	468	446	363	1,421	374	178	199	324	246	158	4,995	1.54%	0	0	0
The Alternative	Å	290	320	387	303	320	648	791	284	264	486	638	4,731	1.46%	0	0	0
Independent Greens	Q	103	112	119	63	40	47	104	59	43	33	44	767	0.24%	0	0	0
Karen Predbjørn Klarbæk (Independent)		30	29	35	22	27	60	60	25	22	34	27	371	0.11%	0	0	0
Valid votes		29,136	25,150	36,384	24,304	34,033	29,595	32,238	28,518	25,787	28,026	31,327	324,498	100.00%	13	1	14
Blank votes		352	368	406	312	406	389	395	413	266	346	398	4,051	1.23%			
Rejected votes – other		72	106	106	98	127	70	71	77	77	80	128	1,012	0.31%			
Total polled		29,560	25,624	36,896	24,714	34,566	30,054	32,704	29,008	26,130	28,452	31,853	329,561	85.48%			
Registered electors		33,824	30,871	43,147	29,364	40,312	34,230	37,895	34,512	30,360	32,889	38,124	385,528				
Turnout		87.39%	83.00%	85.51%	84.16%	85.75%	87.80%	86.30%	84.05%	86.07%	86.51%	83.55%	85.48%				

Votes per municipality:

Party		Votes per municipality									Total Votes
Party		Herning	Holste- bro	Ikast- Brande	Lemvig	Ringkø- bing- Skjern	Silke- borg	Skive	Struer	Viborg	Total Votes
Social Democrats	A	12,226	9,740	5,747	3,063	7,095	15,947	8,868	4,022	15,479	82,187
Venstre	V	11,723	8,916	4,795	3,182	8,492	10,475	3,952	2,680	8,766	62,981
Denmark Democrats	Æ	7,617	4,497	4,065	2,092	5,681	5,212	6,142	1,865	6,915	44,086
Conservative People's Party	C	3,590	1,884	1,744	712	2,140	4,535	1,604	744	9,442	26,395
Liberal Alliance	I	5,172	2,990	1,934	761	2,404	5,333	1,802	920	3,919	25,235
Moderates	M	4,232	1,884	1,806	591	2,178	5,823	1,489	701	3,304	22,008
Green Left	F	2,859	2,399	1,069	677	1,578	5,061	1,783	856	4,433	20,715
The New Right	D	1,608	940	957	444	1,205	1,815	838	376	1,864	10,047
Red–Green Alliance	Ø	1,012	740	416	174	452	2,368	516	240	1,448	7,366
Danish People's Party	O	1,098	783	649	286	615	1,137	579	301	1,066	6,514
Danish Social Liberal Party	B	979	624	371	255	385	1,865	378	192	1,051	6,100
Christian Democrats	K	1,286	446	363	169	1,421	552	199	155	404	4,995
The Alternative	Å	610	387	303	133	320	1,439	284	131	1,124	4,731
Independent Greens	Q	215	119	63	11	40	151	59	32	77	767
Karen Predbjørn Klarbæk (Independent)		59	35	22	13	27	120	25	9	61	371
Valid votes		54,286	36,384	24,304	12,563	34,033	61,833	28,518	13,224	59,353	324,498
Blank votes		720	406	312	116	406	784	413	150	744	4,051
Rejected votes – other		178	106	98	42	127	141	77	35	208	1,012
Total polled		55,184	36,896	24,714	12,721	34,566	62,758	29,008	13,409	60,305	329,561
Registered electors		64,695	43,147	29,364	14,679	40,312	72,125	34,512	15,681	71,013	385,528
Turnout		85.30%	85.51%	84.16%	86.66%	85.75%	87.01%	84.05%	85.51%	84.92%	85.48%

The following candidates were elected:

- Constituency seats - Carsten Bach (I), 2,103 votes; Thomas Danielsen (V), 8,923 votes; Dennis Flydtkjær (Æ), 7,501 votes; Mads Fuglede (V), 8,428 votes; Søren Gade (V), 22,813 votes; Mogens Jensen (A), 6,413 votes; Thomas Jensen (A), 5,803 votes; Betina Kastbjerg (Æ), 2,037 votes; Annette Lind (A), 9,797 votes; Signe Munk (F), 8,032 votes; Anne Paulin (A), 6,905 votes; Søren Pape Poulsen (C), 15,767 votes; and Jeppe Søe (M), 2,452 votes.
- Compensatory seats - Lise Bertelsen (C), 1,894 votes.

==== 2019 ====
Results of the 2019 general election held on 5 June 2019:

Party		Votes per nomination district											Total Votes	%	Seats		
Party		Herning North	Herning South	Holste- bro	Ikast	Ringkø- bing	Silke- borg North	Silke- borg South	Skive	Struer	Viborg East	Viborg West	Total Votes	%	Con.	Com.	Tot.
Venstre	V	10,049	8,217	11,251	8,560	10,858	7,927	7,407	9,555	8,330	7,197	7,308	96,659	29.83%	5	0	5
Social Democrats	A	5,937	5,776	10,196	5,428	6,668	6,783	7,882	8,879	7,018	6,727	8,256	79,550	24.55%	4	0	4
Conservative People's Party	C	2,456	2,163	2,427	1,683	2,063	2,506	2,803	1,728	2,165	4,844	5,096	29,934	9.24%	1	1	2
Danish People's Party	O	2,407	2,002	2,945	3,015	3,383	2,403	2,104	2,261	2,240	2,240	2,229	27,229	8.40%	1	0	1
Socialist People's Party	F	1,372	1,381	2,447	1,099	1,586	1,956	2,472	1,681	1,576	1,848	2,733	20,151	6.22%	1	0	1
Danish Social Liberal Party	B	1,424	1,703	1,836	945	1,207	1,705	2,403	1,826	1,198	1,284	1,685	17,216	5.31%	1	0	1
Christian Democrats	K	2,409	1,396	1,623	1,045	5,624	1,205	636	508	1,169	827	574	17,016	5.25%	0	0	0
Red–Green Alliance	Ø	707	814	1,259	665	758	1,275	1,833	971	733	808	1,268	11,091	3.42%	0	1	1
Liberal Alliance	I	703	934	907	543	619	627	812	442	471	543	605	7,206	2.22%	0	1	1
The Alternative	Å	339	488	512	336	396	710	935	328	328	447	684	5,503	1.70%	0	0	0
The New Right	D	525	478	563	502	536	562	490	533	424	406	445	5,464	1.69%	0	0	0
Hard Line	P	402	443	541	450	477	449	451	565	423	353	503	5,057	1.56%	0	0	0
Klaus Riskær Pedersen	E	167	168	197	165	167	224	225	148	143	140	186	1,930	0.60%	0	0	0
Valid votes		28,897	25,963	36,704	24,436	34,342	28,332	30,453	29,425	26,218	27,664	31,572	324,006	100.00%	13	3	16
Blank votes		196	219	262	215	236	229	232	253	183	179	297	2,501	0.76%			
Rejected votes – other		44	49	74	87	66	62	78	65	89	104	103	821	0.25%			
Total polled		29,137	26,231	37,040	24,738	34,644	28,623	30,763	29,743	26,490	27,947	31,972	327,328	85.38%			
Registered electors		33,223	31,127	43,102	29,300	40,918	32,734	35,685	35,316	31,245	32,553	38,164	383,367				
Turnout		87.70%	84.27%	85.94%	84.43%	84.67%	87.44%	86.21%	84.22%	84.78%	85.85%	83.78%	85.38%				

Votes per municipality:

Party		Votes per municipality									Total Votes
Party		Herning	Holste- bro	Ikast- Brande	Lemvig	Ringkø- bing- Skjern	Silke- borg	Skive	Struer	Viborg	Total Votes
Venstre	V	18,266	11,251	8,560	4,404	10,858	15,334	9,555	3,926	14,505	96,659
Social Democrats	A	11,713	10,196	5,428	2,978	6,668	14,665	8,879	4,040	14,983	79,550
Conservative People's Party	C	4,619	2,427	1,683	1,212	2,063	5,309	1,728	953	9,940	29,934
Danish People's Party	O	4,409	2,945	3,015	1,108	3,383	4,507	2,261	1,132	4,469	27,229
Socialist People's Party	F	2,753	2,447	1,099	745	1,586	4,428	1,681	831	4,581	20,151
Danish Social Liberal Party	B	3,127	1,836	945	609	1,207	4,108	1,826	589	2,969	17,216
Christian Democrats	K	3,805	1,623	1,045	623	5,624	1,841	508	546	1,401	17,016
Red–Green Alliance	Ø	1,521	1,259	665	315	758	3,108	971	418	2,076	11,091
Liberal Alliance	I	1,637	907	543	205	619	1,439	442	266	1,148	7,206
The Alternative	Å	827	512	336	147	396	1,645	328	181	1,131	5,503
The New Right	D	1,003	563	502	196	536	1,052	533	228	851	5,464
Hard Line	P	845	541	450	213	477	900	565	210	856	5,057
Klaus Riskær Pedersen	E	335	197	165	63	167	449	148	80	326	1,930
Valid votes		54,860	36,704	24,436	12,818	34,342	58,785	29,425	13,400	59,236	324,006
Blank votes		415	262	215	84	236	461	253	99	476	2,501
Rejected votes – other		93	74	87	47	66	140	65	42	207	821
Total polled		55,368	37,040	24,738	12,949	34,644	59,386	29,743	13,541	59,919	327,328
Registered electors		64,350	43,102	29,300	15,266	40,918	68,419	35,316	15,979	70,717	383,367
Turnout		86.04%	85.94%	84.43%	84.82%	84.67%	86.80%	84.22%	84.74%	84.73%	85.38%

The following candidates were elected:

- Constituency seats - Thomas Danielsen (V), 11,121 votes; Dennis Flydtkjær (O), 4,622 votes; Kristian Jensen (V), 14,302 votes; Mogens Jensen (A), 13,525 votes; Thomas Jensen (A), 12,800 votes; Carsten Kissmeyer (V), 9,359 votes; Annette Lind (A), 21,250 votes; Kristian Pihl Lorentzen (V), 9,751 votes; Signe Munk (F), 6,285 votes; Anne Paulin (A), 11,435 votes; Søren Pape Poulsen (C), 25,062 votes; Andreas Steenberg (B), 4,444 votes; and Inger Støjberg (V), 37,285 votes.
- Compensatory seats - Orla Østerby (C), 1,239 votes; Jakob Sølvhøj (Ø), 3,645 votes; and Alex Vanopslagh (I), 3,337 votes.

==== 2015 ====
Results of the 2015 general election held on 18 June 2015:

Party		Votes per nomination district											Total Votes	%	Seats		
Party		Herning North	Herning South	Holste- bro	Ikast	Ringkø- bing	Silke- borg North	Silke- borg South	Skive	Struer	Viborg East	Viborg West	Total Votes	%	Con.	Com.	Tot.
Venstre	V	9,256	7,553	9,642	7,438	12,330	6,909	6,176	8,106	7,878	7,042	7,207	89,537	27.43%	5	0	5
Social Democrats	A	5,670	5,663	10,762	5,403	6,830	6,656	8,006	9,164	7,147	6,453	8,368	80,122	24.54%	4	0	4
Danish People's Party	O	6,518	5,859	7,563	6,871	7,985	5,855	5,311	6,245	5,909	5,452	6,089	69,657	21.34%	3	0	3
Liberal Alliance	I	1,844	2,004	2,107	1,359	1,628	1,872	2,483	1,472	1,184	1,565	1,859	19,377	5.94%	1	0	1
Conservative People's Party	C	998	929	1,281	852	1,085	1,272	1,282	893	1,317	3,293	2,726	15,928	4.88%	0	1	1
Red–Green Alliance	Ø	956	1,153	1,496	930	1,118	1,421	2,018	1,531	1,104	1,106	1,698	14,531	4.45%	0	1	1
Socialist People's Party	F	797	879	1,296	600	1,006	1,044	1,384	864	1,218	1,060	1,572	11,720	3.59%	0	0	0
Danish Social Liberal Party	B	786	775	1,017	515	681	881	1,269	922	571	792	974	9,183	2.81%	0	1	1
The Alternative	Å	513	590	799	505	596	1,085	1,544	644	618	716	1,032	8,642	2.65%	0	1	1
Christian Democrats	K	1,242	746	720	518	2,309	533	264	242	455	354	263	7,646	2.34%	0	0	0
Erik Sputnik (Independent)		9	8	44	11	0	5	4	9	11	10	5	116	0.04%	0	0	0
Valid votes		28,589	26,159	36,727	25,002	35,568	27,533	29,741	30,092	27,412	27,843	31,793	326,459	100.00%	13	4	17
Blank votes		204	238	349	209	259	229	229	281	210	180	287	2,675	0.81%			
Rejected votes – other		55	98	98	70	92	79	81	64	78	75	126	916	0.28%			
Total polled		28,848	26,495	37,174	25,281	35,919	27,841	30,051	30,437	27,700	28,098	32,206	330,050	86.94%			
Registered electors		32,272	30,871	42,640	29,178	41,433	31,446	34,413	35,619	31,775	32,168	37,816	379,631				
Turnout		89.39%	85.82%	87.18%	86.64%	86.69%	88.54%	87.32%	85.45%	87.18%	87.35%	85.17%	86.94%				

Votes per municipality:

Party		Votes per municipality									Total Votes
Party		Herning	Holste- bro	Ikast- Brande	Lemvig	Ringkø- bing- Skjern	Silke- borg	Skive	Struer	Viborg	Total Votes
Venstre	V	16,809	9,642	7,438	4,247	12,330	13,085	8,106	3,631	14,249	89,537
Social Democrats	A	11,333	10,762	5,403	3,173	6,830	14,662	9,164	3,974	14,821	80,122
Danish People's Party	O	12,377	7,563	6,871	2,889	7,985	11,166	6,245	3,020	11,541	69,657
Liberal Alliance	I	3,848	2,107	1,359	575	1,628	4,355	1,472	609	3,424	19,377
Conservative People's Party	C	1,927	1,281	852	733	1,085	2,554	893	584	6,019	15,928
Red–Green Alliance	Ø	2,109	1,496	930	434	1,118	3,439	1,531	670	2,804	14,531
Socialist People's Party	F	1,676	1,296	600	600	1,006	2,428	864	618	2,632	11,720
Danish Social Liberal Party	B	1,561	1,017	515	288	681	2,150	922	283	1,766	9,183
The Alternative	Å	1,103	799	505	297	596	2,629	644	321	1,748	8,642
Christian Democrats	K	1,988	720	518	278	2,309	797	242	177	617	7,646
Erik Sputnik (Independent)		17	44	11	4	0	9	9	7	13	114
Valid votes		54,748	36,727	25,002	13,518	35,568	57,274	30,092	13,894	59,634	326,457
Blank votes		442	349	209	89	259	458	281	121	467	2,675
Rejected votes – other		153	98	70	47	92	160	64	31	203	918
Total polled		55,343	37,174	25,281	13,654	35,919	57,892	30,437	14,046	60,304	330,050
Registered electors		63,143	42,640	29,178	15,664	41,433	65,859	35,619	16,111	69,984	379,631
Turnout		87.65%	87.18%	86.64%	87.17%	86.69%	87.90%	85.45%	87.18%	86.17%	86.94%

The following candidates were elected:

- Constituency seats - Thomas Danielsen (V), 10,850 votes; Karina Due (O), 8,096 votes; Dennis Flydtkjær (O), 20,768 votes; Karin Gaardsted (A), 11,377 votes; Kristian Jensen (V), 17,728 votes; Mogens Jensen (A), 14,667 votes; Thomas Jensen (A), 13,462 votes; Christian Langballe (O), 10,779 votes; Esben Lunde Larsen (V), 12,831 votes; Annette Lind (A), 20,804 votes; Kristian Pihl Lorentzen (V), 10,142 votes; Leif Mikkelsen (I), 10,477 votes; and Inger Støjberg (V), 20,380 votes.
- Compensatory seats - René Gade (Å), 4,065 votes; Søren Pape (C), 13,231 votes; Jakob Sølvhøj (Ø), 3,674 votes; and Andreas Steenberg (B), 4,061 votes.

==== 2011 ====
Results of the 2011 general election held on 15 September 2011:

Party		Votes per nomination district											Total Votes	%	Seats		
Party		Herning North	Herning South	Holste- bro	Ikast	Ringkø- bing	Silke- borg North	Silke- borg South	Skive	Struer	Viborg East	Viborg West	Total Votes	%	Con.	Com.	Tot.
Venstre	V	11,951	9,707	10,991	9,213	15,143	9,074	8,421	9,701	8,470	10,465	10,307	113,443	34.27%	5	1	6
Social Democrats	A	5,146	5,740	8,977	5,463	6,406	6,499	7,577	9,064	6,958	6,275	8,103	76,208	23.02%	4	0	4
Danish People's Party	O	3,502	3,170	4,105	4,072	4,900	3,328	3,011	3,856	3,536	3,297	3,601	40,378	12.20%	2	0	2
Socialist People's Party	F	1,647	1,841	3,250	1,510	2,622	2,238	2,802	2,696	2,975	2,141	3,097	26,819	8.10%	1	0	1
Danish Social Liberal Party	B	1,988	1,913	2,516	1,525	2,081	2,238	2,906	2,281	1,770	2,288	2,584	24,090	7.28%	1	0	1
Liberal Alliance	I	1,418	1,297	1,975	1,175	1,592	1,517	1,729	1,322	1,306	1,342	1,388	16,061	4.85%	0	1	1
Conservative People's Party	C	1,226	1,220	1,405	1,199	1,226	1,168	1,413	803	934	998	1,085	12,677	3.83%	0	0	0
Red–Green Alliance	Ø	696	814	1,302	687	837	1,187	1,734	1,168	833	940	1,307	11,505	3.48%	0	1	1
Christian Democrats	K	1,006	501	2,510	437	1,883	459	218	259	1,765	358	268	9,664	2.92%	0	0	0
Rikke Cramer Christiansen (Independent)		7	8	16	13	13	15	3	7	4	13	37	136	0.04%	0	0	0
Ejgil Kølbæk (Independent)		7	1	3	3	3	1	1	0	1	2	2	24	0.01%	0	0	0
Valid votes		28,594	26,212	37,050	25,297	36,706	27,724	29,815	31,157	28,552	28,119	31,779	331,005	100.00%	13	3	16
Blank votes		165	165	249	187	231	183	170	250	167	183	239	2,189	0.66%			
Rejected votes – other		78	76	99	76	66	74	84	73	85	90	111	912	0.27%			
Total polled		28,837	26,453	37,398	25,560	37,003	27,981	30,069	31,480	28,804	28,392	32,129	334,106	88.45%			
Registered electors		31,880	30,411	42,174	29,073	41,797	31,136	33,786	36,009	32,597	32,008	36,877	377,748				
Turnout		90.45%	86.98%	88.68%	87.92%	88.53%	89.87%	89.00%	87.42%	88.36%	88.70%	87.12%	88.45%				

Votes per municipality:

Party		Votes per municipality									Total Votes
Party		Herning	Holste- bro	Ikast- Brande	Lemvig	Ringkø- bing- Skjern	Silke- borg	Skive	Struer	Viborg	Total Votes
Venstre	V	21,658	10,991	9,213	4,365	15,143	17,495	9,701	4,105	20,772	113,443
Social Democrats	A	10,886	8,977	5,463	2,833	6,406	14,076	9,064	4,125	14,378	76,208
Danish People's Party	O	6,672	4,105	4,072	1,893	4,900	6,339	3,856	1,643	6,898	40,378
Socialist People's Party	F	3,488	3,250	1,510	1,548	2,622	5,040	2,696	1,427	5,238	26,819
Danish Social Liberal Party	B	3,901	2,516	1,525	883	2,081	5,144	2,281	887	4,872	24,090
Liberal Alliance	I	2,715	1,975	1,175	695	1,592	3,246	1,322	611	2,730	16,061
Conservative People's Party	C	2,446	1,405	1,199	434	1,226	2,581	803	500	2,083	12,677
Red–Green Alliance	Ø	1,510	1,302	687	389	837	2,921	1,168	444	2,247	11,505
Christian Democrats	K	1,507	2,510	437	961	1,883	677	259	804	626	9,664
Rikke Cramer Christiansen (Independent)		15	16	13	1	13	18	7	3	50	136
Ejgil Kølbæk (Independent)		8	3	3	1	3	2	0	0	4	24
Valid votes		54,806	37,050	25,297	14,003	36,706	57,539	31,157	14,549	59,898	331,005
Blank votes		330	249	187	82	231	353	250	85	422	2,189
Rejected votes – other		154	99	76	46	66	158	73	39	201	912
Total polled		55,290	37,398	25,560	14,131	37,003	58,050	31,480	14,673	60,521	334,106
Registered electors		62,291	42,174	29,073	16,119	41,797	64,922	36,009	16,478	68,885	377,748
Turnout		88.76%	88.68%	87.92%	87.67%	88.53%	89.41%	87.42%	89.05%	87.86%	88.45%

The following candidates were elected:

- Constituency seats - Dennis Flydtkjær (O), 8,591 votes; Karin Gaardsted (A), 11,495 votes; Steen Gade (F), 6,421 votes; Kristian Jensen (V), 24,082 votes; Mogens Jensen (A), 11,646 votes; Thomas Jensen (A), 12,991 votes; Christian Langballe (O), 6,229 votes; Esben Lunde Larsen (V), 13,127 votes; Annette Lind (A), 9,668 votes; Kristian Pihl Lorentzen (V), 14,264 votes; Mads Rørvig (V), 13,387 votes; Andreas Steenberg (B), 6,499 votes; and Inger Støjberg (V), 23,066 votes.
- Compensatory seats - Thomas Danielsen (V), 7,814 votes; Lars Dohn (Ø), 972 votes; and Leif Mikkelsen (I), 9,037 votes.

==== 2007 ====
Results of the 2007 general election held on 13 November 2007:

Party		Votes per nomination district											Total Votes	%	Seats		
Party		Herning North	Herning South	Holste- bro	Ikast	Ringkø- bing	Silke- borg North	Silke- borg South	Skive	Struer	Viborg East	Viborg West	Total Votes	%	Con.	Com.	Tot.
Venstre	V	12,527	10,104	14,553	9,459	15,089	8,947	7,395	10,883	10,842	10,811	10,682	121,292	37.28%	6	0	6
Social Democrats	A	4,892	5,482	8,906	4,943	6,254	6,402	8,011	8,721	6,444	6,283	8,326	74,664	22.95%	4	0	4
Danish People's Party	O	3,589	3,574	4,122	4,292	4,939	3,618	3,234	4,078	3,576	3,482	3,853	42,357	13.02%	2	0	2
Socialist People's Party	F	1,723	2,132	3,749	1,739	2,858	2,523	3,586	3,120	3,734	2,295	3,183	30,642	9.42%	1	1	2
Conservative People's Party	C	1,967	1,876	1,992	2,082	2,789	2,585	3,586	1,660	1,884	2,299	2,197	24,917	7.66%	1	0	1
Danish Social Liberal Party	B	1,043	1,165	1,390	756	1,222	1,055	1,301	1,431	969	1,139	1,305	12,776	3.93%	0	1	1
Christian Democrats	K	1,310	907	972	934	2,363	594	276	311	678	514	341	9,200	2.83%	0	0	0
New Alliance	Y	480	442	565	420	683	887	1,111	443	457	586	651	6,725	2.07%	0	0	0
Unity List	Ø	156	182	284	142	190	267	530	262	190	187	287	2,677	0.82%	0	0	0
Ejgil Kølbæk (Independent)		17	5	9	9	8	2	3	2	8	4	6	73	0.02%	0	0	0
Valid votes		27,704	25,869	36,542	24,776	36,395	26,880	29,033	30,911	28,782	27,600	30,831	325,323	100.00%	14	2	16
Blank votes		116	117	161	151	182	138	130	163	127	152	153	1,590	0.49%			
Rejected votes – other		51	62	59	55	56	41	81	69	66	74	82	696	0.21%			
Total polled		27,871	26,048	36,762	24,982	36,633	27,059	29,244	31,143	28,975	27,826	31,066	327,609	87.34%			
Registered electors		30,986	30,360	42,029	28,748	42,002	30,437	33,302	36,155	33,170	31,716	36,182	375,087				
Turnout		89.95%	85.80%	87.47%	86.90%	87.22%	88.90%	87.81%	86.14%	87.35%	87.73%	85.86%	87.34%				

Votes per municipality:

Party		Votes per municipality									Total Votes
Party		Herning	Holste- bro	Ikast- Brande	Lemvig	Ringkø- bing- Skjern	Silke- borg	Skive	Struer	Viborg	Total Votes
Venstre	V	22,631	14,553	9,459	5,621	15,089	16,342	10,883	5,221	21,493	121,292
Social Democrats	A	10,374	8,906	4,943	2,735	6,254	14,413	8,721	3,709	14,609	74,664
Danish People's Party	O	7,163	4,122	4,292	1,875	4,939	6,852	4,078	1,701	7,335	42,357
Socialist People's Party	F	3,855	3,749	1,739	1,866	2,858	6,109	3,120	1,868	5,478	30,642
Conservative People's Party	C	3,843	1,992	2,082	895	2,789	6,171	1,660	989	4,496	24,917
Danish Social Liberal Party	B	2,208	1,390	756	504	1,222	2,356	1,431	465	2,444	12,776
Christian Democrats	K	2,217	972	934	386	2,363	870	311	292	855	9,200
New Alliance	Y	922	565	420	204	683	1,998	443	253	1,237	6,725
Unity List	Ø	338	284	142	90	190	797	262	100	474	2,677
Ejgil Kølbæk (Independent)		22	9	9	5	8	5	2	3	10	73
Valid votes		53,573	36,542	24,776	14,181	36,395	55,913	30,911	14,601	58,431	325,323
Blank votes		233	161	151	61	182	268	163	66	305	1,590
Rejected votes – other		113	59	55	33	56	122	69	33	156	696
Total polled		53,919	36,762	24,982	14,275	36,633	56,303	31,143	14,700	58,892	327,609
Registered electors		61,346	42,029	28,748	16,394	42,002	63,739	36,155	16,776	67,898	375,087
Turnout		87.89%	87.47%	86.90%	87.07%	87.22%	88.33%	86.14%	87.63%	86.74%	87.34%

The following candidates were elected:

- Constituency seats - Søren Gade (V), 32,219 votes; Steen Gade (F), 10,212 votes; Christian Hansen (O), 17,338 votes; Kristian Jensen (V), 24,963 votes; Mogens Jensen (A), 10,421 votes; Thomas Jensen (A), 12,288 votes; Per Ørum Jørgensen (C), 5,219 votes; Jens Kirk (V), 9,354 votes; Jesper Langballe (O), 8,430 votes; Kristian Pihl Lorentzen (V), 11,500 votes; Jens Christian Lund (A), 15,443 votes; Helge Sander (V), 9,989 votes; Inger Støjberg (V), 17,654 votes; and Jens Peter Vernersen (A), 8,894 votes.
- Compensatory seats - Johannes Poulsen (B), 5,620 votes; and Kristen Touborg (F), 9,842 votes.
