= Karina Due =

Danish politician (born 1966)

Member of the Folketing
- In office 18 June 2015 – 5 June 2019
- Constituency: West Jutland

Personal details
- Born: 23 November 1966 (age 59) Herning, Denmark
- Party: Danish People's Party

Karina Friborg Due (born 23 November 1966 in Herning) is a Danish politician, who was a member of the Folketing for the Danish People's Party from 2015 to 2019.

== Political career ==
From 2010 to 2015 Due was a member of the municipal council of Silkeborg Municipality and has also been a member of the regional council of the Central Denmark Region. She was elected into parliament in the 2015 Danish general election. She ran again in the 2019 election, but was not reelected.
