= Minister of Transport (Denmark) =

Danish cabinet position

- Transportminister
- State coat of arms of the Kingdom of Denmark

- Incumbent; Karina Lorentzen since 27 October 2026
- Ministry of Transport
- Type: Minister
- Member of: Cabinet; State Council
- Reports to: the Prime minister
- Seat: Slotsholmen
- Appointer: The Monarch; (on the advice of the Prime Minister)
- Precursor: Minister of Public Works
- Formation: 9 November 1942; 83 years ago as Minister for Traffic
- First holder: Niels Elgaard
- Succession: depending on the order in the State Council
- Deputy: Permanent Secretary
- Salary: 1.624.503,02 DKK (€217,931), in 2026
- Website: Official website

The Minister of Transport (Danish: Transportminister) is the Danish minister responsible for the Ministry of Transport.

== List of ministers ==
No.	Portrait	Name (born-died)	Term of office			Political party	Government	Ref.
No.	Portrait	Name (born-died)	Took office	Left office	Time in office	Political party	Government	Ref.
Minister of Traffic (Trafikminister)
1		Niels Elgaard (1879–1963)	9 November 1942	29 August 1943	293 days	Venstre	Scavenius	
No Danish government (29 August 1943 (Note: On 29 August 1943, the Danish government resigned, refusing to grant further concessions to Nazi Germany. All government operations were assumed by the permanent secretaries of the individual departments, and this arrangement lasted until the Liberation of Denmark on 5 May 1945. Since King Christian X never accepted the resignation of the government, it existed de jure until a new cabinet was formed on 5 May 1945.) – 5 May 1945). Office is assumed by the permanent secretary.
2		Alfred Jensen (1903–1988)	5 May 1945	7 November 1945	186 days	Communist Party of Denmark	Buhl II	
None (task assumed by the Minister of Public Works); 7 November 1945 – 14 August 1986
3		Frode Nør Christensen (born 1948)	14 August 1986	3 June 1988	1 year, 294 days	Centre Democrats	Schlüter I–II	
4		Hans Peter Clausen (1928–1998)	3 June 1988	10 January 1989	221 days	Conservative People's Party	Schlüter III	
5		Knud Østergaard (1922–1993)	10 January 1989	18 December 1990	1 year, 342 days	Conservative People's Party	Schlüter III	
6		Kaj Ikast (1935–2020)	18 December 1990	25 January 1993	2 years, 38 days	Conservative People's Party	Schlüter IV	
7		Helge Mortensen (1941–2026)	25 January 1993	28 January 1994	1 year, 3 days	Social Democrats	P. N. Rasmussen I	
8		Jan Trøjborg (1955–2012)	28 January 1994	30 December 1996	2 years, 337 days	Social Democrats	P. N. Rasmussen I–II	
9		Bjørn Westh (born 1944)	30 December 1996	23 March 1998	1 year, 83 days	Social Democrats	P. N. Rasmussen III	
10		Sonja Mikkelsen (born 1955)	23 March 1998	23 February 2000	1 year, 337 days	Social Democrats	P. N. Rasmussen IV	
11		Jacob Buksti (1947–2016)	23 February 2000	27 November 2001	1 year, 277 days	Social Democrats	P. N. Rasmussen IV	
12		Flemming Hansen (1939–2021)	27 November 2001	18 February 2005	3 years, 83 days	Conservative People's Party	A. F. Rasmussen I	
Minister of Transport and Energy (Transport- og energiminister)
12		Flemming Hansen (1939–2021)	18 February 2005	12 September 2007	2 years, 206 days	Conservative People's Party	A. F. Rasmussen II	
13		Jakob Axel Nielsen (born 1967)	12 September 2007	23 November 2007	72 days	Conservative People's Party	A. F. Rasmussen II	
Minister of Transport (Transportminister)
14		Carina Christensen (born 1972)	23 November 2007	10 September 2008	292 days	Conservative People's Party	A. F. Rasmussen III	
15		Lars Barfoed (born 1957)	10 September 2008	23 February 2010	1 year, 166 days	Conservative People's Party	A. F. Rasmussen III; L. L. Rasmussen III	
16		Hans Christian Schmidt (born 1953)	23 February 2010	3 October 2011	1 year, 222 days	Venstre	L. L. Rasmussen I	
17		Henrik Dam Kristensen (born 1957)	3 October 2011	9 August 2013	1 year, 310 days	Social Democrats	Thorning-Schmidt I	
18		Pia Olsen Dyhr (born 1971)	9 August 2013	3 February 2014	178 days	Socialist People's Party	Thorning-Schmidt I	
19		Magnus Heunicke (born 1975)	3 February 2014	28 June 2015	1 year, 145 days	Social Democrats	Thorning-Schmidt II	
Minister of Transport and Construction (Transport- og bygningsminister)
16		Hans Christian Schmidt (born 1953)	28 June 2015	28 November 2016	1 year, 153 days	Venstre	L. L. Rasmussen II	
Minister of Transport, Construction and Housing (Transport-, bygnings- og boligminister)
20		Ole Birk Olesen (born 1972)	28 November 2016	27 June 2019	2 years, 211 days	Liberal Alliance	L. L. Rasmussen III	
Minister of Transport (Transportminister)
21		Benny Engelbrecht (born 1970)	27 June 2019	4 February 2022	2 years, 222 days	Social Democrats	Frederiksen I	
22		Trine Bramsen (born 1981)	4 February 2022	15 December 2022	314 days	Social Democrats	Frederiksen I	
23		Thomas Danielsen (born 1983)	15 December 2022	3 June 2026	3 years, 170 days	Venstre	Frederiksen II	
Minister of Cities, Rural Areas and Transport (By-, land- og transportminister)
24		Signe Munk (born 1990)	3 June 2026	27 October 2026	146 days	Green Left	Frederiksen III	
25		Karina Lorentzen (born 1973)	27 October 2026	Incumbent	2 days	Green Left	Frederiksen III	
