= Jakob Sølvhøj =

Danish politician

Member of the Folketing
- Incumbent
- Assumed office 18 June 2015
- Constituency: West Jutland

Personal details
- Born: 12 September 1954 (age 71) Helsingør, Denmark
- Party: Red–Green Alliance

Jakob Sølvhøj (born 12 September 1954 in Helsingør) is a Danish politician, who is a member of the Folketing for the Red–Green Alliance political party. He was elected at the 2015 Danish general election.

== Political career ==
Sølvhøj was first elected in the 2015 election, where he received 753 votes. Despite the relatively low vote count, this was enough to guarantee Sølvhøj one of the Red-Green Alliance's levelling seats. The same happened in 2019, where Sølvhøj received 913 votes.
