= Philip Vivet =

Danish politician (born 2000)

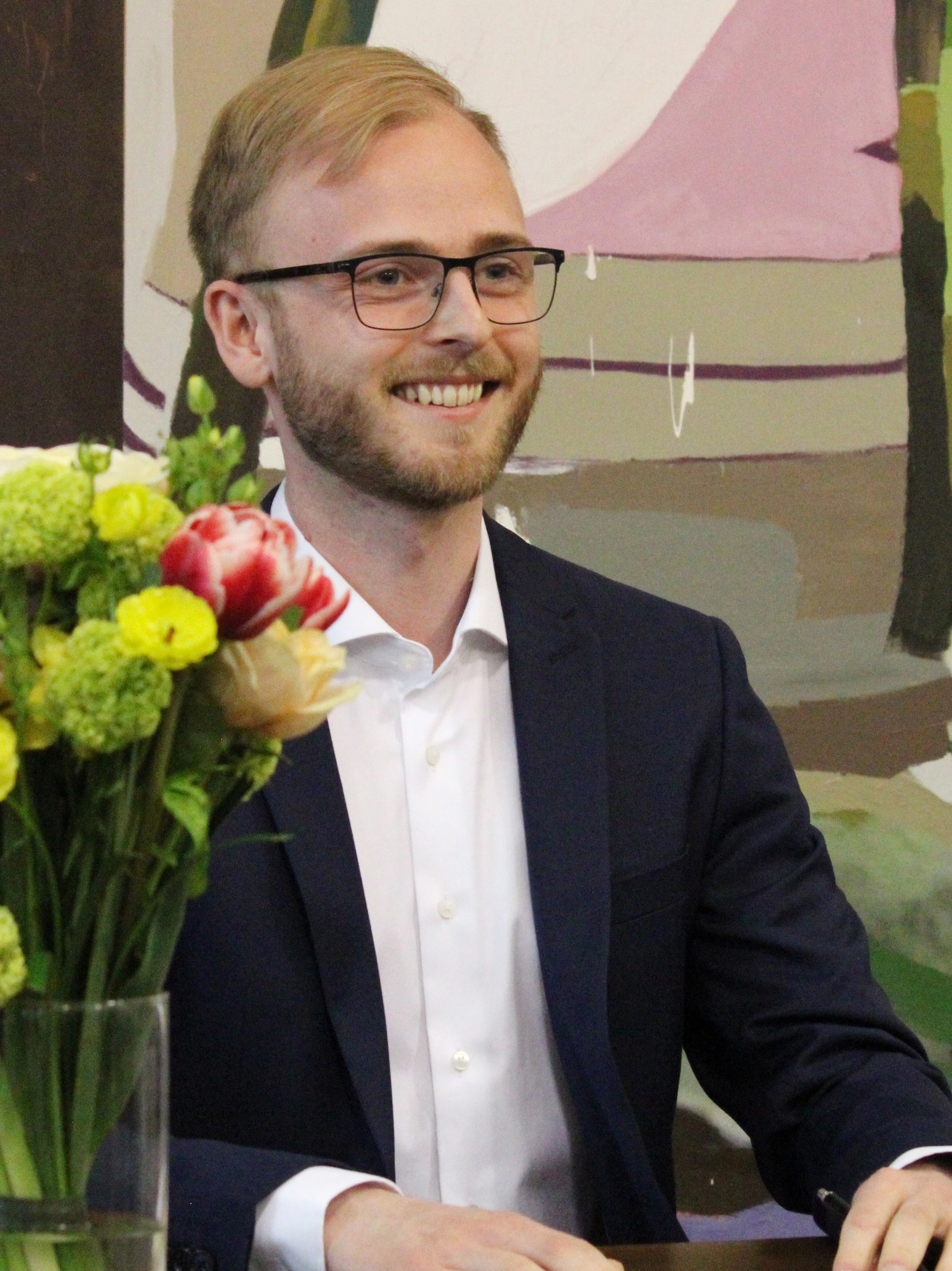
- Vivet in 2026

Member of the Folketing
- Incumbent
- Assumed office 24 March 2026
- Constituency: West Jutland

Personal details
- Born: 20 August 2000 (age 25)
- Party: Danish Social Liberal Party

Philip Vivet (born 20 August 2000) is a Danish politician serving as a member of the Folketing since 2026. He is a regional councillor of Central Denmark and a municipal councillor of Herning.

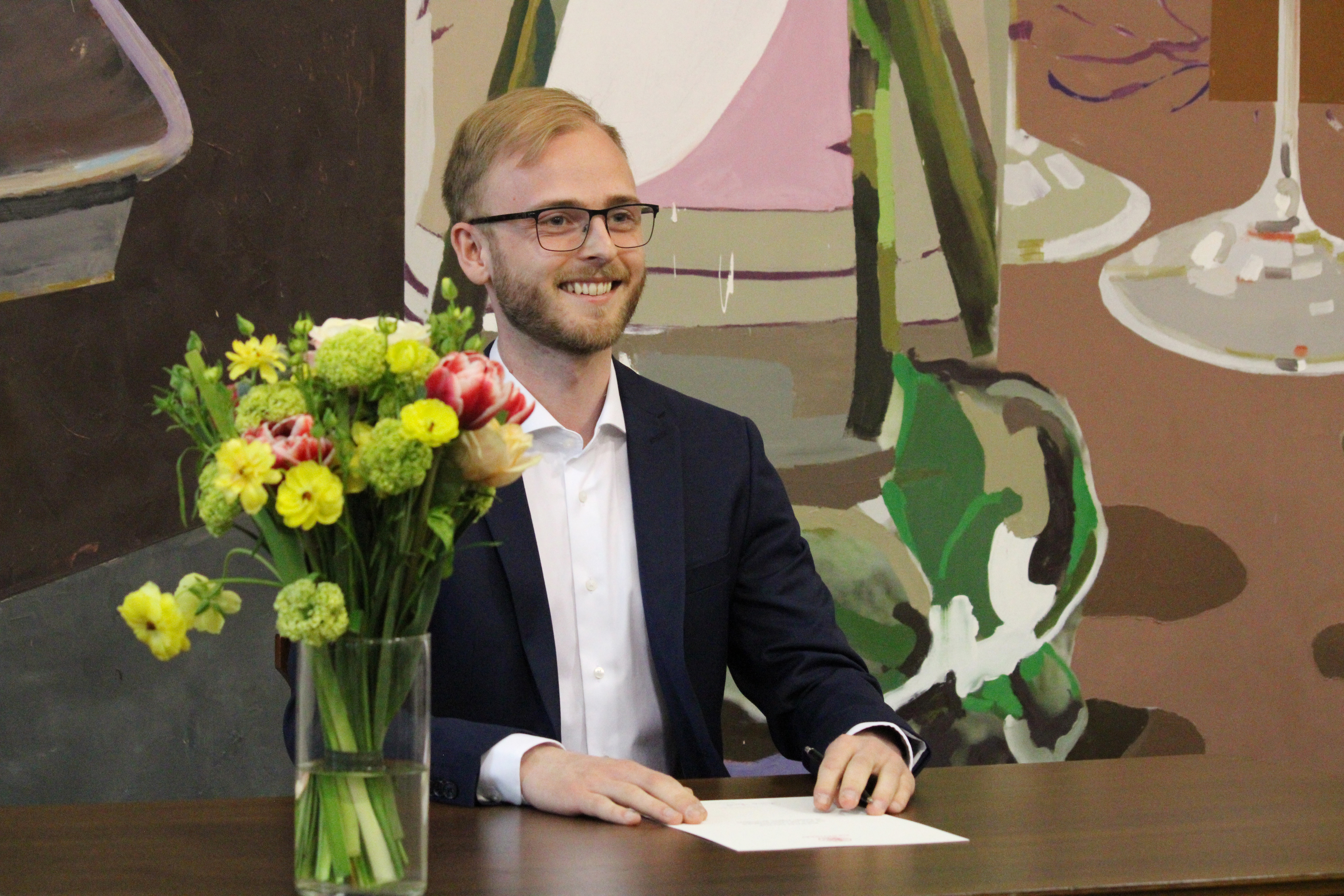
Vivet signing a pledge to uphold the Danish Constitution at Christiansborg, 14 April 2026
