= Katrine Evelyn Jensen =

Danish politician (born 1996)

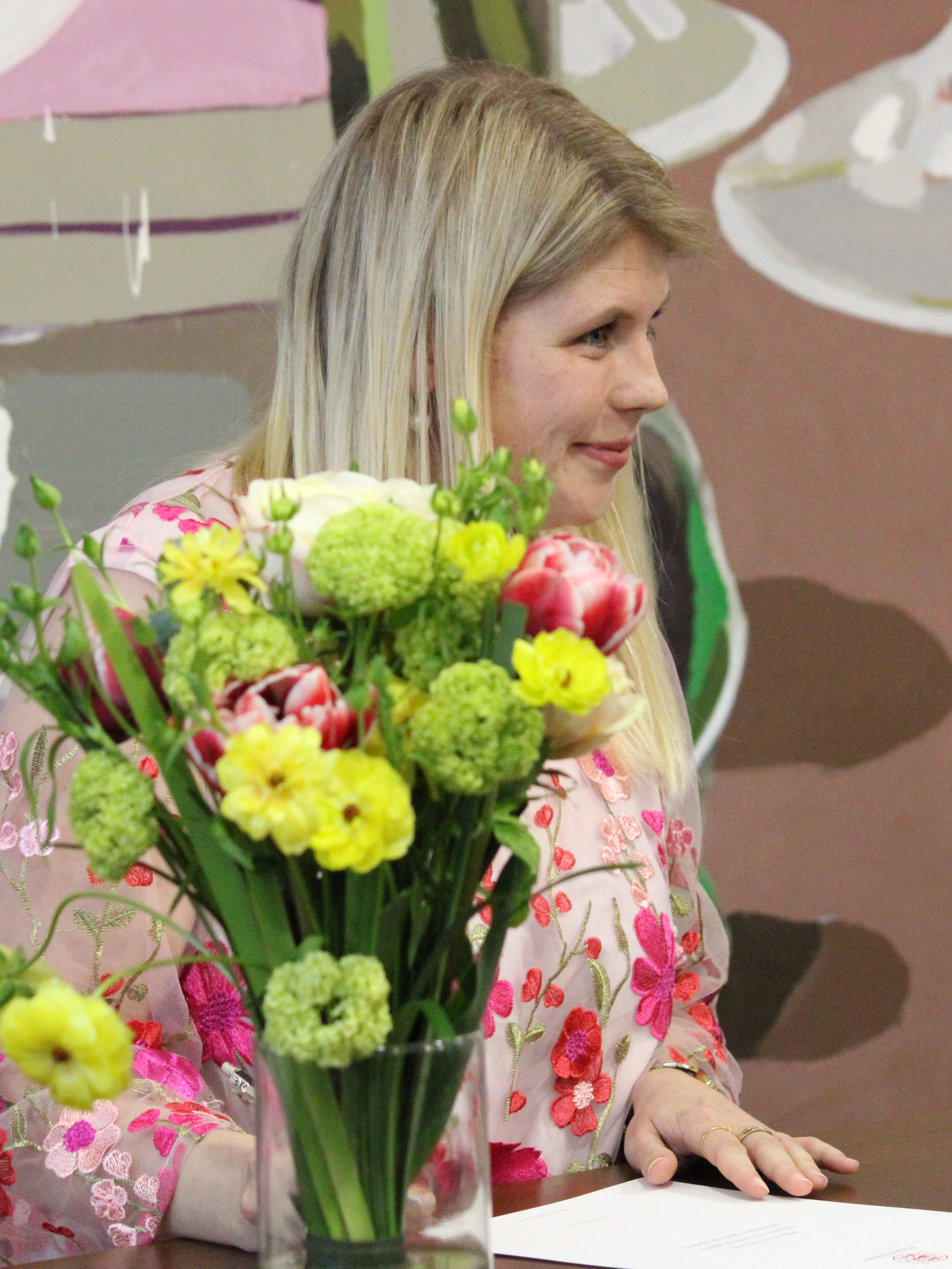
- Jensen in 2026

Member of the Folketing
- Incumbent
- Assumed office 24 March 2026
- Constituency: West Jutland

Personal details
- Born: 27 December 1996 (age 29)
- Party: Social Democrats

Katrine Evelyn Jensen (born 27 December 1996) is a Danish politician who was elected member of the Folketing in 2026. She has served as chairwoman of the Social Democratic Youth since 2022.

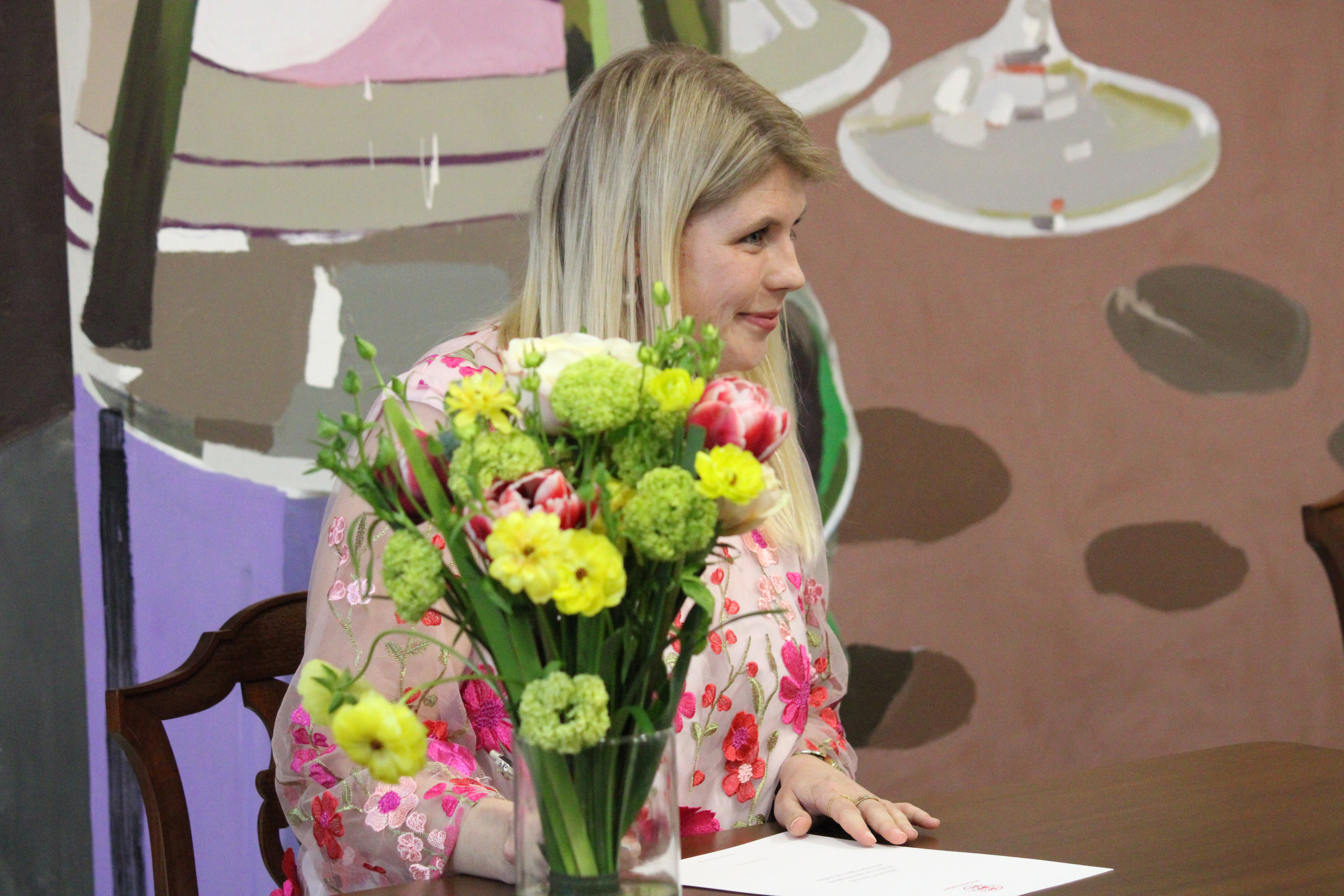
Jensen signing a pledge to uphold the Danish Constitution at Christiansborg, 14 April 2026
