= Alfred Jensen (politician) =

Danish politician (1903–1988)

The Honourable Peter Alfred Jensen
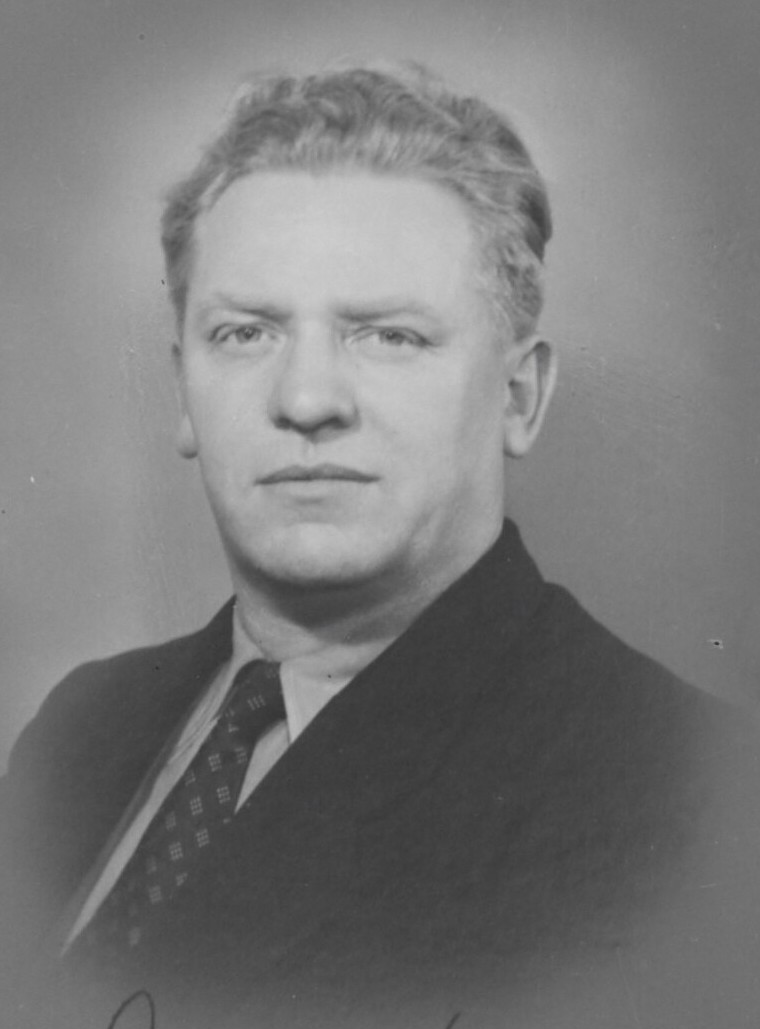

Minister of Traffic
- In office 1945–1945

Member of the Folketing
- In office 1936–1960

Personal details
- Born: 7 July 1903 Århus, Denmark
- Died: 13 January 1988
- Party: Communist Party of Denmark (DKP)

Peter Alfred Jensen (7 July 1903 – 13 January 1988) was a Danish politician and government minister. He was a member of the Danish Communist Party (DKP) of which he served as vice-chairman.

Jensen was born in Århus. He was a member of Frihedsrådet during the Second World War. He became a minister of transport in the "liberation" cabinet of Vilhelm Buhl. He was first elected to parliament in 1936 and retired in 1960.

During the 1950s his house was put under surveillance by the Danish Gladio, according to the official PET Commission.

Political offices
Preceded by German military rule (last Minister of Transport: Niels Elgaard)	Minister of Traffic; 5 May 1945 – 7 November 1945	Succeeded by Niels Elgaard
