= Lisbeth Torfing =

Danish politician (born 1987)

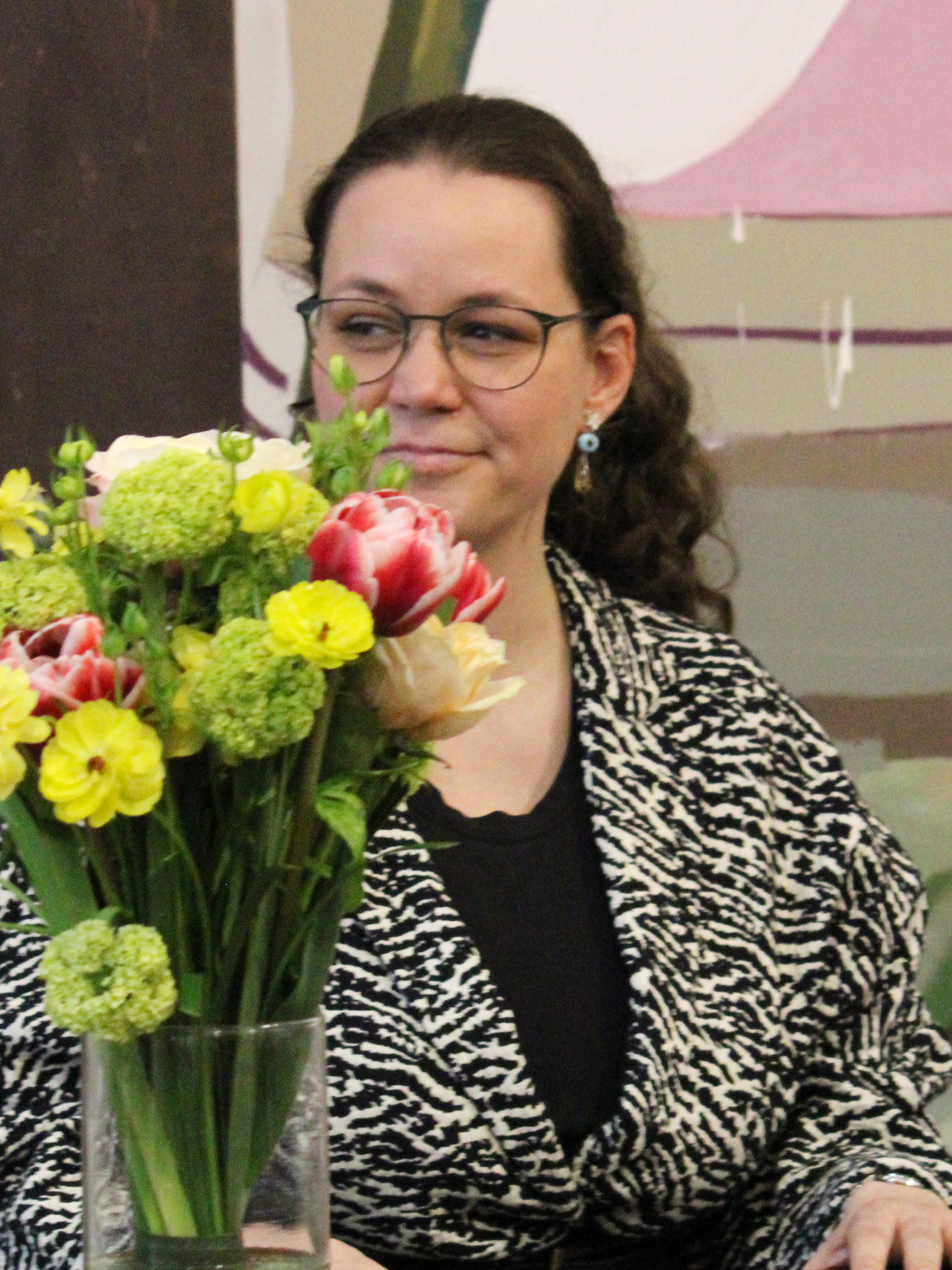

Member of the Folketing
- Incumbent
- Assumed office 24 March 2026
- Constituency: West Jutland

Personal details
- Born: Lisbeth Heidemann; 12 July 1987 (age 39) Frederiksberg, Denmark
- Party: Red–Green Alliance
- Education: University of Iceland; Aarhus University

Lisbeth Heidemann Torfing (born 12 July 1987) is a Danish politician and Member of the Folketing. A member of the Red–Green Alliance, she has represented West Jutland since March 2026.

Torfing was born on 12 July 1987 in Frederiksberg. She has a MA degree in Icelandic Medieval Studies from the University of Iceland (2011) and a PhD in Nordic Language and Literature from Aarhus University (2016). She was an external lecturer at Aarhus University (2016–2017) and an editor at education publisher Better Students (2017–2019).

Torfing was a board member of the Red–Green Alliance between 2020 and 2022. She has been a member of the municipal council in Horsens since 2018. She was elected to the Folketing at the 2026 general election.

Torfing is married to Tobias Torfing and has two children. She lives in Grumstrup near Hovedgård.

Electoral history of Lisbeth Torfing
Election	Constituency	Party	Personal votes	Total votes	Result
2017 local	Horsens Municipality	Red–Green Alliance	519		Elected
2021 local	Horsens Municipality	Red–Green Alliance	768		Elected
2021 local	Mid-Jutland Region	Red–Green Alliance	574		Not elected
2022 general	East Jutland	Red–Green Alliance	564	1,501	Not elected
2025 local	Horsens Municipality	Red–Green Alliance	828		Elected
2026 general	West Jutland	Red–Green Alliance	644	2,521	Not elected (Note: Torfing entered the Folketing as one of the Red–Green Alliance's compensatory seats.)
