= Karin Liltorp =

Danish politician (born 1972)

Member of the Folketing
- Incumbent
- Assumed office 1 November 2022
- Constituency: East Jutland

Personal details
- Born: 6 May 1972 (age 54) Hjørring, Denmark
- Party: The Alternative (since 2025)
- Other political affiliations: Moderates (until 2025)
- Occupation: Politician

Karin Liltorp (born 6 May 1972) is a Danish politician and a member of the Folketing for Copenhagen from the Moderates. Alongside sixteen other members of the Moderates, Liltorp was elected to the Folketing in November 2022. She was her party's spokesperson on global environment, higher education, research and the European Union. In February 2025, she announced she was leaving the party. She joined the Alternative a short time later.

== See also ==
- List of members of the Folketing, 2022–present
