= René Gade =

Danish politician

Member of the Folketing
- In office 18 June 2015 – 5 June 2019
- Constituency: West Jutland

Personal details
- Born: 31 January 1982 (age 44) Silkeborg, Denmark
- Party: The Alternative

René Gade Mikkelsen (born 31 January 1982 in Silkeborg) is a Danish politician, who was a member of the Folketing for The Alternative from 2015 to 2019.

René Gade Mikkelsen (born 31 January 1982 in Silkeborg) is a Danish politician, who was a member of the Folketing for The Alternative from 2015 to 2019.

== Political career ==
Gade was first elected into parliament at the 2015 Danish general election, where he received 1,112 votes. He did not run again in 2019. He attempted to found his own party, with the intention of removing the title of Prime Minister and instead let someone from outside politics take over the role as leader. He was unsuccessful in establishing the party, with the project lasting for eight months.
