= Jeppe Søe =

Danish politician (born 1971)

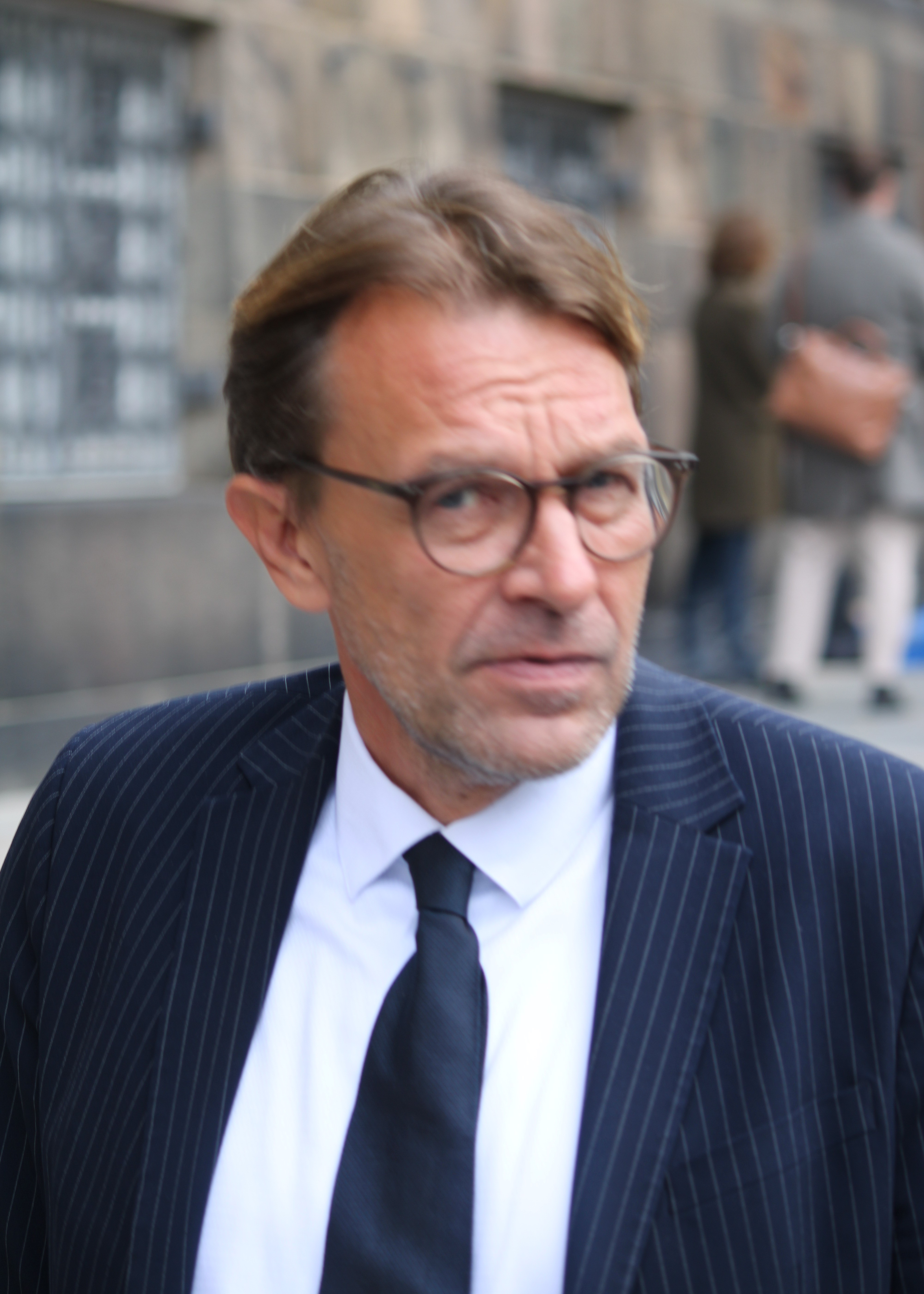
- Søe in 2025

Member of the Folketing
- Incumbent
- Assumed office 1 November 2022
- Constituency: West Jutland

Personal details
- Born: 19 February 1971 (age 55) Humlebæk, Denmark
- Party: Independent
- Other political affiliations: Moderates (until 2024)
- Occupation: Politician

Jeppe Søe (born 19 February 1971) is a Danish politician and Member of the Folketing for West Jutland from the Moderates. Alongside sixteen other members of The Moderates, Søe was elected to the Folketing in November 2022. He was his party's spokesperson on values, ecclesiastical affairs, digitalisation, IT and labour markets.

In September 2024 he left the Moderates, following accusations of a toxic work environment in his office.

== See also ==
- List of members of the Folketing, 2022–present
