= Thorbjørn Jacobsen =

Danish politician (born 1980)

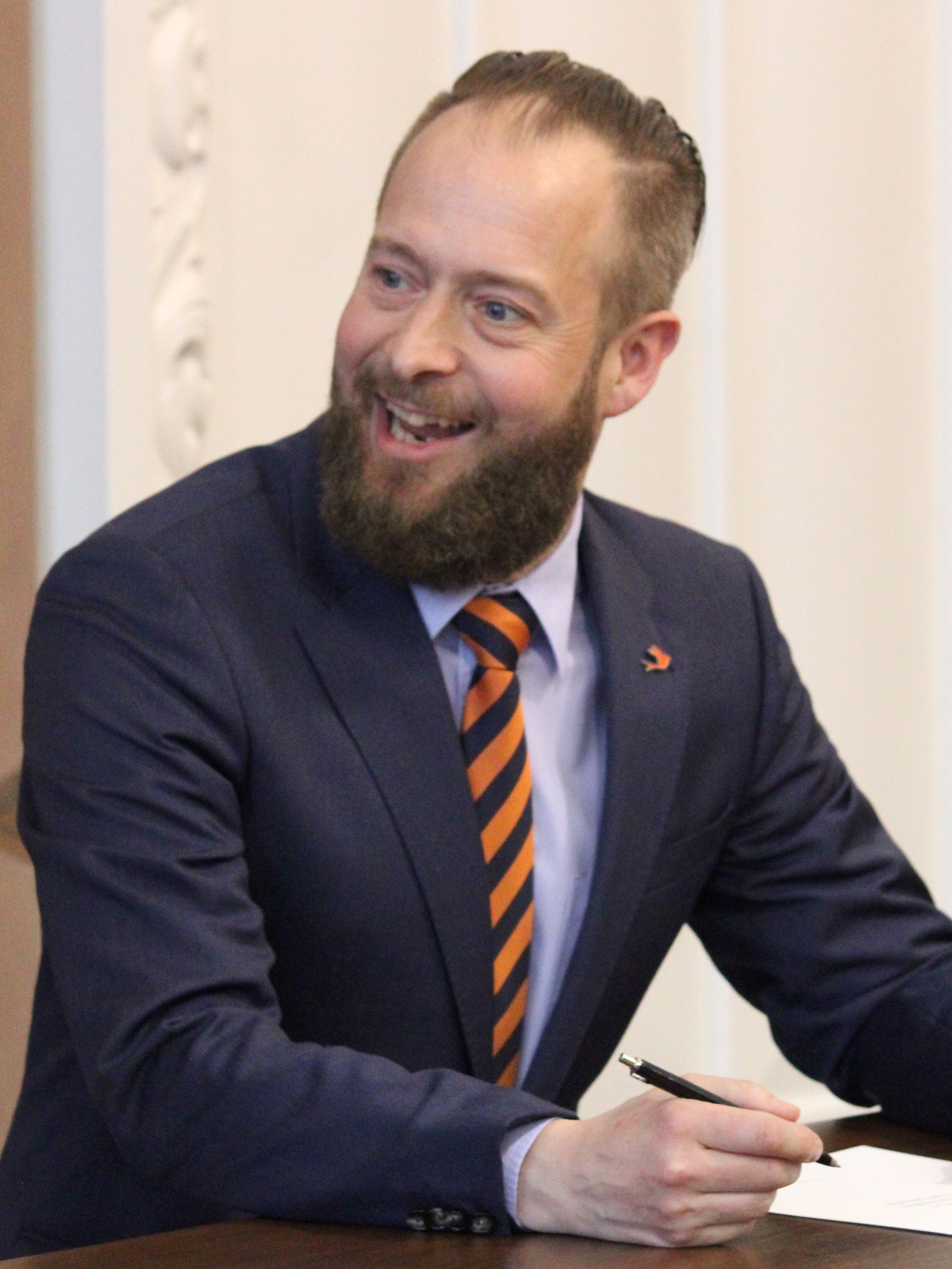
- Jacobsen in 2026

Member of the Folketing
- Incumbent
- Assumed office 24 March 2026
- Constituency: West Jutland

Personal details
- Born: 9 November 1980 (age 45)
- Party: Liberal Alliance

Thorbjørn Jacobsen (born 9 November 1980) is a Danish politician who was elected member of the Folketing in 2026. He has served as chairman of the Liberal Alliance in Holstebro, Struer and Lemvig since 2023.

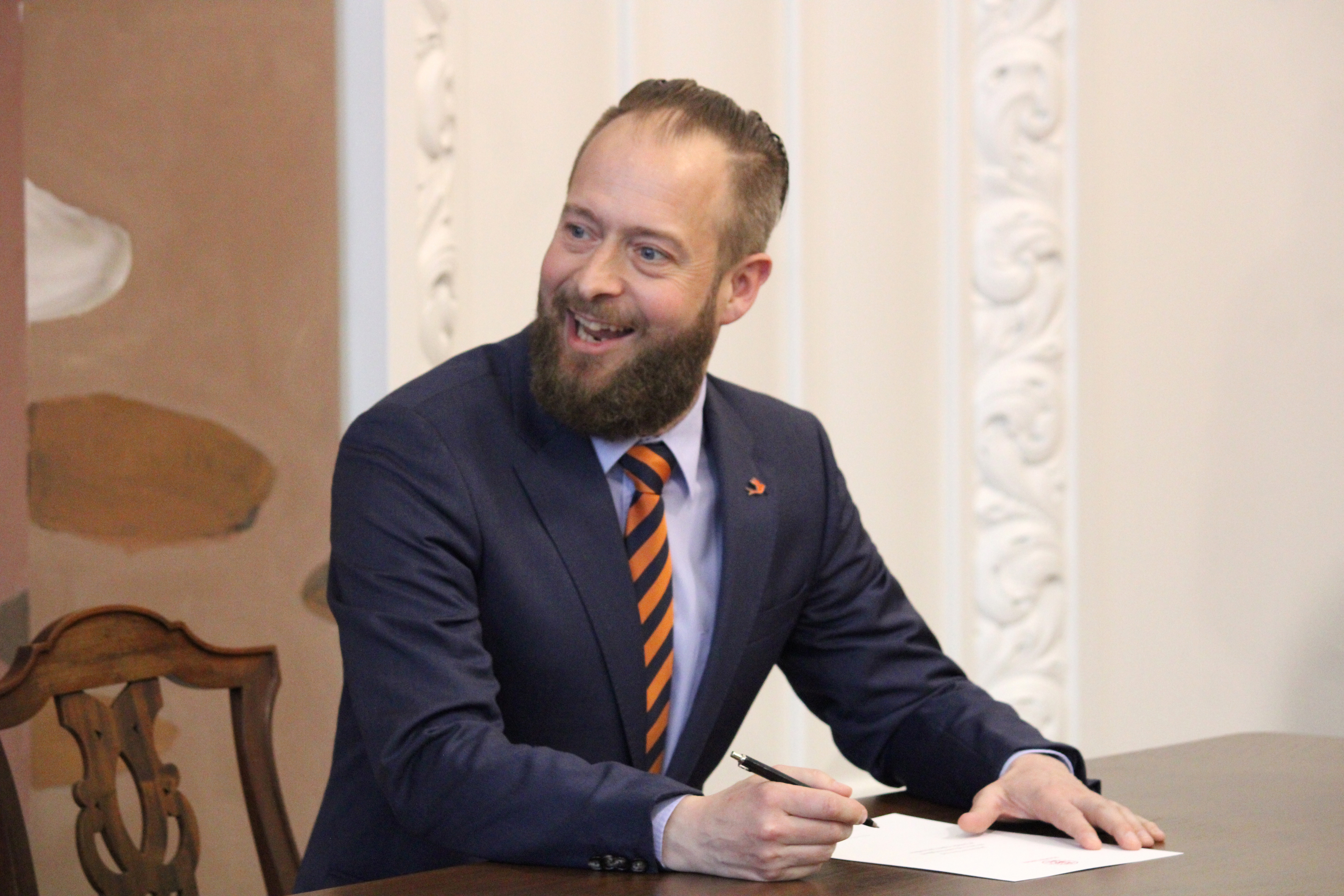
Jacobsen signing a pledge to uphold the Danish Constitution at Christiansborg, 14 April 2026
