= Thomas Danielsen =

Danish politician (born 1983)

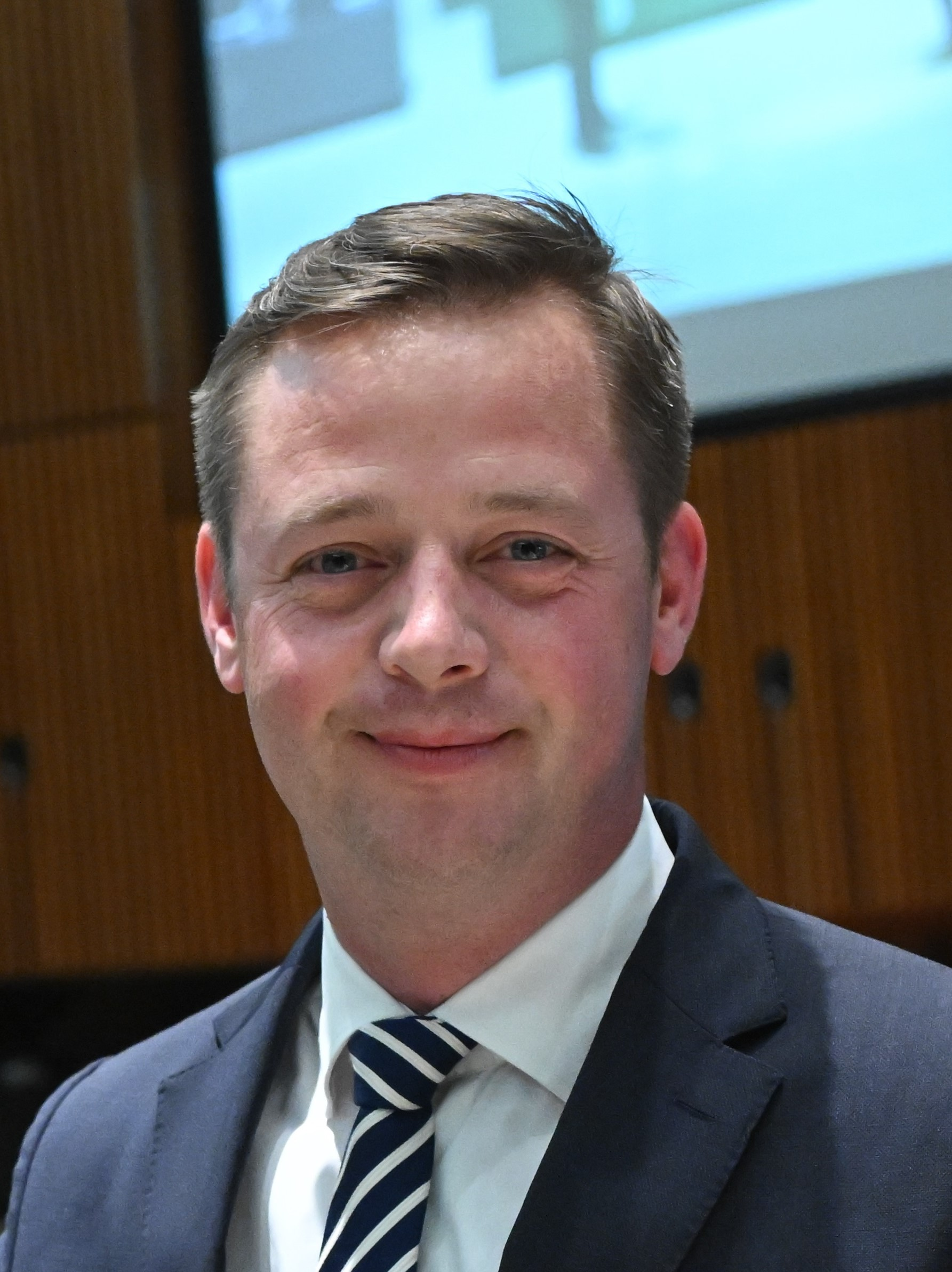
- Danielsen in 2025

Minister of Transport
- In office 15 December 2022 – 3 June 2026
- Prime Minister: Mette Frederiksen
- Preceded by: Trine Bramsen
- Succeeded by: Signe Munk

Member of the Folketing
- Incumbent
- Assumed office 15 September 2011
- Constituency: West Jutland

Personal details
- Born: 24 June 1983 (age 42) Fjerritslev, Denmark
- Party: Venstre

Thomas Nolsøe Danielsen (born 24 June 1983) is a Danish politician who served as Minister for Transport from December 2022 to June 2026. He is also a member of the Folketing for the Venstre political party, elected into parliament at the 2011 Danish general election.

== Early life and career ==
Danielsen trained as a heavy goods vehicle mechanic with Iveco in 2004 and later trained as a banking consultant in 2009. He worked at Sparekassen Holstebro from 2009 until 2011 before being elected to parliament.

== Political career ==
Danielsen was a member of the municipal council of Holstebro Municipality from 2006 to 2013.

Danielsen was first elected into parliament at the 2011 Danish general election, receiving 5,873 votes. He was reelected in 2015 with 8,922 votes and in 2019 with 8,826 votes.
