= Lise Bertelsen =

Danish politician (born 1975)

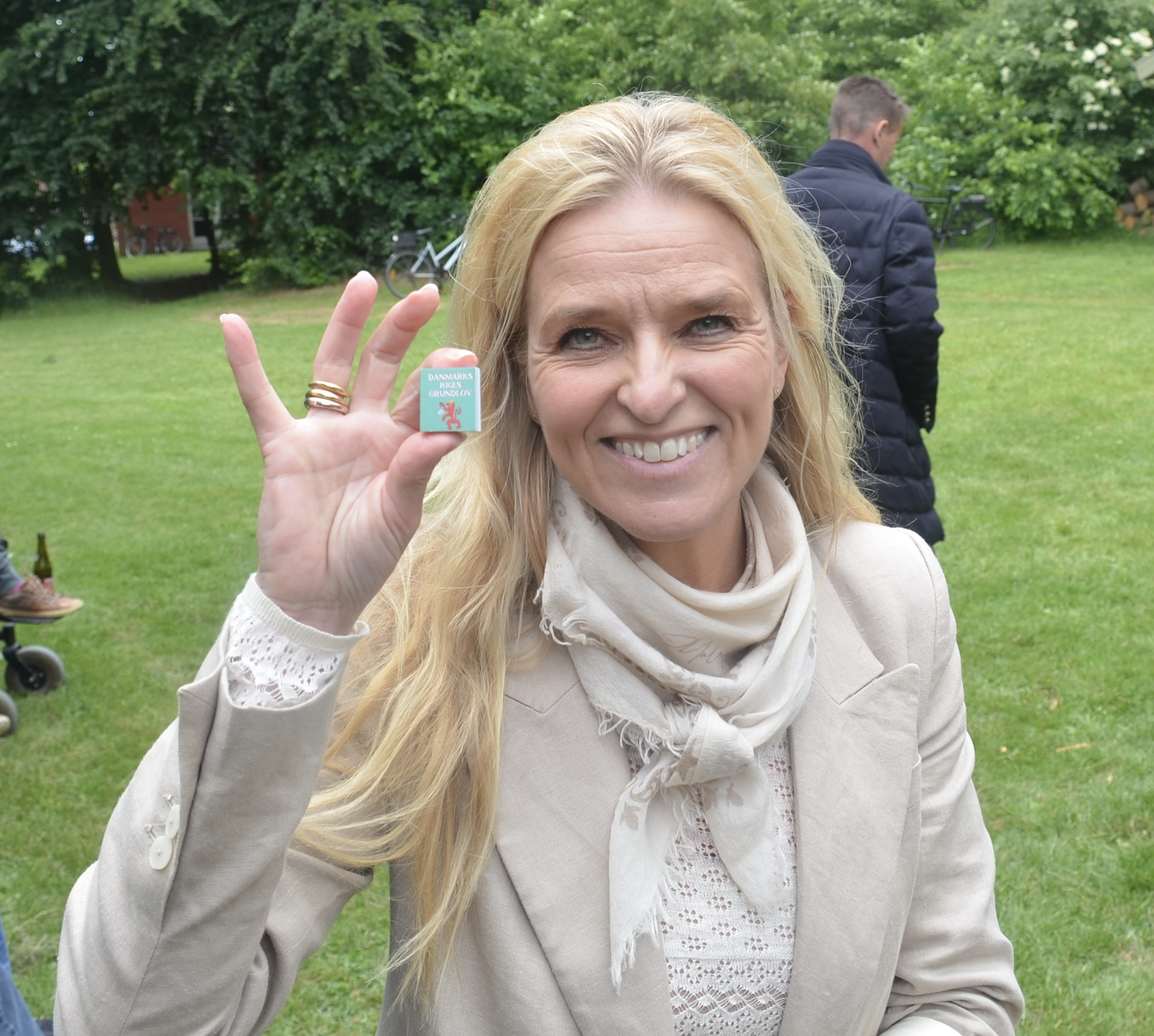

Member of the Folketing
- Incumbent
- Assumed office 1 November 2022
- Constituency: West Jutland

Personal details
- Born: September 8, 1975 (age 50) Aarhus

Lise Bertelsen (born 8 September 1975) is a Danish politician currently serving as Member of the Folketing for the Conservative People's Party since the 2022 Danish general election.

== Career ==
Bertelsen was educated as a special education pedagogue. She was elected to the municipal council of Viborg Municipality at the 2021 Danish local elections. In 2022 Bertelsen was elected to the Folketing with 1,894 personal votes.

== Personal life ==
Bertelsen lives in Viborg, is married and has three children.
