= Anne Paulin =

Danish politician (born 1988)

Member of the Folketing
- Incumbent
- Assumed office 5 June 2019
- Constituency: Zealand

Personal details
- Born: Anne Borch Paulin; 5 January 1988 (age 38) Skive, Denmark
- Party: Social Democrats

Anne Borch Paulin (born 5 January 1988) is a Danish politician, who is a member of the Folketing for the Social Democrats political party. She was elected into parliament at the 2019 Danish general election.

== Political career ==
Paulin served as substitute member of the Folketing from 2 February 2016 to 3 June 2016, substituting for Thomas Jensen. She was elected into parliament at the 2019 election, where she received 6,814 personal votes.
