= Mike Fonseca =

Danish politician (born 1995)

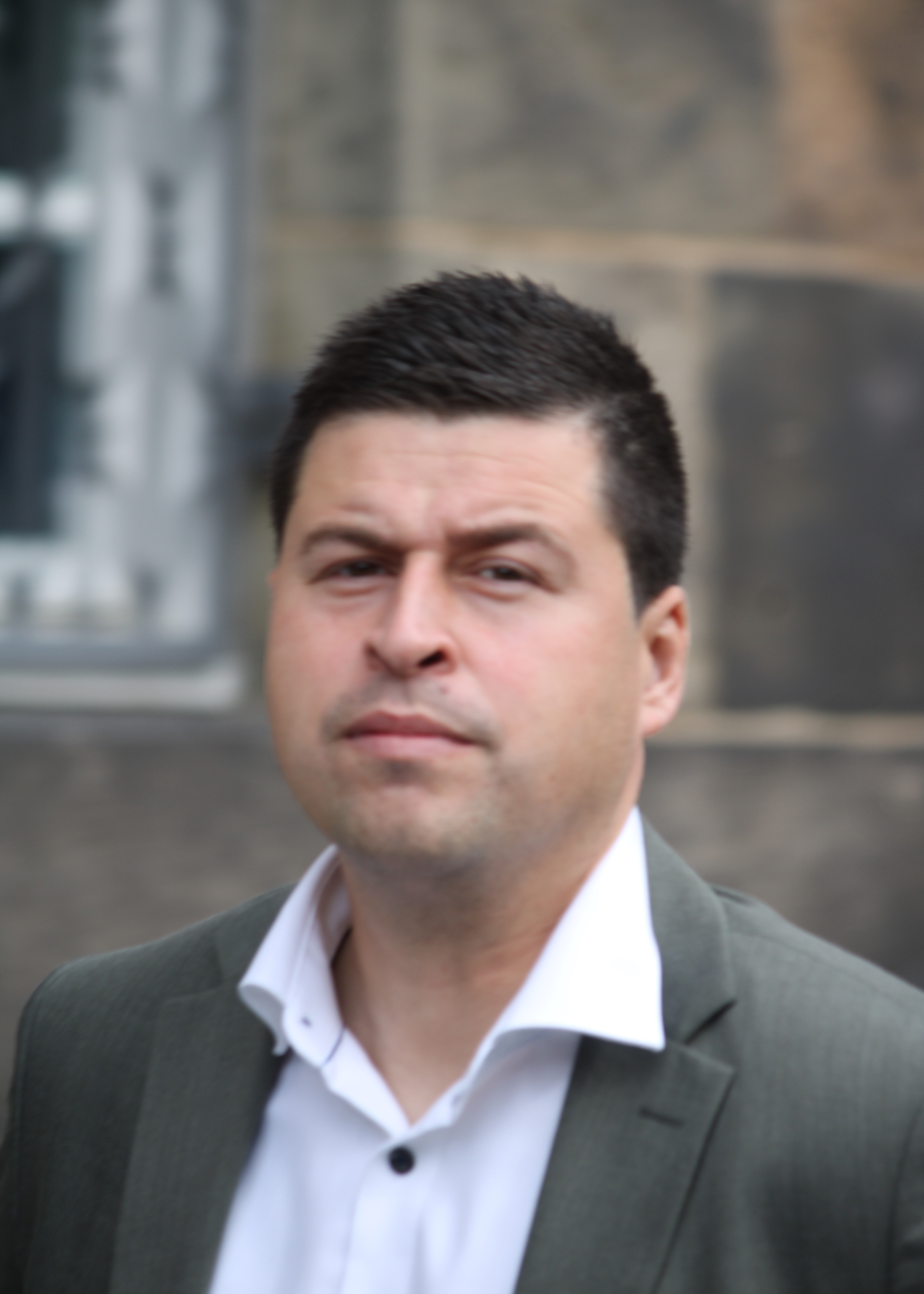
- Fonseca in 2025

Member of the Folketing
- In office 1 November 2022 – 24 March 2026
- Constituency: Zealand

Personal details
- Born: May 1, 1995 (age 31) Køge
- Party: Moderates (2022-2023) New Right (since 2026)
- Occupation: Nurse, politician

Mike Villa Fonseca (born 1 May 1995) is a Danish politician and nurse who served as Member of the Folketing. Previously a member for the Moderates from 2022 to 2023, he became an independent due to violating the Moderates' rules on having sexual partners below the age of 18 by having a 15 year old girlfriend.

== Career ==
Fonseca graduated from Professionshøjskolen Absalon as a nurse in 2020. He has since worked at Køge Sygehus. Fonseca has also worked as a part-time firefighter.

At the 2022 Danish general election, Fonseca was elected after having received 505 personal votes.

In March 2026, before the 2026 Danish general election, Fonseca joined the far-right New Right.
