= Gunvor Wibroe =

Danish politician

Member of the Folketing
- Incumbent
- Assumed office 2 November 2023
- Constituency: Greater Copenhagen

Personal details
- Born: 25 February 1972 (age 54) Randers, Denmark
- Party: Social Democrats

Gunvor Holm Wibroe (born 25 February 1972) is a Danish communications consultant and social democratic politician who is a member of the Folketing, where she per January 2024 is the party's development rapporteur.

She has been a member of the Folketing from 2 November 2023, where she replaced Kasper Sand Kjær, who resigned his mandate. Previously, since 2014, Gunvor Wibroe had been a municipal council member and councilor in Frederiksberg Municipality.
