= Tobias Elmstrøm =

Danish politician

Member of the Folketing
- Incumbent
- Assumed office 1 November 2022
- Constituency: East Jutland

Personal details
- Born: June 12, 1982 (age 44) Horsens, Denmark
- Children: 3
- Education: Aarhus University

Tobias Grotkjær Elmstrøm (born 12 June 1982) is a Danish politician and lawyer serving as Member of the Folketing for the Moderates since 2022.

== Career ==
Elmstrøm graduated from Aarhus University as cand.jur. in 2009. He founded his own law firm, Advokatfirmaet Grotkjær Elmstrøm, in 2013. His firm has been fined 480.000 Danish kroner for six cases involving poor law practice and wrongful dismissal. Elmstrøm has denied that he wrongfully terminated the employee.

At the 2022 Danish general election he was elected to the Folketing after receiving 4.805 personal votes.

== Personal life ==
Elmstrøm is married and has three children. He currently lives in Aarhus.
