= Betina Kastbjerg =

Danish politician (born 1971)

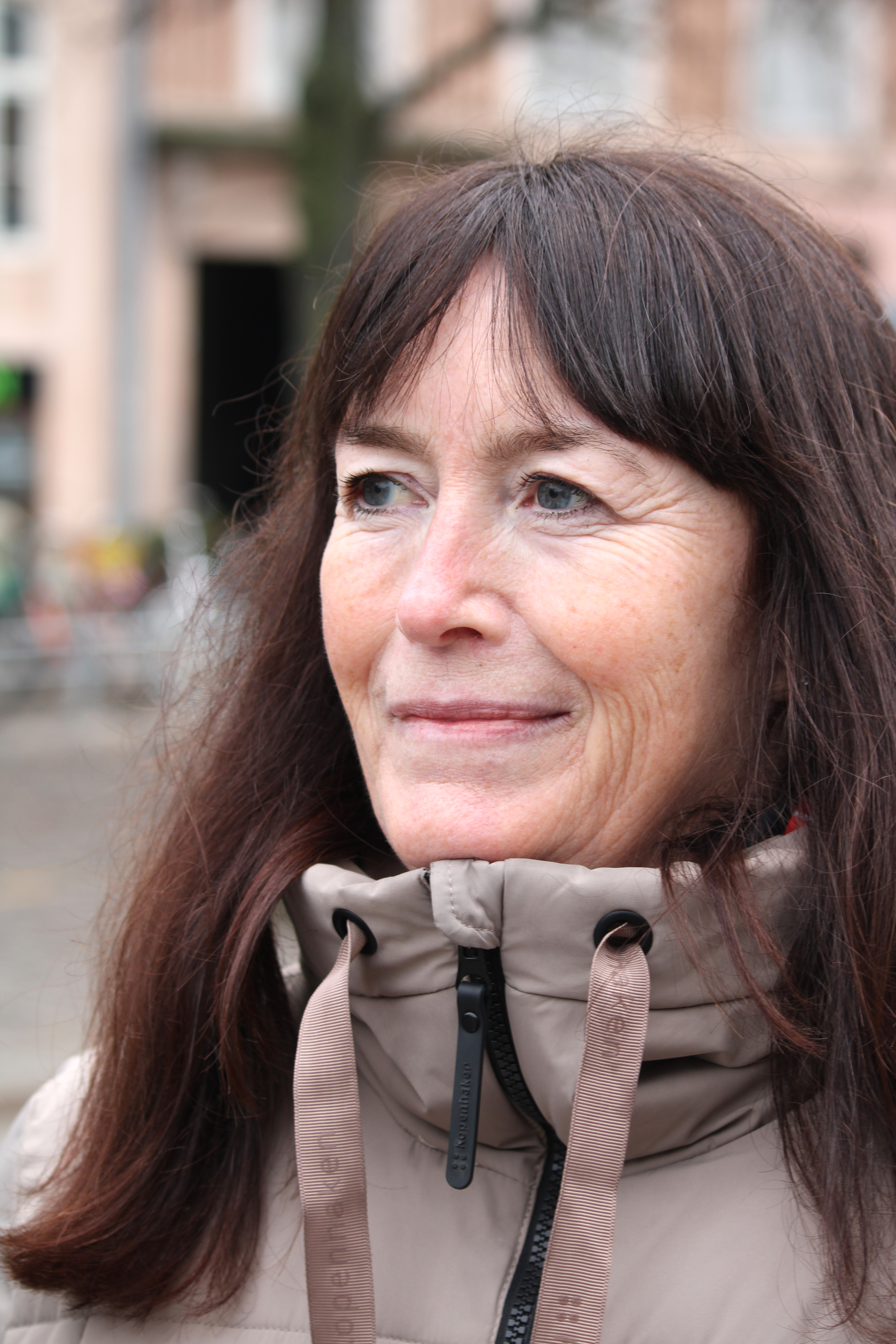
- Kastbjerg in 2026

Member of the Folketing
- Incumbent
- Assumed office 1 November 2022
- Constituency: West Jutland

Personal details
- Born: 1971 (age 54–55) Herning, Denmark
- Party: Denmark Democrats

Betina Kastbjerg (born 1971) is a Danish businesswoman and politician who is a member of the Folketing representing the Denmark Democrats party for the West Jutland constituency.

Kastbjerg worked for a municipal supply company in the public sector before becoming an international project manager for various businesses including Jack & Jones. She is married to a truck driver by whom she has two children. During the 2022 Danish general election she was elected to the Folketing as one of 14 members of parliament for the Denmark Democrats party.
