= Mads Fuglede =

Danish politician (born 1971)

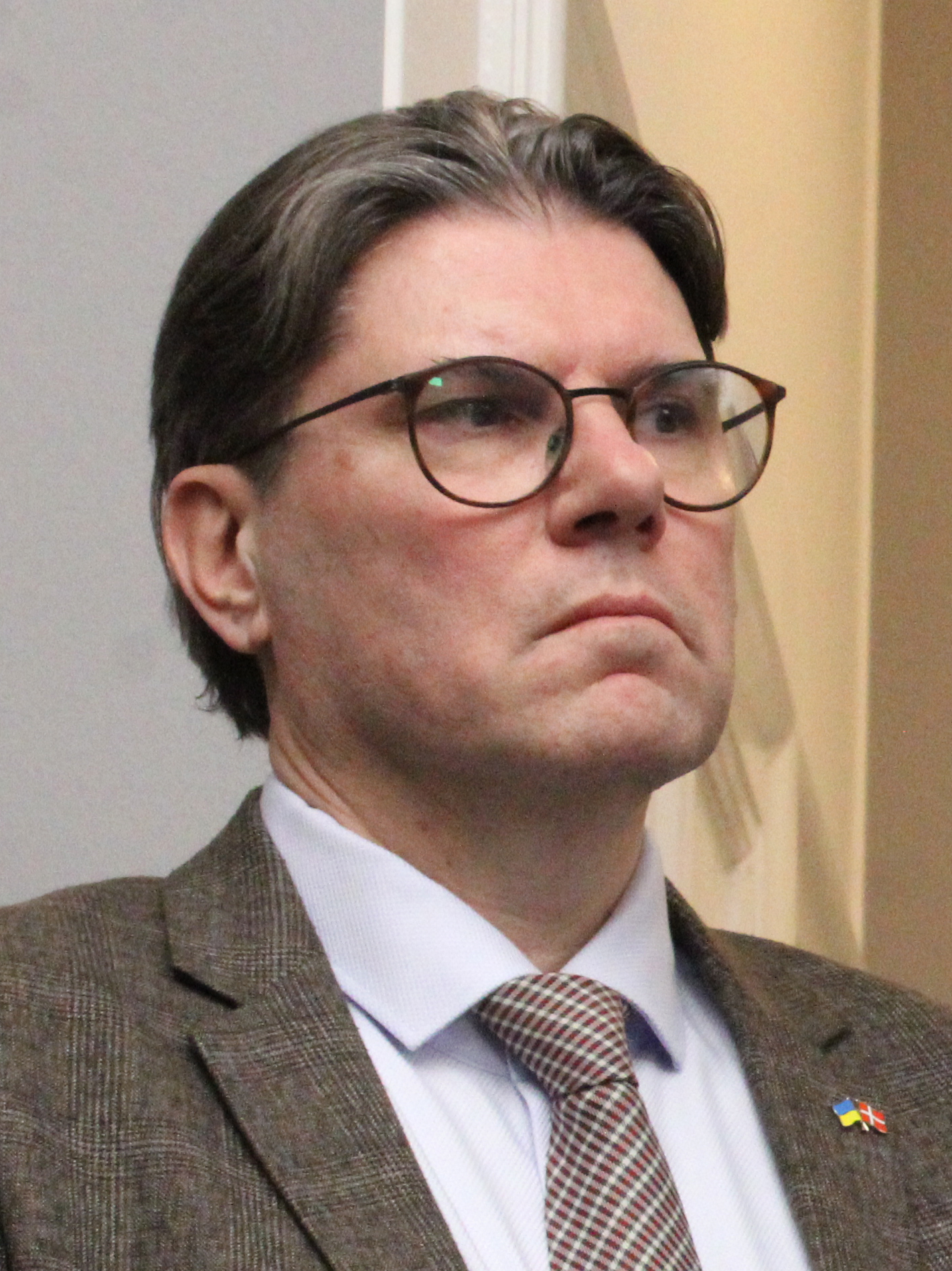
- Fuglede in 2026

Member of the Folketing
- Incumbent
- Assumed office 5 October 2017
- Constituency: West Jutland

Personal details
- Born: 23 August 1971 (age 55) Copenhagen, Denmark
- Party: Denmark Democrats (2024–present)
- Other political affiliations: Venstre (2014–2024)
- Education: Aarhus University
- Profession: Historian, political commentator

Mads Fuglede (born 23 August 1971) is a Danish writer and politician who has been a member of the Folketing since 2017. A former Venstre politician, he has represented the Denmark Democrats since 2024. Fuglede is known as a commentator on United States politics and as the author of a book on American society. In the 2025 local elections he was elected to the municipal council of Ringkøbing-Skjern Municipality, where he was initially presented as mayor-elect before a later coalition agreement instead designated Conservative politician Lennart Qvist as future mayor.

== Early life and career ==
Fuglede was born in Copenhagen on 23 August 1971. His father was a doctor, and during Fuglede's early childhood the family lived for periods in New Zealand and in several Danish towns, including Esbjerg, Haderslev and Hjortshøj, before eventually settling in North Jutland near Dronninglund Storskov. He has described the move to North Jutland as the first time he felt he had a lasting childhood home and a strong sense of belonging to a particular place.

Fuglede studied history and philosophy at Aarhus University, graduating with a master's degree (cand.mag.) in 2004. Alongside his later political work he has taught international politics and United States history at Danish folk high schools and universities and has worked as a lecturer, author and analyst specialising in American politics, including as a commentator on U.S. affairs for TV 2 during several United States presidential elections.

== Political career ==
=== National politics ===
Fuglede was selected as a parliamentary candidate for Venstre in the Gladsaxe constituency in 2014. He first ran for parliament in the 2015 Danish general election, where he received 1,968 votes, which was not enough to gain a seat, although he became Venstre's primary substitute in the constituency.

On 5 October 2017, he entered the Folketing as a substitute member for Jakob Engel-Schmidt, who took leave from his parliamentary mandate, and served for the remainder of the term. Fuglede was subsequently elected in his own right at the 2019 general election, receiving 3,622 personal votes, and was re-elected in 2022 after switching to the Ringkøbing constituency in the West Jutland multi-member district.

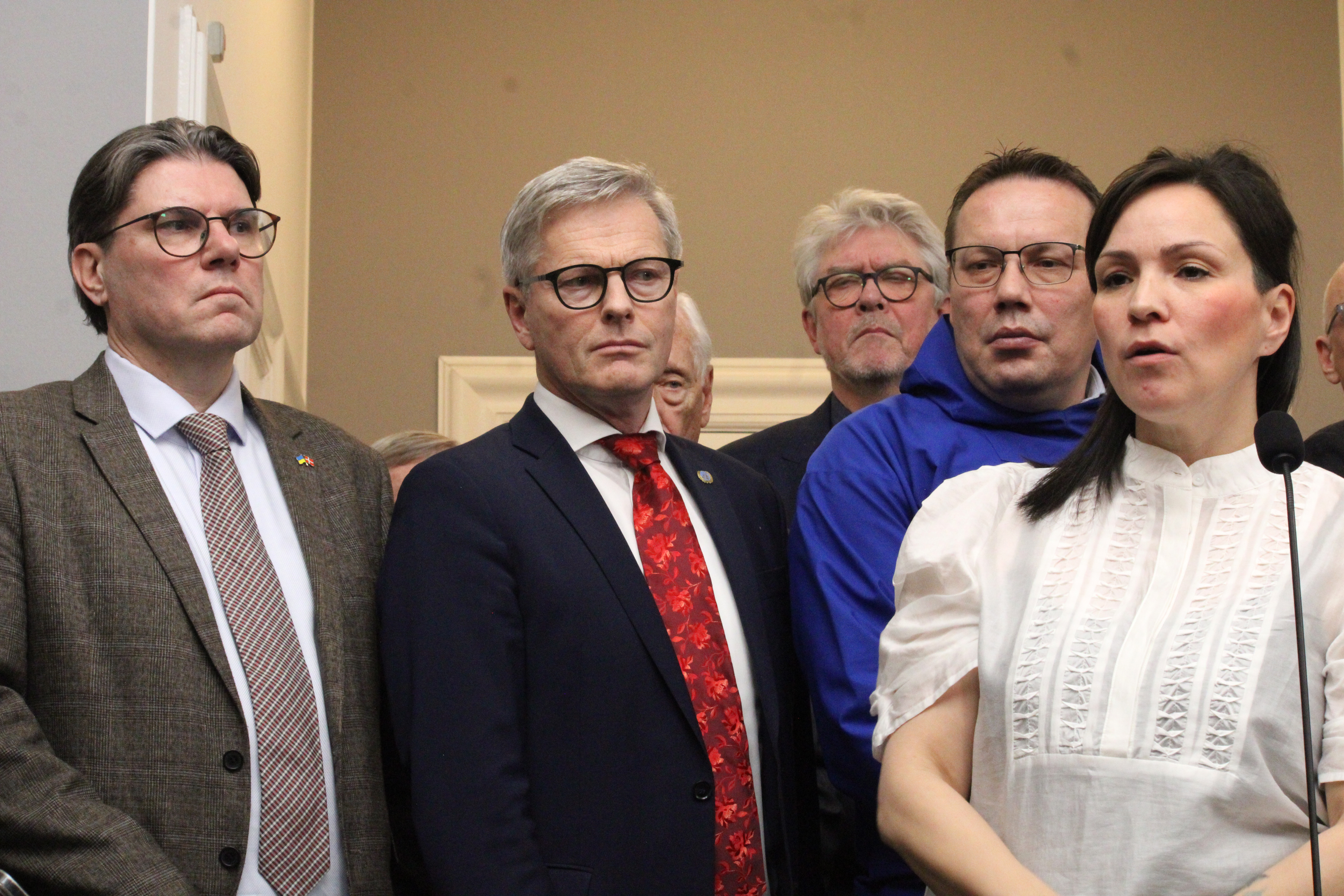
Fuglede with Flemming Møller Mortensen, Erik Jensen and Pipaluk Lynge at Christiansborg during the Greenland crisis, 16 January 2026

On 19 March 2024, Fuglede announced that he was leaving Venstre and joining the Denmark Democrats, citing disagreement with his former party's political line.

=== Local politics ===
In connection with the 2025 local elections, Fuglede stood for the Denmark Democrats in Ringkøbing-Skjern Municipality. The party became the second-largest in the municipal council, and on election night an initial coalition agreement between the Denmark Democrats, the Green Left (SF), the Christian Democrats, the Conservatives, the Danish People's Party and the Liberal Alliance designated Fuglede as the municipality's next mayor from 1 January 2026, which would have made him the first mayor from the Denmark Democrats.

Four days later, however, SF signalled that it might withdraw from the agreement, and a new coalition was subsequently formed between the Conservatives, the Social Democrats, Venstre and SF, which instead pointed to Conservative councillor Lennart Qvist as mayor. The new agreement effectively removed Fuglede and the Denmark Democrats from the mayoralty, although the final choice of mayor is formally made at the constitutive council meeting in December 2025.

== Personal life ==
Fuglede is married to Maria Worm, and the couple have two children. The family lives in the small village of Hvingel in Ringkøbing-Skjern Municipality in western Jutland, where they moved after deciding to settle in the region.

== Bibliography ==
- USA – den universelle nation (Gyldendal, 2008)
