= Signe Munk =

Danish politician

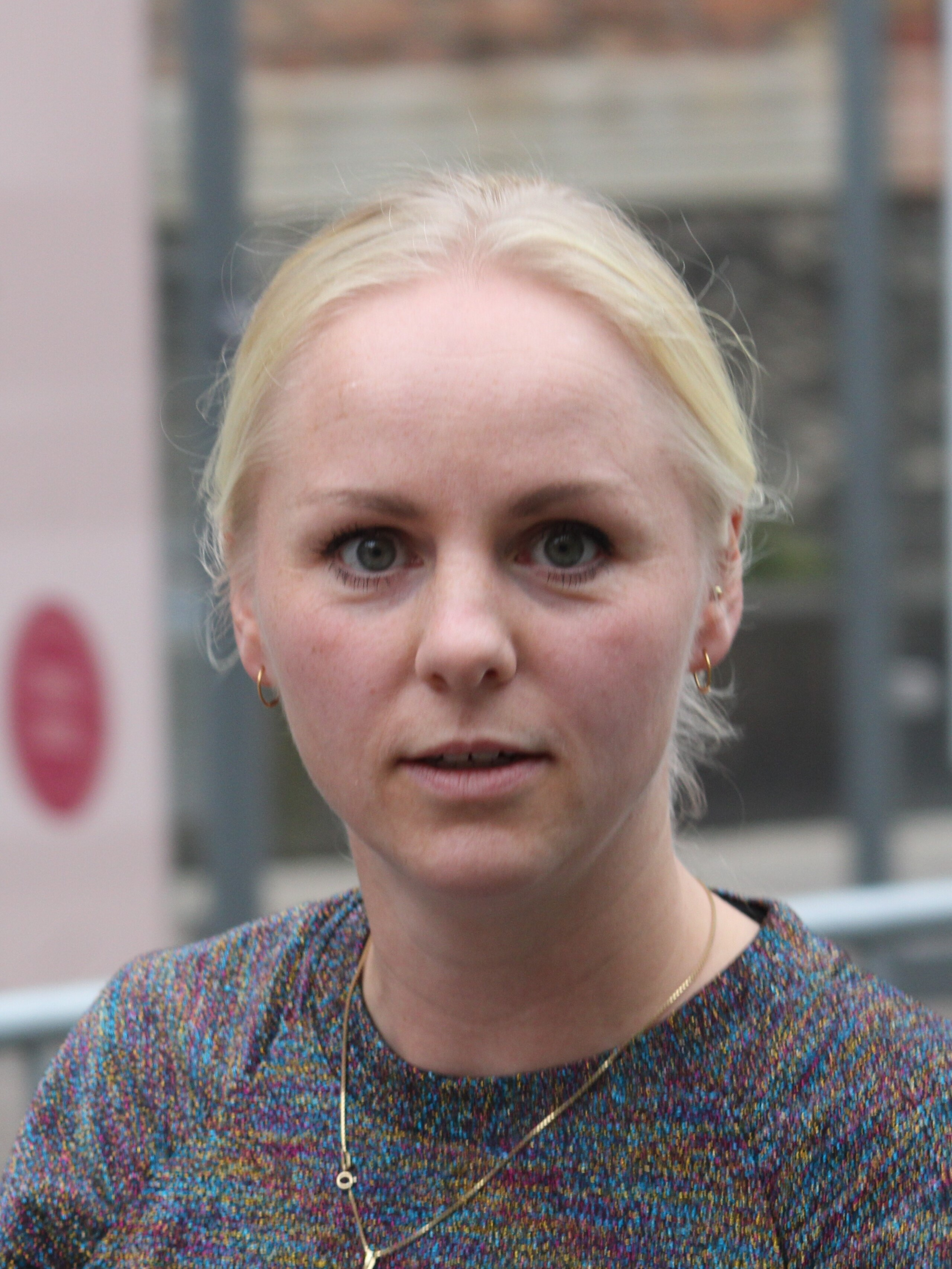
- Munk in 2025

Minister of Cities, Rural Areas, and Transport
- Incumbent
- Assumed office 3 June 2026
- Prime Minister: Mette Frederiksen
- Preceded by: Thomas Danielsen

Member of the Folketing
- Incumbent
- Assumed office 5 June 2019
- Constituency: West Jutland

Personal details
- Born: 10 April 1990 (age 36) Odense, Denmark
- Party: Socialist People's Party

Signe Munk (born 10 March 1990) is a Danish politician, who is a member of the Folketing for the Socialist People's Party. She was elected into parliament at the 2019 Danish general election.

== Political career ==
Munk was a member of the municipal council of Viborg Municipality from 2009 to 2013. She was elected into parliament at the 2019 election, where she received 6,285 personal votes.
