= Dennis Flydtkjær =

Danish politician

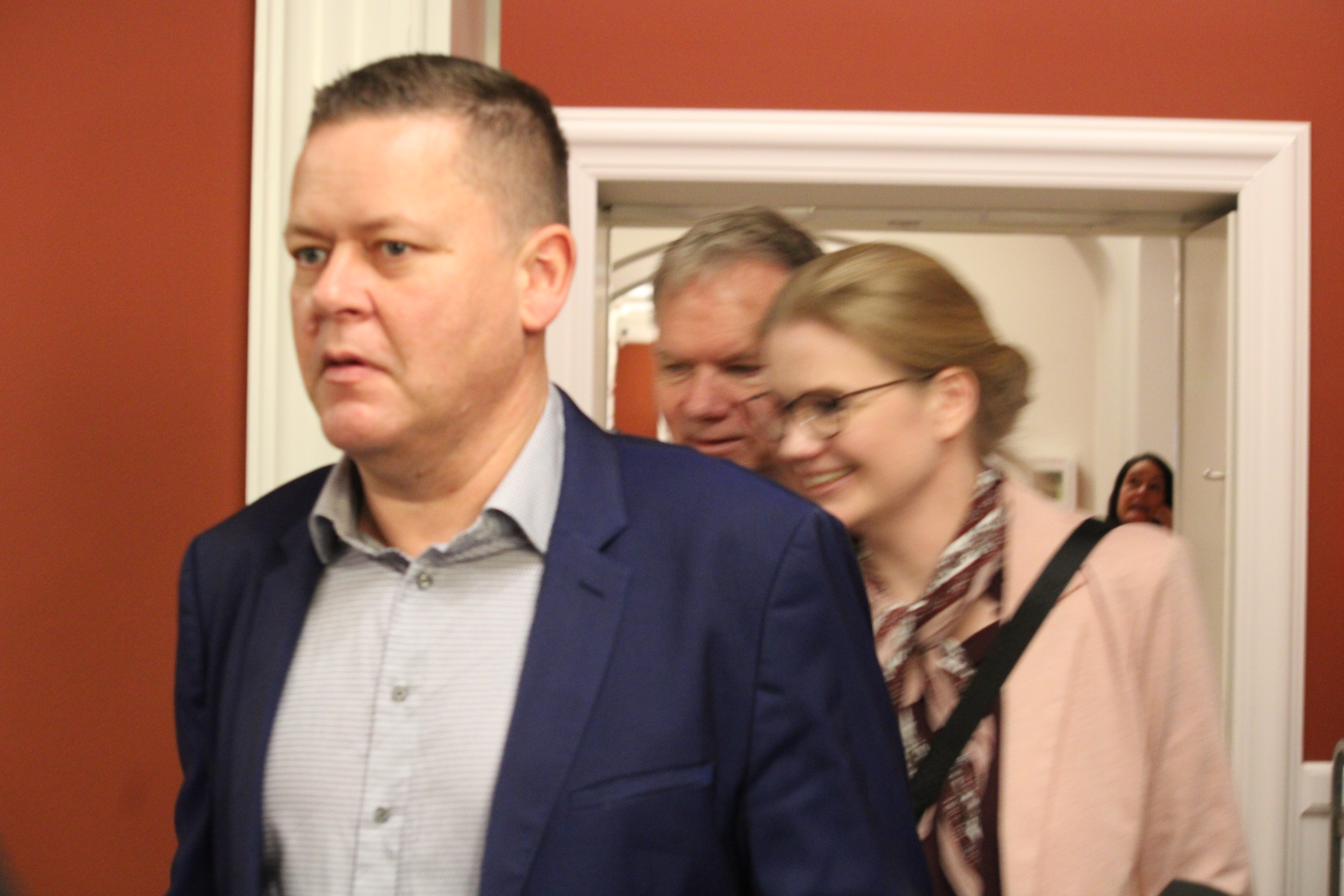
- Flydtkjær in 2025

Member of the Folketing
- Incumbent
- Assumed office 15 September 2011
- Constituency: West Jutland

Personal details
- Born: 13 March 1978 (age 48) Videbæk, Denmark
- Party: Danish People's Party (until 2022)

Dennis Flydtkjær (born 13 March 1978) is a Danish politician, who is a member of the Folketing for the Danish People's Party. He was elected into parliament at the 2011 Danish general election.

== Political career ==
Flydtkjær was a member of the municipal council of Herning Municipality from 2014 to 2017.

Flydtkjær has been a candidate for the Danish People's Party since 2004. He was a substitute member for the party in the Ringkøbing constituency in the 2005—2007 term and again in the 2007—2011 term. He was called upon to substitute for Christian H. Hansen on two separate occasions: from 23 May 2006 to 2 June 2006 and from 20 November 2008 to 31 January 2010. In the 2011 election he was elected into parliament, receiving 3,980 votes. He was reelected in 2015 with 9,097 votes and in 2019 with 4,622 votes.
