= Kasper Sand Kjær =

Danish politician

Member of the Folketing
- In office 5 June 2019 – 2 November 2023
- Succeeded by: Gunvor Wibroe
- Constituency: Greater Copenhagen

Personal details
- Born: 4 May 1989 (age 36) Randers, Denmark
- Party: Social Democrats

Kasper Sand Kjær (born 4 May 1989) is a Danish politician who was a member of the Folketing for the Social Democrats political party. He was first elected into parliament in the 2019 Danish general election.

Kjær was elected into parliament in the 2019 election, where he received 3,065 personal votes. Re-elected in 2022, he resigned in November 2023.
