= Carsten Bach =

Danish politician

Member of the Folketing
- In office 18 June 2015 – 5 June 2019
- Constituency: East Jutland

Personal details
- Born: 9 December 1975 (age 50) Holstebro, Denmark
- Party: Liberal Alliance

Carsten Bach Riis (born 9 December 1975) is a Danish politician, who was a member of the Folketing for the Liberal Alliance from 2015 to 2019.

== Political career ==
Bach was elected into parliament at the 2015 Danish general election, where he received 1,931 votes. This was enough for one of the Liberal Alliance's levelling seats. In the 2019 election he received 734 votes and did not get reelected.
