= Thomas Jensen (politician) =

Danish politician

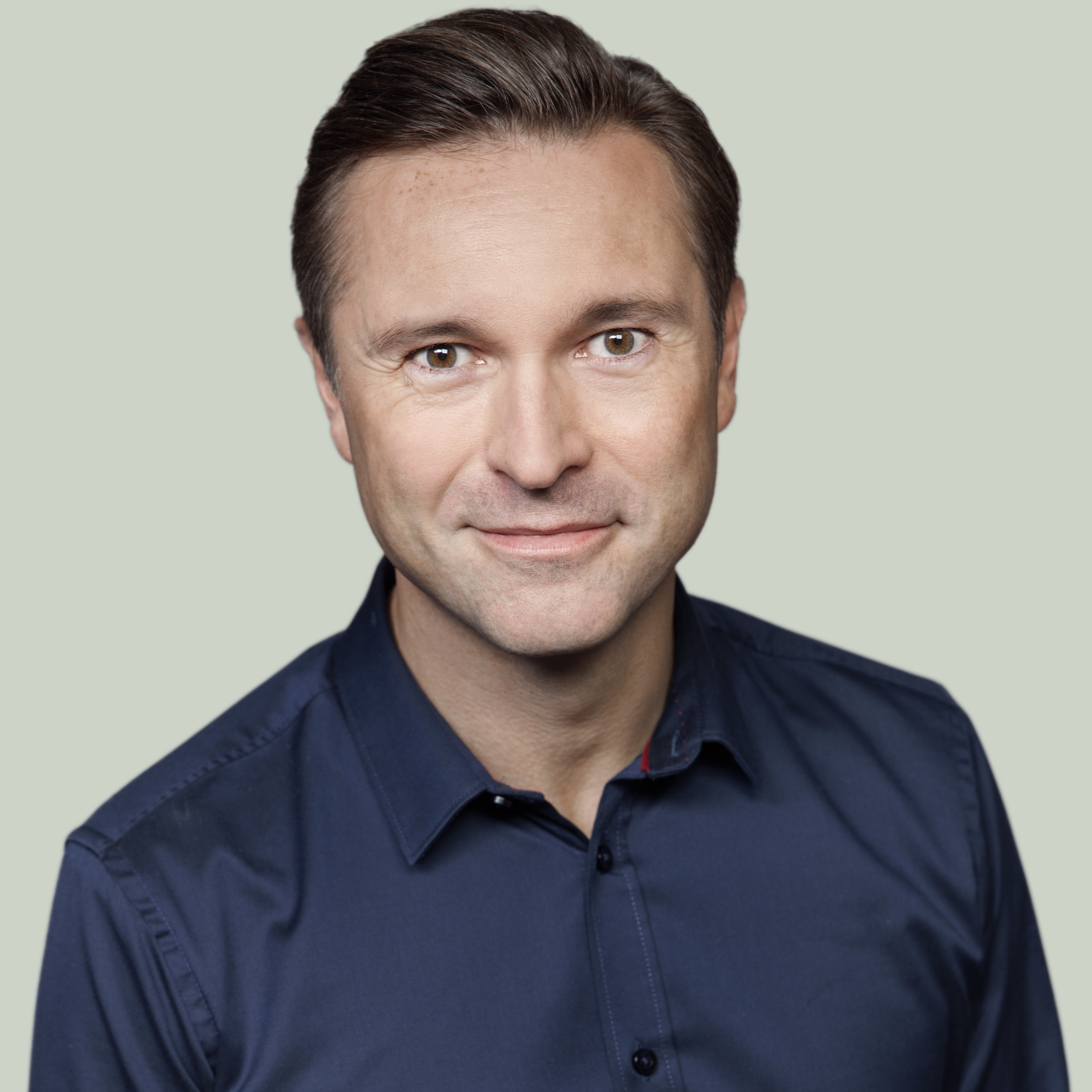

Member of the Folketing
- In office 13 November 2007 – 24 March 2026
- Constituency: West Jutland

Personal details
- Born: 19 October 1970 (age 55) Aarhus, Denmark
- Party: Social Democrats

Thomas Jensen (born 19 October 1970) is a Danish politician, who was a member of the Folketing for the Social Democrats political party from 13 November 2007 until 24 March 2026. He was first elected into parliament at the 2007 Danish general election.

== Political career ==
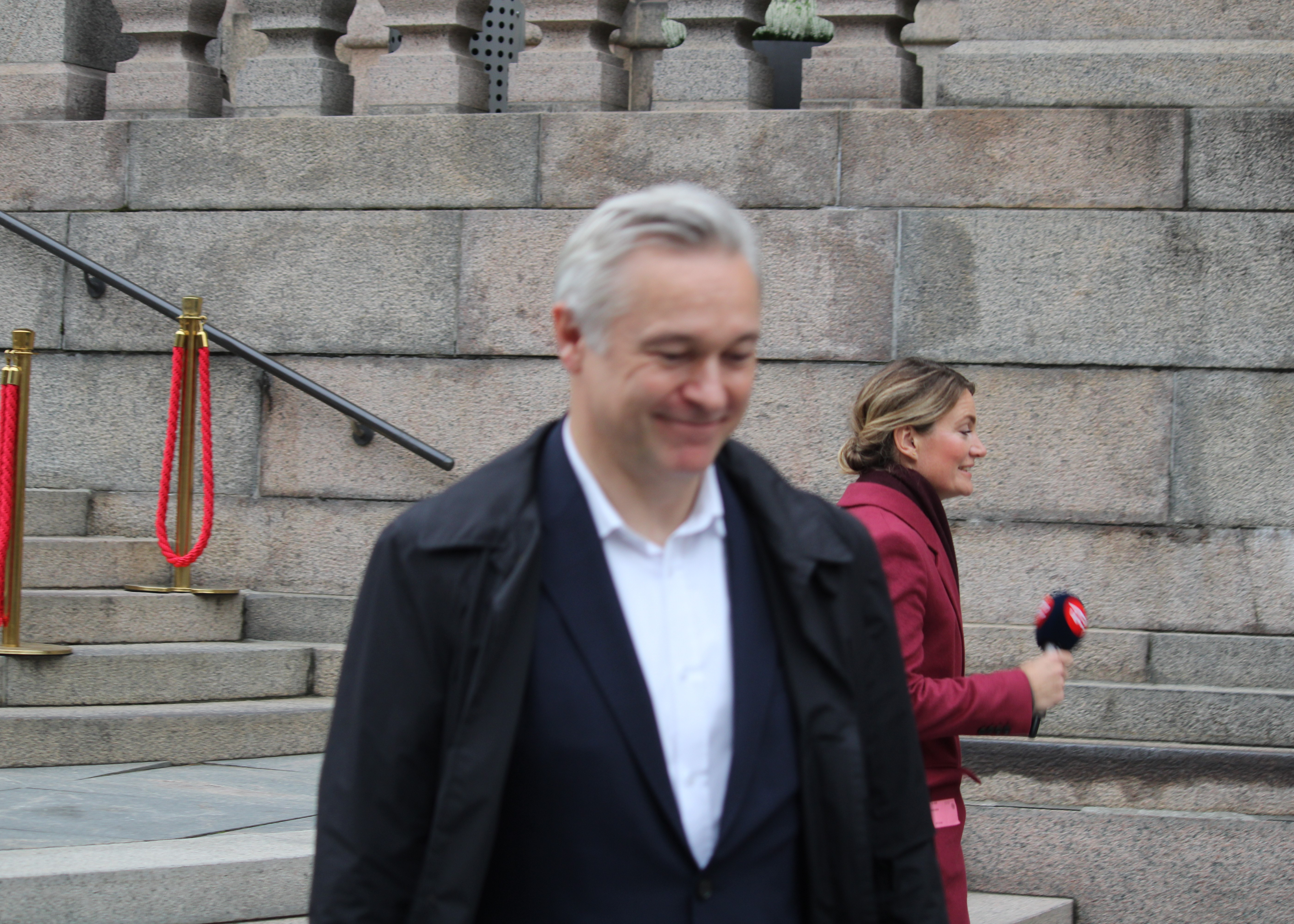
Jensen at the 2025 opening of parliament

Jensen was first elected into parliament in the 2007 election. He was reelected in the 2011, 2015 and 2019 elections.
