= Villadsen (surname) =

Villadsen is a Danish surname. Notable people with the surname include:

- Mai Villadsen (born 1991), Danish politician
- Thomas Villadsen (born 1984), Danish footballer
- Sofie F. Villadsen (born 1994), Danish politician
- Trine Villadsen (born 1995), Danish badminton player
