= Durhuus =

Durhuus is a surname. Notable people with the surname include:

- Jógvan Durhuus (1938–2026), Faroese politician
- Maria Durhuus (born 1977), Danish politician
