= Agersnap =

Agersnap is a surname. Notable people with the surname include:

- Harald Agersnap (1899–1982), Danish composer
- Sigurd Agersnap (born 1993), Danish politician
