= Greater Copenhagen (Folketing constituency) =

Constituency of the Folketing, the national legislature of Denmark

- Københavns Omegn
- Constituency for the Folketing
- Location of Greater Copenhagen within Denmark
- Municipality: List: Albertslund; Ballerup; Brøndby; Gentofte; Gladsaxe; Glostrup; Herlev; Høje-Taastrup; Hvidovre; Ishøj; Lyngby-Taarbæk; Rødovre; Vallensbæk
- Region: Capital
- Population: 590,106 (2026)
- Electorate: 376,921 (2026)
- Area: 342 km^{2} (2022)

Current constituency
- Created: 2007
- Seats: List: 11 (2015–present); 12 (2011–2015; 11 (2007–2011)
- Members of the Folketing: List: Sigurd Agersnap (F); Morten Bødskov (A); Jeppe Bruus (A); Maria Durhuus (A); Rasmus Jarlov (C); Kasper Sand Kjær (A); Steffen Larsen (I); Rasmus Lund-Nielsen (M); Morten Messerschmidt (O); Charlotte Munch (Æ); Sofie Carsten Nielsen (B); Monika Rubin (M); Søren Søndergaard (Ø); Mattias Tesfaye (A); Kim Valentin (V)
- Created from: Copenhagen County

Greater Copenhagen (Danish: Københavns Omegn) is one of the 12 multi-member constituencies of the Folketing, the national legislature of Denmark. The constituency was established in 2007 following the public administration structural reform. It consists of the municipalities of Albertslund, Ballerup, Brøndby, Gentofte, Gladsaxe, Glostrup, Herlev, Høje-Taastrup, Hvidovre, Ishøj, Lyngby-Taarbæk, Rødovre and Vallensbæk. The constituency currently elects 11 of the 179 members of the Folketing using the open party-list proportional representation electoral system. At the 2026 general election it had 376,921 registered electors.

== Electoral system ==
Greater Copenhagen currently elects 11 of the 179 members of the Folketing using the open party-list proportional representation electoral system. Constituency seats are allocated using the D'Hondt method. Compensatory seats are calculated based on the national vote and are allocated using the Sainte-Laguë method, initially at the provincial level and finally at the constituency level. Only parties that reach any one of three thresholds stipulated by section 77 of the Folketing (Parliamentary) Elections Act - winning at least one constituency seat; obtaining at least the Hare quota (valid votes in province/number of constituency seats in province) in two of the three provinces; or obtaining at least 2% of the national vote - compete for compensatory seats.

== Election results ==
=== Summary ===
| Election | Red–Green Ø | | | Green Left F | | | Alternative Å | | | Social Democrats A | | | Social Liberals B | | | Venstre V | | | Conservative People's C | | | Liberal Alliance I / Y | | | Danish People's O | | |
| Election | Votes | % | Seats | Votes | % | Seats | Votes | % | Seats | Votes | % | Seats | Votes | % | Seats | Votes | % | Seats | Votes | % | Seats | Votes | % | Seats | Votes | % | Seats |
|---|---|---|---|---|---|---|---|---|---|---|---|---|---|---|---|---|---|---|---|---|---|---|---|---|---|---|---|
| 2026 | 24,367 | 7.95% | 1 | 36,676 | 11.97% | 2 | 7,850 | 2.56% | 0 | 67,028 | 21.87% | 3 | 25,737 | 8.40% | 1 | 17,290 | 5.64% | 0 | 30,880 | 10.80% | 1 | 25,498 | 8.32% | 1 | 33,569 | 10.95% | 1 |
| 2022 | 16,188 | 5.37% | 0 | 28,681 | 9.52% | 1 | 8,992 | 2.99% | 0 | 83,264 | 27.64% | 5 | 15,266 | 5.07% | 0 | 30,791 | 10.22% | 1 | 21,778 | 7.23% | 1 | 24,172 | 8.03% | 1 | 11,026 | 3.66% | 0 |
| 2019 | 22,400 | 7.24% | 1 | 29,101 | 9.40% | 1 | 9,535 | 3.08% | 0 | 79,845 | 25.79% | 4 | 33,638 | 10.87% | 1 | 53,355 | 17.24% | 2 | 28,994 | 9.37% | 1 | 7,916 | 2.56% | 0 | 25,419 | 8.21% | 1 |
| 2015 | 25,364 | 8.16% | 1 | 14,619 | 4.70% | 0 | 13,575 | 4.37% | 0 | 90,361 | 29.07% | 4 | 16,710 | 5.38% | 0 | 46,092 | 14.83% | 2 | 13,840 | 4.45% | 0 | 25,982 | 8.36% | 1 | 62,419 | 20.08% | 3 |
| 2011 | 23,221 | 7.33% | 1 | 27,767 | 8.77% | 1 | | | | 81,557 | 25.75% | 4 | 33,992 | 10.73% | 1 | 69,948 | 22.08% | 3 | 21,763 | 6.87% | 1 | 16,703 | 5.27% | 0 | 40,444 | 12.77% | 1 |
| 2007 | 7,832 | 2.52% | 0 | 41,235 | 13.28% | 2 | | | | 85,821 | 27.64% | 4 | 17,075 | 5.50% | 0 | 60,395 | 19.45% | 2 | 40,897 | 13.17% | 1 | 10,294 | 3.32% | 0 | 45,440 | 14.63% | 2 |

=== Detailed ===
==== 2026 ====
Results of the 2026 general election held on 24 March 2026:

| Party | | Votes per nomination district | | | | | | | | Total Votes | % | Seats | | |
| Party | | Balle- rup | Brønd- by | Gen- tofte | Glad- saxe | Hvid- ovre | Lyngby | Rød- ovre | Taa- strup | Total Votes | % | Con. | Com. | Tot. |
|---|---|---|---|---|---|---|---|---|---|---|---|---|---|---|
| Social Democrats | A | 11,441 | 9,114 | 5,073 | 8,232 | 7,441 | 5,430 | 10,516 | 9,781 | 67,028 | 21.87% | 3 | 0 | 3 |
| Green Left | F | 5,232 | 3,824 | 2,747 | 5,567 | 4,295 | 4,105 | 5,305 | 5,295 | 36,676 | 11.97% | 2 | 0 | 2 |
| Danish People's Party | O | 5,731 | 5,453 | 2,507 | 3,459 | 3,833 | 2,225 | 4,818 | 5,543 | 33,569 | 10.95% | 1 | 1 | 2 |
| Conservative People's Party | C | 2,879 | 2,569 | 9,119 | 2,795 | 2,056 | 5,357 | 2,788 | 3,317 | 30,880 | 10.08% | 1 | 0 | 1 |
| Moderates | M | 3,266 | 2,882 | 6,168 | 3,245 | 2,224 | 4,102 | 3,026 | 2,885 | 27,798 | 9.07% | 1 | 0 | 0 |
| Danish Social Liberal Party | B | 2,678 | 2,848 | 4,482 | 3,784 | 1,950 | 4,135 | 2,599 | 3,261 | 25,737 | 8.40% | 1 | 0 | 1 |
| Liberal Alliance | I | 3,068 | 2,467 | 5,987 | 2,645 | 2,116 | 3,217 | 3,084 | 2,914 | 25,498 | 8.32% | 1 | 0 | 1 |
| Red–Green Alliance | Ø | 2,978 | 4,007 | 1,940 | 3,405 | 2,364 | 1,823 | 3,626 | 4,224 | 24,367 | 7.95% | 1 | 0 | 1 |
| Venstre | V | 2,014 | 2,899 | 1,505 | 2,049 | 1,087 | 2,309 | 1,651 | 1,608 | 17,290 | 5.64% | 0 | 1 | 1 |
| The Alternative | Å | 930 | 639 | 1,473 | 1,190 | 716 | 1,132 | 941 | 829 | 7,850 | 2.56% | 0 | 1 | 1 |
| Denmark Democrats | Æ | 803 | 952 | 327 | 548 | 581 | 285 | 685 | 1,025 | 5,206 | 1.70% | 0 | 0 | 0 |
| Citizens' Party | H | 787 | 662 | 359 | 482 | 492 | 261 | 750 | 768 | 4,561 | 1.49% | 0 | 0 | 0 |
| Valid votes | | 41,807 | 36,922 | 45,555 | 37,401 | 29,155 | 34,381 | 39,789 | 41,450 | 306,460 | 100.00% | 11 | 3 | 14 |
| Blank votes | | 510 | 369 | 248 | 362 | 326 | 266 | 463 | 501 | 3,045 | 0.98% | | | |
| Rejected votes – other | | 138 | 150 | 81 | 122 | 63 | 83 | 133 | 145 | 915 | 0.29% | | | |
| Total polled | | 42,455 | 37,441 | 45,884 | 37,885 | 29,544 | 34,730 | 40,385 | 42,096 | 310,420 | 82.36% | | | |
| Registered electors | | 52,282 | 48,817 | 51,327 | 45,500 | 36,117 | 39,538 | 49,840 | 53,500 | 376,921 | | | | |
| Turnout | | 81.20% | 76.70% | 89.40% | 83.26% | 81.80% | 87.84% | 81.03% | 78.68% | 82.36% | | | | |

The following candidates were elected:

- Constituency seats - Sigurd Agersnap (F), 3,546 votes; Ibrahim Benli (Ø), 5,230 votes; Mikkel Bjørn (O), 5,746 votes; Morten Bødskov (A), 5,643 votes; Sofie de Bretteville (A), 4,431 votes; Freja Brandhøj (I), 1,566 votes; Stinus Lindgreen (B), 2,837 votes; Monika Rubin (M), 4,633 votes; and Mattias Tesfaye (A), 11,898 votes; Christian Vigilius (C), 4,295 votes; Sofie F. Villadsen (F), 3,349 votes.
- Compensatory seats - Marie Brixtofte (V), 6,514 votes; Mikkel Dencker (O), 750 votes and Signe Wenneberg (Å), 3,349 votes.

==== 2022 ====
Results of the 2022 general election held on 1 November 2022:

| Party | | Votes per nomination district | | | | | | | | Total Votes | % | Seats | | |
| Party | | Balle- rup | Brønd- by | Gen- tofte | Glad- saxe | Hvid- ovre | Lyngby | Rød- ovre | Taa- strup | Total Votes | % | Con. | Com. | Tot. |
|---|---|---|---|---|---|---|---|---|---|---|---|---|---|---|
| Social Democrats | A | 14,164 | 11,908 | 5,717 | 10,387 | 9,335 | 6,551 | 12,830 | 12,372 | 83,264 | 27.64% | 5 | 0 | 5 |
| Moderates | M | 4,062 | 3,192 | 6,462 | 4,079 | 2,806 | 4,650 | 3,742 | 3,409 | 32,402 | 10.76% | 2 | 0 | 2 |
| Venstre | V | 3,885 | 2,899 | 7,526 | 3,570 | 2,330 | 4,390 | 3,102 | 3,089 | 30,791 | 10.22% | 1 | 0 | 1 |
| Green Left | F | 3,763 | 2,934 | 2,747 | 4,372 | 3,281 | 3,641 | 3,851 | 4,092 | 28,681 | 9.52% | 1 | 0 | 1 |
| Liberal Alliance | I | 2,745 | 2,097 | 6,449 | 2,745 | 1,762 | 3,575 | 2,431 | 2,368 | 24,172 | 8.03% | 1 | 0 | 1 |
| Conservative People's Party | C | 1,889 | 1,921 | 6,546 | 1,805 | 1,328 | 3,560 | 1,945 | 2,784 | 21,778 | 7.23% | 1 | 0 | 1 |
| Red–Green Alliance | Ø | 1,858 | 1,898 | 1,809 | 2,587 | 1,590 | 1,582 | 2,423 | 2,441 | 16,188 | 5.37% | 0 | 1 | 1 |
| Danish Social Liberal Party | B | 1,484 | 1,258 | 3,026 | 2,418 | 1,231 | 2,655 | 1,546 | 1,648 | 15,266 | 5.07% | 0 | 1 | 1 |
| Denmark Democrats | Æ | 1,882 | 1,953 | 747 | 1,171 | 1,331 | 619 | 1,624 | 2,030 | 11,357 | 3.77% | 0 | 1 | 1 |
| Danish People's Party | O | 1,813 | 1,747 | 906 | 1,205 | 1,358 | 743 | 1,550 | 1,704 | 11,026 | 3.66% | 0 | 1 | 1 |
| The Alternative | Å | 1,093 | 543 | 1,698 | 1,466 | 806 | 1,343 | 1,107 | 936 | 8,992 | 2.99% | 0 | 0 | 0 |
| The New Right | D | 1,367 | 1,324 | 930 | 914 | 906 | 739 | 1,212 | 1,426 | 8,818 | 2.93% | 0 | 0 | 0 |
| Independent Greens | Q | 697 | 2,041 | 200 | 668 | 701 | 208 | 854 | 1,580 | 6,949 | 2.31% | 0 | 0 | 0 |
| Christian Democrats | K | 160 | 194 | 93 | 130 | 97 | 74 | 195 | 186 | 1,129 | 0.37% | 0 | 0 | 0 |
| Jovan Tasevski (Independent) | | 46 | 45 | 32 | 42 | 34 | 34 | 41 | 37 | 311 | 0.10% | 0 | 0 | 0 |
| Henrik Vendelbo Petersen (Independent) | | 9 | 6 | 19 | 7 | 8 | 7 | 7 | 18 | 81 | 0.03% | 0 | 0 | 0 |
| Valid votes | | 40,917 | 35,960 | 44,907 | 37,566 | 28,904 | 34,371 | 38,460 | 40,120 | 301,205 | 100.00% | 11 | 4 | 15 |
| Blank votes | | 633 | 461 | 354 | 455 | 420 | 376 | 602 | 595 | 3,896 | 1.27% | | | |
| Rejected votes – other | | 214 | 206 | 106 | 131 | 74 | 94 | 138 | 205 | 1,168 | 0.38% | | | |
| Total polled | | 41,764 | 36,627 | 45,367 | 38,152 | 29,398 | 34,841 | 39,200 | 40,920 | 306,269 | 82.53% | | | |
| Registered electors | | 50,797 | 47,721 | 50,631 | 45,846 | 36,088 | 39,749 | 48,504 | 51,749 | 371,085 | | | | |
| Turnout | | 82.22% | 76.75% | 89.60% | 83.22% | 81.46% | 87.65% | 80.82% | 79.07% | 82.53% | | | | |

Votes per municipality:

| Party | | Votes per municipality | | | | | | | | | | | | | Total Votes |
| Party | | Alberts- lund | Balle- rup | Brønd- by | Gen- tofte | Glad- saxe | Glo- strup | Herlev | Høje- Taa- strup | Hvid- ovre | Ishøj | Lyngby- Taar- bæk | Rød- ovre | Vallens- bæk | Total Votes |
|---|---|---|---|---|---|---|---|---|---|---|---|---|---|---|---|
| Social Democrats | A | 4,627 | 9,939 | 6,364 | 5,717 | 10,387 | 4,225 | 5,336 | 7,745 | 9,335 | 3,242 | 6,551 | 7,494 | 2,302 | 83,264 |
| Moderates | M | 949 | 2,663 | 1,335 | 6,462 | 4,079 | 1,399 | 1,551 | 2,460 | 2,806 | 835 | 4,650 | 2,191 | 1,022 | 32,402 |
| Venstre | V | 700 | 2,527 | 1,238 | 7,526 | 3,570 | 1,358 | 1,300 | 2,389 | 2,330 | 779 | 4,390 | 1,802 | 882 | 30,791 |
| Green Left | F | 1,890 | 2,717 | 1,518 | 2,747 | 4,372 | 1,046 | 1,486 | 2,202 | 3,281 | 783 | 3,641 | 2,365 | 633 | 28,681 |
| Liberal Alliance | I | 612 | 1,772 | 915 | 6,449 | 2,745 | 973 | 988 | 1,756 | 1,762 | 525 | 3,575 | 1,443 | 657 | 24,172 |
| Conservative People's Party | C | 492 | 1,276 | 654 | 6,546 | 1,805 | 613 | 923 | 2,292 | 1,328 | 344 | 3,560 | 1,022 | 923 | 21,778 |
| Red–Green Alliance | Ø | 1,254 | 1,325 | 1,044 | 1,809 | 2,587 | 533 | 1,072 | 1,187 | 1,590 | 548 | 1,582 | 1,351 | 306 | 16,188 |
| Danish Social Liberal Party | B | 533 | 1,082 | 540 | 3,026 | 2,418 | 402 | 599 | 1,115 | 1,231 | 379 | 2,655 | 947 | 339 | 15,266 |
| Denmark Democrats | Æ | 542 | 1,231 | 917 | 747 | 1,171 | 651 | 687 | 1,488 | 1,331 | 604 | 619 | 937 | 432 | 11,357 |
| Danish People's Party | O | 570 | 1,181 | 905 | 906 | 1,205 | 632 | 544 | 1,134 | 1,358 | 518 | 743 | 1,006 | 324 | 11,026 |
| The Alternative | Å | 420 | 854 | 269 | 1,698 | 1,466 | 239 | 396 | 516 | 806 | 151 | 1,343 | 711 | 123 | 8,992 |
| The New Right | D | 409 | 909 | 682 | 930 | 914 | 458 | 535 | 1,017 | 906 | 384 | 739 | 677 | 258 | 8,818 |
| Independent Greens | Q | 665 | 405 | 987 | 200 | 668 | 292 | 278 | 915 | 701 | 755 | 208 | 576 | 299 | 6,949 |
| Christian Democrats | K | 62 | 117 | 103 | 93 | 130 | 43 | 91 | 124 | 97 | 55 | 74 | 104 | 36 | 1,129 |
| Jovan Tasevski (Independent) | | 19 | 39 | 28 | 32 | 42 | 7 | 16 | 18 | 34 | 14 | 34 | 25 | 3 | 311 |
| Henrik Vendelbo Petersen (Independent) | | 9 | 4 | 4 | 19 | 7 | 5 | 1 | 9 | 8 | 0 | 7 | 6 | 2 | 81 |
| Valid votes | | 13,753 | 28,041 | 17,503 | 44,907 | 37,566 | 12,876 | 15,803 | 26,367 | 28,904 | 9,916 | 34,371 | 22,657 | 8,541 | 301,205 |
| Blank votes | | 199 | 405 | 233 | 354 | 455 | 228 | 253 | 396 | 420 | 134 | 376 | 349 | 94 | 3,896 |
| Rejected votes – other | | 80 | 154 | 101 | 106 | 131 | 60 | 70 | 125 | 74 | 54 | 94 | 68 | 51 | 1,168 |
| Total polled | | 14,032 | 28,600 | 17,837 | 45,367 | 38,152 | 13,164 | 16,126 | 26,888 | 29,398 | 10,104 | 34,841 | 23,074 | 8,686 | 306,269 |
| Registered electors | | 17,931 | 34,571 | 23,562 | 50,631 | 45,846 | 16,226 | 19,961 | 33,818 | 36,088 | 13,666 | 39,749 | 28,543 | 10,493 | 371,085 |
| Turnout | | 78.26% | 82.73% | 75.70% | 89.60% | 83.22% | 81.13% | 80.79% | 79.51% | 81.46% | 73.94% | 87.65% | 80.84% | 82.78% | 82.53% |

The following candidates were elected:

- Constituency seats - Sigurd Agersnap (F), 2,857 votes; Morten Bødskov (A), 8,489 votes; Jeppe Bruus (A), 4,507 votes; Maria Durhuus (A), 2,616 votes; Karen Ellemann (V), 20,660 votes; Rasmus Jarlov (C), 5,216 votes; Steffen Larsen (I), 1,500 votes; Rasmus Lund-Nielsen (M), 1,874 votes; Monika Rubin (M), 3,376 votes; Søren Søndergaard (Ø), 2,930 votes; and Mattias Tesfaye (A), 13,948 votes.
- Compensatory seats - Morten Messerschmidt (O), 6,722 votes; Charlotte Munch (Æ) 648 votes; Sofie Carsten Nielsen (B), 2,467 votes; and Søren Søndergaard (Ø), 4,802 votes.

==== 2019 ====
Results of the 2019 general election held on 5 June 2019:

| Party | | Votes per nomination district | | | | | | | | Total Votes | % | Seats | | |
| Party | | Balle- rup | Brønd- by | Gen- tofte | Glad- saxe | Hvid- ovre | Lyngby | Rød- ovre | Taa- strup | Total Votes | % | Con. | Com. | Tot. |
|---|---|---|---|---|---|---|---|---|---|---|---|---|---|---|
| Social Democrats | A | 13,529 | 11,900 | 5,163 | 9,977 | 8,886 | 6,131 | 12,547 | 11,712 | 79,845 | 25.79% | 4 | 0 | 4 |
| Venstre | V | 6,977 | 5,778 | 11,300 | 6,260 | 4,518 | 6,776 | 5,803 | 5,943 | 53,355 | 17.24% | 2 | 1 | 3 |
| Danish Social Liberal Party | B | 3,165 | 4,002 | 6,586 | 4,869 | 2,666 | 5,235 | 3,330 | 3,785 | 33,638 | 10.87% | 1 | 1 | 2 |
| Socialist People's Party | F | 3,844 | 3,049 | 2,779 | 4,584 | 3,424 | 3,057 | 4,051 | 4,313 | 29,101 | 9.40% | 1 | 0 | 1 |
| Conservative People's Party | C | 2,422 | 2,441 | 9,226 | 2,543 | 1,532 | 5,209 | 2,331 | 3,290 | 28,994 | 9.37% | 1 | 0 | 1 |
| Danish People's Party | O | 4,441 | 4,121 | 1,617 | 2,787 | 3,298 | 1,518 | 3,545 | 4,092 | 25,419 | 8.21% | 1 | 0 | 1 |
| Red–Green Alliance | Ø | 2,759 | 2,616 | 2,300 | 3,424 | 2,389 | 2,051 | 3,414 | 3,447 | 22,400 | 7.24% | 1 | 0 | 1 |
| The Alternative | Å | 1,003 | 1,242 | 1,286 | 1,339 | 886 | 1,092 | 1,101 | 1,586 | 9,535 | 3.08% | 0 | 1 | 1 |
| Liberal Alliance | I | 946 | 609 | 2,138 | 965 | 533 | 1,244 | 774 | 707 | 7,916 | 2.56% | 0 | 0 | 0 |
| The New Right | D | 1,044 | 944 | 995 | 737 | 720 | 692 | 918 | 1,094 | 7,144 | 2.31% | 0 | 0 | 0 |
| Hard Line | P | 913 | 901 | 501 | 653 | 681 | 413 | 909 | 943 | 5,914 | 1.91% | 0 | 0 | 0 |
| Christian Democrats | K | 450 | 249 | 415 | 354 | 326 | 282 | 479 | 375 | 2,930 | 0.95% | 0 | 0 | 0 |
| Klaus Riskær Pedersen | E | 327 | 251 | 378 | 336 | 258 | 300 | 304 | 327 | 2,481 | 0.80% | 0 | 0 | 0 |
| Mads Palsvig (Independent) | | 108 | 84 | 105 | 89 | 100 | 79 | 138 | 123 | 826 | 0.27% | 0 | 0 | 0 |
| Christian B. Olesen (Independent) | | 13 | 21 | 1 | 4 | 7 | 1 | 5 | 7 | 59 | 0.02% | 0 | 0 | 0 |
| Valid votes | | 41,941 | 38,208 | 44,790 | 38,921 | 30,224 | 34,080 | 39,649 | 41,744 | 309,557 | 100.00% | 11 | 3 | 14 |
| Blank votes | | 381 | 287 | 213 | 292 | 244 | 206 | 328 | 362 | 2,313 | 0.74% | | | |
| Rejected votes – other | | 127 | 148 | 138 | 126 | 58 | 100 | 133 | 173 | 1,003 | 0.32% | | | |
| Total polled | | 42,449 | 38,643 | 45,141 | 39,339 | 30,526 | 34,386 | 40,110 | 42,279 | 312,873 | 84.48% | | | |
| Registered electors | | 50,432 | 47,714 | 50,722 | 46,498 | 36,674 | 39,002 | 48,274 | 51,055 | 370,371 | | | | |
| Turnout | | 84.17% | 80.99% | 89.00% | 84.60% | 83.24% | 88.16% | 83.09% | 82.81% | 84.48% | | | | |

Votes per municipality:

| Party | | Votes per municipality | | | | | | | | | | | | | Total Votes |
| Party | | Alberts- lund | Balle- rup | Brønd- by | Gen- tofte | Glad- saxe | Glo- strup | Herlev | Høje- Taa- strup | Hvid- ovre | Ishøj | Lyngby- Taar- bæk | Rød- ovre | Vallens- bæk | Total Votes |
|---|---|---|---|---|---|---|---|---|---|---|---|---|---|---|---|
| Social Democrats | A | 4,464 | 9,601 | 6,404 | 5,163 | 9,977 | 3,928 | 5,306 | 7,248 | 8,886 | 3,224 | 6,131 | 7,241 | 2,272 | 79,845 |
| Venstre | V | 1,520 | 4,511 | 2,426 | 11,300 | 6,260 | 2,466 | 2,499 | 4,423 | 4,518 | 1,518 | 6,776 | 3,304 | 1,834 | 53,355 |
| Danish Social Liberal Party | B | 1,379 | 2,193 | 1,755 | 6,586 | 4,869 | 972 | 1,323 | 2,406 | 2,666 | 1,357 | 5,235 | 2,007 | 890 | 33,638 |
| Socialist People's Party | F | 2,092 | 2,766 | 1,489 | 2,779 | 4,584 | 1,078 | 1,588 | 2,221 | 3,424 | 910 | 3,057 | 2,463 | 650 | 29,101 |
| Conservative People's Party | C | 620 | 1,643 | 765 | 9,226 | 2,543 | 779 | 1,063 | 2,670 | 1,532 | 397 | 5,209 | 1,268 | 1,279 | 28,994 |
| Danish People's Party | O | 1,225 | 2,898 | 2,070 | 1,617 | 2,787 | 1,543 | 1,416 | 2,867 | 3,298 | 1,219 | 1,518 | 2,129 | 832 | 25,419 |
| Red–Green Alliance | Ø | 1,832 | 2,001 | 1,406 | 2,300 | 3,424 | 758 | 1,424 | 1,615 | 2,389 | 782 | 2,051 | 1,990 | 428 | 22,400 |
| The Alternative | Å | 752 | 695 | 648 | 1,286 | 1,339 | 308 | 441 | 834 | 886 | 350 | 1,092 | 660 | 244 | 9,535 |
| Liberal Alliance | I | 201 | 647 | 238 | 2,138 | 965 | 299 | 324 | 506 | 533 | 154 | 1,244 | 450 | 217 | 7,916 |
| The New Right | D | 358 | 689 | 406 | 995 | 737 | 355 | 400 | 736 | 720 | 326 | 692 | 518 | 212 | 7,144 |
| Hard Line | P | 338 | 585 | 483 | 501 | 653 | 328 | 376 | 605 | 681 | 276 | 413 | 533 | 142 | 5,914 |
| Christian Democrats | K | 121 | 352 | 111 | 415 | 354 | 98 | 245 | 254 | 326 | 73 | 282 | 234 | 65 | 2,930 |
| Klaus Riskær Pedersen | E | 100 | 223 | 123 | 378 | 336 | 104 | 118 | 227 | 258 | 69 | 300 | 186 | 59 | 2,481 |
| Mads Palsvig (Independent) | | 40 | 75 | 51 | 105 | 89 | 33 | 57 | 83 | 100 | 16 | 79 | 81 | 17 | 826 |
| Christian B. Olesen (Independent) | | 4 | 7 | 18 | 1 | 4 | 6 | 2 | 3 | 7 | 0 | 1 | 3 | 3 | 59 |
| Valid votes | | 15,046 | 28,886 | 18,393 | 44,790 | 38,921 | 13,055 | 16,582 | 26,698 | 30,224 | 10,671 | 34,080 | 23,067 | 9,144 | 309,557 |
| Blank votes | | 142 | 259 | 138 | 213 | 292 | 122 | 151 | 220 | 244 | 80 | 206 | 177 | 69 | 2,313 |
| Rejected votes – other | | 66 | 74 | 79 | 138 | 126 | 53 | 64 | 107 | 58 | 34 | 100 | 69 | 35 | 1,003 |
| Total polled | | 15,254 | 29,219 | 18,610 | 45,141 | 39,339 | 13,230 | 16,797 | 27,025 | 30,526 | 10,785 | 34,386 | 23,313 | 9,248 | 312,873 |
| Registered electors | | 18,411 | 34,437 | 23,322 | 50,722 | 46,498 | 15,995 | 20,120 | 32,644 | 36,674 | 13,732 | 39,002 | 28,154 | 10,660 | 370,371 |
| Turnout | | 82.85% | 84.85% | 79.80% | 89.00% | 84.60% | 82.71% | 83.48% | 82.79% | 83.24% | 78.54% | 88.16% | 82.81% | 86.75% | 84.48% |

The following candidates were elected:

- Constituency seats - Morten Bødskov (A), 16,848 votes; Jeppe Bruus (A), 9,371 votes; Karen Ellemann (V), 23,226 votes; Mads Fuglede (V), 10,020 votes; Rasmus Jarlov (C), 19,694 votes; Kasper Sand Kjær (A), 6,749 votes; Pia Kjærsgaard (O), 9,953 votes; Sofie Carsten Nielsen (B), 8,955 votes; Søren Søndergaard (Ø), 4,701 votes; Ina Strøjer-Schmidt (F), 4,512 votes; and Mattias Tesfaye (A), 30,621 votes.
- Compensatory seats - Stinus Lindgreen (B), 1,746 votes; Sikandar Siddique (Å), 2,154 votes; and Kim Valentin (V), 9,649 votes.

==== 2015 ====
Results of the 2015 general election held on 18 June 2015:

| Party | | Votes per nomination district | | | | | | | | Total Votes | % | Seats | | |
| Party | | Balle- rup | Brønd- by | Gen- tofte | Glad- saxe | Hvid- ovre | Lyngby | Rød- ovre | Taa- strup | Total Votes | % | Con. | Com. | Tot. |
|---|---|---|---|---|---|---|---|---|---|---|---|---|---|---|
| Social Democrats | A | 14,696 | 12,648 | 7,850 | 11,629 | 9,738 | 7,904 | 13,200 | 12,696 | 90,361 | 29.07% | 4 | 0 | 4 |
| Danish People's Party | O | 10,326 | 9,901 | 4,722 | 6,817 | 7,764 | 4,188 | 8,666 | 10,035 | 62,419 | 20.08% | 3 | 0 | 3 |
| Venstre | V | 5,955 | 5,030 | 9,600 | 5,333 | 3,752 | 6,231 | 4,765 | 5,426 | 46,092 | 14.83% | 2 | 0 | 2 |
| Liberal Alliance | I | 2,570 | 2,152 | 7,876 | 2,997 | 1,738 | 4,239 | 2,184 | 2,226 | 25,982 | 8.36% | 1 | 0 | 1 |
| Red–Green Alliance | Ø | 3,260 | 2,962 | 2,327 | 3,895 | 2,827 | 2,235 | 3,741 | 4,117 | 25,364 | 8.16% | 1 | 0 | 1 |
| Danish Social Liberal Party | B | 1,484 | 1,275 | 4,083 | 2,632 | 1,112 | 3,048 | 1,488 | 1,588 | 16,710 | 5.38% | 0 | 1 | 1 |
| Socialist People's Party | F | 1,801 | 1,893 | 1,452 | 2,127 | 1,550 | 1,550 | 1,967 | 2,279 | 14,619 | 4.70% | 0 | 1 | 1 |
| Conservative People's Party | C | 1,008 | 1,129 | 4,553 | 1,225 | 730 | 2,360 | 1,151 | 1,684 | 13,840 | 4.45% | 0 | 1 | 1 |
| The Alternative | Å | 1,509 | 1,085 | 2,399 | 2,187 | 1,132 | 1,956 | 1,591 | 1,716 | 13,575 | 4.37% | 0 | 1 | 1 |
| Christian Democrats | K | 223 | 112 | 135 | 186 | 136 | 133 | 268 | 172 | 1,365 | 0.44% | 0 | 0 | 0 |
| Asif Ahmad (Independent) | | 37 | 102 | 15 | 32 | 104 | 19 | 33 | 63 | 405 | 0.13% | 0 | 0 | 0 |
| Christian Olesen (Independent) | | 12 | 30 | 7 | 3 | 7 | 2 | 7 | 12 | 80 | 0.03% | 0 | 0 | 0 |
| Valid votes | | 42,881 | 38,319 | 45,019 | 39,063 | 30,590 | 33,865 | 39,061 | 42,014 | 310,812 | 100.00% | 11 | 4 | 15 |
| Blank votes | | 395 | 261 | 284 | 352 | 253 | 285 | 354 | 403 | 2,587 | 0.82% | | | |
| Rejected votes – other | | 120 | 169 | 108 | 98 | 53 | 86 | 128 | 188 | 950 | 0.30% | | | |
| Total polled | | 43,396 | 38,749 | 45,411 | 39,513 | 30,896 | 34,236 | 39,543 | 42,605 | 314,349 | 85.30% | | | |
| Registered electors | | 50,639 | 47,598 | 50,915 | 46,261 | 36,798 | 38,547 | 46,721 | 51,027 | 368,506 | | | | |
| Turnout | | 85.70% | 81.41% | 89.19% | 85.41% | 83.96% | 88.82% | 84.64% | 83.50% | 85.30% | | | | |

Votes per municipality:

| Party | | Votes per municipality | | | | | | | | | | | | | Total Votes |
| Party | | Alberts- lund | Balle- rup | Brønd- by | Gen- tofte | Glad- saxe | Glo- strup | Herlev | Høje- Taa- strup | Hvid- ovre | Ishøj | Lyngby- Taar- bæk | Rød- ovre | Vallens- bæk | Total Votes |
|---|---|---|---|---|---|---|---|---|---|---|---|---|---|---|---|
| Social Democrats | A | 4,836 | 10,487 | 6,635 | 7,850 | 11,629 | 4,209 | 5,610 | 7,860 | 9,738 | 3,612 | 7,904 | 7,590 | 2,401 | 90,361 |
| Danish People's Party | O | 3,116 | 6,767 | 5,013 | 4,722 | 6,817 | 3,559 | 3,627 | 6,919 | 7,764 | 2,845 | 4,188 | 5,039 | 2,043 | 62,419 |
| Venstre | V | 1,274 | 3,867 | 2,117 | 9,600 | 5,333 | 2,088 | 2,094 | 4,152 | 3,752 | 1,279 | 6,231 | 2,671 | 1,634 | 46,092 |
| Liberal Alliance | I | 597 | 1,711 | 839 | 7,876 | 2,997 | 859 | 948 | 1,629 | 1,738 | 495 | 4,239 | 1,236 | 818 | 25,982 |
| Red–Green Alliance | Ø | 2,201 | 2,278 | 1,691 | 2,327 | 3,895 | 982 | 1,569 | 1,916 | 2,827 | 821 | 2,235 | 2,172 | 450 | 25,364 |
| Danish Social Liberal Party | B | 638 | 1,060 | 610 | 4,083 | 2,632 | 424 | 604 | 950 | 1,112 | 318 | 3,048 | 884 | 347 | 16,710 |
| Socialist People's Party | F | 1,098 | 1,296 | 870 | 1,452 | 2,127 | 505 | 815 | 1,181 | 1,550 | 663 | 1,550 | 1,152 | 360 | 14,619 |
| Conservative People's Party | C | 339 | 674 | 309 | 4,553 | 1,225 | 334 | 540 | 1,345 | 730 | 187 | 2,360 | 611 | 633 | 13,840 |
| The Alternative | Å | 806 | 1,087 | 557 | 2,399 | 2,187 | 422 | 650 | 910 | 1,132 | 317 | 1,956 | 941 | 211 | 13,575 |
| Christian Democrats | K | 63 | 176 | 55 | 135 | 186 | 47 | 141 | 109 | 136 | 31 | 133 | 127 | 26 | 1,365 |
| Asif Ahmad (Independent) | | 32 | 18 | 61 | 15 | 32 | 19 | 12 | 31 | 104 | 29 | 19 | 21 | 12 | 405 |
| Christian Olesen (Independent) | | 7 | 2 | 27 | 7 | 3 | 10 | 3 | 5 | 7 | 2 | 2 | 4 | 1 | 80 |
| Valid votes | | 15,007 | 29,423 | 18,784 | 45,019 | 39,063 | 13,458 | 16,613 | 27,007 | 30,590 | 10,599 | 33,865 | 22,448 | 8,936 | 310,812 |
| Blank votes | | 135 | 290 | 133 | 284 | 352 | 105 | 166 | 268 | 253 | 67 | 285 | 188 | 61 | 2,587 |
| Rejected votes – other | | 99 | 81 | 76 | 108 | 98 | 39 | 37 | 89 | 53 | 49 | 86 | 91 | 44 | 950 |
| Total polled | | 15,241 | 29,794 | 18,993 | 45,411 | 39,513 | 13,602 | 16,816 | 27,364 | 30,896 | 10,715 | 34,236 | 22,727 | 9,041 | 314,349 |
| Registered electors | | 18,301 | 34,508 | 23,764 | 50,915 | 46,261 | 16,131 | 19,748 | 32,726 | 36,798 | 13,493 | 38,547 | 26,973 | 10,341 | 368,506 |
| Turnout | | 83.28% | 86.34% | 79.92% | 89.19% | 85.41% | 84.32% | 85.15% | 83.62% | 83.96% | 79.41% | 88.82% | 84.26% | 87.43% | 85.30% |

The following candidates were elected:

- Constituency seats - Kenneth Kristensen Berth (O), 2,542 votes; Morten Bødskov (A), 10,496 votes; Mikkel Dencker (O), 2,893 votes; Karen Ellemann (V), 17,276 votes; Mette Frederiksen (A), 42,676 votes; Pia Kjærsgaard (O), 50,397 votes; Morten Løkkegaard (V), 11,409 votes; Mogens Lykketoft (A), 12,106 votes; Joachim B. Olsen (I), 13,120 votes; Søren Søndergaard (Ø), 5,632 votes; and Mattias Tesfaye (A), 14,957 votes.
- Compensatory seats - Rasmus Jarlov (C), 6,362 votes; Holger K. Nielsen (F), 3,723 votes; Sofie Carsten Nielsen (B), 10,163 votes; and Ulla Sandbæk (Å), 4,278 votes.

==== 2011 ====
Results of the 2011 general election held on 15 September 2011:

| Party | | Votes per nomination district | | | | | | | | Total Votes | % | Seats | | |
| Party | | Balle- rup | Brønd- by | Gen- tofte | Glad- saxe | Hvid- ovre | Lyngby | Rød- ovre | Taa- strup | Total Votes | % | Con. | Com. | Tot. |
|---|---|---|---|---|---|---|---|---|---|---|---|---|---|---|
| Social Democrats | A | 13,919 | 11,976 | 5,342 | 10,329 | 8,886 | 6,141 | 12,413 | 12,551 | 81,557 | 25.75% | 4 | 0 | 4 |
| Venstre | V | 8,959 | 8,110 | 13,877 | 8,064 | 5,872 | 8,989 | 7,308 | 8,769 | 69,948 | 22.08% | 3 | 0 | 3 |
| Danish People's Party | O | 6,599 | 6,397 | 3,099 | 4,609 | 5,121 | 2,815 | 5,649 | 6,155 | 40,444 | 12.77% | 1 | 1 | 2 |
| Danish Social Liberal Party | B | 3,606 | 3,085 | 6,787 | 5,043 | 2,620 | 5,420 | 3,478 | 3,953 | 33,992 | 10.73% | 1 | 1 | 2 |
| Socialist People's Party | F | 3,661 | 3,871 | 2,142 | 3,855 | 3,213 | 2,740 | 3,897 | 4,388 | 27,767 | 8.77% | 1 | 0 | 1 |
| Red–Green Alliance | Ø | 2,962 | 2,716 | 2,299 | 3,667 | 2,652 | 2,015 | 3,226 | 3,684 | 23,221 | 7.33% | 1 | 0 | 1 |
| Conservative People's Party | C | 2,024 | 2,020 | 6,755 | 2,162 | 1,298 | 3,275 | 1,884 | 2,345 | 21,763 | 6.87% | 1 | 0 | 1 |
| Liberal Alliance | I | 1,858 | 1,478 | 4,599 | 1,890 | 1,204 | 2,591 | 1,486 | 1,597 | 16,703 | 5.27% | 0 | 1 | 1 |
| Christian Democrats | K | 156 | 103 | 116 | 148 | 106 | 103 | 222 | 132 | 1,086 | 0.34% | 0 | 0 | 0 |
| Christian H. Hansen (Independent) | | 51 | 28 | 17 | 31 | 30 | 15 | 31 | 44 | 247 | 0.08% | 0 | 0 | 0 |
| Valid votes | | 43,795 | 39,784 | 45,033 | 39,798 | 31,002 | 34,104 | 39,594 | 43,618 | 316,728 | 100.00% | 12 | 3 | 15 |
| Blank votes | | 303 | 245 | 201 | 318 | 232 | 212 | 307 | 274 | 2,092 | 0.65% | | | |
| Rejected votes – other | | 139 | 205 | 162 | 99 | 65 | 93 | 123 | 199 | 1,085 | 0.34% | | | |
| Total polled | | 44,237 | 40,234 | 45,396 | 40,215 | 31,299 | 34,409 | 40,024 | 44,091 | 319,905 | 88.09% | | | |
| Registered electors | | 50,164 | 46,901 | 49,736 | 45,597 | 36,028 | 38,043 | 45,921 | 50,753 | 363,143 | | | | |
| Turnout | | 88.18% | 85.78% | 91.27% | 88.20% | 86.87% | 90.45% | 87.16% | 86.87% | 88.09% | | | | |

Votes per municipality:

| Party | | Votes per municipality | | | | | | | | | | | | | Total Votes |
| Party | | Alberts- lund | Balle- rup | Brønd- by | Gen- tofte | Glad- saxe | Glo- strup | Herlev | Høje- Taa- strup | Hvid- ovre | Ishøj | Lyngby- Taar- bæk | Rød- ovre | Vallens- bæk | Total Votes |
|---|---|---|---|---|---|---|---|---|---|---|---|---|---|---|---|
| Social Democrats | A | 4,823 | 9,950 | 6,455 | 5,342 | 10,329 | 3,969 | 5,143 | 7,728 | 8,886 | 3,530 | 6,141 | 7,270 | 1,991 | 81,557 |
| Venstre | V | 2,102 | 5,819 | 3,446 | 13,877 | 8,064 | 3,140 | 3,096 | 6,667 | 5,872 | 2,176 | 8,989 | 4,212 | 2,488 | 69,948 |
| Danish People's Party | O | 1,984 | 4,295 | 3,348 | 3,099 | 4,609 | 2,304 | 2,287 | 4,171 | 5,121 | 1,774 | 2,815 | 3,362 | 1,275 | 40,444 |
| Danish Social Liberal Party | B | 1,433 | 2,548 | 1,463 | 6,787 | 5,043 | 1,058 | 1,425 | 2,520 | 2,620 | 809 | 5,420 | 2,053 | 813 | 33,992 |
| Socialist People's Party | F | 2,148 | 2,534 | 2,084 | 2,142 | 3,855 | 1,127 | 1,636 | 2,240 | 3,213 | 1,166 | 2,740 | 2,261 | 621 | 27,767 |
| Red–Green Alliance | Ø | 2,077 | 2,096 | 1,569 | 2,299 | 3,667 | 866 | 1,364 | 1,607 | 2,652 | 822 | 2,015 | 1,862 | 325 | 23,221 |
| Conservative People's Party | C | 547 | 1,385 | 678 | 6,755 | 2,162 | 639 | 872 | 1,798 | 1,298 | 380 | 3,275 | 1,012 | 962 | 21,763 |
| Liberal Alliance | I | 447 | 1,283 | 648 | 4,599 | 1,890 | 575 | 648 | 1,150 | 1,204 | 384 | 2,591 | 838 | 446 | 16,703 |
| Christian Democrats | K | 43 | 112 | 59 | 116 | 148 | 44 | 129 | 89 | 106 | 23 | 103 | 93 | 21 | 1,086 |
| Christian H. Hansen (Independent) | | 14 | 39 | 15 | 17 | 31 | 12 | 12 | 30 | 30 | 10 | 15 | 19 | 3 | 247 |
| Valid votes | | 15,618 | 30,061 | 19,765 | 45,033 | 39,798 | 13,734 | 16,612 | 28,000 | 31,002 | 11,074 | 34,104 | 22,982 | 8,945 | 316,728 |
| Blank votes | | 97 | 215 | 122 | 201 | 318 | 88 | 138 | 177 | 232 | 74 | 212 | 169 | 49 | 2,092 |
| Rejected votes – other | | 94 | 79 | 94 | 162 | 99 | 60 | 62 | 105 | 65 | 76 | 93 | 61 | 35 | 1,085 |
| Total polled | | 15,809 | 30,355 | 19,981 | 45,396 | 40,215 | 13,882 | 16,812 | 28,282 | 31,299 | 11,224 | 34,409 | 23,212 | 9,029 | 319,905 |
| Registered electors | | 18,173 | 34,263 | 23,673 | 49,736 | 45,597 | 15,901 | 19,196 | 32,580 | 36,028 | 13,254 | 38,043 | 26,725 | 9,974 | 363,143 |
| Turnout | | 86.99% | 88.59% | 84.40% | 91.27% | 88.20% | 87.30% | 87.58% | 86.81% | 86.87% | 84.68% | 90.45% | 86.86% | 90.53% | 88.09% |

The following candidates were elected:

- Constituency seats - Frank Aaen (Ø), 6,520 votes; Sophie Hæstorp Andersen (A), 5,977 votes; Gitte Lillelund Bech (V), 20,978 votes; Morten Bødskov (A), 10,307 votes; Karen Ellemann (V), 25,350 votes; Søren Espersen (O), 20,053 votes; Mette Frederiksen (A), 36,783 votes; Benedikte Kiær (C), 10,641 votes; Mogens Lykketoft (A), 16,208 votes; Holger K. Nielsen (F), 5,950 votes; Sofie Carsten Nielsen (B), 10,199 votes; and Eyvind Vesselbo (V), 7,048 votes.
- Compensatory seats - Mikkel Dencker (O), 5,780 votes; Nadeem Farooq (B), 8,668 votes; and Joachim B. Olsen (I), 7,767 votes.

==== 2007 ====
Results of the 2007 general election held on 13 November 2007:

| Party | | Votes per nomination district | | | | | | | | Total Votes | % | Seats | | |
| Party | | Balle- rup | Brønd- by | Gen- tofte | Glad- saxe | Hvid- ovre | Lyngby | Rød- ovre | Taa- strup | Total Votes | % | Con. | Com. | Tot. |
|---|---|---|---|---|---|---|---|---|---|---|---|---|---|---|
| Social Democrats | A | 14,933 | 12,135 | 5,938 | 10,780 | 9,371 | 6,782 | 13,044 | 12,838 | 85,821 | 27.64% | 4 | 0 | 4 |
| Venstre | V | 7,709 | 7,053 | 11,085 | 7,164 | 5,255 | 7,513 | 6,442 | 8,174 | 60,395 | 19.45% | 2 | 1 | 3 |
| Danish People's Party | O | 7,252 | 7,172 | 3,420 | 5,192 | 5,751 | 3,261 | 6,474 | 6,918 | 45,440 | 14.63% | 2 | 0 | 2 |
| Socialist People's Party | F | 5,304 | 5,199 | 3,851 | 6,077 | 4,468 | 4,040 | 5,750 | 6,546 | 41,235 | 13.28% | 2 | 0 | 2 |
| Conservative People's Party | C | 4,135 | 3,868 | 12,080 | 4,144 | 2,492 | 6,269 | 3,641 | 4,268 | 40,897 | 13.17% | 1 | 1 | 2 |
| Danish Social Liberal Party | B | 1,659 | 1,434 | 3,477 | 2,622 | 1,282 | 2,976 | 1,742 | 1,883 | 17,075 | 5.50% | 0 | 1 | 1 |
| New Alliance | Y | 1,074 | 966 | 2,399 | 1,420 | 784 | 1,601 | 923 | 1,127 | 10,294 | 3.32% | 0 | 0 | 0 |
| Unity List | Ø | 813 | 819 | 1,038 | 1,312 | 840 | 779 | 985 | 1,246 | 7,832 | 2.52% | 0 | 1 | 1 |
| Christian Democrats | K | 173 | 162 | 170 | 196 | 153 | 152 | 299 | 182 | 1,487 | 0.48% | 0 | 0 | 0 |
| Jes Krogh (Independent) | | 4 | 10 | 0 | 1 | 5 | 2 | 2 | 6 | 30 | 0.01% | 0 | 0 | 0 |
| Feride Istogu Gillesberg (Independent) | | 1 | 2 | 0 | 1 | 1 | 4 | 0 | 0 | 9 | 0.00% | 0 | 0 | 0 |
| Valid votes | | 43,057 | 38,820 | 43,458 | 38,909 | 30,402 | 33,379 | 39,302 | 43,188 | 310,515 | 100.00% | 11 | 4 | 15 |
| Blank votes | | 203 | 179 | 123 | 173 | 133 | 124 | 189 | 237 | 1,361 | 0.44% | | | |
| Rejected votes – other | | 114 | 174 | 90 | 67 | 55 | 92 | 68 | 123 | 783 | 0.25% | | | |
| Total polled | | 43,374 | 39,173 | 43,671 | 39,149 | 30,590 | 33,595 | 39,559 | 43,548 | 312,659 | 87.30% | | | |
| Registered electors | | 49,372 | 45,752 | 48,563 | 44,784 | 35,591 | 37,573 | 45,860 | 50,651 | 358,146 | | | | |
| Turnout | | 87.85% | 85.62% | 89.93% | 87.42% | 85.95% | 89.41% | 86.26% | 85.98% | 87.30% | | | | |

Votes per municipality:

| Party | | Votes per municipality | | | | | | | | | | | | | Total Votes |
| Party | | Alberts- lund | Balle- rup | Brønd- by | Gen- tofte | Glad- saxe | Glo- strup | Herlev | Høje- Taa- strup | Hvid- ovre | Ishøj | Lyngby- Taar- bæk | Rød- ovre | Vallens- bæk | Total Votes |
|---|---|---|---|---|---|---|---|---|---|---|---|---|---|---|---|
| Social Democrats | A | 4,944 | 10,760 | 6,711 | 5,938 | 10,780 | 4,173 | 5,437 | 7,894 | 9,371 | 3,538 | 6,782 | 7,607 | 1,886 | 85,821 |
| Venstre | V | 1,958 | 5,011 | 3,293 | 11,085 | 7,164 | 2,698 | 2,699 | 6,216 | 5,255 | 1,952 | 7,513 | 3,743 | 1,808 | 60,395 |
| Danish People's Party | O | 2,283 | 4,836 | 3,737 | 3,420 | 5,192 | 2,416 | 2,599 | 4,635 | 5,751 | 2,177 | 3,261 | 3,875 | 1,258 | 45,440 |
| Socialist People's Party | F | 3,330 | 3,715 | 3,005 | 3,851 | 6,077 | 1,589 | 2,413 | 3,216 | 4,468 | 1,526 | 4,040 | 3,337 | 668 | 41,235 |
| Conservative People's Party | C | 1,059 | 2,778 | 1,465 | 12,080 | 4,144 | 1,357 | 1,688 | 3,209 | 2,492 | 752 | 6,269 | 1,953 | 1,651 | 40,897 |
| Danish Social Liberal Party | B | 714 | 1,162 | 728 | 3,477 | 2,622 | 497 | 722 | 1,169 | 1,282 | 354 | 2,976 | 1,020 | 352 | 17,075 |
| New Alliance | Y | 335 | 758 | 472 | 2,399 | 1,420 | 316 | 405 | 792 | 784 | 262 | 1,601 | 518 | 232 | 10,294 |
| Unity List | Ø | 815 | 586 | 483 | 1,038 | 1,312 | 227 | 408 | 431 | 840 | 252 | 779 | 577 | 84 | 7,832 |
| Christian Democrats | K | 58 | 121 | 91 | 170 | 196 | 52 | 186 | 124 | 153 | 40 | 152 | 113 | 31 | 1,487 |
| Jes Krogh (Independent) | | 2 | 4 | 5 | 0 | 1 | 0 | 0 | 4 | 5 | 2 | 2 | 2 | 3 | 30 |
| Feride Istogu Gillesberg (Independent) | | 0 | 0 | 2 | 0 | 1 | 1 | 0 | 0 | 1 | 0 | 4 | 0 | 0 | 9 |
| Valid votes | | 15,498 | 29,731 | 19,992 | 43,458 | 38,909 | 13,326 | 16,557 | 27,690 | 30,402 | 10,855 | 33,379 | 22,745 | 7,973 | 310,515 |
| Blank votes | | 78 | 146 | 93 | 123 | 173 | 57 | 84 | 159 | 133 | 53 | 124 | 105 | 33 | 1,361 |
| Rejected votes – other | | 57 | 72 | 74 | 90 | 67 | 42 | 29 | 66 | 55 | 65 | 92 | 39 | 35 | 783 |
| Total polled | | 15,633 | 29,949 | 20,159 | 43,671 | 39,149 | 13,425 | 16,670 | 27,915 | 30,590 | 10,973 | 33,595 | 22,889 | 8,041 | 312,659 |
| Registered electors | | 18,145 | 33,886 | 23,827 | 48,563 | 44,784 | 15,486 | 19,189 | 32,506 | 35,591 | 13,102 | 37,573 | 26,671 | 8,823 | 358,146 |
| Turnout | | 86.16% | 88.38% | 84.61% | 89.93% | 87.42% | 86.69% | 86.87% | 85.88% | 85.95% | 83.75% | 89.41% | 85.82% | 91.14% | 87.30% |

The following candidates were elected:

- Constituency seats - Hanne Agersnap (F), 4,398 votes; Sophie Hæstorp Andersen (A), 6,349 votes; Morten Bødskov (A), 8,918 votes; Mikkel Dencker (O), 6,544 votes; Karen Ellemann (V), 13,513 votes; Søren Espersen (O), 21,465 votes; Mette Frederiksen (A), 47,834 votes; Bertel Haarder (V), 32,354 votes; Connie Hedegaard (C), 33,328 votes; Mogens Lykketoft (A), 14,087 votes; and Holger K. Nielsen (F), 10,432 votes.
- Compensatory seats - Frank Aaen (Ø), 3,176 votes; Gitte Lillelund Bech (V), 4,088 votes; Charlotte Dyremose (C), 3,240 votes; and Morten Helveg Petersen (B), 7,732 votes.
