= Steffen Larsen =

Danish politician

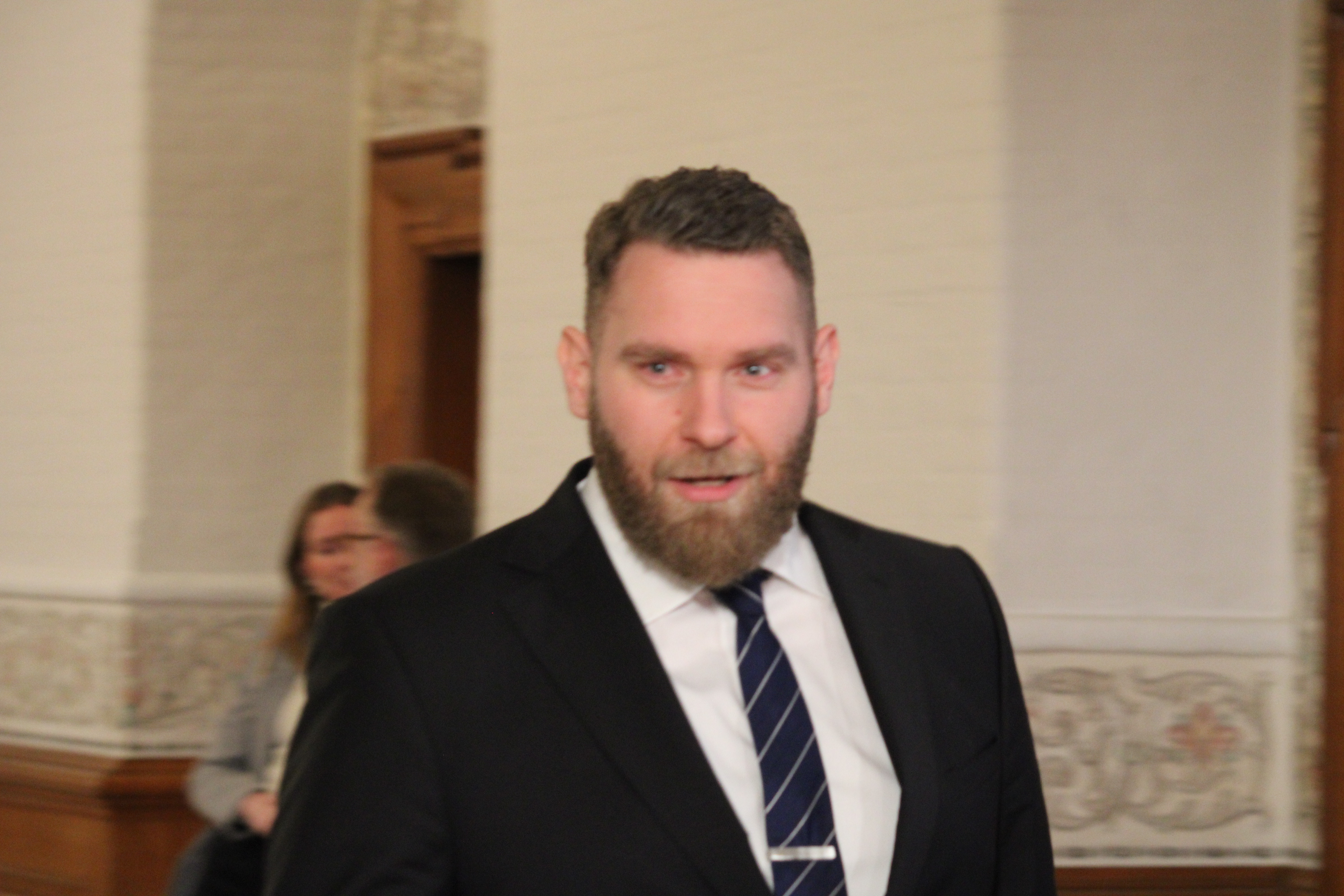
- Larsen in 2025

Member of the Folketing
- Incumbent
- Assumed office 1 November 2022
- Constituency: Greater Copenhagen

Personal details
- Born: 5 December 1983 (age 42) Kolding, Denmark
- Party: Liberal Alliance

Steffen Larsen (born 5 December 1983) is a Danish politician, who is a member of the Folketing for the Liberal Alliance. He was elected into the Folketing in the 2022 Danish general election.
