= Rasmus Jarlov =

Danish politician

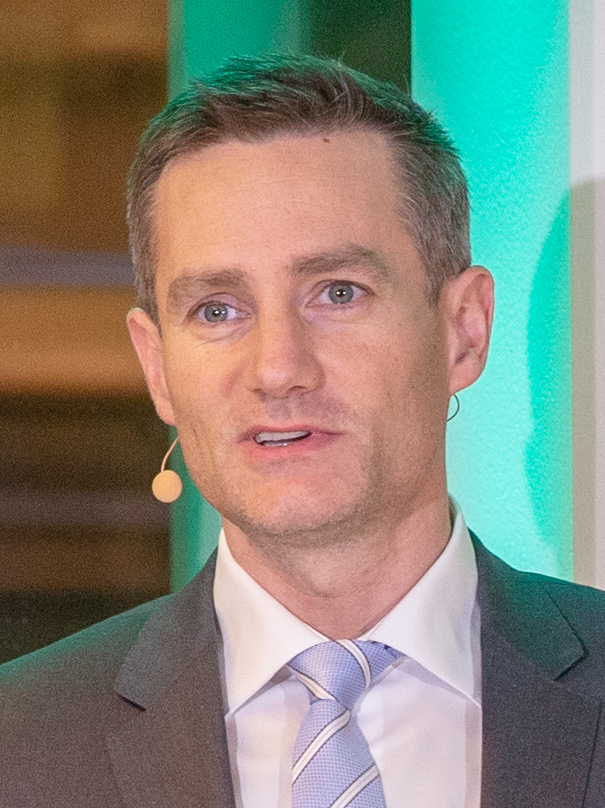
- Jarlov in 2018

Member of the Folketing
- Incumbent
- Assumed office 18 June 2015
- Constituency: Greater Copenhagen
- In office 1 September 2010 – 15 September 2011
- Constituency: Greater Copenhagen

Minister of Business Affairs
- In office 20 June 2018 – 27 June 2019
- Prime Minister: Lars Løkke Rasmussen

Personal details
- Born: 29 April 1977 (age 49) Aarhus, Denmark
- Party: Conservative People's Party

Rasmus Jarlov (born 29 April 1977) is a Danish politician, who is a member of the Folketing for the Conservative People's Party and a former cabinet minister. He was elected into parliament at the 2015 Danish general election, and formerly sat from 2010 to 2011. He is currently chairman of the Defence Committee. He served as Minister of Business Affairs in the third cabinet of Lars Løkke Rasmussen.

== Political career ==
Jarlov was a temporary member of parliament from 12 January 2010 to 31 August 2010, acting as substitute for Charlotte Dyremose. On 1 September 2010 Henrik Rasmussen resigned his seat and Jarlov took over the seat. He sat in parliament for the remainder of the term. He was elected into parliament again at the 2015 election. From 2018 to 2019 he was Minister of Business Affairs.

In the 2025 Danish municipal elections, Jarlov ran for mayor of Roskilde Municipality after having announced that he would not stand in the next Danish general election. He lost the mayoral race despite receiving the highest number of personal votes, as he failed to secure the backing of a majority of local councillors. The incumbent mayor from the Social Democrats, Tomas Breddam, will continue as mayor for the period 2026-2030.

Political offices
Preceded by Brian Mikkelsen	Minister of Business Affairs; 2018 – 2019	Succeeded by Simon Kollerup
