= Taastrup (nomination district) =

- Taastrup
- Nomination district constituency for the Folketing
- Location of Taastrup within Greater Copenhagen

- Location of Greater Copenhagen within Denmark
- Municipalities: Albertslund; Høje-Taastrup
- Constituency: Greater Copenhagen
- Electorate: 51,749 (2022)

Current constituency
- Created: 2007

Taastrup nominating district is one of the 92 nominating districts that was created for Danish elections following the 2007 municipal reform. It consists of Albertslund and Høje-Taastrup municipality.

In general elections, the district is a strong area for parties commonly associated with the red bloc.

== General elections results ==
=== General elections in the 2020s ===
2022 Danish general election

Parties	Vote		
Parties	Votes	%	+ / -
Social Democrats	12,372	30.84	+2.78
Green Left	4,092	10.20	-0.13
Moderates	3,409	8.50	New
Venstre	3,089	7.70	-6.54
Conservatives	2,784	6.94	-0.94
Red–Green Alliance	2,441	6.08	-2.18
Liberal Alliance	2,368	5.90	+4.21
Denmark Democrats	2,030	5.06	New
Danish People's Party	1,704	4.25	-5.55
Social Liberals	1,648	4.11	-4.96
Independent Greens	1,580	3.94	New
New Right	1,426	3.55	+0.93
The Alternative	936	2.33	-1.47
Christian Democrats	186	0.46	-0.44
Jovan Tasevski	37	0.09	New
Henrik Vendelbo Petersen	18	0.04	New
Total	40,120		

=== General elections in the 2010s ===
2019 Danish general election

Parties	Vote		
Parties	Votes	%	+ / -
Social Democrats	11,712	28.06	-2.16
Venstre	5,943	14.24	+1.33
Green Left	4,313	10.33	+4.91
Danish People's Party	4,092	9.80	-14.08
Social Liberals	3,785	9.07	+5.29
Red–Green Alliance	3,447	8.26	-1.54
Conservatives	3,290	7.88	+3.87
The Alternative	1,586	3.80	-0.28
New Right	1,094	2.62	New
Stram Kurs	943	2.26	New
Liberal Alliance	707	1.69	-3.61
Christian Democrats	375	0.90	+0.49
Klaus Riskær Pedersen Party	327	0.78	New
Mads Palsvig	123	0.29	New
Christian B. Olesen	7	0.02	New
Total	41,744		

2015 Danish general election

Parties	Vote		
Parties	Votes	%	+ / -
Social Democrats	12,696	30.22	+1.45
Danish People's Party	10,035	23.88	+9.77
Venstre	5,426	12.91	-7.19
Red–Green Alliance	4,117	9.80	+1.35
Green Left	2,279	5.42	-4.64
Liberal Alliance	2,226	5.30	+1.64
The Alternative	1,716	4.08	New
Conservatives	1,684	4.01	-1.37
Social Liberals	1,588	3.78	-5.28
Christian Democrats	172	0.41	+0.11
Asif Ahmad	63	0.15	New
Christian Olesen	12	0.03	New
Total	42,014		

2011 Danish general election

Parties	Vote		
Parties	Votes	%	+ / -
Social Democrats	12,551	28.77	-0.96
Venstre	8,769	20.10	+1.17
Danish People's Party	6,155	14.11	-1.91
Green Left	4,388	10.06	-5.10
Social Liberals	3,953	9.06	+4.70
Red–Green Alliance	3,684	8.45	+5.56
Conservatives	2,345	5.38	-4.50
Liberal Alliance	1,597	3.66	+1.05
Christian Democrats	132	0.30	-0.12
Christian H. Hansen	44	0.10	New
Total	43,618		

=== General elections in the 2000s ===
2007 Danish general election

Parties	Vote		
Parties	Votes	%	+ / -
Social Democrats	12,838	29.73	
Venstre	8,174	18.93	
Danish People's Party	6,918	16.02	
Green Left	6,546	15.16	
Conservatives	4,268	9.88	
Social Liberals	1,883	4.36	
Red–Green Alliance	1,246	2.89	
New Alliance	1,127	2.61	
Christian Democrats	182	0.42	
Janus Kramer Møller	6	0.01	
Feride Istogu Gillesberg	0	0.00	
Total	43,188		

== European Parliament elections results ==
2024 European Parliament election in Denmark

Parties	Vote		
Parties	Votes	%	+ / -
Social Democrats	4,946	18.40	-5.40
Green Left	4,900	18.23	+4.93
Red–Green Alliance	2,966	11.04	+3.32
Venstre	2,657	9.89	-4.25
Conservatives	2,621	9.75	+2.20
Danish People's Party	2,257	8.40	-3.75
Social Liberals	1,807	6.72	-4.79
Liberal Alliance	1,508	5.61	+4.16
Moderates	1,442	5.37	New
Denmark Democrats	1,105	4.11	New
The Alternative	667	2.48	-0.44
Total	26,876		

2019 European Parliament election in Denmark

Parties	Vote		
Parties	Votes	%	+ / -
Social Democrats	7,612	23.80	+3.04
Venstre	4,523	14.14	+4.50
Green Left	4,253	13.30	+2.19
Danish People's Party	3,887	12.15	-19.23
Social Liberals	3,683	11.51	+6.59
Red–Green Alliance	2,469	7.72	New
Conservatives	2,416	7.55	-1.99
People's Movement against the EU	1,747	5.46	-5.25
The Alternative	933	2.92	New
Liberal Alliance	463	1.45	-0.50
Total	31,986		

2014 European Parliament election in Denmark

Parties	Vote		
Parties	Votes	%	+ / -
Danish People's Party	8,812	31.38	+12.30
Social Democrats	5,829	20.76	-2.28
Green Left	3,119	11.11	-5.68
People's Movement against the EU	3,007	10.71	+0.73
Venstre	2,707	9.64	-3.82
Conservatives	2,679	9.54	-0.84
Social Liberals	1,383	4.92	+1.38
Liberal Alliance	547	1.95	+1.45
Total	28,083		

2009 European Parliament election in Denmark

Parties	Vote		
Parties	Votes	%	+ / -
Social Democrats	6,715	23.04	
Danish People's Party	5,561	19.08	
Green Left	4,894	16.79	
Venstre	3,923	13.46	
Conservatives	3,026	10.38	
People's Movement against the EU	2,907	9.98	
Social Liberals	1,032	3.54	
June Movement	936	3.21	
Liberal Alliance	146	0.50	
Total	29,140		

== Referendums ==
2022 Danish European Union opt-out referendum

Option	Votes	%
✓ YES	18,831	61.83
X NO	11,625	38.17

2015 Danish European Union opt-out referendum

Option	Votes	%
X NO	20,294	57.88
✓ YES	14,767	42.12

2014 Danish Unified Patent Court membership referendum

Option	Votes	%
✓ YES	15,537	56.28
X NO	12,068	43.72

2009 Danish Act of Succession referendum

Option	Votes	%
✓ YES	22,132	83.50
X NO	4,372	16.50
