= Kenneth Kristensen Berth =

Danish politician (born 1977)

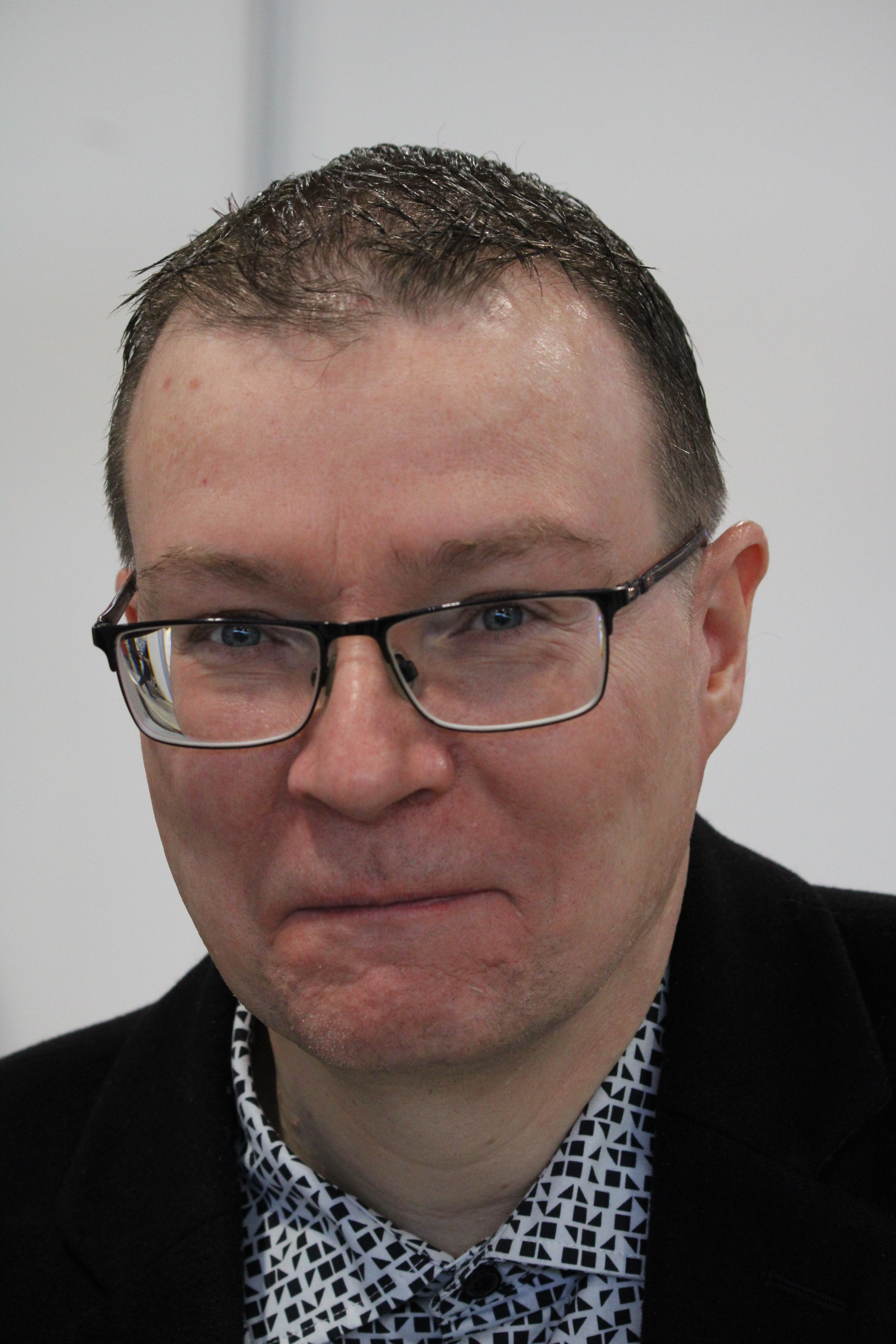
- Kristensen Berth in 2025

Member of the Folketing
- In office 18 June 2015 – 5 June 2019
- Constituency: Greater Copenhagen

Personal details
- Born: 3 February 1977 (age 49) Odense, Denmark
- Party: Danish People's Party

Kenneth Kristensen Berth (born 3 February 1977 in Odense) is a Danish politician and author, who was a member of the Folketing for the Danish People's Party from 2015 to 2019. He was the chairman of the Danish People's Party Youth from 1999 to 2007.

== Background ==
Berth was born in Odense. He has a cand.mag. (master's degree) in history and social science from Aarhus University and the University of Copenhagen from 2002. He is married and has two children.

== Political career ==
Berth was the national chairman of Danish People's Party's Youth from 1999 to 2007, and a member of the Danish People's Party central board from 1999 until 2013. He was a member of the Capital Region of Denmark region council from 2010 to 2015. Since 2010 he has been a member of the municipal council of Vallensbæk Municipality.

Berth has been a substitute member of the Folketing twice, substituting for Søren Espersen. First time was from 22 February to 6 March 2011, and the second time was from 22 October to 7 November 2014. At the 2015 Danish general election he was elected as a member of the Folketing from the Greater Copenhagen constituency.

In 2016, Berth had some criticism when he suggested shooting at boats carrying migrants.

Berth has written books about the history of the Danish People's Party's Youth, about the Progress Party and its founder, Mogens Glistrup, and about criticism of the Danish public school curriculum.

== Bibliography ==
- En dansk fremtid – historien om Dansk Folkepartis Ungdom 1995-2005 (2005)
- Skolen i løgnen – løgnen i skolen – hvordan skolebøger hetzer og indoktrinerer (2006)
- Fremskridtspartiet under Glistrup – Mogens Glistrup og Fremskridtspartiet 1972-1984 (2008).
