= Stinus Lindgreen =

Danish politician

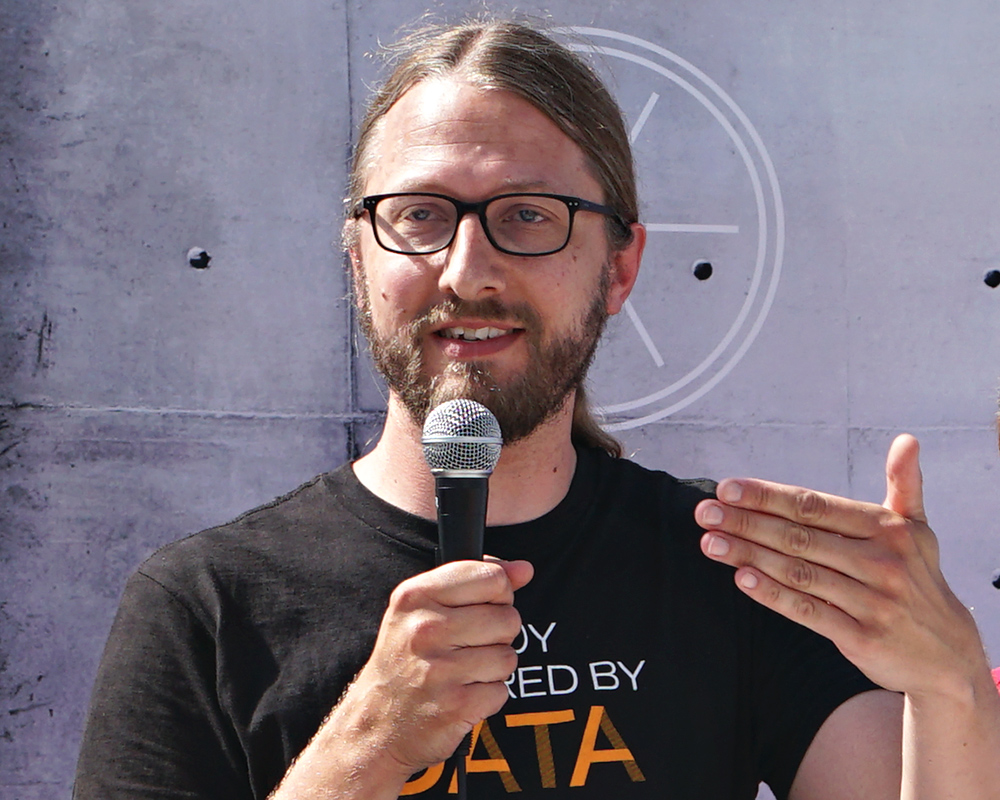
- Stinus Lindgreen

Member of the Folketing
- Incumbent
- Assumed office 5 June 2019
- Constituency: Greater Copenhagen

Personal details
- Born: 9 August 1980 (age 45) Lyngby-Taarbæk, Denmark
- Party: Social Liberal Party

Stinus Lindgreen (born 9 August 1980) is a Danish scientist and politician, who is a member of the Folketing for the Social Liberal Party. He was elected into parliament at the 2019 election.
