= Ballerup (nomination district) =

- Ballerup
- Nomination district constituency for the Folketing
- Location of Ballerup within Greater Copenhagen

- Location of Greater Copenhagen within Denmark
- Municipalities: Ballerup; Glostrup
- Constituency: Greater Copenhagen
- Electorate: 46,519 (2022)

Current constituency
- Created: 1970

Ballerup nominating district is one of the 92 nominating districts that was created for Danish elections following the 2007 municipal reform. It consists of Ballerup and Glostrup municipality. It was created in 1970, though its boundaries have been changed since then.

In general elections, the district is a strong area for parties commonly associated with the red bloc.

== General elections results ==
=== General elections in the 2020s ===
2022 Danish general election

Parties	Vote		
Parties	Votes	%	+ / -
Social Democrats	14,164	34.62	+2.36
Moderates	4,062	9.93	New
Venstre	3,885	9.49	-7.15
Green Left	3,763	9.20	+0.03
Liberal Alliance	2,745	6.71	+4.45
Conservatives	1,889	4.62	-1.15
Denmark Democrats	1,882	4.60	New
Red–Green Alliance	1,858	4.54	-2.04
Danish People's Party	1,813	4.43	-6.16
Social Liberals	1,484	3.63	-3.92
New Right	1,367	3.34	+0.85
The Alternative	1,093	2.67	+0.28
Independent Greens	697	1.70	New
Christian Democrats	160	0.39	-0.68
Jovan Tasevski	46	0.11	New
Henrik Vendelbo Petersen	9	0.02	New
Total	40,917		

=== General elections in the 2010s ===
2019 Danish general election

Parties	Vote		
Parties	Votes	%	+ / -
Social Democrats	13,529	32.26	-2.01
Venstre	6,977	16.64	+2.75
Danish People's Party	4,441	10.59	-13.49
Green Left	3,844	9.17	+4.97
Social Liberals	3,165	7.55	+4.09
Red–Green Alliance	2,759	6.58	-1.02
Conservatives	2,422	5.77	+3.42
New Right	1,044	2.49	New
The Alternative	1,003	2.39	-1.13
Liberal Alliance	946	2.26	-3.73
Stram Kurs	913	2.18	New
Christian Democrats	450	1.07	+0.55
Klaus Riskær Pedersen Party	327	0.78	New
Mads Palsvig	108	0.26	New
Christian B. Olesen	13	0.03	New
Total	41,941		

2015 Danish general election

Parties	Vote		
Parties	Votes	%	+ / -
Social Democrats	14,696	34.27	+2.49
Danish People's Party	10,326	24.08	+9.01
Venstre	5,955	13.89	-6.57
Red–Green Alliance	3,260	7.60	+0.84
Liberal Alliance	2,570	5.99	+1.75
Green Left	1,801	4.20	-4.16
The Alternative	1,509	3.52	New
Social Liberals	1,484	3.46	-4.77
Conservatives	1,008	2.35	-2.27
Christian Democrats	223	0.52	+0.16
Asif Ahmad	37	0.09	New
Christian Olesen	12	0.03	New
Total	42,881		

2011 Danish general election

Parties	Vote		
Parties	Votes	%	+ / -
Social Democrats	13,919	31.78	-2.90
Venstre	8,959	20.46	+2.56
Danish People's Party	6,599	15.07	-1.77
Green Left	3,661	8.36	-3.96
Social Liberals	3,606	8.23	+4.38
Red–Green Alliance	2,962	6.76	+4.87
Conservatives	2,024	4.62	-4.98
Liberal Alliance	1,858	4.24	+1.75
Christian Democrats	156	0.36	-0.04
Christian H. Hansen	51	0.12	New
Total	43,795		

=== General elections in the 2000s ===
2007 Danish general election

Parties	Vote		
Parties	Votes	%	+ / -
Social Democrats	14,933	34.68	+6.23
Venstre	7,709	17.90	-5.83
Danish People's Party	7,252	16.84	+2.45
Green Left	5,304	12.32	+6.01
Conservatives	4,135	9.60	-3.02
Social Liberals	1,659	3.85	-5.13
New Alliance	1,074	2.49	New
Red–Green Alliance	813	1.89	-1.29
Christian Democrats	173	0.40	-0.64
Janus Kramer Møller	4	0.01	New
Feride Istogu Gillesberg	1	0.00	New
Total	43,057		

2005 Danish general election

Parties	Vote		
Parties	Votes	%	+ / -
Social Democrats	13,645	28.45	-2.15
Venstre	11,381	23.73	-4.50
Danish People's Party	6,905	14.39	+0.80
Conservatives	6,052	12.62	+4.17
Social Liberals	4,307	8.98	+3.64
Green Left	3,028	6.31	-0.79
Red–Green Alliance	1,525	3.18	+0.75
Centre Democrats	530	1.10	-1.32
Christian Democrats	501	1.04	-0.56
Minority Party	83	0.17	New
Nahid Yazdanyar	12	0.03	New
Total	47,969		

2001 Danish general election

Parties	Vote		
Parties	Votes	%	+ / -
Social Democrats	15,033	30.60	-5.48
Venstre	13,867	28.23	+8.89
Danish People's Party	6,674	13.59	+3.93
Conservatives	4,149	8.45	-1.22
Green Left	3,486	7.10	-2.40
Social Liberals	2,625	5.34	+1.36
Red–Green Alliance	1,196	2.43	-0.16
Centre Democrats	1,189	2.42	-3.58
Christian People's Party	786	1.60	+0.25
Progress Party	118	0.24	-1.07
Total	49,123		

=== General elections in the 1990s ===
1998 Danish general election

Parties	Vote		
Parties	Votes	%	+ / -
Social Democrats	17,327	36.08	+1.65
Venstre	9,290	19.34	+2.64
Conservatives	4,643	9.67	-8.89
Danish People's Party	4,641	9.66	New
Green Left	4,562	9.50	-0.08
Centre Democrats	2,879	6.00	+1.47
Social Liberals	1,911	3.98	-1.22
Red–Green Alliance	1,244	2.59	-0.85
Christian People's Party	648	1.35	+0.41
Progress Party	628	1.31	-4.01
Democratic Renewal	131	0.27	New
Mogens Glistrup	114	0.24	-0.22
Poul Bregninge	3	0.01	New
Anders Kofoed	2	0.00	New
Total	48,023		

1994 Danish general election

Parties	Vote		
Parties	Votes	%	+ / -
Social Democrats	16,262	34.43	-3.85
Conservatives	8,768	18.56	-0.15
Venstre	7,890	16.70	+6.49
Green Left	4,527	9.58	-0.53
Progress Party	2,513	5.32	+1.43
Social Liberals	2,457	5.20	+0.78
Centre Democrats	2,142	4.53	-3.20
Red–Green Alliance	1,624	3.44	+1.53
Christian People's Party	445	0.94	-0.06
Niels I. Meyer	246	0.52	New
Mogens Glistrup	218	0.46	New
Preben Møller Hansen	131	0.28	New
Torben Faber	8	0.02	New
John Ziegler	7	0.01	New
Total	47,238		

1990 Danish general election

Parties	Vote		
Parties	Votes	%	+ / -
Social Democrats	17,555	38.28	+7.57
Conservatives	8,581	18.71	-2.12
Venstre	4,680	10.21	+4.70
Green Left	4,637	10.11	-6.27
Centre Democrats	3,545	7.73	+0.95
Social Liberals	2,026	4.42	-2.47
Progress Party	1,783	3.89	-2.77
Common Course	1,042	2.27	+0.35
Red–Green Alliance	874	1.91	New
Christian People's Party	457	1.00	+0.15
The Greens	401	0.87	-0.89
Justice Party of Denmark	260	0.57	New
Humanist Party	15	0.03	New
Total	45,856		

=== General elections in the 1980s ===
1988 Danish general election

Parties	Vote		
Parties	Votes	%	+ / -
Social Democrats	14,473	30.71	+1.22
Conservatives	9,820	20.83	-0.86
Green Left	7,723	16.38	-2.14
Social Liberals	3,246	6.89	-1.09
Centre Democrats	3,194	6.78	-0.06
Progress Party	3,138	6.66	+3.31
Venstre	2,597	5.51	+1.84
Common Course	907	1.92	-0.27
The Greens	830	1.76	0.00
Communist Party of Denmark	524	1.11	-0.02
Christian People's Party	403	0.85	-0.25
Left Socialists	274	0.58	-0.75
Leif Hilt	6	0.01	New
Total	47,135		

1987 Danish general election

Parties	Vote		
Parties	Votes	%	+ / -
Social Democrats	14,113	29.49	-3.24
Conservatives	10,380	21.69	-1.98
Green Left	8,865	18.52	+2.69
Social Liberals	3,820	7.98	+1.14
Centre Democrats	3,273	6.84	+1.37
Venstre	1,754	3.67	-1.70
Progress Party	1,604	3.35	+0.50
Common Course	1,049	2.19	New
The Greens	842	1.76	New
Left Socialists	637	1.33	-1.89
Communist Party of Denmark	540	1.13	+0.17
Christian People's Party	527	1.10	+0.05
Justice Party of Denmark	277	0.58	-1.26
Humanist Party	135	0.28	New
Socialist Workers Party	28	0.06	-0.05
Marxist–Leninists Party	10	0.02	-0.02
Carsten Grøn-Nielsen	3	0.01	0.00
Per Hillersborg	1	0.00	New
Total	47,858		

1984 Danish general election

Parties	Vote		
Parties	Votes	%	+ / -
Social Democrats	15,673	32.73	-0.09
Conservatives	11,332	23.67	+7.90
Green Left	7,578	15.83	+0.05
Social Liberals	3,276	6.84	+0.20
Centre Democrats	2,619	5.47	-3.97
Venstre	2,571	5.37	+1.17
Left Socialists	1,544	3.22	-0.68
Progress Party	1,367	2.85	-4.17
Justice Party of Denmark	879	1.84	-0.01
Christian People's Party	503	1.05	+0.33
Communist Party of Denmark	458	0.96	-0.61
Socialist Workers Party	55	0.11	+0.02
Marxist–Leninists Party	21	0.04	New
Carsten Grøn-Nielsen	5	0.01	New
Mogens Nebelong	2	0.00	-0.01
Poul Rasmussen	0	0.00	New
Total	47,883		

1981 Danish general election

Parties	Vote		
Parties	Votes	%	+ / -
Social Democrats	14,582	32.82	-6.59
Green Left	7,011	15.78	+7.25
Conservatives	7,008	15.77	+1.99
Centre Democrats	4,193	9.44	+5.75
Progress Party	3,121	7.02	-1.28
Social Liberals	2,952	6.64	-0.42
Venstre	1,867	4.20	-1.76
Left Socialists	1,735	3.90	-1.73
Justice Party of Denmark	824	1.85	-1.64
Communist Party of Denmark	699	1.57	-1.05
Christian People's Party	320	0.72	-0.18
Communist Workers Party	81	0.18	-0.45
Socialist Workers Party	40	0.09	New
Mogens Nebelong	3	0.01	New
Total	44,436		

=== General elections in the 1970s ===
1979 Danish general election

Parties	Vote		
Parties	Votes	%	+ / -
Social Democrats	17,332	39.41	-0.15
Conservatives	6,058	13.78	+5.40
Green Left	3,752	8.53	+2.13
Progress Party	3,652	8.30	-3.83
Social Liberals	3,105	7.06	+3.65
Venstre	2,621	5.96	+0.96
Left Socialists	2,478	5.63	+1.50
Centre Democrats	1,621	3.69	-5.65
Justice Party of Denmark	1,535	3.49	-0.96
Communist Party of Denmark	1,154	2.62	-2.71
Christian People's Party	394	0.90	-0.47
Communist Workers Party	276	0.63	New
Total	43,978		

1977 Danish general election

Parties	Vote		
Parties	Votes	%	+ / -
Social Democrats	16,844	39.56	+10.23
Progress Party	5,165	12.13	-1.50
Centre Democrats	3,978	9.34	+5.93
Conservatives	3,567	8.38	+2.34
Green Left	2,727	6.40	-3.05
Communist Party of Denmark	2,270	5.33	-0.95
Venstre	2,130	5.00	-10.89
Justice Party of Denmark	1,894	4.45	+2.04
Left Socialists	1,757	4.13	+1.17
Social Liberals	1,452	3.41	-4.18
Christian People's Party	583	1.37	-1.59
Pensioners' Party	209	0.49	New
Poul Rasmussen	1	0.00	New
Otto Jensen	0	0.00	New
Total	42,577		

1975 Danish general election

Parties	Vote		
Parties	Votes	%	+ / -
Social Democrats	11,994	29.33	+6.70
Venstre	6,498	15.89	+9.63
Progress Party	5,574	13.63	-1.40
Green Left	3,864	9.45	-1.13
Social Liberals	3,103	7.59	-1.82
Communist Party of Denmark	2,566	6.28	+1.01
Conservatives	2,469	6.04	-3.75
Centre Democrats	1,396	3.41	-9.93
Left Socialists	1,210	2.96	+0.63
Christian People's Party	1,209	2.96	+1.14
Justice Party of Denmark	986	2.41	-1.13
J. G. Amdrejcak	10	0.02	New
Kai Clemmensen	4	0.01	New
Henning Glahn	3	0.01	New
Poul Friborg	1	0.00	New
Total	40,887		

1973 Danish general election

Parties	Vote		
Parties	Votes	%	+ / -
Social Democrats	9,406	22.63	-13.88
Progress Party	6,248	15.03	New
Centre Democrats	5,545	13.34	New
Green Left	4,399	10.58	-4.44
Conservatives	4,068	9.79	-10.85
Social Liberals	3,910	9.41	-4.17
Venstre	2,603	6.26	-0.54
Communist Party of Denmark	2,191	5.27	+2.96
Justice Party of Denmark	1,471	3.54	+1.95
Left Socialists	968	2.33	-0.19
Christian People's Party	755	1.82	+1.09
Erik Dissing	8	0.02	New
Total	41,572		

1971 Danish general election

Parties	Vote		
Parties	Votes	%	+ / -
Social Democrats	13,872	36.51	
Conservatives	7,842	20.64	
Green Left	5,707	15.02	
Social Liberals	5,161	13.58	
Venstre	2,584	6.80	
Left Socialists	958	2.52	
Communist Party of Denmark	876	2.31	
Justice Party of Denmark	604	1.59	
Christian People's Party	279	0.73	
Henning Berthelsen	115	0.30	
Total	37,998		

== European Parliament elections results ==
2024 European Parliament election in Denmark

Parties	Vote		
Parties	Votes	%	+ / -
Social Democrats	5,559	20.1	-6.91
Green Left	5,167	18.69	+5.27
Venstre	3,049	11.03	-5.54
Conservatives	2,455	8.88	+3.36
Danish People's Party	2,246	8.12	-4.60
Red–Green Alliance	2,002	7.24	+1.45
Social Liberals	1,860	6.73	-2.77
Moderates	1,728	6.25	New
Liberal Alliance	1,719	6.22	+4.44
Denmark Democrats	1,053	3.81	New
The Alternative	814	2.94	+0.24
Total	27,652		

2019 European Parliament election in Denmark

Parties	Vote		
Parties	Votes	%	+ / -
Social Democrats	8,703	27.01	+3.97
Venstre	5,338	16.57	+5.47
Green Left	4,324	13.42	+3.43
Danish People's Party	4,099	12.72	-19.37
Social Liberals	3,061	9.50	+3.88
Red–Green Alliance	1,867	5.79	New
Conservatives	1,779	5.52	-1.33
People's Movement against the EU	1,608	4.99	-3.97
The Alternative	870	2.70	New
Liberal Alliance	575	1.78	-0.57
Total	32,224		

2014 European Parliament election in Denmark

Parties	Vote		
Parties	Votes	%	+ / -
Danish People's Party	9,346	32.09	+12.48
Social Democrats	6,709	23.04	-1.64
Venstre	3,234	11.10	-2.40
Green Left	2,910	9.99	-6.47
People's Movement against the EU	2,608	8.96	-0.54
Conservatives	1,994	6.85	-2.82
Social Liberals	1,638	5.62	+2.16
Liberal Alliance	684	2.35	+1.83
Total	29,123		

2009 European Parliament election in Denmark

Parties	Vote		
Parties	Votes	%	+ / -
Social Democrats	7,221	24.68	-7.41
Danish People's Party	5,736	19.61	+12.14
Green Left	4,815	16.46	+6.80
Venstre	3,948	13.50	+0.27
Conservatives	2,828	9.67	-4.94
People's Movement against the EU	2,780	9.50	+3.45
Social Liberals	1,012	3.46	-3.48
June Movement	762	2.60	-6.71
Liberal Alliance	152	0.52	New
Total	29,254		

2004 European Parliament election in Denmark

Parties	Vote		
Parties	Votes	%	+ / -
Social Democrats	9,464	32.09	+16.03
Conservatives	4,308	14.61	+5.32
Venstre	3,903	13.23	-4.88
Green Left	2,848	9.66	+1.05
June Movement	2,747	9.31	-8.39
Danish People's Party	2,203	7.47	+0.65
Social Liberals	2,046	6.94	-3.01
People's Movement against the EU	1,785	6.05	-2.19
Christian Democrats	192	0.65	-0.51
Total	29,496		

1999 European Parliament election in Denmark

Parties	Vote		
Parties	Votes	%	+ / -
Venstre	5,477	18.11	+5.58
June Movement	5,352	17.70	+0.26
Social Democrats	4,855	16.06	+0.92
Social Liberals	3,009	9.95	-0.09
Conservatives	2,809	9.29	-9.59
Green Left	2,603	8.61	-2.44
People's Movement against the EU	2,490	8.24	-2.75
Danish People's Party	2,063	6.82	New
Centre Democrats	1,226	4.05	+3.02
Christian Democrats	352	1.16	+0.70
Progress Party	121	0.40	-2.05
Total	30,236		

1994 European Parliament election in Denmark

Parties	Vote		
Parties	Votes	%	+ / -
Conservatives	5,930	18.88	+5.42
June Movement	5,478	17.44	New
Social Democrats	4,755	15.14	-7.30
Venstre	3,937	12.53	+1.47
Green Left	3,471	11.05	-0.21
People's Movement against the EU	3,453	10.99	-14.17
Social Liberals	3,155	10.04	+7.28
Progress Party	769	2.45	-1.06
Centre Democrats	324	1.03	-8.00
Christian Democrats	145	0.46	-0.84
Total	31,417		

1989 European Parliament election in Denmark

Parties	Vote		
Parties	Votes	%	+ / -
People's Movement against the EU	6,790	25.16	-2.43
Social Democrats	6,056	22.44	+3.52
Conservatives	3,633	13.46	-7.61
Green Left	3,039	11.26	-2.46
Venstre	2,985	11.06	+7.24
Centre Democrats	2,436	9.03	+2.50
Progress Party	947	3.51	+0.78
Social Liberals	745	2.76	-0.27
Christian Democrats	352	1.30	0.00
Total	26,983		

1984 European Parliament election in Denmark

Parties	Vote	
Parties	Votes	%
People's Movement against the EU	8,241	27.59
Conservatives	6,292	21.07
Social Democrats	5,649	18.92
Green Left	4,096	13.72
Centre Democrats	1,951	6.53
Venstre	1,141	3.82
Social Liberals	904	3.03
Progress Party	814	2.73
Left Socialists	389	1.30
Christian Democrats	388	1.30
Total	29,865	

== Referendums ==
2022 Danish European Union opt-out referendum

Option	Votes	%
✓ YES	20,814	64.47
X NO	11,471	35.53

2015 Danish European Union opt-out referendum

Option	Votes	%
X NO	20,678	57.59
✓ YES	15,227	42.41

2014 Danish Unified Patent Court membership referendum

Option	Votes	%
✓ YES	16,330	57.15
X NO	12,242	42.85

2009 Danish Act of Succession referendum

Option	Votes	%
✓ YES	21,135	82.55
X NO	4,468	17.45

2000 Danish euro referendum

Option	Votes	%
X NO	25,799	53.02
✓ YES	22,864	46.98

1998 Danish Amsterdam Treaty referendum

Option	Votes	%
✓ YES	23,351	53.48
X NO	20,312	46.52

1993 Danish Maastricht Treaty referendum

Option	Votes	%
✓ YES	26,439	54.17
X NO	22,367	45.83

1992 Danish Maastricht Treaty referendum

Option	Votes	%
X NO	25,133	52.76
✓ YES	22,500	47.24

1986 Danish Single European Act referendum

Option	Votes	%
X NO	22,721	53.70
✓ YES	19,588	46.30

1972 Danish European Communities membership referendum

Option	Votes	%
✓ YES	21,950	53.17
X NO	19,330	46.83
