= Sofie de Bretteville =

Danish politician (born 2001)

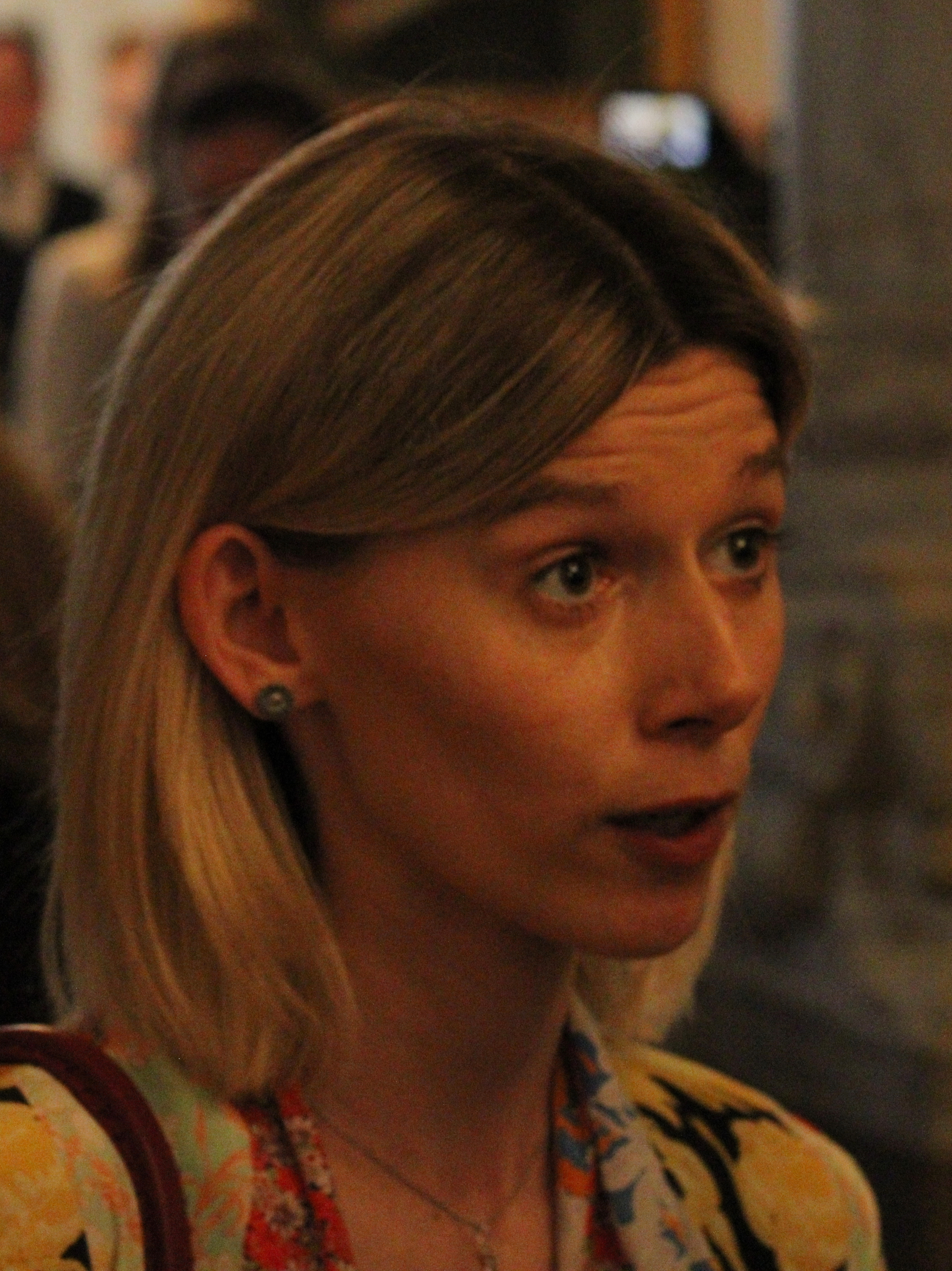
- de Bretteville in 2026

Member of the Folketing
- Incumbent
- Assumed office 24 March 2026
- Constituency: Greater Copenhagen

Personal details
- Born: 29 March 2001 (age 25)
- Party: Social Democrats

Sofie de Bretteville Olsen (born 29 March 2001) is a Danish politician serving as a member of the Folketing since 2026. She is the chairwoman of the Social Democratic Youth in Greater Copenhagen.
