= Fokus =

Fokus Fokus
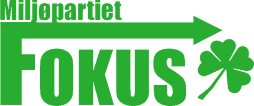
- Leader: Christian Hansen
- Founded: 10 March 2010
- Dissolved: September 2015
- Ideology: Green politics Animal rights Animal welfare Social welfare Regionalism
- Political position: Centre-left
- Colours: Green, red

Website
- www.partietfokus.dk

Fokus was a political party in Denmark founded in 2010. Originally a splinter group of the Danish People’s Party (DF), the politics of Fokus differed from that of DF on a number of issues. For instance, while DF supported Lars Løkke Rasmussen, Fokus had voiced support for Helle Thorning-Schmidt of the Social Democrats. The party was dissolved in 2015.

== Representation ==
The party had one member in the Danish parliament from 2010 to November 2011. It did not qualify to run in the 2011 elections. The party formerly had two members of local city councils, one in Viborg and one in Lejre. The leader of the party was the former MP Christian Hansen.

== Political positions ==
The main issues of Fokus were environmental and energy policy, as well as animal welfare. Fokus branded itself as “the greenest party of Denmark”. Another important issue was social welfare, and the party persistently emphasized the need for more balance everywhere in society, not least between the bigger cities and smaller communities in the countryside, an issue which has become increasingly debated in Denmark since 2010, especially with respect to health policy. Although taking a regionalist stance on many issues, Fokus wanted to close down the regions (administrative entities on the level between state and municipalities) and let the state take over responsibility for hospitals, which are currently run by these regions.

The slogan of Fokus is (in Danish) Frihed, Omsorg, Kommunikation, Udholdenhed, Samarbejde (Freedom, Care, Communication, Persistence, Cooperation).
