= Rasmus Lund-Nielsen =

Danish politician (born 1988)

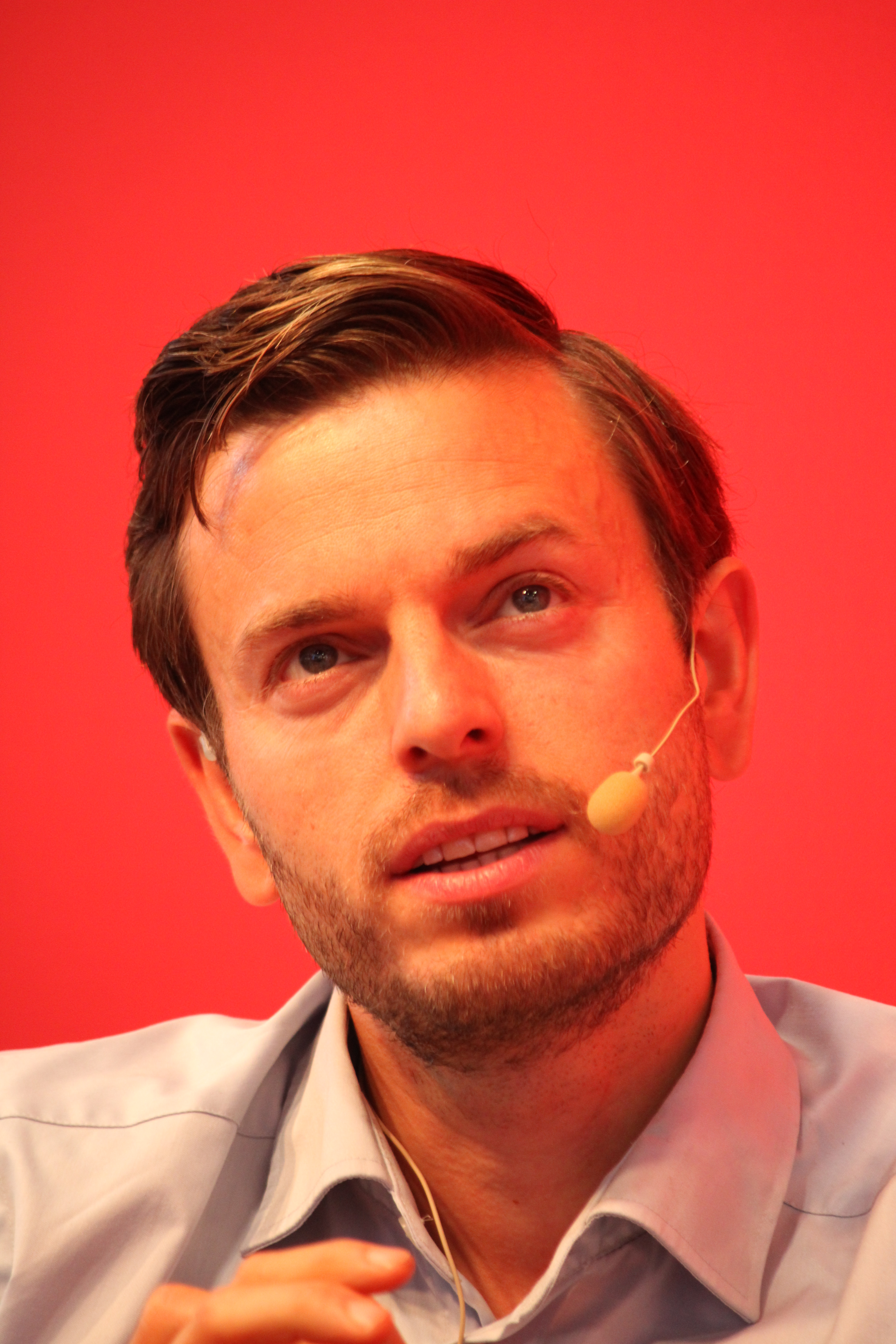
- Lund-Nielsen in 2025

Member of the Folketing
- Incumbent
- Assumed office 1 November 2022
- Constituency: Greater Copenhagen

Personal details
- Born: 21 October 1988 (age 37) Denmark
- Party: Moderates
- Occupation: Politician

Rasmus Lund-Nielsen (born 21 October 1988) is a Danish politician and Member of the Folketing for Greater Copenhagen from the Moderates. Alongside sixteen other members of The Moderates, Lund-Nielsen was elected to the Folketing in November 2022. He is his party's spokesperson on children, education, psychiatry and well-being.

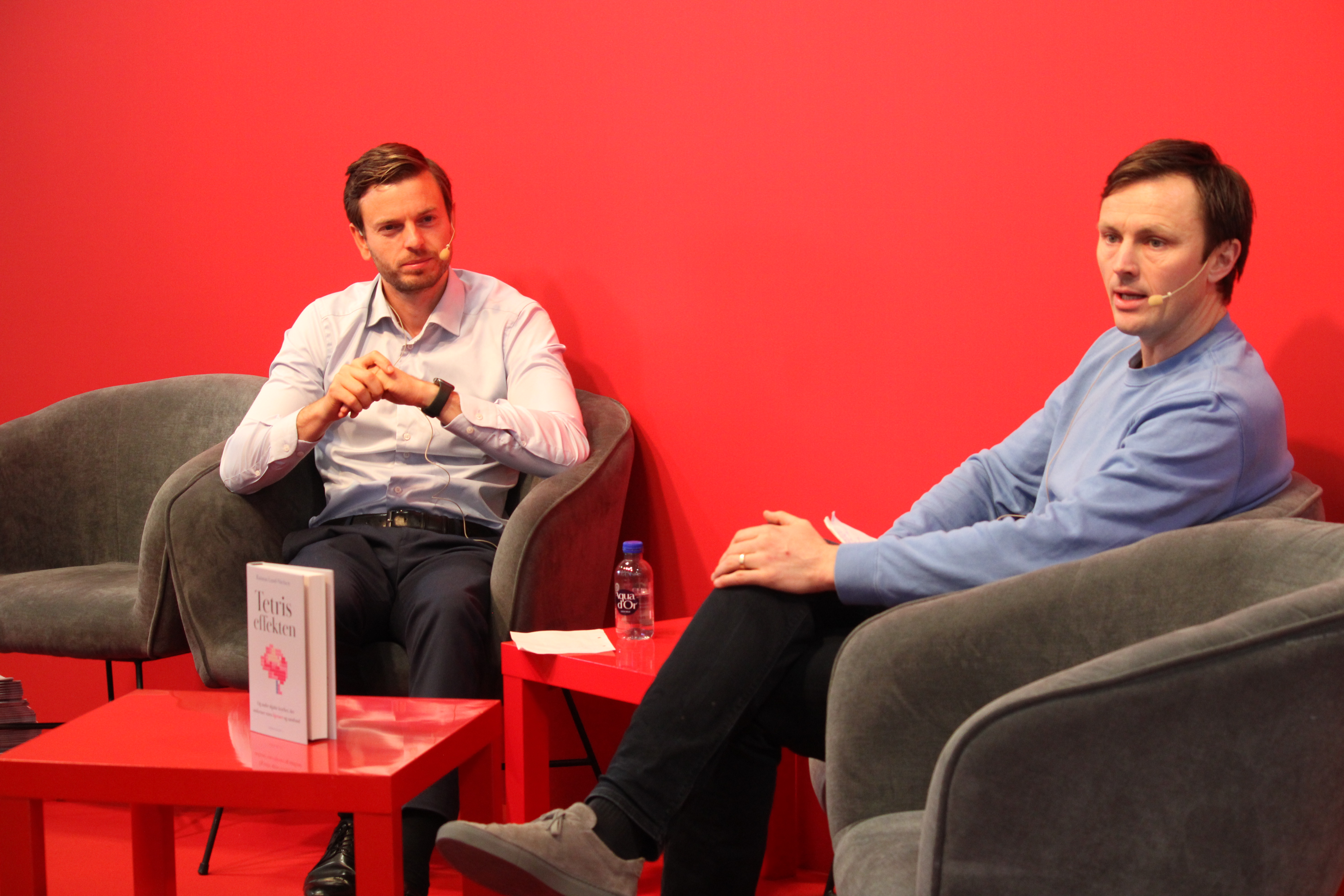
Lund-Nielsen being interviewed by William Kvist about his book at Bogforum 2025

== See also ==
- List of members of the Folketing, 2022–present
