= Ina Strøjer-Schmidt =

Danish politician (born 1988)

Member of the Folketing
- In office 5 June 2019 – 1 November 2022
- Constituency: Greater Copenhagen

Personal details
- Born: 20 September 1988 (age 37)
- Party: Socialist People's Party

Ina Strøjer-Schmidt (born 20 September 1988) is a Danish politician, who is a member of the Folketing for the Socialist People's Party. She was elected into parliament at the 2019 Danish general election.

== Political career ==
Strøjer-Schmidt was elected into parliament at the 2019 election, although initially at low odds. Before the election she was a relatively unknown politician, and with prominent candidate Serdal Benli also running in the Greater Copenhagen constituency for the Socialist People's Party, experts did not expect to see Strøjer-Schmidt elected. In the election Strøjer-Schmidt received around 4,000 votes while Benli only received around 3,000. Strøjer-Schmidt remained relatively unknown after the election as well, however, with several political commentators not recognizing her name. In the beginning of the 2019–2023 term she was absent in many votes in the parliament, due to her being a member of Nordic Council.
