= Ibrahim Benli =

Danish politician (born 1979)

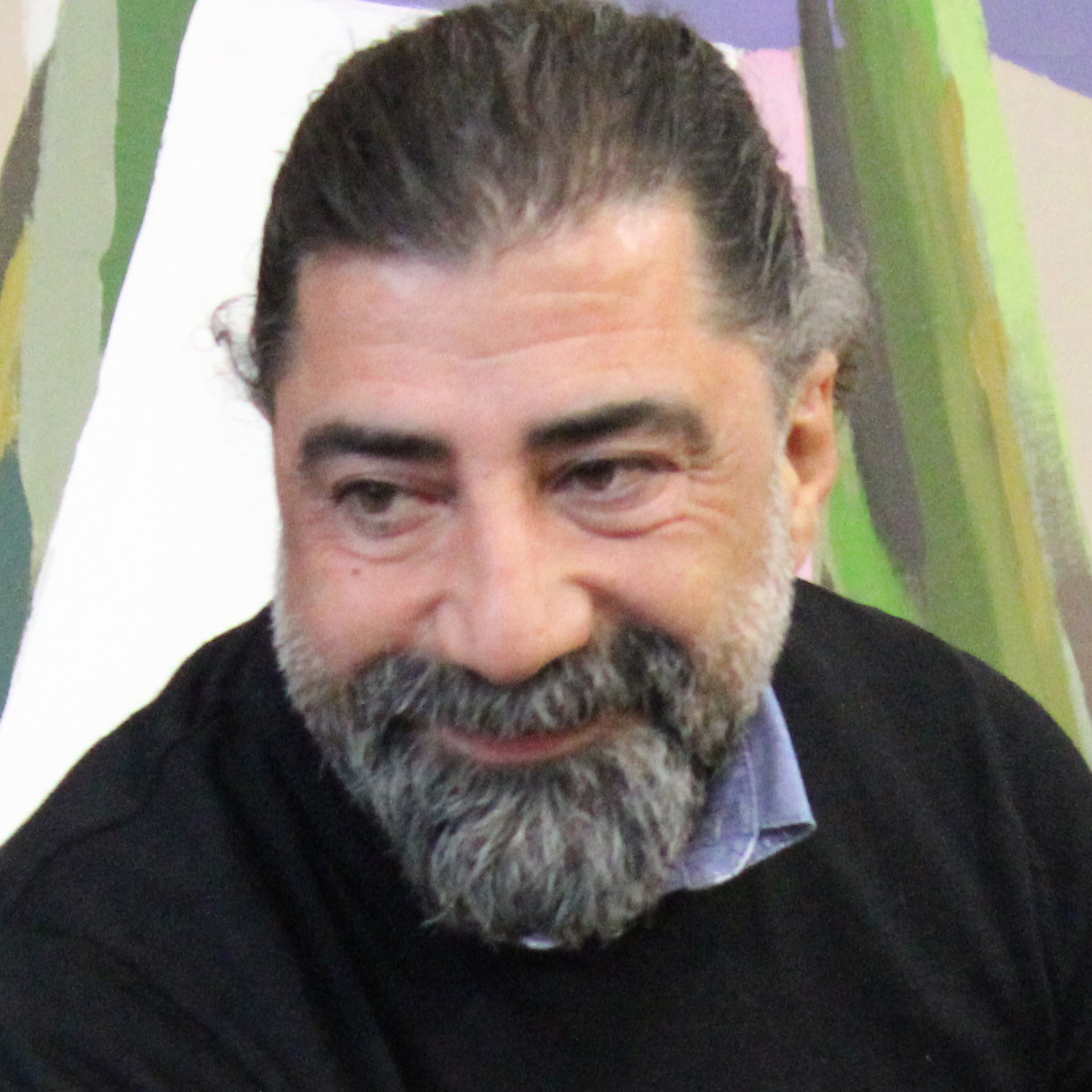
- Benli in 2026

Member of the Folketing
- Incumbent
- Assumed office 24 March 2026
- Constituency: Greater Copenhagen

Personal details
- Born: 1 January 1979 (age 47) Ankara, Turkey
- Party: Red–Green Alliance

Ibrahim Benli (born 1 January 1979) is a Danish politician and Member of the Folketing. A member of the Red–Green Alliance, he has represented Greater Copenhagen since March 2026.

Benli was born on 1 January 1979 in Bomsoz, Ankara. He is of Kurdish origin and moved to Denmark as a young man in 2000. He has been a member of the municipal council in Herlev since 2018. He was elected to the Folketing at the 2026 general election.

Electoral history of Ibrahim Benli
Election	Constituency	Party	Personal votes	Total votes	Result
2017 local	Herlev Municipality	Red–Green Alliance	272		Elected
2019 general	Greater Copenhagen	Red–Green Alliance	1,587	3,921	Not elected
2021 local	Herlev Municipality	Red–Green Alliance	355		Elected
2022 general	Copenhagen	Red–Green Alliance	1,052	3,903	Not elected
2024 European	Denmark	Red–Green Alliance		4,212	Not elected
2025 local	Herlev Municipality	Red–Green Alliance	415		Elected
2026 general	Greater Copenhagen	Red–Green Alliance	2,740	5,230	Elected
