= Charlotte Munch =

Danish politician

Member of the Folketing
- Incumbent
- Assumed office 1 November 2022
- Constituency: Greater Copenhagen

Personal details
- Born: 1967 (age 58–59) Copenhagen, Denmark
- Party: Denmark Democrats (2022-); Venstre (until 2021)

Charlotte Munch (born 1967) is a Danish politician who is a Member of the Folketing for the Denmark Democrats party. She was elected in the 2022 Danish general election for the Greater Copenhagen constituency.

== Biography ==
Munch worked as a florist and then as a clinical manager in the healthcare industry for a number of years. She was elected as a municipal councilor in Hvidovre Municipality as a member of Venstre in 2018 and served on the board of the Town and Planning Committee in Hvidovre. She left Venstre in 2021 but remained on the municipal council as an independent. She subsequently joined the Denmark Democrats party founded by former Venstre minister Inger Støjberg, stating that she agreed with the party's policies on immigration and the European Union.

During the 2022 general election in Denmark, Munch stood as a candidate for the Denmark Democrats in the Greater Copenhagen area constituency and was elected to the Folketing.
