= Brøndby (nomination district) =

- Brøndby
- Nomination district constituency for the Folketing
- Location of Brøndby within Greater Copenhagen

- Location of Greater Copenhagen within Denmark
- Municipalities: Brøndby; Ishøj; Vallensbæk
- Constituency: Greater Copenhagen
- Electorate: 47,721 (2022)

Current constituency
- Created: 2007

Brøndby nominating district is one of the 92 nominating districts that was created for Danish elections following the 2007 municipal reform. It consists of Brøndby, Ishøj and Vallensbæk municipality.

In general elections, the district is a strong area for parties commonly associated with the red bloc.

== General elections results ==
=== General elections in the 2020s ===
2022 Danish general election

| Parties | Vote | | |
| Parties | Votes | % | + / - |
|---|---|---|---|
| Social Democrats | 11,908 | 33.11 | +1.96 |
| Moderates | 3,192 | 8.88 | New |
| Green Left | 2,934 | 8.16 | +0.18 |
| Venstre | 2,899 | 8.06 | -7.06 |
| Liberal Alliance | 2,097 | 5.83 | +4.24 |
| Independent Greens | 2,041 | 5.68 | New |
| Denmark Democrats | 1,953 | 5.43 | New |
| Conservatives | 1,921 | 5.34 | -1.05 |
| Red–Green Alliance | 1,898 | 5.28 | -1.57 |
| Danish People's Party | 1,747 | 4.86 | -5.93 |
| New Right | 1,324 | 3.68 | +1.21 |
| Social Liberals | 1,258 | 3.50 | -6.97 |
| The Alternative | 543 | 1.51 | -1.74 |
| Christian Democrats | 194 | 0.54 | -0.11 |
| Jovan Tasevski | 45 | 0.13 | New |
| Henrik Vendelbo Petersen | 6 | 0.02 | New |
| Total | 35,960 | | |

=== General elections in the 2010s ===
2019 Danish general election

| Parties | Vote | | |
| Parties | Votes | % | + / - |
|---|---|---|---|
| Social Democrats | 11,900 | 31.15 | -1.86 |
| Venstre | 5,778 | 15.12 | +1.99 |
| Danish People's Party | 4,121 | 10.79 | -15.05 |
| Social Liberals | 4,002 | 10.47 | +7.14 |
| Green Left | 3,049 | 7.98 | +3.04 |
| Red–Green Alliance | 2,616 | 6.85 | -0.88 |
| Conservatives | 2,441 | 6.39 | +3.44 |
| The Alternative | 1,242 | 3.25 | +0.42 |
| New Right | 944 | 2.47 | New |
| Stram Kurs | 901 | 2.36 | New |
| Liberal Alliance | 609 | 1.59 | -4.03 |
| Klaus Riskær Pedersen Party | 251 | 0.66 | New |
| Christian Democrats | 249 | 0.65 | +0.36 |
| Mads Palsvig | 84 | 0.22 | New |
| Christian B. Olesen | 21 | 0.05 | New |
| Total | 38,208 | | |

2015 Danish general election

| Parties | Vote | | |
| Parties | Votes | % | + / - |
|---|---|---|---|
| Social Democrats | 12,648 | 33.01 | +2.91 |
| Danish People's Party | 9,901 | 25.84 | +9.76 |
| Venstre | 5,030 | 13.13 | -7.26 |
| Red–Green Alliance | 2,962 | 7.73 | +0.90 |
| Liberal Alliance | 2,152 | 5.62 | +1.90 |
| Green Left | 1,893 | 4.94 | -4.79 |
| Social Liberals | 1,275 | 3.33 | -4.42 |
| Conservatives | 1,129 | 2.95 | -2.13 |
| The Alternative | 1,085 | 2.83 | New |
| Christian Democrats | 112 | 0.29 | +0.03 |
| Asif Ahmad | 102 | 0.27 | New |
| Christian Olesen | 30 | 0.08 | New |
| Total | 38,319 | | |

2011 Danish general election

| Parties | Vote | | |
| Parties | Votes | % | + / - |
|---|---|---|---|
| Social Democrats | 11,976 | 30.10 | -1.16 |
| Venstre | 8,110 | 20.39 | +2.22 |
| Danish People's Party | 6,397 | 16.08 | -2.40 |
| Green Left | 3,871 | 9.73 | -3.66 |
| Social Liberals | 3,085 | 7.75 | +4.06 |
| Red–Green Alliance | 2,716 | 6.83 | +4.72 |
| Conservatives | 2,020 | 5.08 | -4.88 |
| Liberal Alliance | 1,478 | 3.72 | +1.23 |
| Christian Democrats | 103 | 0.26 | -0.16 |
| Christian H. Hansen | 28 | 0.07 | New |
| Total | 39,784 | | |

=== General elections in the 2000s ===
2007 Danish general election

| Parties | Vote | | |
| Parties | Votes | % | + / - |
|---|---|---|---|
| Social Democrats | 12,135 | 31.26 | |
| Danish People's Party | 7,172 | 18.48 | |
| Venstre | 7,053 | 18.17 | |
| Green Left | 5,199 | 13.39 | |
| Conservatives | 3,868 | 9.96 | |
| Social Liberals | 1,434 | 3.69 | |
| New Alliance | 966 | 2.49 | |
| Red–Green Alliance | 819 | 2.11 | |
| Christian Democrats | 162 | 0.42 | |
| Janus Kramer Møller | 10 | 0.03 | |
| Feride Istogu Gillesberg | 2 | 0.01 | |
| Total | 38,820 | | |

== European Parliament elections results ==
2024 European Parliament election in Denmark

| Parties | Vote | | |
| Parties | Votes | % | + / - |
|---|---|---|---|
| Social Democrats | 4,648 | 20.61 | -4.99 |
| Green Left | 3,525 | 15.63 | +4.47 |
| Red–Green Alliance | 2,494 | 11.06 | +3.74 |
| Venstre | 2,169 | 9.62 | -5.69 |
| Conservatives | 2,119 | 9.40 | +2.82 |
| Danish People's Party | 2,102 | 9.32 | -4.62 |
| Moderates | 1,375 | 6.10 | New |
| Liberal Alliance | 1,270 | 5.63 | +4.28 |
| Social Liberals | 1,250 | 5.54 | -6.21 |
| Denmark Democrats | 1,075 | 4.77 | New |
| The Alternative | 525 | 2.33 | +0.06 |
| Total | 22,552 | | |

2019 European Parliament election in Denmark

| Parties | Vote | | |
| Parties | Votes | % | + / - |
|---|---|---|---|
| Social Democrats | 7,209 | 25.60 | +3.50 |
| Venstre | 4,313 | 15.31 | +5.24 |
| Danish People's Party | 3,926 | 13.94 | -21.38 |
| Social Liberals | 3,308 | 11.75 | +7.13 |
| Green Left | 3,142 | 11.16 | +2.41 |
| Red–Green Alliance | 2,061 | 7.32 | New |
| Conservatives | 1,852 | 6.58 | -1.18 |
| People's Movement against the EU | 1,331 | 4.73 | -4.20 |
| The Alternative | 639 | 2.27 | New |
| Liberal Alliance | 381 | 1.35 | -1.09 |
| Total | 28,162 | | |

2014 European Parliament election in Denmark

| Parties | Vote | | |
| Parties | Votes | % | + / - |
|---|---|---|---|
| Danish People's Party | 8,619 | 35.32 | +13.20 |
| Social Democrats | 5,394 | 22.10 | -2.93 |
| Venstre | 2,457 | 10.07 | -2.74 |
| People's Movement against the EU | 2,180 | 8.93 | -0.36 |
| Green Left | 2,136 | 8.75 | -5.64 |
| Conservatives | 1,894 | 7.76 | -3.02 |
| Social Liberals | 1,128 | 4.62 | +1.54 |
| Liberal Alliance | 596 | 2.44 | +1.96 |
| Total | 24,404 | | |

2009 European Parliament election in Denmark

| Parties | Vote | | |
| Parties | Votes | % | + / - |
|---|---|---|---|
| Social Democrats | 6,296 | 25.03 | |
| Danish People's Party | 5,564 | 22.12 | |
| Green Left | 3,619 | 14.39 | |
| Venstre | 3,222 | 12.81 | |
| Conservatives | 2,713 | 10.78 | |
| People's Movement against the EU | 2,337 | 9.29 | |
| Social Liberals | 775 | 3.08 | |
| June Movement | 510 | 2.03 | |
| Liberal Alliance | 120 | 0.48 | |
| Total | 25,156 | | |

== Referendums ==
2022 Danish European Union opt-out referendum

| Option | Votes | % |
|---|---|---|
| ✓ YES | 16,091 | 59.98 |
| X NO | 10,738 | 40.02 |

2015 Danish European Union opt-out referendum

| Option | Votes | % |
|---|---|---|
| X NO | 18,443 | 59.12 |
| ✓ YES | 12,753 | 40.88 |

2014 Danish Unified Patent Court membership referendum

| Option | Votes | % |
|---|---|---|
| ✓ YES | 13,413 | 56.18 |
| X NO | 10,462 | 43.82 |

2009 Danish Act of Succession referendum

| Option | Votes | % |
|---|---|---|
| ✓ YES | 19,186 | 82.20 |
| X NO | 4,155 | 17.80 |
