= Christian Hansen (politician) =

Danish politician (born 1963)

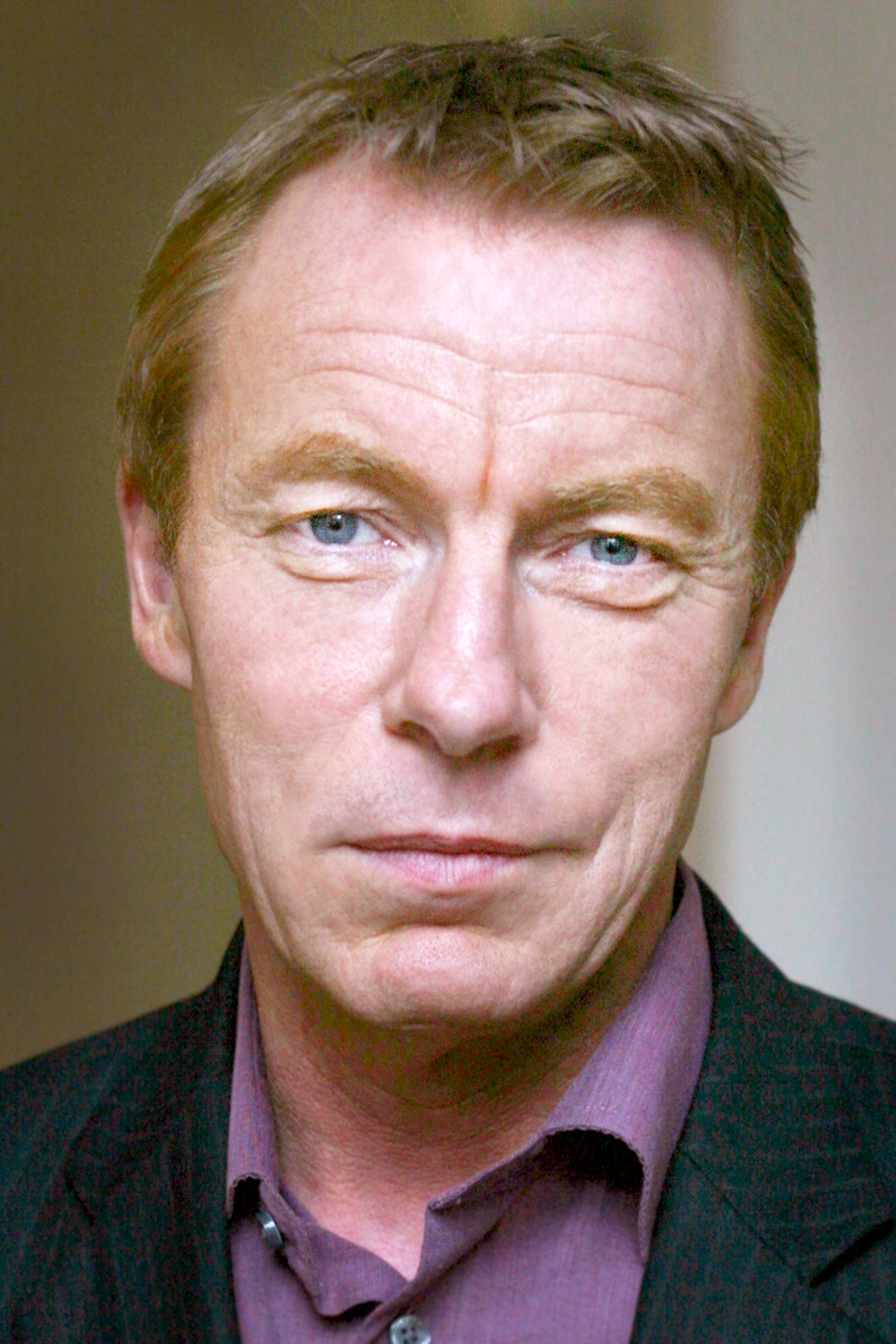
Christian Hansen

Christian Hansen (born 12 August 1963) is a Danish politician from Odense and former member of the Folketing from 1998 to 2011, first for the Danish People's Party and later as an independent. He is the current chairman of Miljøpartiet Fokus.

From 1998 to 2010, Hansen served as a representative of the Danish People's Party before resigning from the party on 19 January 2010. Hansen had served as the DPP's spokesman for animal rights. He subsequently remained in the Folketing as an independent.

On 11 March 2010 Hansen announced the formation of his own party, Fokus. The new party was not able to gather enough supporters of their candidature to be able to run as a party in the 2011 elections to the Folketing, but Hansen and a few others stood as independents, although none of them were elected.
