= Maria Durhuus =

Danish politician (born 1977)

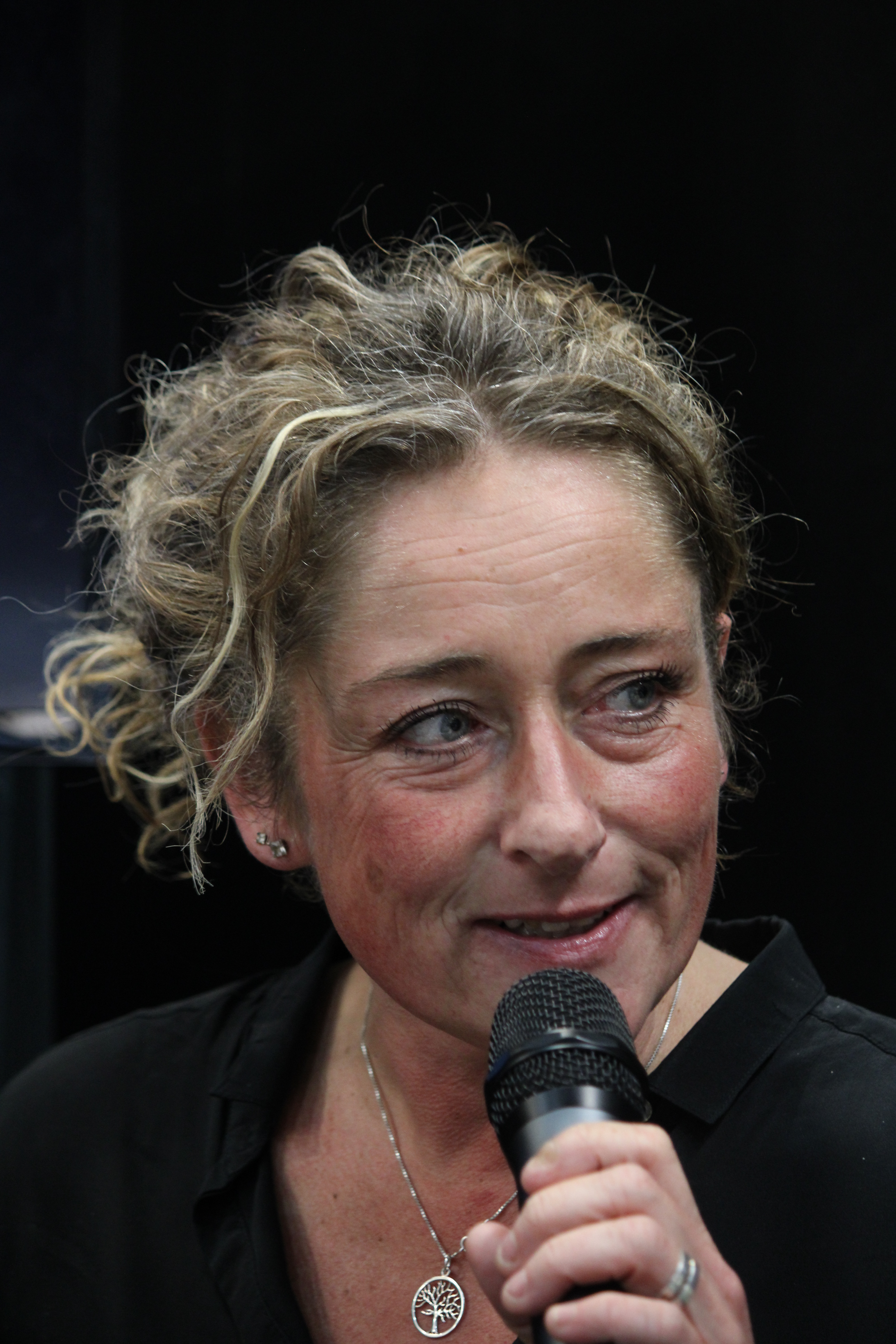
- Durhuus in 2025

Member of the Folketing
- In office 1 November 2022 – 24 March 2026
- Constituency: Greater Copenhagen

Personal details
- Born: 25 September 1977 (age 48) Ringkøbing, Denmark
- Party: Social Democrats

Maria Staghøj Durhuus (born 25 September 1977) is a Danish politician and former Member of the Folketing. A Social Democrat, she represented Greater Copenhagen from November 2022 to March 2026.

Durhuus was born on 25 September 1977 in Ringkøbing. She is the daughter of Hans Arne Staghøj and educator Lilian Steffensen. She was educated at Thisted Gymnasium og HF and studied nursing. She was a nurse at various establishments from 2006 to 2019. She worked for Copenhagen City Council's Thorupgården housing scheme from 2020 to 2022. She was a member of the municipal council in Hvidovre Municipality from 2013 to 2022.

Durhuus has four sons.

Electoral history of Maria Durhuus
Election	Constituency	Party	Votes	Result
2013 local	Hvidovre Municipality	Social Democrats	152	Elected
2017 local	Hvidovre Municipality	Social Democrats	262	Elected
2019 general	Greater Copenhagen	Social Democrats	6,092	Not elected
2021 local	Hvidovre Municipality	Social Democrats	315	Elected
2022 general	Greater Copenhagen	Social Democrats	2,616	Elected
2026 general	Greater Copenhagen	Social Democrats	2,836	Not elected
