= Sigurd Agersnap =

Danish politician (born 1993)

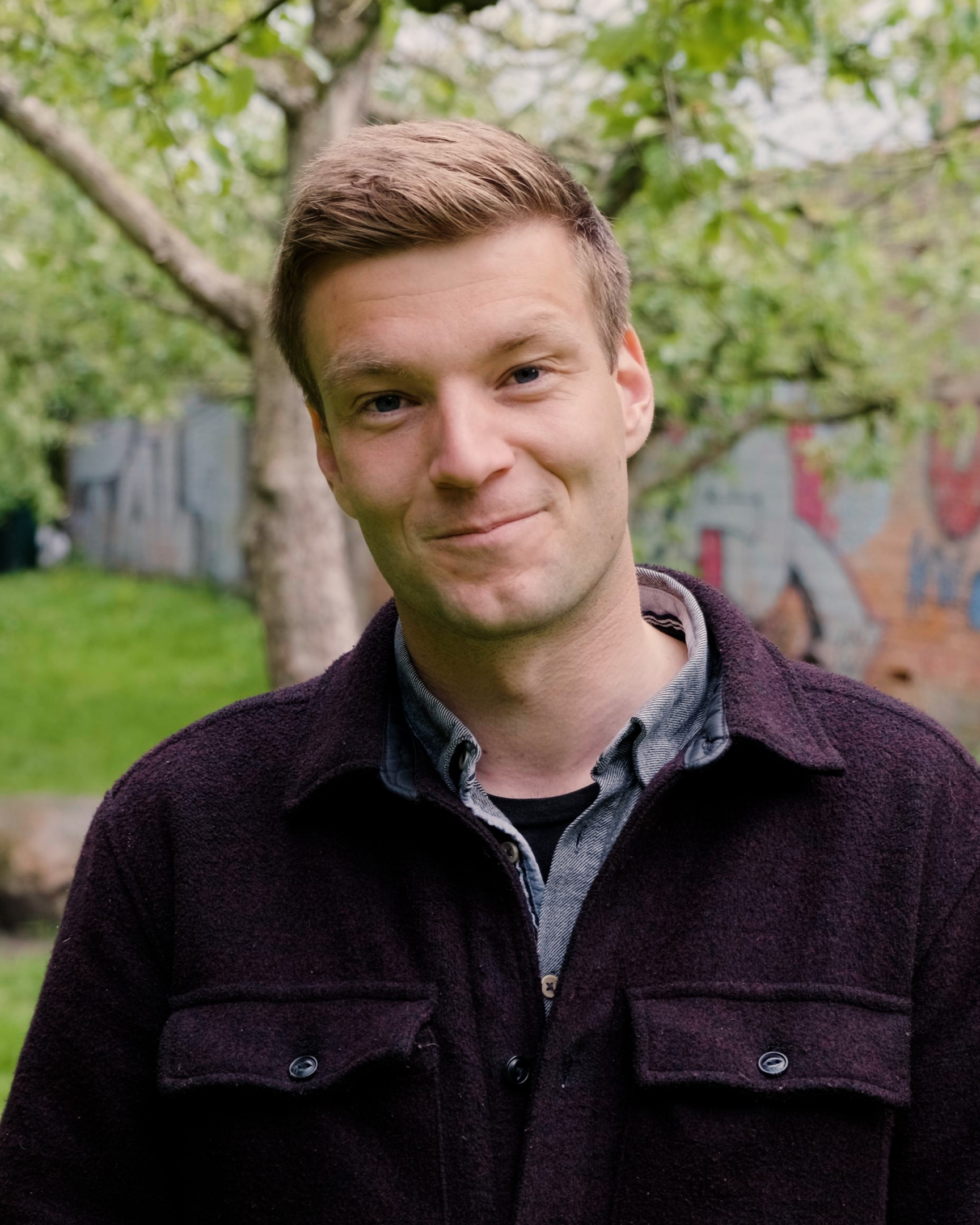
- Agersnap in July 2022

Member of the Folketing
- Incumbent
- Assumed office 1 November 2022
- Constituency: Greater Copenhagen

Personal details
- Born: Sigurd Agersnap Gustavson; 2 March 1993 (age 33) Copenhagen, Denmark
- Party: Green Left
- Education: University of Copenhagen
- Website: sf.dk/politiker/sigurd-agersnap/

Sigurd Agersnap Gustavson (born 2 March 1993) is a Danish politician and member of the Folketing, the national legislature. A member of the Green Left party, he has represented Greater Copenhagen since November 2022.

Agersnap was born on 2 March 1993 in Copenhagen. He is son of biologist Kim Gustavson and ethnogeographer Hanne Agersnap, a Member of the Folketing for Greater Copenhagen (2007–2011). He was educated at Fuglsanggårdsskolen and Virum Gymnasium in Virum. He has a Master of Science degree in political science from the University of Copenhagen (2020). He was a student assistant for the Danish Confederation of Trade Unions (LO) (2016–2018) and an intern at Oxfam IBIS (2019–2020). He was a consultant for the Danish Broadcasting Corporation from 2020 to 2022. He was on the board of wastewater utility Biofos from 2018 to 2022. He was a member of the municipal council in Lyngby-Taarbæk Municipality from 2018 to 2022 and was first deputy mayor from 2021 in a Conservative People's Party led administration.

Electoral history of Sigurd Agersnap
Election	Constituency	Party	Votes	Result
2013 local	Lyngby-Taarbæk Municipality	Socialist People's Party	131	Not elected
2017 local	Lyngby-Taarbæk Municipality	Socialist People's Party	1,114	Elected
2021 local	Lyngby-Taarbæk Municipality	Socialist People's Party	2,077	Elected
2022 general	Greater Copenhagen	Green Left	2,857	Elected
2026 general	Greater Copenhagen	Green Left	3,546	Elected
