= Sofie F. Villadsen =

Danish politician (born 1994)

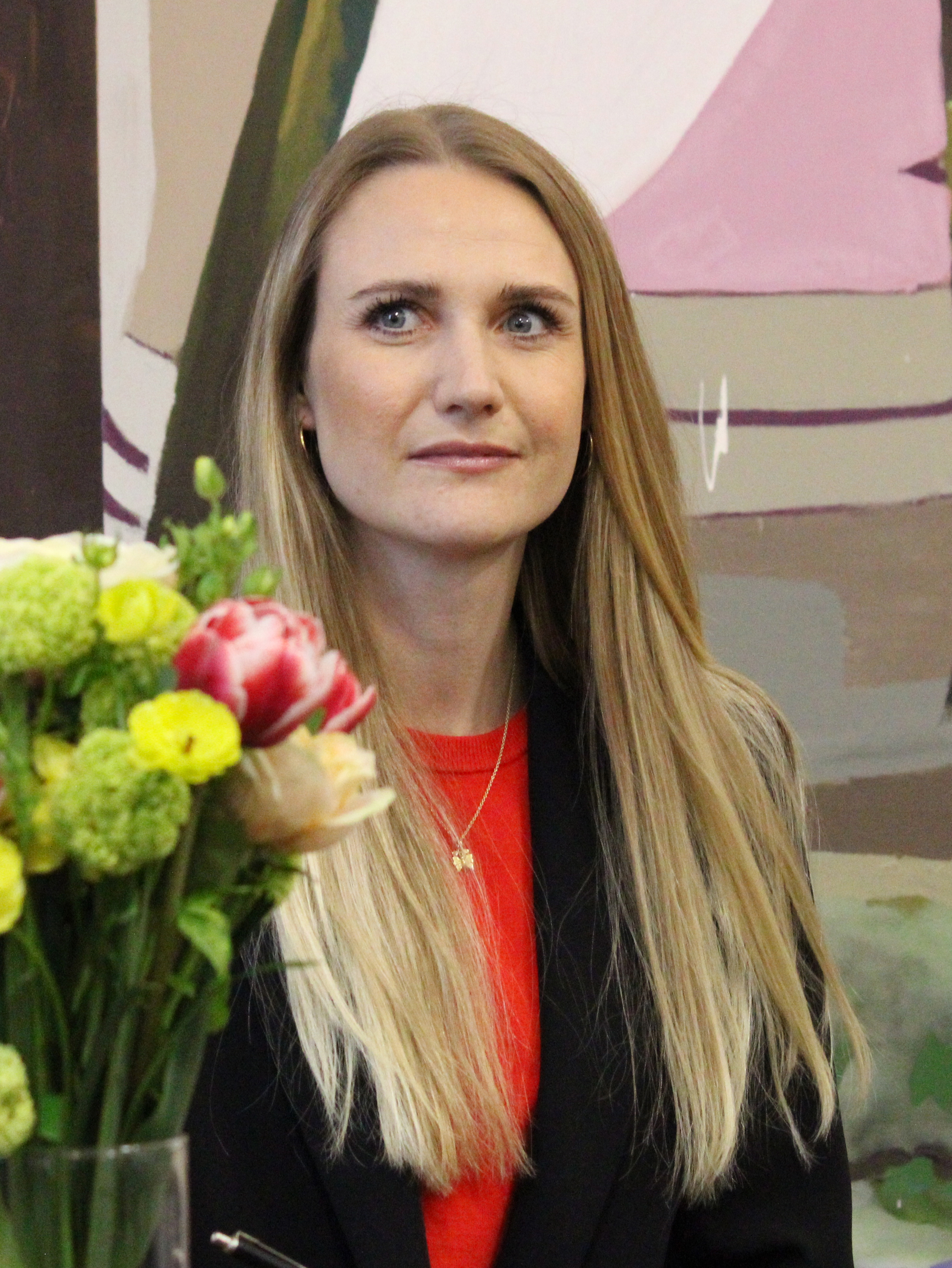
- Villadsen in 2026

Member of the Folketing
- Incumbent
- Assumed office 24 March 2026
- Constituency: Greater Copenhagen

Personal details
- Born: 27 February 1994 (age 32)
- Party: Green Left

Sofie Falck Villadsen (born 27 February 1994) is a Danish politician serving as a member of the Folketing since 2026. She has served as chairwoman of the Green Left in Hvidovre since 2023.

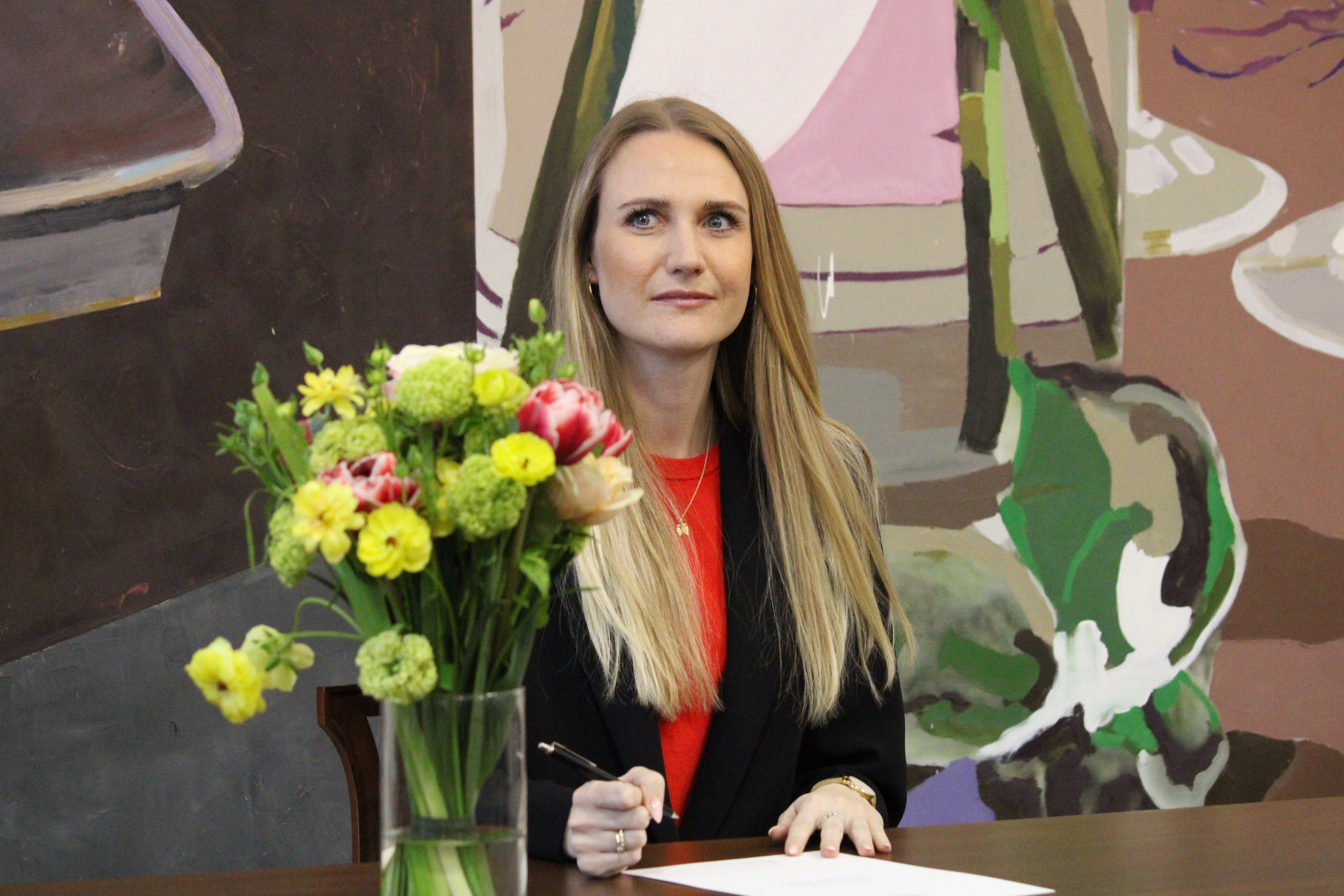
Villadsen signing a pledge to uphold the Danish Constitution at Christiansborg, 14 April 2026
