= Malte Larsen =

Danish politician (born 1968)

Member of the Folketing
- Incumbent
- Assumed office 5 June 2019
- Constituency: East Jutland

Personal details
- Born: 19 December 1968 (age 57) Copenhagen, Denmark
- Party: Social Democrats

Malte Larsen (born 19 December 1968) is a Danish politician, who is a member of the Folketing for the Social Democrats political party. He was elected into parliament in the 2019 Danish general election.

== Political career ==
Larsen has a background working with local politics. From 1994 to 2006 he was a member of the municipal council of Nørre Djurs Municipality. The municipality was merged with Grenå, Rougsø and part of Sønderhald Municipality in 2007 to form the new Norddjurs Municipality. He was a member of the municipal council in 2007. From 2010 to 2013 he was a member of the municipal council of Randers Municipality.

Larsen ran for parliament in the 2015 Danish general election, though was not elected. He received 3,449 personal votes, which made him the Social Democrats' primary substitute in the East Jutland constituency. He entered parliament as a substitute member four times during the 2015–2019 term. These periods were from 12 November 2015 to 18 March 2016 (substituting for Kirsten Brosbøl), from 19 March 2016 to 30 June 2017 (substituting for Maja Panduro), from 3 October 2017 to 30 November 2017 (substituting for Jens Joel) and from 15 January 2019 to 7 May 2019 (substituting for Maja Panduro). Larsen ran again in the 2019 election, where he was elected into parliament on his own mandate, receiving 5,708 votes.
