= Fatma Øktem =

Danish politician (born 1973)

Member of the Folketing
- Incumbent
- Assumed office 5 June 2019
- Constituency: East Jutland
- In office 15 September 2011 – 18 June 2015
- Constituency: East Jutland

Personal details
- Born: 18 December 1973 (age 52) Aarhus, Denmark
- Party: Venstre

Fatma Y. Øktem (born 18 December 1973 in Aarhus) is a Danish politician, who is a member of the Folketing for the Venstre political party. She was elected into parliament at the 2019 Danish general election and previously sat in parliament from 2011 to 2015.

== Political career ==
Øktem was first elected into parliament at the 2011 election. She was no reelected in the 2011 election, but became a substitute for Venstre in the East Jutland constituency. From 22 October to 6 November 2015 she substituted for Michael Aastrup Jensen in the Folketing. In the 2019 election she was elected into parliament on her own mandate again.
