= East Jutland (Folketing constituency) =

Constituency of the Folketing, the national legislature of Denmark

- Østjylland
- Constituency for the Folketing
- Location of East Jutland within Denmark
- Municipality: List: Aarhus; Favrskov; Hedensted; Horsens; Norddjurs; Odder; Randers; Samsø; Skanderborg; Syddjurs
- Region: Central Denmark
- Population: 851,232 (2026)
- Electorate: 618,682 (2026)
- Area: 4,992 km^{2} (2022)

Current constituency
- Created: 2007
- Seats: List: 19 (2026–present); 18 (2011–2022); 17 (2007–2011)
- Members of the Folketing: List: Kirsten Normann Andersen (F); Henrik Rejnholt Andersen (M); Louise Brown (I); Jakob Ellemann-Jensen (V); Camilla Fabricius (A); Torsten Gejl (Å); Peter Have (M); Leif Lahn Jensen (A); Michael Aastrup Jensen (V); Jens Joel (A); Mona Juul (C); Malte Larsen (A); Karin Liltorp (M); Sofie Lippert (F); Lars Boje Mathiesen (D); Jens Meilvang (I); Thomas Monberg (A); Charlotte Broman Mølbæk (F); Troels Lund Poulsen (V); Katrine Robsøe (B); Hans Kristian Skibby (Æ); Alex Vanopslagh (I); Mai Villadsen (Ø); Nicolai Wammen (A); Nick Zimmermann (O)
- Created from: Aarhus County; Vejle County; Viborg County

East Jutland (Danish: Østjylland) is one of the 12 multi-member constituencies of the Folketing, the national legislature of Denmark. The constituency was established in 2007 following the public administration structural reform. It consists of the municipalities of Aarhus, Favrskov, Hedensted, Horsens, Norddjurs, Odder, Randers, Samsø, Skanderborg and Syddjurs. The constituency currently elects 18 of the 179 members of the Folketing using the open party-list proportional representation electoral system. At the 2026 general election it had 618,682 registered electors.

== Electoral system ==
East Jutland currently elects 19 of the 179 members of the Folketing using the open party-list proportional representation electoral system. Constituency seats are allocated using the D'Hondt method. Compensatory seats are calculated based on the national vote and are allocated using the Sainte-Laguë method, initially at the provincial level and finally at the constituency level. Only parties that reach any one of three thresholds stipulated by section 77 of the Folketing (Parliamentary) Elections Act - winning at least one constituency seat; obtaining at least the Hare quota (valid votes in province/number of constituency seats in province) in two of the three provinces; or obtaining at least 2% of the national vote - compete for compensatory seats.

== Election results ==
=== Summary ===
Election	Red–Green Ø			Green Left F			Alternative Å			Social Democrats A			Social Liberals B			Venstre V			Conservative People's C			Liberal Alliance I / Y			Danish People's O		
Election	Votes	%	Seats	Votes	%	Seats	Votes	%	Seats	Votes	%	Seats	Votes	%	Seats	Votes	%	Seats	Votes	%	Seats	Votes	%	Seats	Votes	%	Seats
2026	33,055	6.33%	1	69,726	13.35%	3	10,948	2.10%	0	110,462	21.14%	5	37,121	7.11%	1	50,669	9.70%	2	40,485	7.75%	2	55,011	10.53%	2	34,707	6.64%	1
2022	28,798	5.69%	1	45,361	8.96%	2	19,174	3.79%	0	135,497	26.76%	6	23,453	4.63%	1	66,351	13.10%	3	23,637	4.67%	1	49,476	9.77%	2	9,908	1.96%	0
2019	35,261	7.11%	1	40,665	8.20%	2	16,915	3.41%	0	128,108	25.82%	6	49,157	9.91%	2	112,358	22.65%	5	28,431	5.73%	1	14,157	2.85%	0	38,889	7.84%	1
2015	35,960	7.43%	1	21,100	4.36%	0	29,587	6.11%	1	132,320	27.32%	6	23,876	4.93%	1	90,528	18.69%	4	13,490	2.79%	0	40,101	8.28%	1	91,621	18.92%	4
2011	30,471	6.32%	1	43,364	8.99%	1				131,338	27.22%	5	50,350	10.44%	2	131,674	27.29%	6	18,028	3.74%	0	23,682	4.91%	1	50,274	10.42%	2
2007	9,887	2.14%	0	61,496	13.30%	2				127,432	27.56%	6	24,921	5.39%	1	125,074	27.05%	5	40,068	8.67%	1	13,389	2.90%	0	56,218	12.16%	2

(Excludes compensatory seats)

=== Detailed ===
==== 2026 ====
Results of the 2026 general election held on 24 March 2026:

Party		Votes per nomination district											Total Votes	%	Seats		
Party		Aarhus East	Aarhus North	Aarhus South	Aarhus West	Djurs	Favrs- kov	Heden- sted	Hors- ens	Randers North	Randers South	Skander- borg	Total Votes	%	Con.	Com.	Tot.
Social Democrats	A	12,027	10,262	10,489	10,442	13,011	6,972	5,838	13,346	7,330	7,488	13,257	110,462	21.14%	5	1	6
Green Left	F	11,410	9,771	8,008	7,341	5,409	3,493	2,343	6,033	3,606	4,128	8,184	69,726	13.35%	3	0	3
Liberal Alliance	I	9,324	5,300	4,933	4,324	5,469	3,038	3,424	6,482	2,997	3,819	5,901	55,011	10.53%	2	0	2
Venstre	V	6,815	3,977	4,481	3,614	6,396	3,324	5,421	5,819	2,662	3,268	6,322	50,669	9.70%	2	1	3
Conservative People's Party	C	7,040	4,074	4,859	3,709	2,908	3,093	1,937	4,514	1,514	1,902	4,935	40,485	7.75%	2	0	2
Moderates	M	6,662	3,774	4,468	3,537	3,125	2,162	2,183	4,137	1,682	2,053	5,088	38,871	7.44%	1	1	2
Danish Social Liberal Party	B	8,582	6,455	4,809	5,097	1,648	1,627	1,937	2,321	819	992	3,977	37,121	7.11%	1	0	1
Danish People's Party	O	2,714	2,537	2,376	2,880	1,312	2,361	2,824	5,033	3,021	3,112	3,469	34,707	6.64%	1	1	2
Red–Green Alliance	Ø	6,625	6,442	3,940	5,205	2,053	1,041	586	2,369	1,006	1,138	2,650	33,055	6.33%	1	0	1
Denmark Democrats	Æ	1,110	1,103	1,115	1,484	4,433	2,239	3,198	3,121	2,553	2,391	2,843	25,590	4.90%	1	0	1
The Alternative	Å	3,172	2,635	2,038	1,704	1,580	585	308	959	402	540	2,098	15,600	2.99%	0	1	1
Citizens' Party	H	662	659	654	822	1,696	870	1,714	1,469	946	900	1,268	10,948	2.10%	0	1	1
Søren Skjold Andersen (Independent)		19	13	10	12	19	13	12	34	6	8	12	158	0.03%	0	0	0
Valid votes		76,162	57,002	52,180	50,171	50,697	30,818	29,867	54,257	28,544	31,739	59,586	522,403	100.00%	19	6	25
Blank votes		747	615	440	513	524	364	358	805	308	388	597	5,515	1.04%			
Rejected votes – other		141	149	114	176	130	54	85	202	113	100	121	1,369	0.26%			
Total polled		77,080	57,766	52,734	50,860	51,351	31,236	30,310	55,264	28,965	32,227	60,304	529,287	85.55%			
Registered electors		86,924	67,141	59,482	62,629	61,182	35,438	35,298	66,242	35,599	39,171	68,129	618,682				
Turnout		88.68%	86.04%	88.66%	81.21%	83.93%	88.14%	85.87%	83.43%	81.36%	82.27%	88.51%	85.55%				

The following candidates were elected:

- Constituency seats - Kirsten Normann Andersen (F), 9,526 votes; Camilla Fabricius (A), 5,876 votes; Charlotte Green (C), 1,425 votes; Leif Lahn Jensen (A), 6,837 votes; Mona Juul (C), 21,594 votes; Malte Larsen (A), 4,365 votes; Sofie Lippert (F), 4,516 votes; Louise Louring (V), 5,111 votes; Trine Mach (Ø) 10,455 votes; Jens Meilvang (I), 2,385 votes; Charlotte Broman Mølbæk (F), 4,356 votes; Thomas Monberg (A), 4,652 votes; Troels Lund Poulsen (V), 29,320 votes; Katrine Robsøe (B), 6,406 votes; Hans Kristian Skibby (Æ), 1,818 votes; Caroline Stage (M), 3,751 votes; Alex Vanopslagh (I), 38,487 votes; Nicolai Wammen (A), 19,203 votes; and Nick Zimmermann (O), 6,007 votes.
- Compensatory seats - Mathilde Hjort Bressum (V), 3,707 votes; Christina Egelund (M), 3,549 votes; Torsten Gejl (Å), 3,316 votes; Anders Kühnau (A), 4,043 votes; Lars Boje Mathiesen (H), 8,408 votes; and Michael Nedersøe (O), 2,075 votes.

==== 2022 ====
Results of the 2022 general election held on 1 November 2022:

Party		Votes per nomination district											Total Votes	%	Seats		
Party		Aarhus East	Aarhus North	Aarhus South	Aarhus West	Djurs	Favrs- kov	Heden- sted	Hors- ens	Randers North	Randers South	Skander- borg	Total Votes	%	Con.	Com.	Tot.
Social Democrats	A	12,826	11,808	12,296	13,291	15,927	8,650	7,448	16,707	10,395	10,224	15,925	135,497	26.76%	6	0	6
Venstre	V	8,822	5,217	6,721	5,337	6,396	4,555	5,411	7,242	3,755	4,757	8,138	66,351	13.10%	3	0	3
Liberal Alliance	I	9,330	5,127	5,014	4,379	4,403	2,461	2,810	5,438	2,317	2,972	5,225	49,476	9.77%	2	1	3
Green Left	F	7,853	6,801	5,799	5,101	3,427	2,227	1,210	3,540	1,729	2,126	5,548	45,361	8.96%	2	1	3
Moderates	M	7,316	4,382	4,875	4,125	3,650	2,542	2,633	4,991	1,801	2,189	5,450	43,954	8.68%	1	2	3
Denmark Democrats	Æ	1,760	1,654	1,903	2,270	5,861	2,975	4,066	4,906	3,115	2,881	4,218	35,609	7.03%	1	0	1
Red–Green Alliance	Ø	6,236	5,310	3,723	3,610	2,079	929	532	1,905	892	1,060	2,522	28,798	5.69%	1	0	1
Conservative People's Party	C	3,690	2,206	2,573	2,121	1,893	1,889	1,264	2,634	959	1,252	3,156	23,637	4.67%	1	0	1
Danish Social Liberal Party	B	5,622	4,212	3,181	2,673	1,115	1,046	490	1,541	548	682	2,343	23,453	4.63%	1	0	1
The Alternative	Å	4,393	3,273	2,652	2,048	1,666	624	341	1,042	436	601	2,098	19,174	3.79%	0	1	1
The New Right	D	1,229	1,048	1,096	1,320	2,671	1,475	1,714	2,333	1,427	1,500	2,072	17,885	3.53%	0	1	1
Danish People's Party	O	655	623	735	805	1,312	695	785	1,477	971	850	1,000	9,908	1.96%	0	1	1
Independent Greens	Q	397	851	261	1,821	105	63	45	200	122	53	139	4,057	0.80%	0	0	0
Christian Democrats	K	230	330	192	301	176	125	510	254	172	207	226	2,723	0.54%	0	0	0
Jesper Antonsen (Independent)		41	48	29	31	51	25	24	39	21	28	53	390	0.08%	0	0	0
Chresten H. Ibsen (Independent)		8	16	8	22	12	3	2	8	4	1	8	92	0.02%	0	0	0
Valid votes		70,408	52,906	51,058	49,255	50,744	30,284	29,285	54,257	28,664	31,383	58,121	506,365	100.00%	18	7	25
Blank votes		912	823	568	686	616	410	390	805	347	435	640	6,632	1.29%			
Rejected votes – other		239	184	161	195	190	75	90	202	101	116	170	1,723	0.33%			
Total polled		71,559	53,913	51,787	50,136	51,550	30,769	29,765	55,264	29,112	31,934	58,931	514,720	85.38%			
Registered electors		81,044	63,318	58,440	62,229	61,581	34,887	34,543	66,242	35,669	38,675	66,242	602,870				
Turnout		88.30%	85.15%	88.62%	80.57%	83.71%	88.20%	86.17%	83.43%	81.62%	82.57%	88.96%	85.38%				

Votes per municipality:

Party		Votes per municipality										Total Votes
Party		Aarhus	Favrs- kov	Heden- sted	Hors- ens	Nord- djurs	Odder	Randers	Samsø	Skander- borg	Syd- djurs	Total Votes
Social Democrats	A	50,221	8,650	7,448	16,707	7,914	4,452	20,619	634	10,839	8,013	135,497
Venstre	V	26,097	4,555	5,411	7,242	2,727	2,092	8,512	230	5,816	3,669	66,351
Liberal Alliance	I	23,850	2,461	2,810	5,438	2,225	1,115	5,289	132	3,978	2,178	49,476
Green Left	F	25,554	2,227	1,210	3,540	1,190	1,510	3,855	273	3,765	2,237	45,361
Moderates	M	20,698	2,542	2,633	4,991	1,345	1,307	3,990	152	3,991	2,305	43,954
Denmark Democrats	Æ	7,587	2,975	4,066	4,906	2,937	1,170	5,996	202	2,846	2,924	35,609
Red–Green Alliance	Ø	18,879	929	532	1,905	735	761	1,952	170	1,591	1,344	28,798
Conservative People's Party	C	10,590	1,889	1,264	2,634	708	754	2,211	410	1,992	1,185	23,637
Danish Social Liberal Party	B	15,688	1,046	490	1,541	343	499	1,230	53	1,791	772	23,453
The Alternative	Å	12,366	624	341	1,042	402	543	1,037	145	1,410	1,264	19,174
The New Right	D	4,693	1,475	1,714	2,333	1,374	535	2,927	68	1,469	1,297	17,885
Danish People's Party	O	2,818	695	785	1,477	640	256	1,821	35	709	672	9,908
Independent Greens	Q	3,330	63	45	200	50	25	175	3	111	55	4,057
Christian Democrats	K	1,053	125	510	254	88	68	379	5	153	88	2,723
Jesper Antonsen (Independent)		149	25	24	39	25	16	49	4	33	26	390
Chresten H. Ibsen (Independent)		54	3	2	8	7	4	5	0	4	5	92
Valid votes		223,627	30,284	29,285	54,257	22,710	15,107	60,047	2,516	40,498	28,034	506,365
Blank votes		2,989	410	390	805	275	166	782	27	447	341	6,632
Rejected votes – other		779	75	90	202	77	43	217	11	116	113	1,723
Total polled		227,395	30,769	29,765	55,264	23,062	15,316	61,046	2,554	41,061	28,488	514,720
Registered electors		265,031	34,887	34,543	66,242	28,316	17,469	74,344	2,940	45,833	33,265	602,870
Turnout		85.80%	88.20%	86.17%	83.43%	81.45%	87.68%	82.11%	86.87%	89.59%	85.64%	85.38%

The following candidates were elected:

- Constituency seats - Kirsten Normann Andersen (F), 8,693 votes; Jakob Ellemann-Jensen (V), 32,859 votes; Tobias Grotkjær Elmstrøm (M), 4,085 votes; Camilla Fabricius (A), 4,510 votes; Leif Lahn Jensen (A), 7,443 votes; Michael Aastrup Jensen (V), 8,195 votes; Jens Joel (A), 6,418 votes; Mona Juul (C), 3,695 votes; Malte Larsen (A), 6,313 votes; Jens Meilvang (I), 1,642 votes; Charlotte Broman Mølbæk (F), 2,982 votes; Thomas Monberg (A), 5,479 votes; Troels Lund Poulsen (V), 6,863 votes; Katrine Robsøe (B), 3,736 votes; Hans Kristian Skibby (Æ), 3,112 votes; Alex Vanopslagh (I), 38,284 votes; Mai Villadsen (Ø) 14,631 votes; and Nicolai Wammen (A), 18,022 votes.
- Compensatory seats - Louise Brown (I), 1,085 votes; Torsten Gejl (Å), 3,444 votes; Peter Have (M), 952 votes; Karin Liltorp (M), 3,375 votes; Sofie Lippert (F), 2,338 votes; Lars Boje Mathiesen (D), 11,150 votes; and Nick Zimmermann (O), 1,039 votes.

==== 2019 ====
Results of the 2019 general election held on 5 June 2019:

Party		Votes per nomination district											Total Votes	%	Seats		
Party		Aarhus East	Aarhus North	Aarhus South	Aarhus West	Djurs	Favrs- kov	Heden- sted	Hors- ens	Randers North	Randers South	Skander- borg	Total Votes	%	Con.	Com.	Tot.
Social Democrats	A	11,725	12,408	11,975	13,059	14,886	8,400	6,917	14,601	9,918	9,499	14,720	128,108	25.82%	6	1	7
Venstre	V	12,564	8,446	11,010	8,404	12,700	8,199	9,024	12,437	7,084	8,290	14,200	112,358	22.65%	5	1	6
Danish Social Liberal Party	B	9,771	8,245	6,290	7,285	2,630	2,100	1,205	3,627	1,534	1,603	4,867	49,157	9.91%	2	1	3
Socialist People's Party	F	6,446	5,968	5,147	4,458	3,630	1,852	1,258	3,411	1,793	2,089	4,613	40,665	8.20%	2	0	2
Danish People's Party	O	2,269	2,332	2,609	3,315	5,213	2,748	4,127	6,042	2,881	2,917	4,436	38,889	7.84%	1	1	2
Red–Green Alliance	Ø	6,359	5,963	4,417	4,709	2,744	1,302	905	2,672	1,392	1,564	3,234	35,261	7.11%	1	0	1
Conservative People's Party	C	4,287	2,705	3,310	2,527	2,252	2,087	1,569	3,208	1,208	1,424	3,854	28,431	5.73%	1	0	1
The Alternative	Å	3,739	2,948	2,168	1,809	1,288	630	373	1,075	406	667	1,812	16,915	3.41%	0	1	1
Liberal Alliance	I	2,781	1,811	1,492	1,191	1,370	645	706	1,647	513	709	1,292	14,157	2.85%	0	1	1
Christian Democrats	K	1,118	1,415	928	1,149	831	569	1,390	890	519	795	1,013	10,617	2.14%	0	0	0
The New Right	D	967	827	945	992	1,154	619	695	1,253	575	686	1,084	9,797	1.97%	0	1	1
Hard Line	P	593	666	558	749	904	493	575	1,148	555	555	688	7,484	1.51%	0	0	0
Klaus Riskær Pedersen	E	465	418	343	322	442	193	235	442	170	229	415	3,674	0.74%	0	0	0
Chresten H. Ibsen (Independent)		53	70	47	78	41	31	18	53	19	23	56	489	0.10%	0	0	0
Hans Schultz (Independent)		7	10	8	7	4	4	2	9	1	3	5	60	0.01%	0	0	0
Valid votes		63,144	54,232	51,247	50,054	50,089	29,872	28,999	52,515	28,568	31,053	56,289	496,062	100.00%	18	7	25
Blank votes		472	438	366	400	410	258	282	464	220	266	429	4,005	0.80%			
Rejected votes – other		135	141	124	146	114	44	77	159	69	63	92	1,164	0.23%			
Total polled		63,751	54,811	51,737	50,600	50,613	30,174	29,358	53,138	28,857	31,382	56,810	501,231	85.78%			
Registered electors		71,780	63,416	58,277	60,335	61,238	34,436	34,129	63,450	35,326	38,059	63,901	584,347				
Turnout		88.81%	86.43%	88.78%	83.87%	82.65%	87.62%	86.02%	83.75%	81.69%	82.46%	88.90%	85.78%				

Votes per municipality:

Party		Votes per municipality										Total Votes
Party		Aarhus	Favrs- kov	Heden- sted	Hors- ens	Nord- djurs	Odder	Randers	Samsø	Skander- borg	Syd- djurs	Total Votes
Social Democrats	A	49,167	8,400	6,917	14,601	7,496	3,961	19,417	638	10,121	7,390	128,108
Venstre	V	40,424	8,199	9,024	12,437	5,647	3,604	15,374	586	10,010	7,053	112,358
Danish Social Liberal Party	B	31,591	2,100	1,205	3,627	811	1,120	3,137	124	3,623	1,819	49,157
Socialist People's Party	F	22,019	1,852	1,258	3,411	1,567	1,236	3,882	216	3,161	2,063	40,665
Danish People's Party	O	10,525	2,748	4,127	6,042	2,587	1,111	5,798	196	3,129	2,626	38,889
Red–Green Alliance	Ø	21,448	1,302	905	2,672	1,107	944	2,956	230	2,060	1,637	35,261
Conservative People's Party	C	12,829	2,087	1,569	3,208	807	1,186	2,632	170	2,498	1,445	28,431
The Alternative	Å	10,664	630	373	1,075	410	423	1,073	98	1,291	878	16,915
Liberal Alliance	I	7,275	645	706	1,647	826	240	1,222	52	1,000	544	14,157
Christian Democrats	K	4,610	569	1,390	890	402	265	1,314	46	702	429	10,617
The New Right	D	3,731	619	695	1,253	581	267	1,261	34	783	573	9,797
Hard Line	P	2,566	493	575	1,148	471	194	1,110	30	464	433	7,484
Klaus Riskær Pedersen	E	1,548	193	235	442	193	97	399	20	298	249	3,674
Chresten H. Ibsen (Independent)		248	31	18	53	18	16	42	0	40	23	489
Hans Schultz (Independent)		32	4	2	9	0	1	4	1	3	4	60
Valid votes		218,677	29,872	28,999	52,515	22,923	14,665	59,621	2,441	39,183	27,166	496,062
Blank votes		1,676	258	282	464	203	113	486	34	282	207	4,005
Rejected votes – other		546	44	77	159	45	18	132	8	66	69	1,164
Total polled		220,899	30,174	29,358	53,138	23,171	14,796	60,239	2,483	39,531	27,442	501,231
Registered electors		253,808	34,436	34,129	63,450	28,798	16,785	73,385	2,914	44,202	32,440	584,347
Turnout		87.03%	87.62%	86.02%	83.75%	80.46%	88.15%	82.09%	85.21%	89.43%	84.59%	85.78%

The following candidates were elected:

- Constituency seats - Kirsten Normann Andersen (F), 7,885 votes; Britt Bager (V), 17,725 votes; Jakob Ellemann-Jensen (V), 36,354 votes; Camilla Fabricius (A), 11,812 votes; Leif Lahn Jensen (A), 12,967 votes; Michael Aastrup Jensen (V), 18,423 votes; Jens Joel (A), 11,129 votes; Mona Juul (C), 9,820 votes; Henrik Dam Kristensen (A), 14,878 votes; Malte Larsen (A), 10,596 votes; Charlotte Broman Mølbæk (F), 2,641 votes; Fatma Øktem (V), 9,436 votes; Morten Østergaard (B), 17,781 votes; Troels Lund Poulsen (V), 12,063 votes; Katrine Robsøe (B), 3,430 votes; Hans Kristian Skibby (O), 2,834 votes; Nikolaj Villumsen (Ø) 6,254 votes; and Nicolai Wammen (A), 42,498 votes.
- Compensatory seats - Heidi Bank (V), 5,651 votes; Anne Sophie Callesen (B), 1,926 votes; Mette Dencker (O), 2,348 votes; Torsten Gejl (Å), 1,383 votes; Daniel Toft Jakobsen (A), 8,737 votes; Lars Boje Mathiesen (D), 2,396 votes; and Ole Birk Olesen (I), 2,020 votes.

==== 2015 ====
Results of the 2015 general election held on 18 June 2015:

Party		Votes per nomination district											Total Votes	%	Seats		
Party		Aarhus East	Aarhus North	Aarhus South	Aarhus West	Djurs	Favrs- kov	Heden- sted	Hors- ens	Randers North	Randers South	Skander- borg	Total Votes	%	Con.	Com.	Tot.
Social Democrats	A	13,362	14,067	13,623	14,570	13,935	8,185	6,399	13,900	9,741	9,287	15,251	132,320	27.32%	6	1	7
Danish People's Party	O	5,706	6,000	6,483	7,884	12,749	6,696	8,922	12,878	6,989	7,237	10,077	91,621	18.92%	4	1	5
Venstre	V	9,599	7,028	8,909	7,091	10,666	6,770	7,138	9,634	5,638	6,397	11,658	90,528	18.69%	4	0	4
Liberal Alliance	I	6,650	4,507	4,902	3,362	3,039	2,026	2,413	5,098	1,679	2,176	4,249	40,101	8.28%	1	1	2
Red–Green Alliance	Ø	5,432	5,615	4,044	4,730	2,986	1,479	1,106	3,454	1,990	1,991	3,133	35,960	7.43%	1	1	2
The Alternative	Å	6,082	4,732	4,064	3,410	2,558	1,140	664	1,819	774	1,060	3,284	29,587	6.11%	1	0	1
Danish Social Liberal Party	B	4,881	4,018	3,375	2,555	1,258	1,270	741	1,808	676	857	2,437	23,876	4.93%	1	0	1
Socialist People's Party	F	2,932	2,982	2,509	2,355	2,519	1,100	721	1,914	916	945	2,207	21,100	4.36%	0	1	1
Conservative People's Party	C	1,936	1,350	1,655	1,325	1,178	953	655	1,293	664	818	1,663	13,490	2.79%	0	1	1
Christian Democrats	K	486	826	349	569	239	217	694	309	232	378	328	4,627	0.96%	0	0	0
Yahya Hassan (Independent)		165	199	106	178	35	16	26	78	37	55	49	944	0.19%	0	0	0
Peter Ymer Nielsen (Independent)		6	8	21	19	8	8	2	2	6	4	15	99	0.02%	0	0	0
Poul Gundersen (Independent)		10	7	5	7	4	3	2	2	4	3	5	52	0.01%	0	0	0
Valid votes		57,247	51,339	50,045	48,055	51,174	29,863	29,483	52,189	29,346	31,208	54,356	484,305	100.00%	18	6	24
Blank votes		521	550	420	446	407	278	252	483	254	258	427	4,296	0.88%			
Rejected votes – other		183	134	125	164	147	79	94	212	86	89	100	1,413	0.29%			
Total polled		57,951	52,023	50,590	48,665	51,728	30,220	29,829	52,884	29,686	31,555	54,883	490,014	86.69%			
Registered electors		65,666	60,307	56,803	58,372	60,784	33,970	33,766	61,563	35,230	37,519	61,279	565,259				
Turnout		88.25%	86.26%	89.06%	83.37%	85.10%	88.96%	88.34%	85.90%	84.26%	84.10%	89.56%	86.69%				

Votes per municipality:

Party		Votes per municipality										Total Votes
Party		Aarhus	Favrs- kov	Heden- sted	Hors- ens	Nord- djurs	Odder	Randers	Samsø	Skander- borg	Syd- djurs	Total Votes
Social Democrats	A	55,622	8,185	6,399	13,900	7,127	4,297	19,028	692	10,262	6,808	132,320
Danish People's Party	O	26,073	6,696	8,922	12,878	6,474	2,505	14,226	446	7,126	6,275	91,621
Venstre	V	32,627	6,770	7,138	9,634	5,099	3,237	12,035	532	7,889	5,567	90,528
Liberal Alliance	I	19,421	2,026	2,413	5,098	1,186	936	3,855	125	3,188	1,853	40,101
Red–Green Alliance	Ø	19,821	1,479	1,106	3,454	1,470	841	3,981	203	2,089	1,516	35,960
The Alternative	Å	18,288	1,140	664	1,819	921	920	1,834	185	2,179	1,637	29,587
Danish Social Liberal Party	B	14,829	1,270	741	1,808	428	531	1,533	57	1,849	830	23,876
Socialist People's Party	F	10,778	1,100	721	1,914	867	575	1,861	115	1,517	1,652	21,100
Conservative People's Party	C	6,266	953	655	1,293	469	411	1,482	108	1,144	709	13,490
Christian Democrats	K	2,230	217	694	309	132	90	610	7	231	107	4,627
Yahya Hassan (Independent)		648	16	26	78	18	11	92	0	38	17	944
Peter Ymer Nielsen (Independent)		54	8	2	2	3	3	10	0	12	5	99
Poul Gundersen (Independent)		29	3	2	2	1	0	7	0	5	3	52
Valid votes		206,686	29,863	29,483	52,189	24,195	14,357	60,554	2,470	37,529	26,979	484,305
Blank votes		1,937	278	252	483	210	112	512	14	301	197	4,296
Rejected votes – other		606	79	94	212	75	25	175	7	68	72	1,413
Total polled		209,229	30,220	29,829	52,884	24,480	14,494	61,241	2,491	37,898	27,248	490,014
Registered electors		241,148	33,970	33,766	61,563	29,325	16,279	72,749	2,928	42,072	31,459	565,259
Turnout		86.76%	88.96%	88.34%	85.90%	83.48%	89.03%	84.18%	85.08%	90.08%	86.61%	86.69%

The following candidates were elected:

- Constituency seats - Britt Bager (V), 13,820 votes; Tilde Bork (O), 11,686 votes; Kirsten Brosbøl (A), 18,970 votes; Hans Kristian Bundgaard-Skibby (O), 15,310 votes; Kim Christiansen (O), 10,712 votes; Mette Hjermind Dencker (O), 23,171 votes; Jakob Ellemann-Jensen (V), 17,625 votes; Josephine Fock (Å), 11,456 votes; Leif Lahn Jensen (A), 11,793 votes; Michael Aastrup Jensen (V), 10,995 votes; Jens Joel (A), 13,081 votes; Henrik Dam Kristensen (A), 15,790 votes; Ole Birk Olesen (I), 20,580 votes; Morten Østergaard (B), 14,534 votes; Maja Panduro (A), 14,738 votes; Troels Lund Poulsen (V), 9,634 votes; Nikolaj Villumsen (Ø) 6,415 votes; and Nicolai Wammen (A), 37,903 votes.
- Compensatory seats - Carsten Bach (I), 6,459 votes; Jonas Dahl (F), 5,316 votes; Claus Kvist Hansen (O), 6,251 votes; Daniel Toft Jakobsen (A), 8,353 votes; Naser Khader (C), 7,374 votes; and Søren Egge Rasmussen (Ø) 5,320 votes.

==== 2011 ====
Results of the 2011 general election held on 15 September 2011:

Party		Votes per nomination district											Total Votes	%	Seats		
Party		Aarhus East	Aarhus North	Aarhus South	Aarhus West	Djurs	Favrs- kov	Heden- sted	Hors- ens	Randers North	Randers South	Skander- borg	Total Votes	%	Con.	Com.	Tot.
Venstre	V	13,012	9,689	12,752	10,669	15,494	9,814	11,063	14,855	8,286	9,337	16,703	131,674	27.29%	6	1	7
Social Democrats	A	11,858	13,960	12,908	14,810	14,963	7,972	6,250	13,595	10,966	10,081	13,975	131,338	27.22%	5	2	7
Danish Social Liberal Party	B	9,110	7,568	6,501	5,591	3,847	2,578	1,833	4,242	1,619	2,160	5,301	50,350	10.44%	2	1	3
Danish People's Party	O	3,262	3,785	3,835	4,832	6,775	3,512	4,636	6,851	3,635	3,730	5,421	50,274	10.42%	2	1	3
Socialist People's Party	F	5,760	6,056	4,705	4,872	4,031	2,166	1,844	4,521	2,259	2,254	4,896	43,364	8.99%	1	1	2
Red–Green Alliance	Ø	5,307	5,057	3,673	3,908	2,540	1,140	863	2,508	1,250	1,400	2,825	30,471	6.32%	1	0	1
Liberal Alliance	I	3,410	2,651	2,592	2,015	2,036	1,301	1,609	3,272	983	1,294	2,519	23,682	4.91%	1	0	1
Conservative People's Party	C	2,458	1,831	2,253	1,750	1,667	1,303	985	1,770	822	989	2,200	18,028	3.74%	0	1	1
Christian Democrats	K	329	451	224	315	250	163	476	252	171	250	209	3,090	0.64%	0	0	0
Ibrahim Gøkhan (Independent)		8	27	6	45	4	1	1	9	2	3	4	110	0.02%	0	0	0
Janus Kramer (Independent)		13	26	9	9	9	7	2	5	1	4	9	94	0.02%	0	0	0
Valid votes		54,527	51,101	49,458	48,816	51,616	29,957	29,562	51,880	29,994	31,502	54,062	482,475	100.00%	18	7	25
Blank votes		325	330	278	314	329	180	232	393	167	191	263	3,002	0.62%			
Rejected votes – other		145	137	117	164	150	67	85	178	89	94	106	1,332	0.27%			
Total polled		54,997	51,568	49,853	49,294	52,095	30,204	29,879	52,451	30,250	31,787	54,431	486,809	88.50%			
Registered electors		61,334	58,284	55,076	56,520	60,254	33,558	33,357	59,588	35,018	36,819	60,242	550,050				
Turnout		89.67%	88.48%	90.52%	87.22%	86.46%	90.01%	89.57%	88.02%	86.38%	86.33%	90.35%	88.50%				

Votes per municipality:

Party		Votes per municipality										Total Votes
Party		Aarhus	Favrs- kov	Heden- sted	Hors- ens	Nord- djurs	Odder	Randers	Samsø	Skander- borg	Syd- djurs	Total Votes
Venstre	V	46,122	9,814	11,063	14,855	7,157	4,310	17,623	740	11,653	8,337	131,674
Social Democrats	A	53,536	7,972	6,250	13,595	7,740	3,936	21,047	611	9,428	7,223	131,338
Danish Social Liberal Party	B	28,770	2,578	1,833	4,242	1,462	1,328	3,779	201	3,772	2,385	50,350
Danish People's Party	O	15,714	3,512	4,636	6,851	3,359	1,398	7,365	265	3,758	3,416	50,274
Socialist People's Party	F	21,393	2,166	1,844	4,521	1,739	1,410	4,513	370	3,116	2,292	43,364
Red–Green Alliance	Ø	17,945	1,140	863	2,508	1,121	773	2,650	240	1,812	1,419	30,471
Liberal Alliance	I	10,668	1,301	1,609	3,272	951	559	2,277	80	1,880	1,085	23,682
Conservative People's Party	C	8,292	1,303	985	1,770	663	587	1,811	140	1,473	1,004	18,028
Christian Democrats	K	1,319	163	476	252	150	67	421	5	137	100	3,090
Ibrahim Gøkhan (Independent)		86	1	1	9	0	2	5	0	2	4	110
Janus Kramer (Independent)		57	7	2	5	5	2	5	0	7	4	94
Valid votes		203,902	29,957	29,562	51,880	24,347	14,372	61,496	2,652	37,038	27,269	482,475
Blank votes		1,247	180	232	393	179	64	358	20	179	150	3,002
Rejected votes – other		563	67	85	178	69	22	183	11	73	81	1,332
Total polled		205,712	30,204	29,879	52,451	24,595	14,458	62,037	2,683	37,290	27,500	486,809
Registered electors		231,214	33,558	33,357	59,588	28,979	16,050	71,837	3,069	41,123	31,275	550,050
Turnout		88.97%	90.01%	89.57%	88.02%	84.87%	90.08%	86.36%	87.42%	90.68%	87.93%	88.50%

The following candidates were elected:

- Constituency seats - Kim Andersen (V), 9,896 votes; Liv Holm Andersen (B), 6,839 votes; Kirsten Brosbøl (A), 11,285 votes; Anne-Mette Winther Christiansen (V), 7,830 votes; Kim Christiansen (O), 10,004 votes; Per Clausen (Ø) 6,525 votes; Jonas Dahl (F), 8,280 votes; Lykke Friis (V), 57,428 votes; Leif Lahn Jensen (A), 10,785 votes; Michael Aastrup Jensen (V), 16,352 votes; Karen Jespersen (V), 9,080 votes; Henrik Dam Kristensen (A), 14,159 votes; Ole Birk Olesen (I), 14,120 votes; Morten Østergaard (B), 25,047 votes; Maja Panduro (A), 11,609 votes; Troels Lund Poulsen (V), 18,122 votes; Hans Kristian Skibby (O), 8,801 votes; and Nicolai Wammen (A), 51,399 votes.
- Compensatory seats - Eigil Andersen (F), 4,295 votes; Tom Behnke (C), 7,191 votes; Mette Hjermind Dencker (O), 8,579 votes; Torben Hansen (A), 7,853 votes; Jens Joel (A), 8,397 votes; Jeppe Mikkelsen (B), 4,696 votes; Fatma Øktem (V), 6,151 votes;

==== 2007 ====
Results of the 2007 general election held on 13 November 2007:

Party		Votes per nomination district											Total Votes	%	Seats		
Party		Aarhus East	Aarhus North	Aarhus South	Aarhus West	Djurs	Favrs- kov	Heden- sted	Hors- ens	Randers North	Randers South	Skander- borg	Total Votes	%	Con.	Com.	Tot.
Social Democrats	A	12,398	14,197	12,577	14,431	13,770	7,343	5,756	13,610	10,215	9,307	13,828	127,432	27.56%	6	1	7
Venstre	V	11,178	8,390	11,171	9,694	15,541	9,406	11,382	15,154	8,159	9,035	15,964	125,074	27.05%	5	1	6
Socialist People's Party	F	9,505	9,365	7,376	7,208	5,514	2,674	2,360	5,536	2,759	2,918	6,281	61,496	13.30%	2	1	3
Danish People's Party	O	3,666	4,418	4,364	5,691	7,717	3,708	4,757	7,247	4,313	4,389	5,948	56,218	12.16%	2	1	3
Conservative People's Party	C	5,402	3,854	4,806	3,701	4,025	2,634	2,311	4,131	1,935	2,441	4,828	40,068	8.67%	1	1	2
Danish Social Liberal Party	B	4,846	3,809	3,352	2,420	1,863	1,428	868	1,788	897	993	2,657	24,921	5.39%	1	0	1
New Alliance	Y	1,964	1,643	1,574	1,351	1,074	796	621	1,605	522	593	1,646	13,389	2.90%	0	1	1
Unity List	Ø	1,994	1,836	1,198	1,788	650	294	186	557	268	290	826	9,887	2.14%	0	1	1
Christian Democrats	K	412	611	321	417	278	178	531	271	204	322	275	3,820	0.83%	0	0	0
Janus Kramer Møller (Independent)		6	15	13	11	12	5	3	8	2	8	11	94	0.02%	0	0	0
Valid votes		51,371	48,138	46,752	46,712	50,444	28,466	28,775	49,907	29,274	30,296	52,264	462,399	100.00%	17	7	24
Blank votes		218	248	206	192	237	145	171	253	124	132	211	2,137	0.46%			
Rejected votes – other		90	86	75	124	97	44	53	126	57	65	65	882	0.19%			
Total polled		51,679	48,472	47,033	47,028	50,778	28,655	28,999	50,286	29,455	30,493	52,540	465,418	87.33%			
Registered electors		58,257	55,541	52,650	54,494	59,697	32,493	32,796	58,088	34,551	35,875	58,527	532,969				
Turnout		88.71%	87.27%	89.33%	86.30%	85.06%	88.19%	88.42%	86.57%	85.25%	85.00%	89.77%	87.33%				

Votes per municipality:

Party		Votes per municipality										Total Votes
Party		Aarhus	Favrs- kov	Heden- sted	Hors- ens	Nord- djurs	Odder	Randers	Samsø	Skander- borg	Syd- djurs	Total Votes
Social Democrats	A	53,603	7,343	5,756	13,610	7,081	3,953	19,522	675	9,200	6,689	127,432
Venstre	V	40,433	9,406	11,382	15,154	7,489	4,128	17,194	790	11,046	8,052	125,074
Socialist People's Party	F	33,454	2,674	2,360	5,536	2,385	1,802	5,677	391	4,088	3,129	61,496
Danish People's Party	O	18,139	3,708	4,757	7,247	3,838	1,476	8,702	327	4,145	3,879	56,218
Conservative People's Party	C	17,763	2,634	2,311	4,131	1,704	1,269	4,376	224	3,335	2,321	40,068
Danish Social Liberal Party	B	14,427	1,428	868	1,788	745	708	1,890	130	1,819	1,118	24,921
New Alliance	Y	6,532	796	621	1,605	402	380	1,115	72	1,194	672	13,389
Unity List	Ø	6,816	294	186	557	293	216	558	79	531	357	9,887
Christian Democrats	K	1,761	178	531	271	146	76	526	14	185	132	3,820
Janus Kramer Møller (Independent)		45	5	3	8	7	4	10	1	6	5	94
Valid votes		192,973	28,466	28,775	49,907	24,090	14,012	59,570	2,703	35,549	26,354	462,399
Blank votes		864	145	171	253	106	55	256	12	144	131	2,137
Rejected votes – other		375	44	53	126	37	16	122	3	46	60	882
Total polled		194,212	28,655	28,999	50,286	24,233	14,083	59,948	2,718	35,739	26,545	465,418
Registered electors		220,942	32,493	32,796	58,088	29,064	15,692	70,426	3,182	39,653	30,633	532,969
Turnout		87.90%	88.19%	88.42%	86.57%	83.38%	89.75%	85.12%	85.42%	90.13%	86.65%	87.33%

The following candidates were elected:

- Constituency seats - Eigil Andersen (F), 6,601 votes; Kim Andersen (V), 13,097 votes; Svend Auken (A), 43,122 votes; René Skau Björnsson (A), 7,820 votes; Kirsten Brosbøl (A), 13,564 votes; Anne-Mette Winther Christiansen (V), 10,907 votes; Pernille Frahm (F), 15,130 votes; Torben Hansen (A), 10,824 votes; Leif Lahn Jensen (A), 9,778 votes; Michael Aastrup Jensen (V), 19,030 votes; Karen Jespersen (V), 28,681 votes; Henriette Kjær (C), 22,919 votes; Henrik Dam Kristensen (A), 19,500 votes; Morten Messerschmidt (O), 32,521 votes; Morten Østergaard (B), 9,096 votes; Troels Lund Poulsen (V), 17,693 votes; and Hans Kristian Skibby (O), 7,421 votes.
- Compensatory seats - Tom Behnke (C), 8,434 votes; Kim Christiansen (O), 3,532 votes; Per Clausen (Ø) 2,227 votes; Jonas Dahl (F), 7,296 votes; Anne-Marie Meldgaard (A), 7,631 votes; Anders Samuelsen (Y), 11,218 votes; and Eyvind Vesselbo (V), 9,752 votes.
