= Djurs (nomination district) =

- Djurs
- Nomination district constituency for the Folketing
- Location of Djurs within East Jutland

- Location of East Jutland within Denmark
- Municipalities: Norddjurs; Syddjurs
- Constituency: East Jutland
- Electorate: 61,581 (2022)

Current constituency
- Created: 2007

Djurs nominating district is one of the 92 nominating districts that was created for Danish elections following the 2007 municipal reform. It consists of Norddjurs and Syddjurs municipality.

In general elections, the district often votes close to the national result, when looking at the voting split between the two blocs.

== General elections results ==
=== General elections in the 2020s ===
2022 Danish general election

Parties	Vote		
Parties	Votes	%	+ / -
Social Democrats	15,927	31.39	+1.67
Venstre	6,396	12.60	-12.75
Denmark Democrats	5,861	11.55	New
Liberal Alliance	4,403	8.68	+5.94
Moderates	3,650	7.19	New
Green Left	3,427	6.75	-0.50
New Right	2,671	5.26	+2.96
Red–Green Alliance	2,079	4.10	-1.38
Conservatives	1,893	3.73	-0.77
The Alternative	1,666	3.28	+0.71
Danish People's Party	1,312	2.59	-7.82
Social Liberals	1,115	2.20	-3.05
Christian Democrats	176	0.35	-1.31
Independent Greens	105	0.21	New
Jesper Antonsen	51	0.10	New
Chresten H. Ibsen	12	0.02	-0.06
Total	50,744		

=== General elections in the 2010s ===
2019 Danish general election

Parties	Vote		
Parties	Votes	%	+ / -
Social Democrats	14,886	29.72	+2.49
Venstre	12,700	25.35	+4.51
Danish People's Party	5,213	10.41	-14.50
Green Left	3,630	7.25	+2.33
Red–Green Alliance	2,744	5.48	-0.35
Social Liberals	2,630	5.25	+2.79
Conservatives	2,252	4.50	+2.20
Liberal Alliance	1,370	2.74	-3.20
The Alternative	1,288	2.57	-2.43
New Right	1,154	2.30	New
Stram Kurs	904	1.80	New
Christian Democrats	831	1.66	+1.19
Klaus Riskær Pedersen Party	442	0.88	New
Chresten H. Ibsen	41	0.08	New
Hans Schultz	4	0.01	New
Total	50,089		

2015 Danish general election

Parties	Vote		
Parties	Votes	%	+ / -
Social Democrats	13,935	27.23	-1.76
Danish People's Party	12,749	24.91	+11.78
Venstre	10,666	20.84	-9.18
Liberal Alliance	3,039	5.94	+2.00
Red–Green Alliance	2,986	5.83	+0.91
The Alternative	2,558	5.00	New
Green Left	2,519	4.92	-2.89
Social Liberals	1,258	2.46	-4.99
Conservatives	1,178	2.30	-0.93
Christian Democrats	239	0.47	-0.01
Yahya Hassan	35	0.07	New
Peter Ymer Nielsen	8	0.02	New
Poul Gundersen	4	0.01	New
Total	51,174		

2011 Danish general election

Parties	Vote		
Parties	Votes	%	+ / -
Venstre	15,494	30.02	-0.79
Social Democrats	14,963	28.99	+1.69
Danish People's Party	6,775	13.13	-2.17
Green Left	4,031	7.81	-3.12
Social Liberals	3,847	7.45	+3.76
Red–Green Alliance	2,540	4.92	+3.63
Liberal Alliance	2,036	3.94	+1.81
Conservatives	1,667	3.23	-4.75
Christian Democrats	250	0.48	-0.07
Janus Kramer Møller	12	0.02	New
Ibrahim Gøkhan	4	0.01	New
Total	51,619		

=== General elections in the 2000s ===
2007 Danish general election

Parties	Vote		
Parties	Votes	%	+ / -
Venstre	15,541	30.81	
Social Democrats	13,770	27.30	
Danish People's Party	7,717	15.30	
Green Left	5,514	10.93	
Conservatives	4,025	7.98	
Social Liberals	1,863	3.69	
New Alliance	1,074	2.13	
Red–Green Alliance	650	1.29	
Christian Democrats	278	0.55	
Jes Krogh	12	0.02	
Total	50,444		

== European Parliament elections results ==
2024 European Parliament election in Denmark

Parties	Vote		
Parties	Votes	%	+ / -
Social Democrats	5,742	17.20	-4.74
Green Left	5,488	16.44	+0.08
Venstre	5,060	15.16	-9.01
Denmark Democrats	3,823	11.45	New
Danish People's Party	2,547	7.63	-5.1
Conservatives	2,382	7.14	+2.46
Moderates	2,099	6.29	New
Liberal Alliance	2,035	6.10	+4.25
Red–Green Alliance	1,784	5.34	+0.81
Social Liberals	1,571	4.71	-2.15
The Alternative	849	2.54	-0.27
Total	33,380		

2019 European Parliament election in Denmark

Parties	Vote		
Parties	Votes	%	+ / -
Venstre	9,086	24.17	+5.86
Social Democrats	8,247	21.94	+3.86
Green Left	6,150	16.36	+6.36
Danish People's Party	4,785	12.73	-19.01
Social Liberals	2,577	6.86	+2.43
Conservatives	1,759	4.68	-2.14
Red–Green Alliance	1,704	4.53	New
People's Movement against the EU	1,532	4.08	-3.94
The Alternative	1,055	2.81	New
Liberal Alliance	697	1.85	-0.75
Total	37,592		

2014 European Parliament election in Denmark

Parties	Vote		
Parties	Votes	%	+ / -
Danish People's Party	9,769	31.74	+13.20
Venstre	5,635	18.31	-5.59
Social Democrats	5,565	18.08	-5.15
Green Left	3,076	10.00	-3.31
People's Movement against the EU	2,469	8.02	+2.24
Conservatives	2,100	6.82	-3.45
Social Liberals	1,362	4.43	+1.92
Liberal Alliance	799	2.60	+2.23
Total	30,775		

2009 European Parliament election in Denmark

Parties	Vote		
Parties	Votes	%	+ / -
Venstre	7,921	23.90	
Social Democrats	7,701	23.23	
Danish People's Party	6,147	18.54	
Green Left	4,412	13.31	
Conservatives	3,406	10.27	
People's Movement against the EU	1,916	5.78	
Social Liberals	832	2.51	
June Movement	693	2.09	
Liberal Alliance	121	0.37	
Total	33,149		

== Referendums ==
2022 Danish European Union opt-out referendum

Option	Votes	%
✓ YES	26,056	65.12
X NO	13,958	34.88

2015 Danish European Union opt-out referendum

Option	Votes	%
X NO	24,222	57.15
✓ YES	18,159	42.85

2014 Danish Unified Patent Court membership referendum

Option	Votes	%
✓ YES	18,479	60.71
X NO	11,959	39.29

2009 Danish Act of Succession referendum

Option	Votes	%
✓ YES	26,909	86.39
X NO	4,238	13.61
