= Favrskov (nomination district) =

- Favrskov
- Nomination district constituency for the Folketing
- Location of Favrskov within East Jutland

- Location of East Jutland within Denmark
- Municipalities: Favrskov
- Constituency: East Jutland
- Electorate: 34,887 (2022)

Current constituency
- Created: 2007

Favrskov nominating district is one of the 92 nominating districts that was created for Danish elections following the 2007 municipal reform. It consists of Favrskov Municipality.

In general elections, parties commonly associated with the blue bloc has always won the most votes.

== General elections results ==
=== General elections in the 2020s ===
2022 Danish general election

Parties	Vote		
Parties	Votes	%	+ / -
Social Democrats	8,650	28.56	+0.44
Venstre	4,555	15.04	-12.41
Denmark Democrats	2,975	9.82	New
Moderates	2,542	8.39	New
Liberal Alliance	2,461	8.13	+5.97
Green Left	2,227	7.35	+1.15
Conservatives	1,889	6.24	-0.75
New Right	1,475	4.87	+2.80
Social Liberals	1,046	3.45	-3.58
Red–Green Alliance	929	3.07	-1.29
Danish People's Party	695	2.29	-6.91
The Alternative	624	2.06	-0.05
Christian Democrats	125	0.41	-1.49
Independent Greens	63	0.21	New
Jesper Antonsen	25	0.08	New
Chresten H. Ibsen	3	0.01	-0.09
Total	30,284		

=== General elections in the 2010s ===
2019 Danish general election

Parties	Vote		
Parties	Votes	%	+ / -
Social Democrats	8,400	28.12	+0.71
Venstre	8,199	27.45	+4.78
Danish People's Party	2,748	9.20	-13.22
Social Liberals	2,100	7.03	+2.78
Conservatives	2,087	6.99	+3.80
Green Left	1,852	6.20	+2.52
Red–Green Alliance	1,302	4.36	-0.59
Liberal Alliance	645	2.16	-4.62
The Alternative	630	2.11	-1.71
New Right	619	2.07	New
Christian Democrats	569	1.90	+1.17
Stram Kurs	493	1.65	New
Klaus Riskær Pedersen Party	193	0.65	New
Chresten H. Ibsen	31	0.10	New
Hans Schultz	4	0.01	New
Total	29,872		

2015 Danish general election

Parties	Vote		
Parties	Votes	%	+ / -
Social Democrats	8,185	27.41	+0.79
Venstre	6,770	22.67	-10.10
Danish People's Party	6,696	22.42	+10.69
Liberal Alliance	2,026	6.78	+2.44
Red–Green Alliance	1,479	4.95	+1.14
Social Liberals	1,270	4.25	-4.36
The Alternative	1,140	3.82	New
Green Left	1,100	3.68	-3.55
Conservatives	953	3.19	-1.16
Christian Democrats	217	0.73	+0.19
Yahya Hassan	16	0.05	New
Peter Ymer Nielsen	8	0.03	New
Poul Gundersen	3	0.01	New
Total	29,863		

2011 Danish general election

Parties	Vote		
Parties	Votes	%	+ / -
Venstre	9,814	32.77	-0.27
Social Democrats	7,972	26.62	+0.82
Danish People's Party	3,512	11.73	-1.30
Social Liberals	2,578	8.61	+3.59
Green Left	2,166	7.23	-2.16
Conservatives	1,303	4.35	-4.90
Liberal Alliance	1,301	4.34	+1.54
Red–Green Alliance	1,140	3.81	+2.78
Christian Democrats	163	0.54	-0.09
Janus Kramer Møller	2	0.01	New
Ibrahim Gøkhan	1	0.00	New
Total	29,952		

=== General elections in the 2000s ===
2007 Danish general election

Parties	Vote		
Parties	Votes	%	+ / -
Venstre	9,406	33.04	
Social Democrats	7,343	25.80	
Danish People's Party	3,708	13.03	
Green Left	2,674	9.39	
Conservatives	2,634	9.25	
Social Liberals	1,428	5.02	
New Alliance	796	2.80	
Red–Green Alliance	294	1.03	
Christian Democrats	178	0.63	
Jes Krogh	5	0.02	
Total	28,466		

== European Parliament elections results ==
2024 European Parliament election in Denmark

Parties	Vote		
Parties	Votes	%	+ / -
Social Democrats	3,555	16.31	-8.10
Venstre	3,452	15.84	-10.52
Green Left	3,309	15.18	+4.29
Conservatives	2,186	10.03	+4.26
Denmark Democrats	2,168	9.95	New
Liberal Alliance	1,625	7.46	+5.32
Social Liberals	1,522	6.98	-2.37
Danish People's Party	1,418	6.51	-5.14
Moderates	1,303	5.98	New
Red–Green Alliance	811	3.72	-0.03
The Alternative	447	2.05	-0.55
Total	21,796		

2019 European Parliament election in Denmark

Parties	Vote		
Parties	Votes	%	+ / -
Venstre	6,276	26.36	+6.16
Social Democrats	5,812	24.41	+4.18
Danish People's Party	2,774	11.65	-16.23
Green Left	2,592	10.89	+1.70
Social Liberals	2,227	9.35	+3.55
Conservatives	1,373	5.77	-2.54
Red–Green Alliance	892	3.75	New
People's Movement against the EU	739	3.10	-2.74
The Alternative	618	2.60	New
Liberal Alliance	509	2.14	-0.40
Total	23,812		

2014 European Parliament election in Denmark

Parties	Vote		
Parties	Votes	%	+ / -
Danish People's Party	5,489	27.88	+11.88
Social Democrats	3,983	20.23	-2.72
Venstre	3,976	20.20	-4.63
Green Left	1,810	9.19	-4.36
Conservatives	1,636	8.31	-3.99
People's Movement against the EU	1,149	5.84	+1.18
Social Liberals	1,142	5.80	+2.67
Liberal Alliance	500	2.54	+2.02
Total	19,685		

2009 European Parliament election in Denmark

Parties	Vote		
Parties	Votes	%	+ / -
Venstre	5,139	24.83	
Social Democrats	4,750	22.95	
Danish People's Party	3,311	16.00	
Green Left	2,804	13.55	
Conservatives	2,546	12.30	
People's Movement against the EU	964	4.66	
Social Liberals	648	3.13	
June Movement	423	2.04	
Liberal Alliance	108	0.52	
Total	20,693		

== Referendums ==
2022 Danish European Union opt-out referendum

Option	Votes	%
✓ YES	17,104	69.44
X NO	7,527	30.56

2015 Danish European Union opt-out referendum

Option	Votes	%
X NO	13,149	51.66
✓ YES	12,306	48.34

2014 Danish Unified Patent Court membership referendum

Option	Votes	%
✓ YES	12,719	66.30
X NO	6,464	33.70

2009 Danish Act of Succession referendum

Option	Votes	%
✓ YES	17,212	87.41
X NO	2,478	12.59
