= Kirsten Normann Andersen =

Danish politician

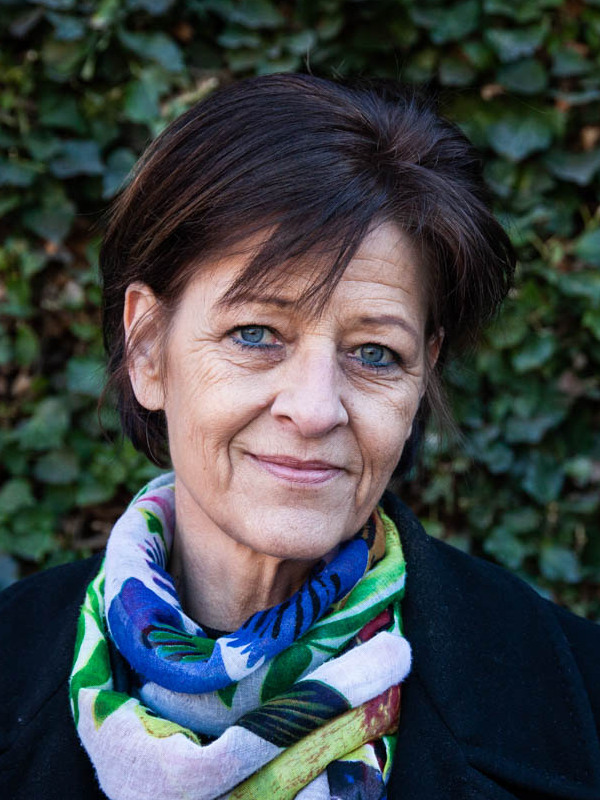
- Andersen in 2019

Member of the Folketing
- Incumbent
- Assumed office 8 August 2016
- Constituency: East Jutland

Personal details
- Born: 28 April 1962 (age 64) Aarhus, Denmark
- Party: Socialist People's Party

Kirsten Normann Andersen (born 28 April 1962) is a Danish politician, who is a member of the Folketing for the Socialist People's Party. She entered parliament in 2016, after Jonas Dahl resigned his seat.

== Political career ==
Andersen ran in the 2015 Danish general election where she received 2,149 personal votes. Although this did not secure her a seat in parliament, she became the Socialist People's Party's primary substitute in the Østjylland constituency. When Jonas Dahl resigned his seat on 8 August 2016, Andersen entered parliament in his place. She served the remaining of the 2015-2019 term. She was elected into the Folketing at the 2019 election, receiving 7,885 personal votes.
