= Kim Christiansen =

Kim Christiansen may refer to:

- Kim Christiansen (politician) (born 1956), Danish politician
- Kim Christiansen (snowboarder) (born 1976), Norwegian snowboarder
