= Randers South (nomination district) =

Constituency in East Jutland, Denmark

- Randers Syd
- Nomination district constituency for the Folketing
- Location of Randers South within East Jutland

- Location of East Jutland within Denmark
- Municipalities: Randers
- Constituency: East Jutland
- Electorate: 38,675 (2022)

Current constituency
- Created: 2007

Randers South nominating district is one of the 92 nominating districts that was created for Danish elections following the 2007 municipal reform. It is one of the two nomination districts in Randers Municipality, the other being Randers North.

In general elections, the district tends to vote close to the national result, when looking at the voter split between the two blocs.

== General elections results ==
=== General elections in the 2020s ===
2022 Danish general election

Parties	Vote		
Parties	Votes	%	+ / -
Social Democrats	10,224	32.58	+1.99
Venstre	4,757	15.16	-11.54
Liberal Alliance	2,972	9.47	+7.19
Denmark Democrats	2,881	9.18	New
Moderates	2,189	6.98	New
Green Left	2,126	6.77	+0.04
New Right	1,500	4.78	+2.57
Conservatives	1,252	3.99	-0.60
Red–Green Alliance	1,060	3.38	-1.66
Danish People's Party	850	2.71	-6.68
Social Liberals	682	2.17	-2.99
The Alternative	601	1.92	-0.23
Christian Democrats	207	0.66	-1.90
Independent Greens	53	0.17	New
Jesper Antonsen	28	0.09	New
Chresten H. Ibsen	1	0.00	-0.07
Total	31,383		

=== General elections in the 2010s ===
2019 Danish general election

Parties	Vote		
Parties	Votes	%	+ / -
Social Democrats	9,499	30.59	+0.83
Venstre	8,290	26.70	+6.20
Danish People's Party	2,917	9.39	-13.80
Green Left	2,089	6.73	+3.70
Social Liberals	1,603	5.16	+2.41
Red–Green Alliance	1,564	5.04	-1.34
Conservatives	1,424	4.59	+1.97
Christian Democrats	795	2.56	+1.35
Liberal Alliance	709	2.28	-4.69
New Right	686	2.21	New
The Alternative	667	2.15	-1.25
Stram Kurs	555	1.79	New
Klaus Riskær Pedersen Party	229	0.74	New
Chresten H. Ibsen	23	0.07	New
Hans Schultz	3	0.01	New
Total	31,053		

2015 Danish general election

Parties	Vote		
Parties	Votes	%	+ / -
Social Democrats	9,287	29.76	-2.24
Danish People's Party	7,237	23.19	+11.35
Venstre	6,397	20.50	-9.14
Liberal Alliance	2,176	6.97	+2.86
Red–Green Alliance	1,991	6.38	+1.94
The Alternative	1,060	3.40	New
Green Left	945	3.03	-4.12
Social Liberals	857	2.75	-4.11
Conservatives	818	2.62	-0.52
Christian Democrats	378	1.21	+0.42
Yahya Hassan	55	0.18	New
Peter Ymer Nielsen	4	0.01	New
Poul Gundersen	3	0.01	New
Total	31,208		

2011 Danish general election

Parties	Vote		
Parties	Votes	%	+ / -
Social Democrats	10,081	32.00	+1.28
Venstre	9,337	29.64	-0.18
Danish People's Party	3,730	11.84	-2.65
Green Left	2,254	7.15	-2.48
Social Liberals	2,160	6.86	+3.58
Red–Green Alliance	1,400	4.44	+3.48
Liberal Alliance	1,294	4.11	+2.15
Conservatives	989	3.14	-4.92
Christian Democrats	250	0.79	-0.27
Janus Kramer Møller	8	0.03	New
Ibrahim Gøkhan	3	0.01	New
Total	31,506		

=== General elections in the 2000s ===
2007 Danish general election

Parties	Vote		
Parties	Votes	%	+ / -
Social Democrats	9,307	30.72	
Venstre	9,035	29.82	
Danish People's Party	4,389	14.49	
Green Left	2,918	9.63	
Conservatives	2,441	8.06	
Social Liberals	993	3.28	
New Alliance	593	1.96	
Christian Democrats	322	1.06	
Red–Green Alliance	290	0.96	
Jes Krogh	8	0.03	
Total	30,296		

== European Parliament elections results ==
2024 European Parliament election in Denmark

Parties	Vote		
Parties	Votes	%	+ / -
Social Democrats	3,753	18.59	-8.02
Venstre	2,926	14.50	-9.83
Green Left	2,881	14.27	+3.56
Denmark Democrats	2,092	10.36	New
Danish People's Party	1,690	8.37	-4.22
Conservatives	1,675	8.30	+3.00
Liberal Alliance	1,609	7.97	+5.46
Moderates	1,182	5.86	New
Red–Green Alliance	962	4.77	+0.20
Social Liberals	945	4.68	-2.23
The Alternative	470	2.33	-0.25
Total	20,185		

2019 European Parliament election in Denmark

Parties	Vote		
Parties	Votes	%	+ / -
Social Democrats	6,081	26.61	+6.32
Venstre	5,560	24.33	+7.05
Danish People's Party	2,877	12.59	-20.48
Green Left	2,448	10.71	+2.73
Social Liberals	1,580	6.91	+2.83
Conservatives	1,212	5.30	-1.85
Red–Green Alliance	1,045	4.57	New
People's Movement against the EU	885	3.87	-3.41
The Alternative	590	2.58	New
Liberal Alliance	574	2.51	-0.37
Total	22,852		

2014 European Parliament election in Denmark

Parties	Vote		
Parties	Votes	%	+ / -
Danish People's Party	6,186	33.07	+13.52
Social Democrats	3,794	20.29	-5.80
Venstre	3,231	17.28	-3.47
Green Left	1,492	7.98	-3.73
People's Movement against the EU	1,361	7.28	+1.78
Conservatives	1,338	7.15	-4.25
Social Liberals	763	4.08	+1.47
Liberal Alliance	538	2.88	+2.29
Total	18,703		

2009 European Parliament election in Denmark

Parties	Vote		
Parties	Votes	%	+ / -
Social Democrats	5,218	26.09	
Venstre	4,150	20.75	
Danish People's Party	3,910	19.55	
Green Left	2,343	11.71	
Conservatives	2,280	11.40	
People's Movement against the EU	1,100	5.50	
Social Liberals	522	2.61	
June Movement	360	1.80	
Liberal Alliance	119	0.59	
Total	20,002		

== Referendums ==
2022 Danish European Union opt-out referendum

Option	Votes	%
✓ YES	15,418	64.21
X NO	8,592	35.79

2015 Danish European Union opt-out referendum

Option	Votes	%
X NO	14,740	57.52
✓ YES	10,884	42.48

2014 Danish Unified Patent Court membership referendum

Option	Votes	%
✓ YES	11,116	60.81
X NO	7,165	39.19

2009 Danish Act of Succession referendum

Option	Votes	%
✓ YES	16,139	85.16
X NO	2,813	14.84
