= Daniel Toft Jakobsen =

Danish politician

Member of the Folketing
- Incumbent
- Assumed office 18 June 2015
- Constituency: East Jutland

Personal details
- Born: 12 May 1978 (age 48) Kongens Lyngby, Denmark
- Party: Social Democrats

Daniel Toft Jakobsen (born 12 May 1978) is a Danish politician who is a member of the Folketing for the Social Democrats political party. He was elected into parliament at the 2015 Danish general election.

== Political career ==
Jakobsen first ran for parliament in the 2011 election, where he received 2,424 votes. While not enough for a seat in parliament, this made him the Social Democrats' secondary substitute in the East Jutland constituency. He acted as substitute for Kirsten Brosbøl from 23 October 2012 to 1 December 2013. He sat in the municipal council of Hedensted Municipality from 2014 to 2015. He ran again in the 2015 election, where he was elected into parliament with 4,344 votes. He was reelected in 2019 with 4,615 votes.
