= Hedensted (nomination district) =

- Hedensted
- Nomination district constituency for the Folketing
- Location of Hedensted within East Jutland

- Location of East Jutland within Denmark
- Municipalities: Hedensted
- Constituency: East Jutland
- Electorate: 34,543 (2022)

Current constituency
- Created: 2007

Hedensted nominating district is one of the 92 nominating districts that was created for Danish elections following the 2007 municipal reform. It consists of Hedensted Municipality.

In general elections, the district is a very strong area for parties commonly associated with the blue bloc.

== General elections results ==
=== General elections in the 2020s ===
2022 Danish general election

Parties	Vote		
Parties	Votes	%	+ / -
Social Democrats	7,448	25.43	+1.58
Venstre	5,411	18.48	-12.64
Denmark Democrats	4,066	13.88	New
Liberal Alliance	2,810	9.60	+7.17
Moderates	2,633	8.99	New
New Right	1,714	5.85	+3.45
Conservatives	1,264	4.32	-1.09
Green Left	1,210	4.13	-0.21
Danish People's Party	785	2.68	-11.55
Red–Green Alliance	532	1.82	-1.30
Christian Democrats	510	1.74	-3.05
Social Liberals	490	1.67	-2.49
The Alternative	341	1.16	-0.13
Independent Greens	45	0.15	New
Jesper Antonsen	24	0.08	New
Chresten H. Ibsen	2	0.01	-0.05
Total	29,285		

=== General elections in the 2010s ===
2019 Danish general election

Parties	Vote		
Parties	Votes	%	+ / -
Venstre	9,024	31.12	+6.91
Social Democrats	6,917	23.85	+2.15
Danish People's Party	4,127	14.23	-16.03
Conservatives	1,569	5.41	+3.19
Christian Democrats	1,390	4.79	+2.44
Green Left	1,258	4.34	+1.89
Social Liberals	1,205	4.16	+1.65
Red–Green Alliance	905	3.12	-0.63
Liberal Alliance	706	2.43	-5.75
New Right	695	2.40	New
Stram Kurs	575	1.98	New
The Alternative	373	1.29	-0.96
Klaus Riskær Pedersen Party	235	0.81	New
Chresten H. Ibsen	18	0.06	New
Hans Schultz	2	0.01	New
Total	28,999		

2015 Danish general election

Parties	Vote		
Parties	Votes	%	+ / -
Danish People's Party	8,922	30.26	+14.58
Venstre	7,138	24.21	-13.21
Social Democrats	6,399	21.70	+0.56
Liberal Alliance	2,413	8.18	+2.74
Red–Green Alliance	1,106	3.75	+0.83
Social Liberals	741	2.51	-3.69
Green Left	721	2.45	-3.79
Christian Democrats	694	2.35	+0.74
The Alternative	664	2.25	New
Conservatives	655	2.22	-1.11
Yahya Hassan	26	0.09	New
Poul Gundersen	2	0.01	New
Peter Ymer Nielsen	2	0.01	New
Total	29,483		

2011 Danish general election

Parties	Vote		
Parties	Votes	%	+ / -
Venstre	11,063	37.42	-2.14
Social Democrats	6,250	21.14	+1.14
Danish People's Party	4,636	15.68	-0.85
Green Left	1,844	6.24	-1.96
Social Liberals	1,833	6.20	+3.18
Liberal Alliance	1,609	5.44	+3.28
Conservatives	985	3.33	-4.70
Red–Green Alliance	863	2.92	+2.27
Christian Democrats	476	1.61	-0.24
Janus Kramer Møller	8	0.03	New
Ibrahim Gøkhan	1	0.00	New
Total	29,568		

=== General elections in the 2000s ===
2007 Danish general election

Parties	Vote		
Parties	Votes	%	+ / -
Venstre	11,382	39.56	
Social Democrats	5,756	20.00	
Danish People's Party	4,757	16.53	
Green Left	2,360	8.20	
Conservatives	2,311	8.03	
Social Liberals	868	3.02	
New Alliance	621	2.16	
Christian Democrats	531	1.85	
Red–Green Alliance	186	0.65	
Jes Krogh	3	0.01	
Total	28,775		

== European Parliament elections results ==
2024 European Parliament election in Denmark

Parties	Vote		
Parties	Votes	%	+ / -
Venstre	4,227	21.61	-10.68
Social Democrats	2,762	14.12	-6.42
Denmark Democrats	2,506	12.81	New
Conservatives	2,130	10.89	+5.02
Green Left	1,963	10.04	+2.59
Danish People's Party	1,680	8.59	-8.69
Liberal Alliance	1,559	7.97	+4.94
Moderates	1,245	6.37	New
Social Liberals	779	3.98	-2.03
Red–Green Alliance	449	2.30	-0.65
The Alternative	259	1.32	-0.19
Total	19,559		

2019 European Parliament election in Denmark

Parties	Vote		
Parties	Votes	%	+ / -
Venstre	7,221	32.29	+7.36
Social Democrats	4,593	20.54	+5.38
Danish People's Party	3,865	17.28	-16.71
Green Left	1,667	7.45	+1.55
Social Liberals	1,343	6.01	+2.55
Conservatives	1,312	5.87	-3.27
People's Movement against the EU	688	3.08	-1.54
Liberal Alliance	677	3.03	+0.23
Red–Green Alliance	660	2.95	New
The Alternative	337	1.51	New
Total	22,363		

2014 European Parliament election in Denmark

Parties	Vote		
Parties	Votes	%	+ / -
Danish People's Party	6,505	33.99	+14.29
Venstre	4,772	24.93	-3.78
Social Democrats	2,901	15.16	-1.64
Conservatives	1,749	9.14	-5.92
Green Left	1,130	5.90	-4.62
People's Movement against the EU	884	4.62	+0.19
Social Liberals	663	3.46	+1.05
Liberal Alliance	535	2.80	+2.31
Total	19,139		

2009 European Parliament election in Denmark

Parties	Vote		
Parties	Votes	%	+ / -
Venstre	5,711	28.71	
Danish People's Party	3,918	19.70	
Social Democrats	3,342	16.80	
Conservatives	2,995	15.06	
Green Left	2,092	10.52	
People's Movement against the EU	882	4.43	
Social Liberals	480	2.41	
June Movement	373	1.88	
Liberal Alliance	98	0.49	
Total	19,891		

== Referendums ==
2022 Danish European Union opt-out referendum

Option	Votes	%
✓ YES	14,958	64.05
X NO	8,395	35.95

2015 Danish European Union opt-out referendum

Option	Votes	%
X NO	14,203	56.58
✓ YES	10,900	43.42

2014 Danish Unified Patent Court membership referendum

Option	Votes	%
✓ YES	11,884	63.38
X NO	6,865	36.62

2009 Danish Act of Succession referendum

Option	Votes	%
✓ YES	16,896	87.39
X NO	2,439	12.61
