= Charlotte Broman Mølbæk =

Danish politician

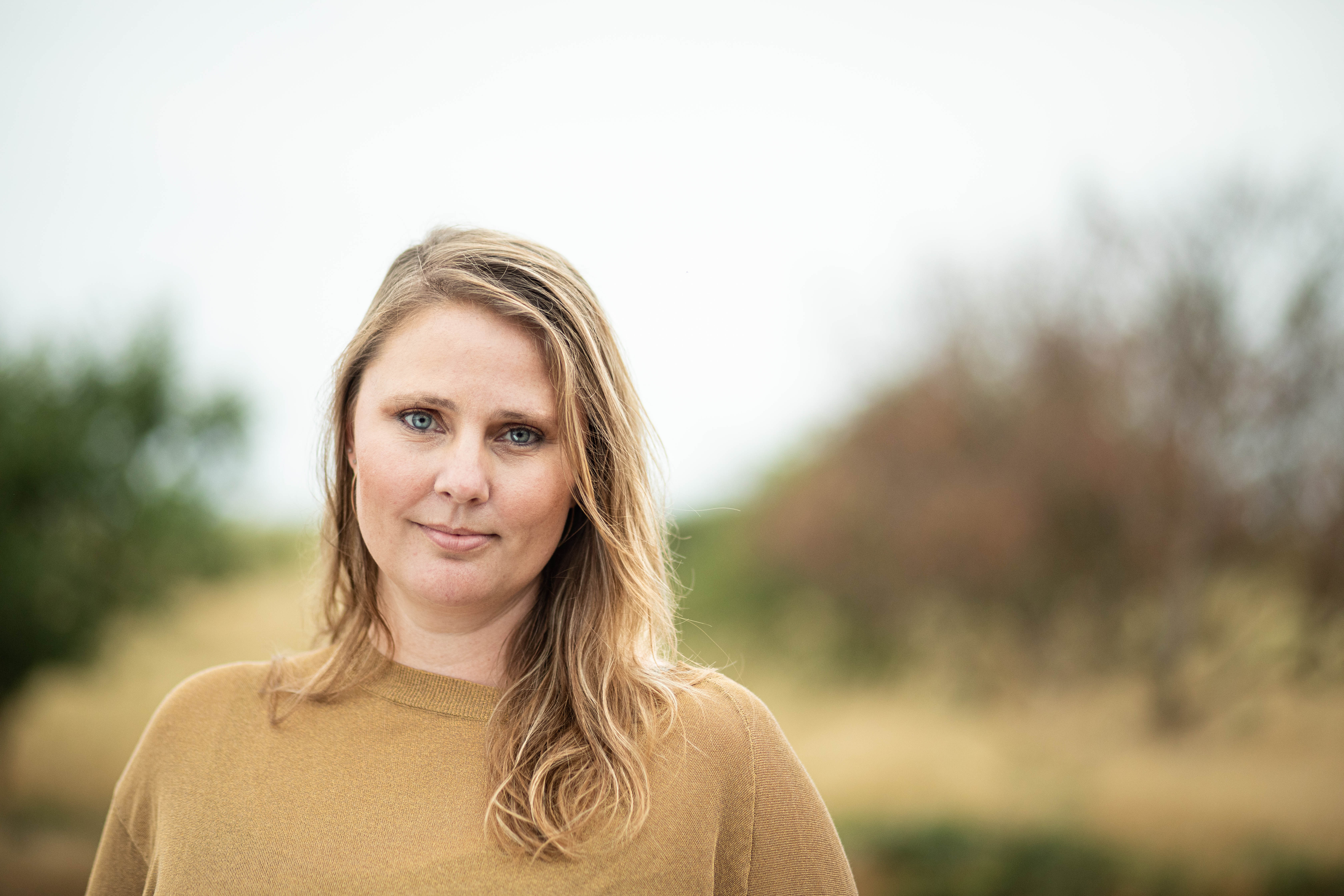
- Charlotte Broman Mølbæk, 2020

Member of the Folketing
- Incumbent
- Assumed office 5 June 2019
- Constituency: East Jutland

Personal details
- Born: 29 November 1977 (age 48) Aarhus, Denmark
- Party: Socialist People's Party

Charlotte Broman Mølbæk (born 29 November 1977) is a Danish politician who is a member of the Folketing for the Socialist People's Party. She was elected into parliament at the 2019 Danish general election.

== Political career ==
Mølbæk was a member of the municipal council of Randers Municipality from 2014 to 2019. She was elected into parliament at the 2019 election, where she received 2,641 personal votes.
