= Hans Kristian Skibby =

Danish politician

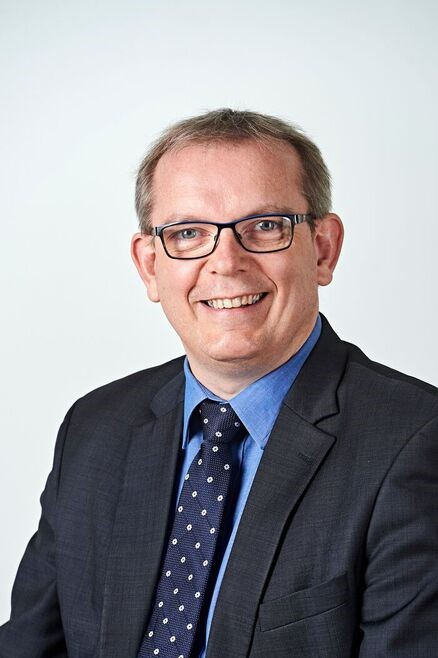

Member of the Folketing
- Incumbent
- Assumed office 8 February 2005
- Constituency: East Jutland (2007-); Vejle (2005-2007)

Personal details
- Born: 18 January 1969 (age 57) Brædstrup, Denmark
- Party: Danish People's Party (until 2022)
- Spouse: Linda Skibby Olesen
- Children: 3

Hans Kristian Skibby (born 18 January 1969) is a Danish politician, who is a member of the Folketing for the Danish People's Party. He was elected into parliament at the 2005 Danish general election.

== Political career ==
Skibby was in the municipal council of Tørring-Uldum Municipality from 1998 to 2006. He has been in the municipal council of Hedensted Municipality since 2006.

Skibby first ran for parliament in the 2001 election in the Vejle Constituency. He was not elected into parliament, though he became a substitute member for the constituency. He acted as a substitute member of the Folketing from 16 April 2002 to 31 May 2002. He ran again in the 2005 election and was elected into parliament. When the constituencies were changed in 2007, Skibby ran in the new Østjylland Constituency in the 2007 election. He was reelected in this election, and again in 2011 with 2,947 votes. He was reelected again in 2015 with 4,992 votes and in 2019 with 2,834 votes.
