= Louise Brown (politician) =

Danish politician (born 1980)

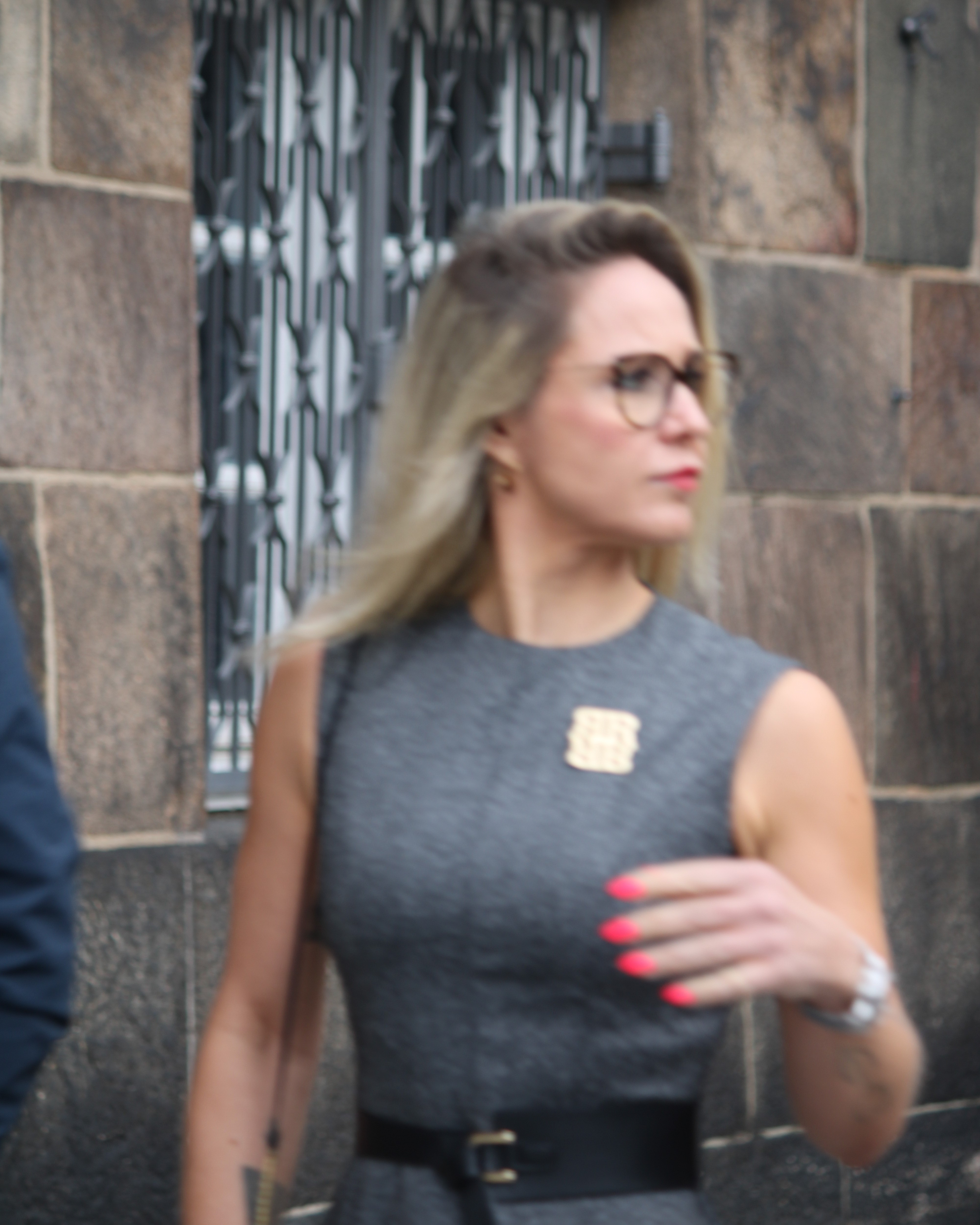
- Brown in 2025

Member of the Folketing
- Incumbent
- Assumed office 2022
- Constituency: East Jutland

Personal details
- Born: 15 October 1980 (age 45) Denmark
- Party: Liberal Alliance
- Education: Aalborg University

Louise Brown (born 15 October 1980) is a Danish politician. She was elected a member of parliament for the Liberal Alliance in the 2022 Danish general election.

== See also ==
- List of members of the Folketing, 2022–present
