= Camilla Fabricius =

Danish politician (born 1971)

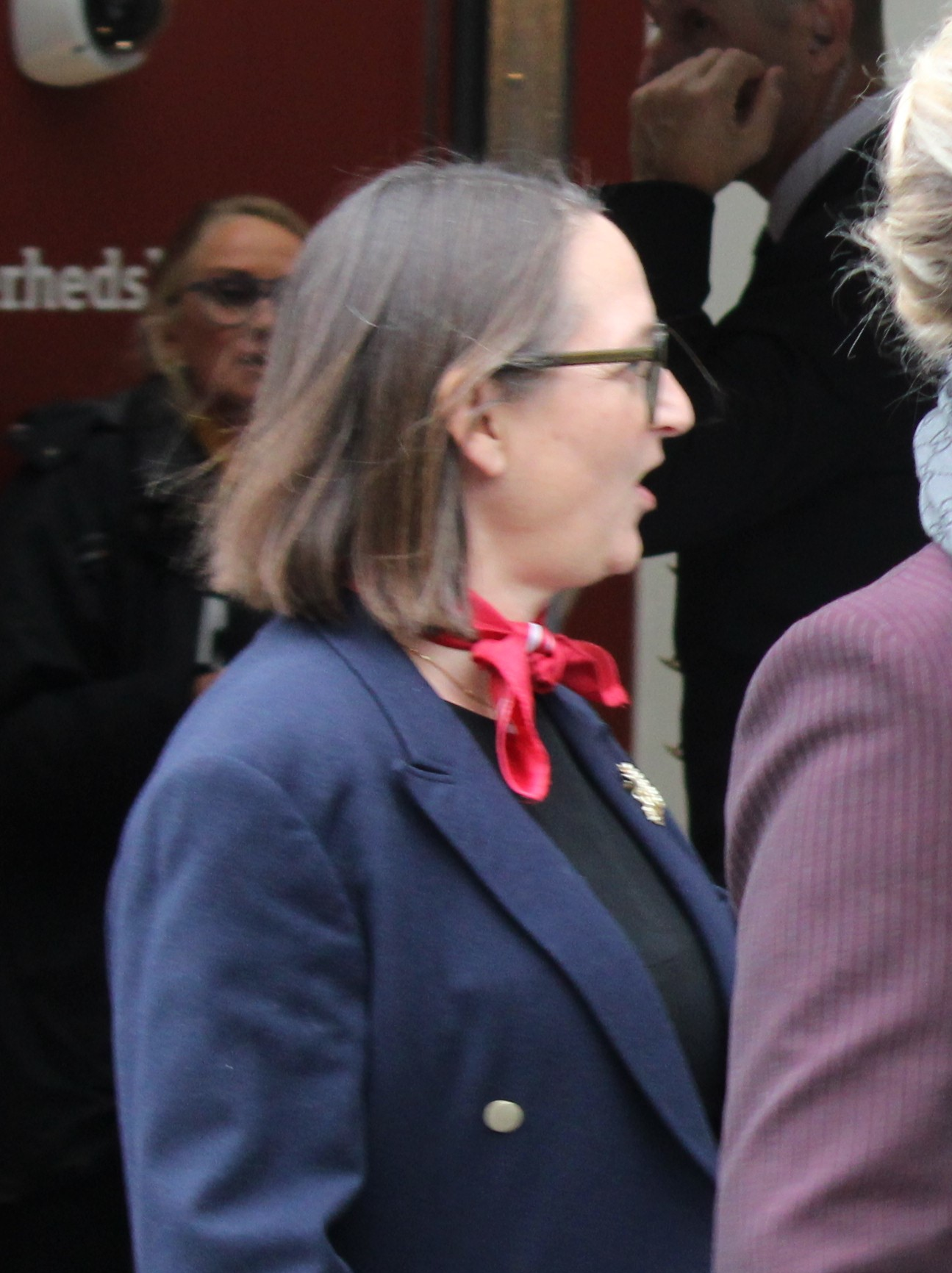
- Fabricius in 2025

Member of the Folketing
- Incumbent
- Assumed office 5 June 2019
- Constituency: East Jutland

Personal details
- Born: 20 October 1971 (age 54) Aarhus, Denmark
- Party: Social Democrats

Camilla Fabricius (born 20 October 1971) is a Danish politician, who is a member of the Folketing for the Social Democrats political party. She was elected into parliament at the 2019 Danish general election.

== Political career ==
Fabricius was in the municipal council of Aarhus from 2008 to 2019. She was first elected into parliament in the 2019 election, where she received 6,506 votes.
