= Louise Louring =

Danish politician (born 1992)

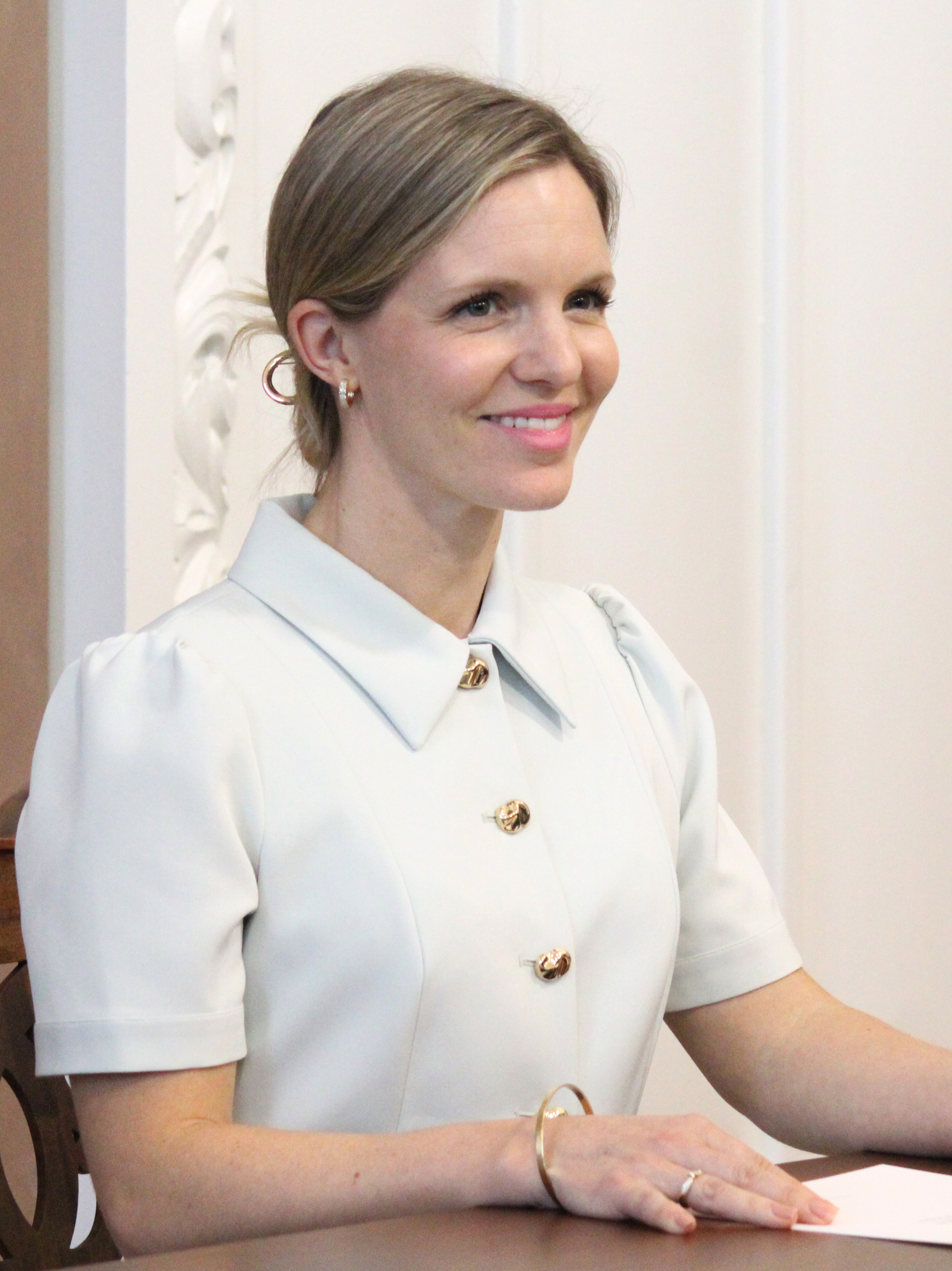
- Louring in 2026

Member of the Folketing
- Incumbent
- Assumed office 24 March 2026
- Constituency: East Jutland

Personal details
- Born: 23 May 1992 (age 34)
- Party: Venstre

Louise Lingren Louring (born 23 May 1992) is a Danish politician serving as a member of the Folketing since 2026. She has served as second deputy mayor of Odder since 2026.
