= Peter Have =

Danish politician (born 1963)

Member of the Folketing
- Incumbent
- Assumed office 1 November 2022
- Constituency: East Jutland

Personal details
- Born: 25 September 1963 (age 62) Copenhagen, Denmark
- Party: Moderates
- Occupation: Politician

Peter Have (born 25 September 1963) is a Danish politician and Member of the Folketing for East Jutland from the Moderates. Alongside sixteen other members of The Moderates, Have was elected to the Folketing in November 2022. He serves as the party's spokesperson on defence and transport.

== See also ==
- List of members of the Folketing, 2022–present
