= Mette Dencker =

Danish politician (born 1978)

Member of the Folketing
- Incumbent
- Assumed office 15 September 2011
- Constituency: East Jutland

Personal details
- Born: 24 May 1978 (age 47) Odder, Denmark
- Party: Danish People's Party

Mette Hjermind Dencker (born 24 May 1978 in Odder) is a Danish politician, who is a member of the Folketing for the Danish People's Party. She was elected into parliament at the 2011 Danish general election.

== Political career ==
Dencker has been in the municipal council of Hvidovre Municipality since 2006.

She was first elected into the Folketing in the 2011 general election, where she received 2,344 personal votes. She was reelected in the 2015 election with 6,218 personal votes, and again in the 2019 election with 2,348 personal votes.
