= Heidi Bank =

Danish politician

Member of the Folketing
- Incumbent
- Assumed office 5 June 2019
- Constituency: East Jutland

Personal details
- Born: 1 August 1972 (age 53) Hørsholm, Denmark
- Party: Venstre

Heidi Farsøe Bank (born 1 August 1972) is a Danish politician, who is a member of the Folketing for the Venstre political party. She was elected into the Folketing in the 2019 Danish general election. She has a background as a real estate agent.

== Political career ==
Bank first ran for a political office in the 2017 Danish local elections, where she was a candidate for Venstre in Aarhus Municipality. She was elected member of the municipal council with 2,109 votes cast for her.

Bank was elected into parliament at the 2019 election, where she received 2,943 personal votes, securing a seat in the Folketing as a levelling seat.
