= Katrine Robsøe =

Danish politician (born 1991)

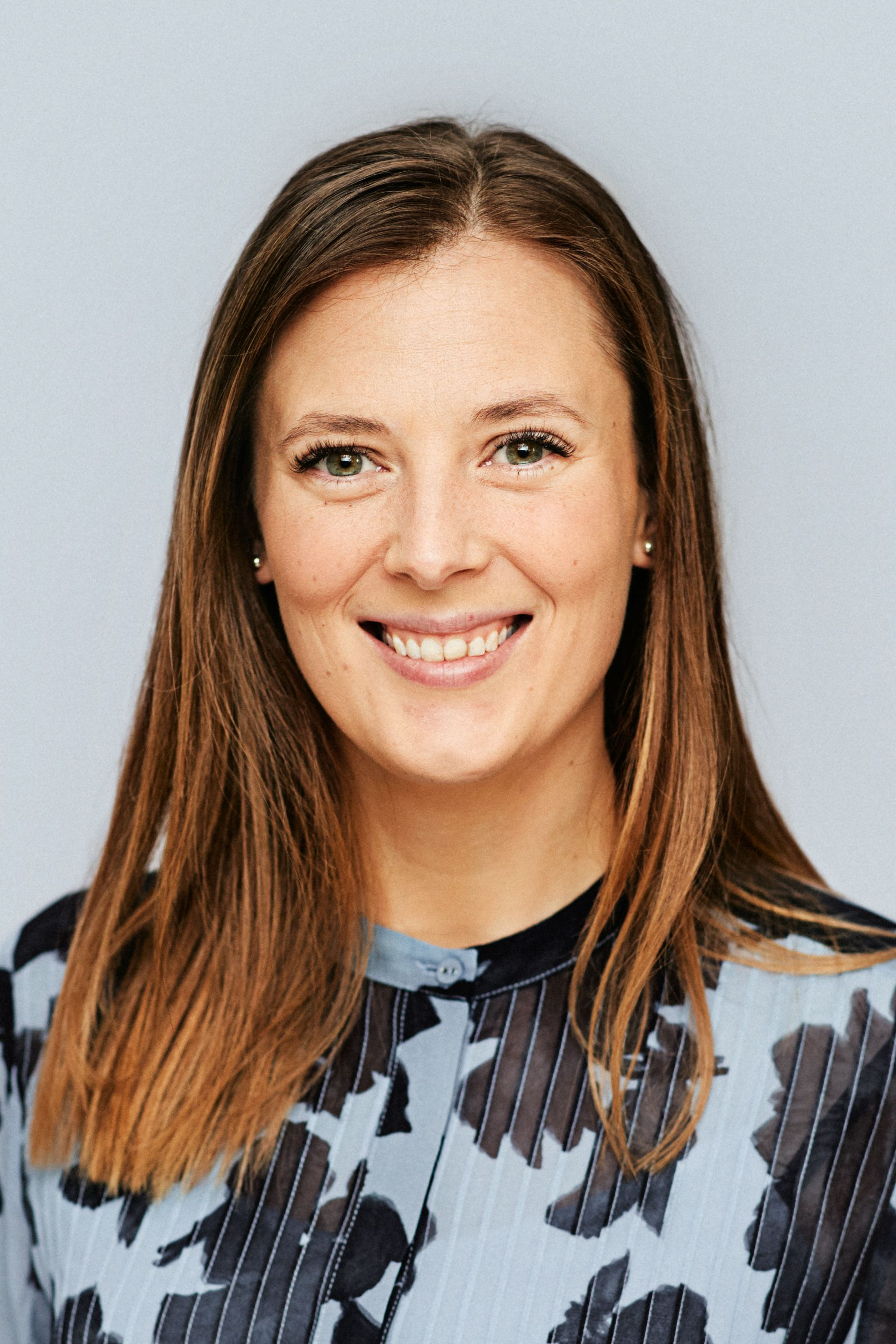

Member of the Folketing
- Incumbent
- Assumed office 5 June 2019
- Constituency: East Jutland

Personal details
- Born: 21 June 1991 (age 34) Aarhus, Denmark
- Party: Social Liberal Party

Katrine Kjær Robsøe (born 21 June 1991) is a Danish politician who is a member of the Folketing for the Social Liberal Party. She was elected into parliament at the 2019 Danish general election.

== Political career ==
Robsøe was elected into parliament at the 2019 election, where she received 3,430 personal votes.
