= Jens Meilvang =

Danish politician (born 1981)

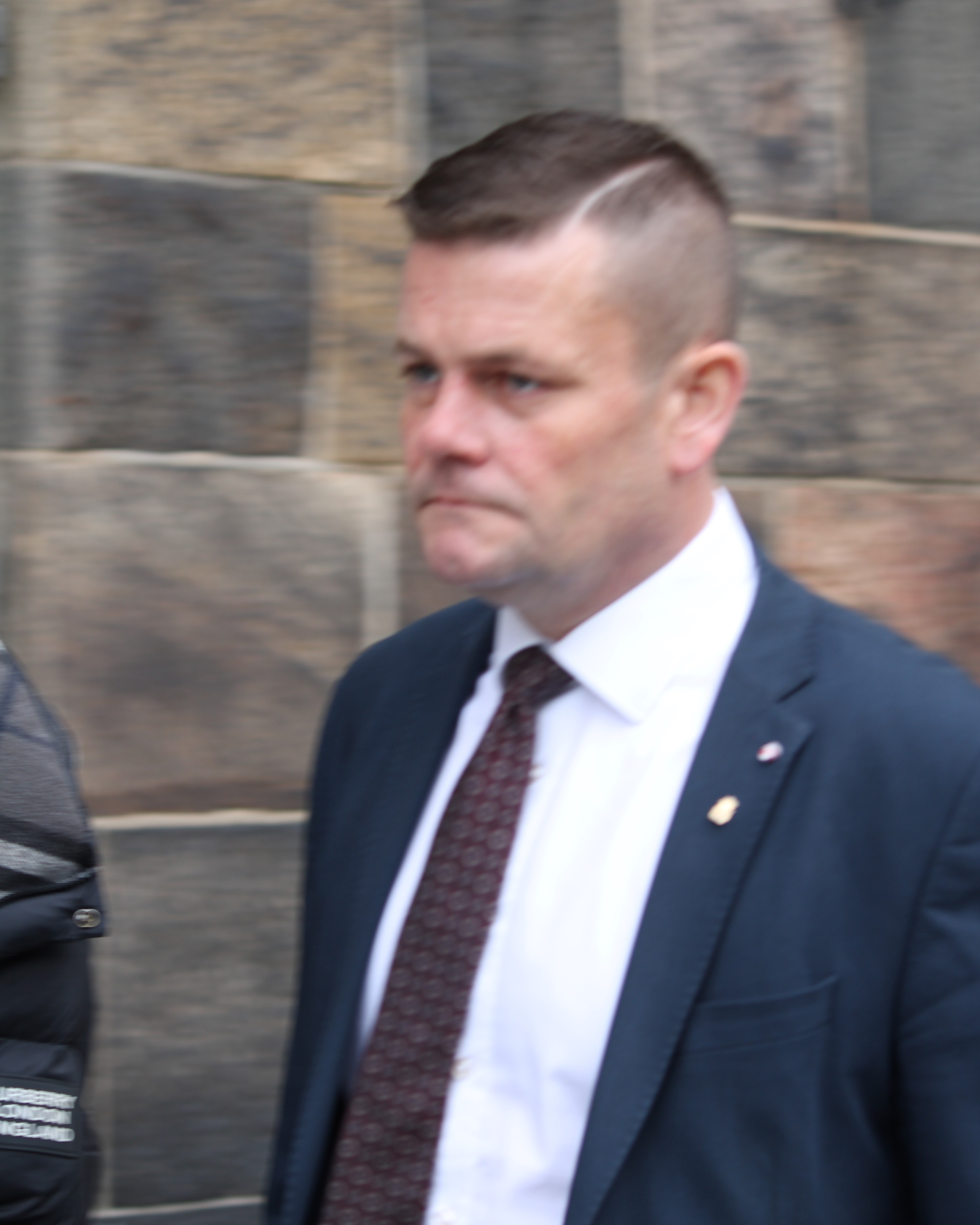
- Meilvang in 2026

Member of the Folketing
- Incumbent
- Assumed office 1 November 2022
- Constituency: East Jutland

Personal details
- Born: 2 April 1981 (age 45) Auning, Denmark
- Party: Liberal Alliance

Jens Meilvang (born 2 April 1981) is a Danish politician, who is a member of the Folketing for the Liberal Alliance. He was elected into the Folketing in the 2022 Danish general election.
