= Nick Zimmermann =

Danish politician

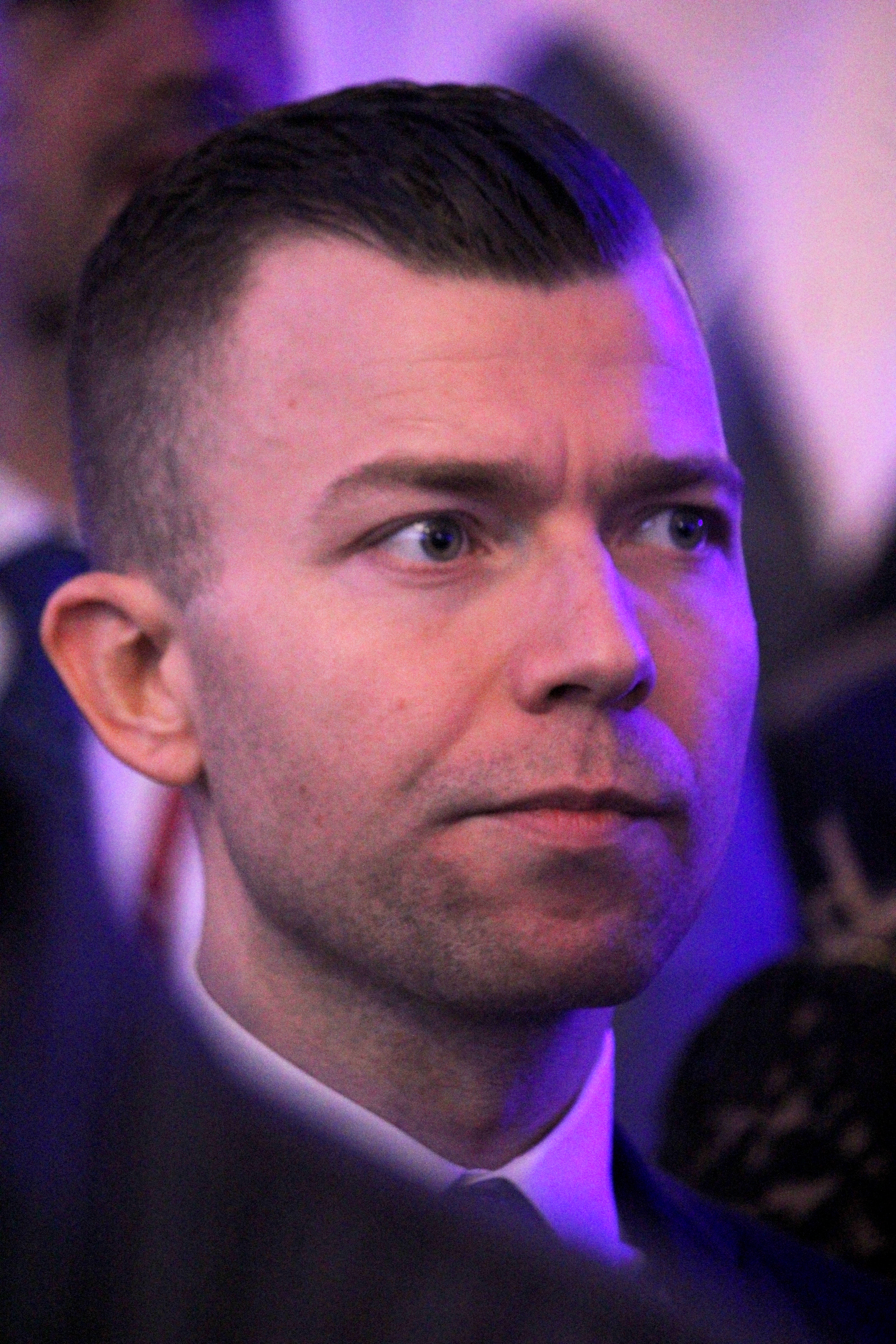
- Zimmermann in 2026

Member of the Folketing
- Incumbent
- Assumed office 1 November 2022
- Constituency: East Jutland

Personal details
- Born: August 30, 1994 (age 31) Aarhus
- Children: 1

Nick Zimmermann (born 30 August 1994) is a Danish politician serving as Member of the Folketing for the Danish People's Party since the 2022 general election.

== Career ==
Zimmermann, a logistics and storage operator by profession, started his career in politics in 2021 when he won election to the municipal council of Randers Municipality with 90 personal votes. A year later in 2022, Zimmermann won election to the Folketing with 231. personal votes.

== Personal life ==
Zimmermann is engaged and has one child.
