= Britt Bager =

Danish politician

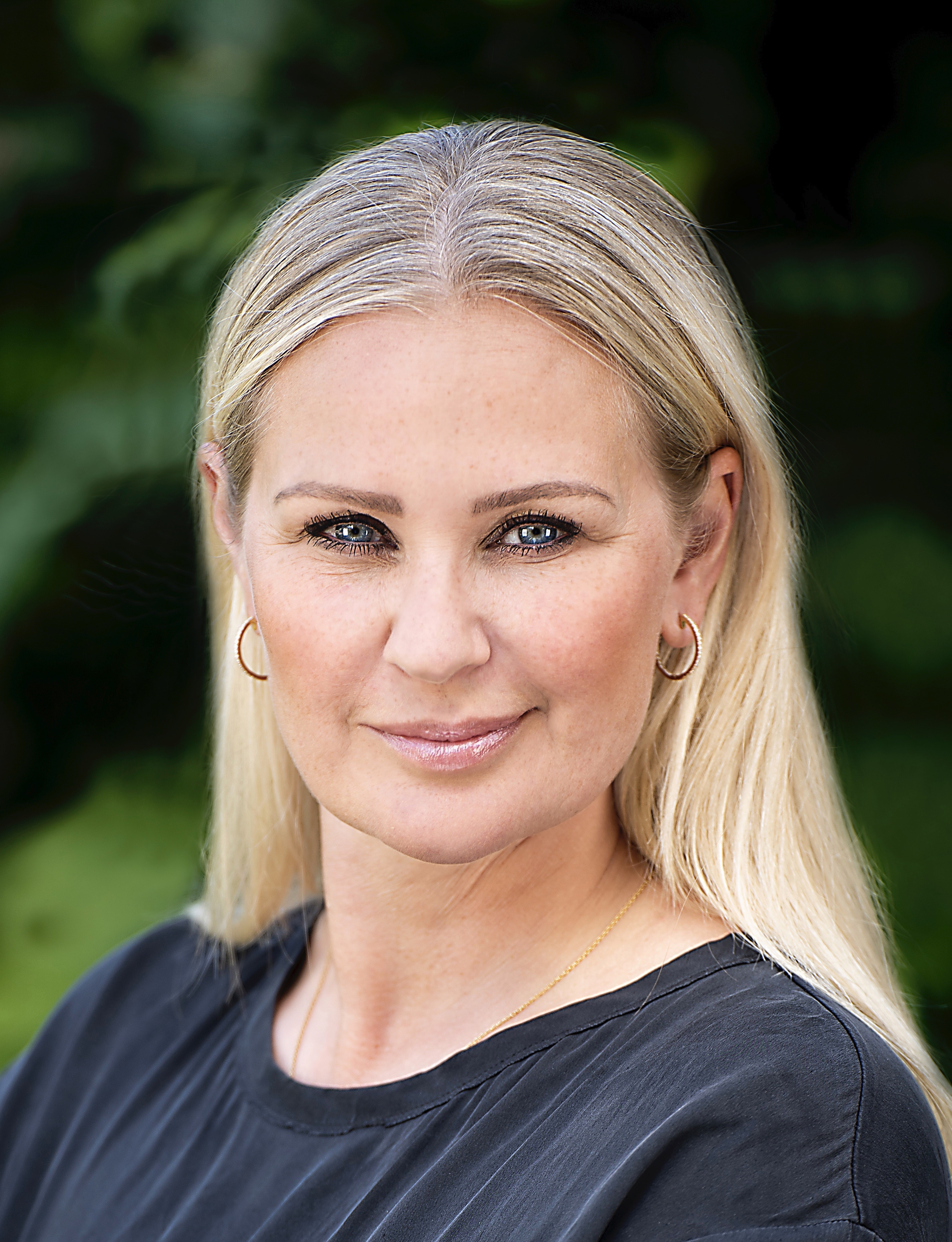
- Britt Bager

Member of the Folketing
- Incumbent
- Assumed office 18 June 2015
- Constituency: East Jutland

Personal details
- Born: 16 August 1976 (age 49) Grenaa, Denmark
- Party: Conservative People's Party; Venstre (until 2021)

Britt Bager (born 16 August 1976) is a Danish politician, who is a member of the Folketing for the Conservative People's Party political party. She was elected into the Folketing in the 2015 Danish general election for the Venstre political party, but switched to the Conservative People's Party in 2021.

== Political career ==
Bager first ran in the 2015 election, where she was elected after receiving 7,306 personal votes. She was reelected in the 2019 election with 10,490 votes cast for her.

In 2021 she left Venstre to join the Conservative People's Party.
