= Sofie Lippert =

Danish politician (born 1995)

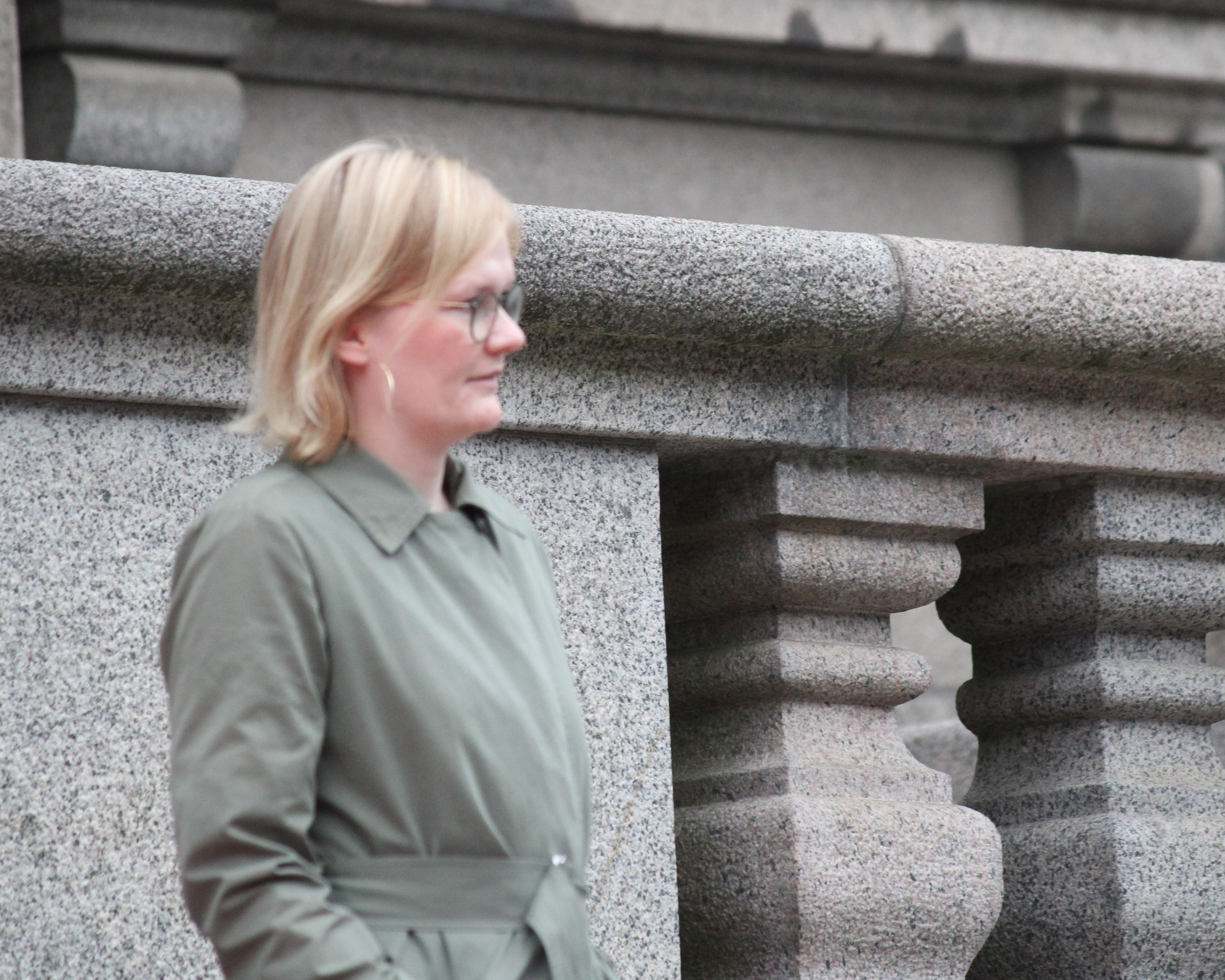
- Lippert in 2025

Member of the Folketing
- Incumbent
- Assumed office 1 November 2022
- Constituency: East Jutland

Personal details
- Born: 20 December 1995 (age 30) Copenhagen, Denmark
- Party: Green Left
- Education: Aarhus University
- Website: sf.dk/politiker/sofie-lippert/

Sofie Lippert Troelsen (born 20 December 1995) is a Danish politician and member of the Folketing, the national legislature. A member of the Green Left party, she has represented East Jutland since November 2022.

Lippert was born on 20 December 1995 in Copenhagen. She grew up in Åbyhøj in Aarhus and was educated at Gammelgaardsskolen and Århus Statsgymnasium. She has a Bachelor of Mathematics degree from the Aarhus University (2019). She was a broadcaster on Radio24syv (2020–2022), political consultant for the Danish IT Society (2021), student assistant at the University of Copenhagen (2021–2022), and an assistant teacher at Gentofte HF (2021).

Electoral history of Sofie Lippert
Election	Constituency	Party	Votes	Result
2017 local	Aarhus Municipality	Socialist People's Party	688	Not elected
2022 general	East Jutland	Green Left	2,338	Not elected (Note: Lippert entered the Folketing as one of the Green Left's compensatory seats.)
2026 general	East Jutland	Green Left	4,516	Elected
