= Tilde Bork =

Danish author and politician

Member of the Folketing
- In office 18 June 2015 – 5 June 2019
- Constituency: East Jutland

Personal details
- Born: 3 August 1993 (age 32) Sorø, Denmark
- Party: Danish People's Party

Tilde Ladegaard Bork (born 3 August 1993 in Sorø) is a Danish politician, who was a member of the Folketing for the Danish People's Party from 2015 to 2019.

== Political career ==
Bork sat in the regional council of Central Jutland from 2014 to 2016. She was elected into parliament at the 2015 election, where she received 3,198 votes. She didn't run again at the 2019 election, stating that she wanted to get more work experience before continuing her political work.
