= Kim Christiansen (politician) =

Danish politician (born 1946)

Member of the Folketing
- In office 8 February 2005 – 5 June 2019
- Constituency: East Jutland (2007–2019); Århus (2005–2007)

Personal details
- Born: 14 September 1956 (age 69) Slagelse, Denmark
- Party: Danish People's Party

Kim Christiansen (born 14 September 1956 in Slagelse) is a Danish politician, who was a member of the Folketing for the Danish People's Party from 2005 to 2019.

== Political career ==
Christiansen was a member of Mariager Municipality from 2001 to 2006, where most of the municipality was merged with Arden, Hadsund, Hobro and parts of Aalestrup and Nørager Municipality. In this new merged municipality, named Mariagerfjord Municipality, Christiansen sat in the municipal council from 2006 to 2011. He was first elected into national parliament in the 2005 Danish general election, and reelected in 2007, 2011 and 2015. In the 2019 election, he received 1,156 votes, but the Danish People's Party lost 21 seats, including Christiansen's.
