= Jonas Dahl =

Danish politician

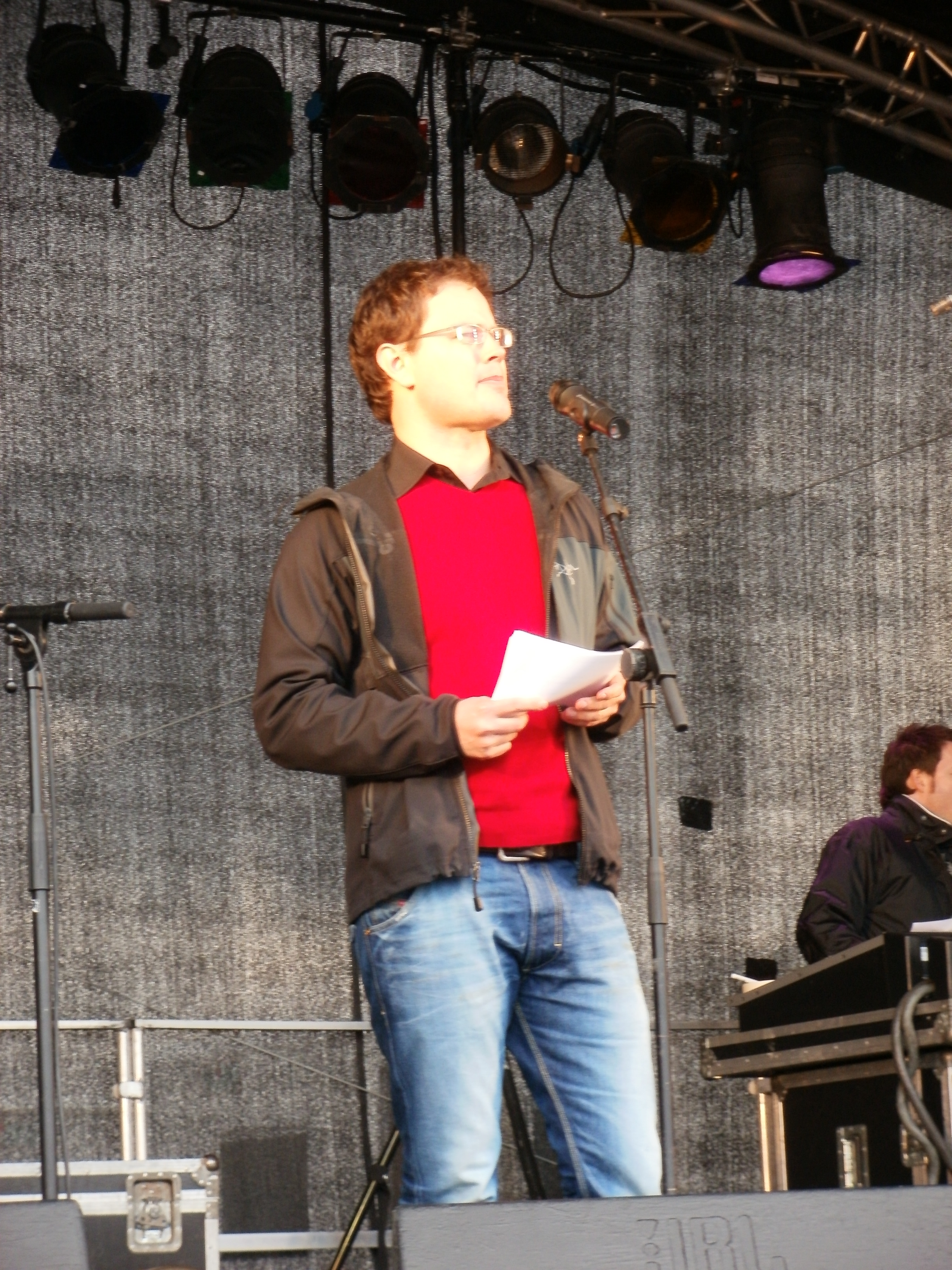
- Dahl in 2010

Minister for Taxation
- In office 12 December 2013 – 3 February 2014

Member of the Folketing
- In office 13 November 2007 – 7 August 2016
- Constituency: East Jutland

Personal details
- Born: 26 February 1978 (age 48) Randers, Denmark
- Party: Socialist People's Party

Jonas Dahl (born 26 February 1978 in Randers) is a Danish politician. He was Minister for Taxation in the Cabinet of Helle Thorning-Schmidt from 12 December 2013 until 3 February 2014. He was a member of the Folketing representing the Socialist People's Party from 2007 to 2016.

== Political career ==
Dahl was a member of the regional council of Region of Central Jutland from 2006 to 2007. He was first elected into parliament at the 2007 Danish general election, and reelected in 2011 and 2015. In 2016 he left parliament to become director of a hospital in Randers.

Party political offices
Preceded by Holger K. Nielsen	Minister for Taxation of Denmark; 2013–2014	Succeeded by Morten Østergaard
