= Jens Joel =

Danish politician (born 1978)

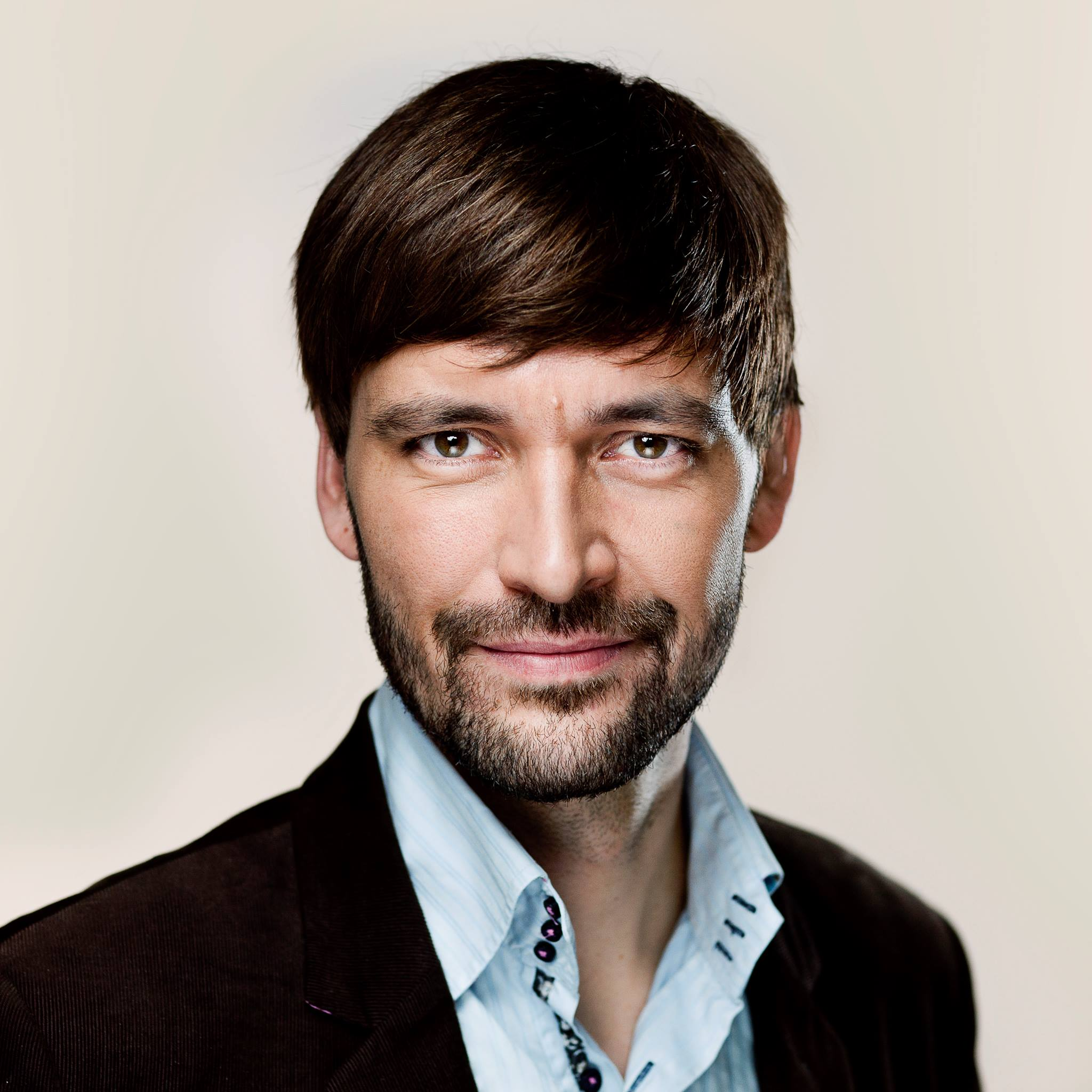

Member of the Folketing
- Incumbent
- Assumed office 15 September 2011
- Constituency: East Jutland

Personal details
- Born: Jens Joel Sand; 12 May 1978 (age 48) Odense, Denmark
- Party: Social Democrats

Jens Joel Sand (born 12 May 1978) is a Danish politician, who is a member of the Folketing for the Social Democrats political party. He was elected into parliament at the 2011 Danish general election.

== Political career ==
Joel was first elected into parliament in the 2011 election. He was reelected in 2015 and 2019.
