= Thomas Monberg =

Danish politician (born 1976)

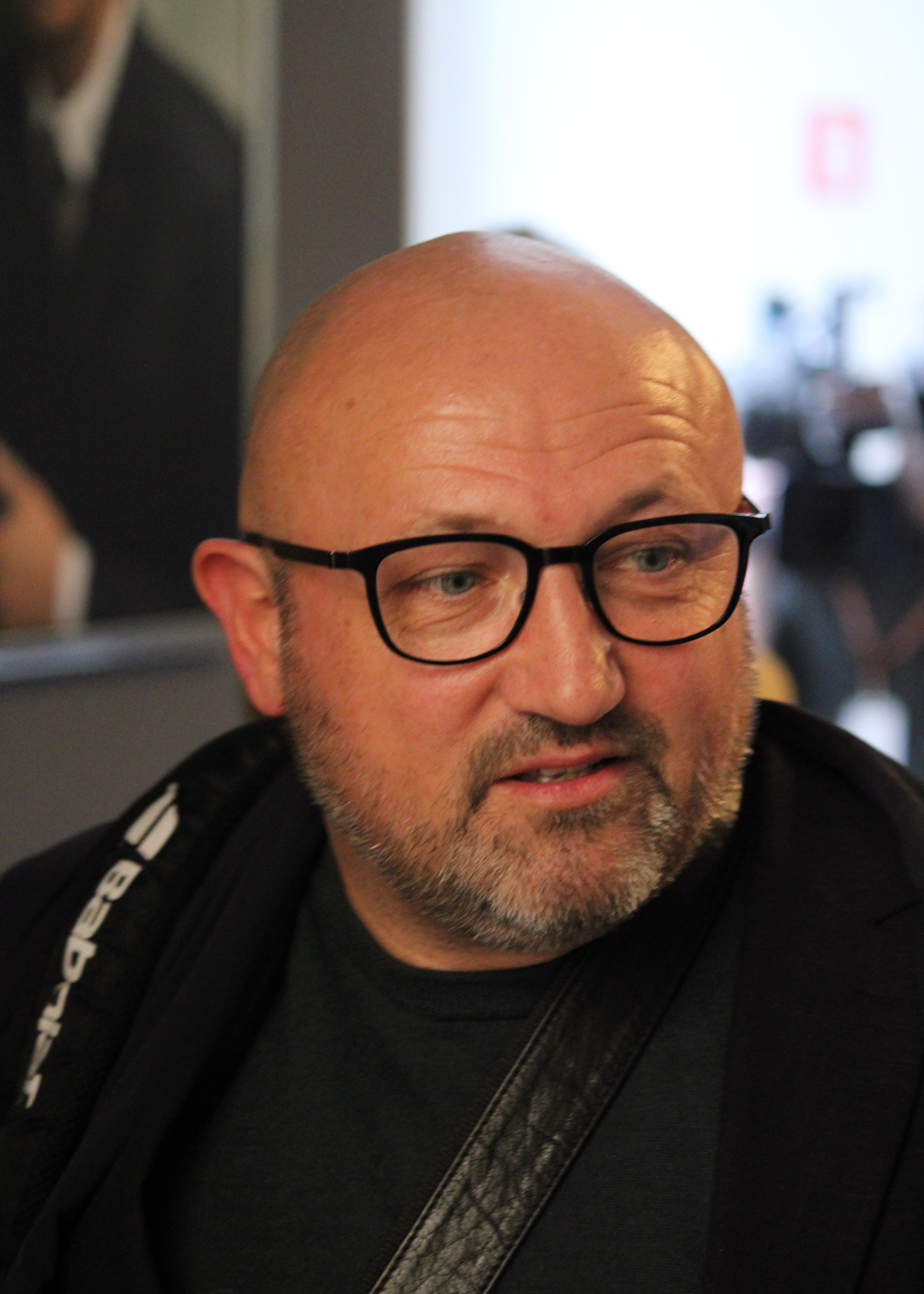
- Monberg in 2026

Member of the Folketing
- Incumbent
- Assumed office 1 November 2022

Personal details
- Born: 19 April 1976 (age 50) Horsens, Denmark
- Party: Social Democrats
- Occupation: Politician

Thomas Monberg (born 19 April 1976) is a Danish politician who has been a member of the Folketing for the Social Democrats since 2022.

Monberg is his party's spokesman on housing.

== See also ==
- List of members of the Folketing, 2022–present
