= Michael Aastrup Jensen =

Danish politician

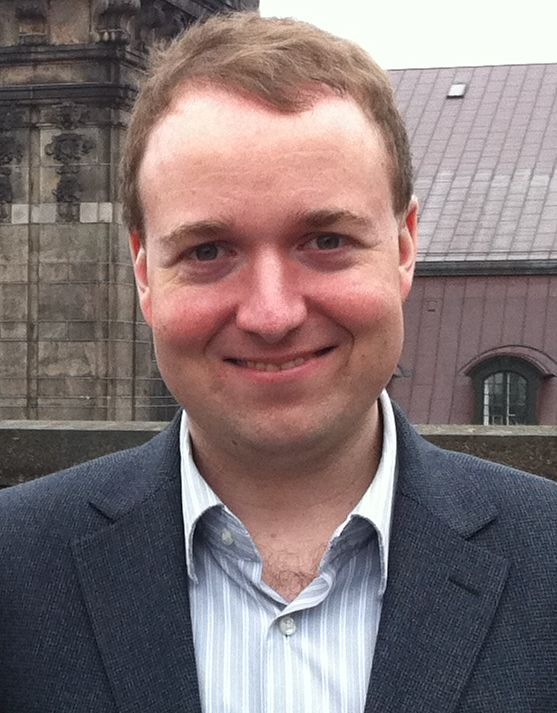

Danish ambassador to the Council of Europe

Former Parliamentary career
- Constituency: East Jutland (2005–2025)

Former Mayor Randers Municipality

Personal details
- Born: 16 March 1976 (age 50) Roskilde, Denmark
- Party: The Liberals Venstre

Michael Aastrup Jensen (born 16 March 1976) is the Danish ambassador to the Council of Europe (CoE). He is a former politician, a member of the Folketing for the political party Venstre and the former chairman of the Foreign Policy Committee. He was elected into parliament at the 2005 Danish general election.

== Political career ==
Aastrup Jensen been politically active since he as a 14-year-old joined the Young Liberals and the Liberal Party in Randers. In subsequent years he held various positions within these organizations.

In 1998–2006 he was a Member of Randers municipal council and was appointed mayor in 2001. At the time he became the youngest mayor ever in Denmark.

=== Member of Parliament, 2005–2025 ===
Aastrup Jensen has been a Member of Parliament for the Liberal Party since 2005. Since the 2015 Danish elections, Aastrup Jensen has been his parliamentary group's spokesman on foreign affairs. He is also a member of numerous committees, including the committee of Europe. Michael Aastrup Jensen was re-elected in the 2022 Danish election with 5,795 personal votes. After the election, he was once again appointed Foreign Affairs Spokesman, and he was also appointed Chairman of the Foreign Policy Committee. In June 2025 Aastrup Jensen gave up his mandate in parliament.

== Career as Ambassador ==
The 1.st of July Aastrup Jensen became the danish ambassador to the Council of Europe (CoE). He was appointed by the government, to serve as the danish permanent representative to the council. When assuming the role as ambassador, Aastrup Jensen stepped down from his political mandate, and now works under the Ministry of Foreign Affairs.
