= Kirsten Brosbøl =

Danish politician (born 1977)

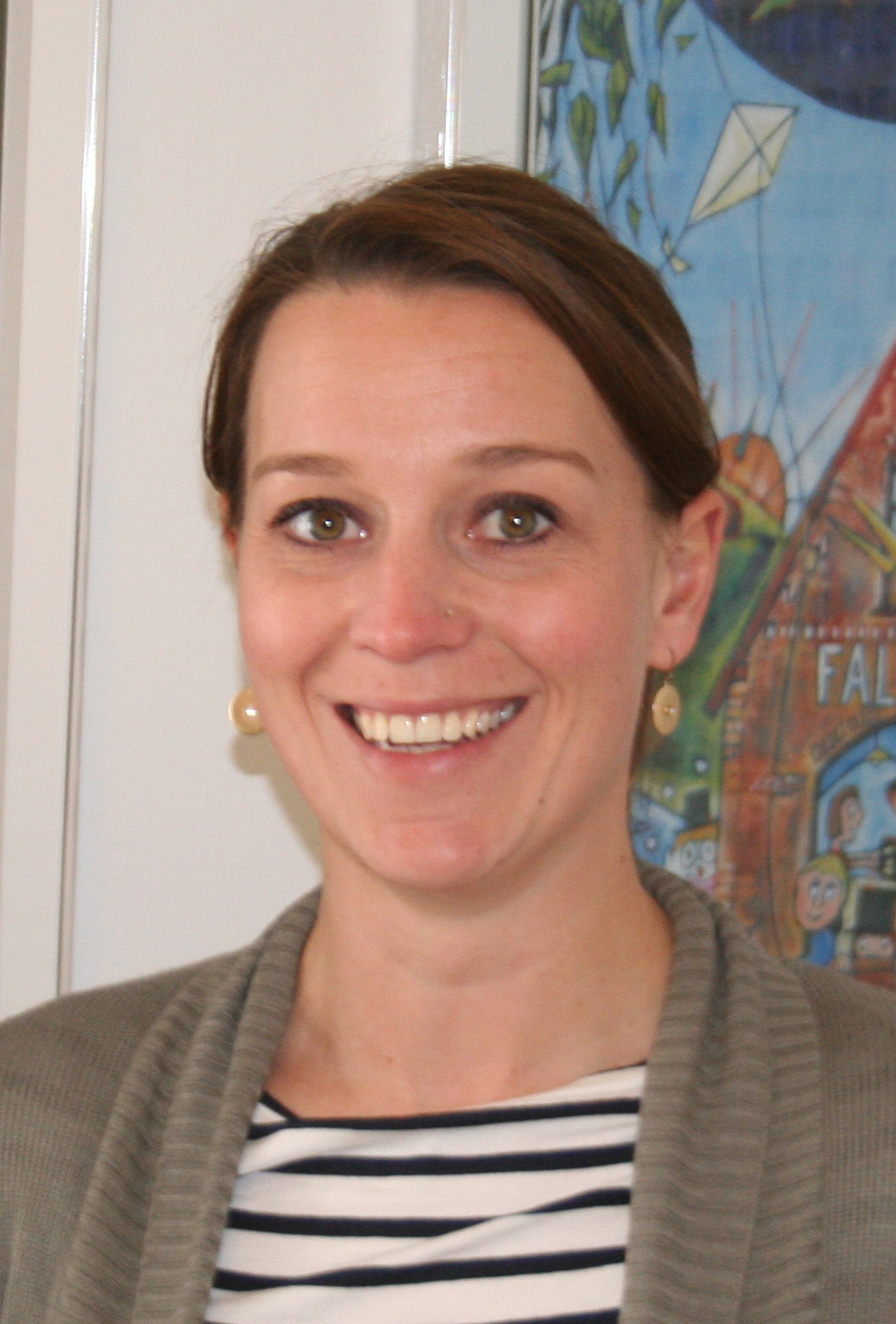

Minister for the Environment
- In office 2 February 2014 – 28 June 2015
- Prime Minister: Helle Thorning-Schmidt
- Preceded by: Ida Auken
- Succeeded by: Eva Kjer Hansen

Member of the Folketing
- In office 8 February 2005 – 5 June 2019
- Constituency: East Jutland (2007—2019); Aarhus (2005—2007)

Personal details
- Born: December 14, 1977 (age 48) Odder, Denmark
- Party: Social Democratic Party
- Education: Roskilde University; University of Sussex

Kirsten Brosbøl (born 14 December 1977 in Odder) is a Danish politician. She represented the Social Democrats in the Folketing from 2005 to 2019, and served as Minister for the Environment from 2014 to 2015.

== Political career ==
From 2001 to 2004, Brosbøl worked as a student assistant for the Social Democrats in the Folketing, and from 2004 to 2005 she worked as a political consultant for the Danish Social Democrats in the European Parliament. She was first elected into parliament at the 2005 Danish general election with 5,479 votes. She sat in parliament until 2019. From 2014 to 2015 she served as Minister for the Environment.

== Personal life ==
Kirsten Brosbøl was born in Odder, Denmark. Her father is bricklayer and shoemaker Lars Peter Brosbøl and her mother is nurse Bente Skødt Jensen. She studied mathematics at Odder Gymnasium. She has a cand.scient.soc. degree in sociology with a focus on international development from Roskilde University (1997–2005), and an MA in peace and conflict studies from the University of Sussex in the United Kingdom (2002–2003).

Political offices
Preceded by Ida Auken	Minister for the Environment; 2014 - 2015	Succeeded by Eva Kjer Hansen
