= Yahya Hassan =

Danish poet and writer (1995–2020)

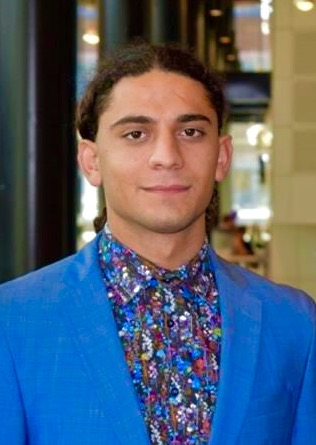
- Yahya Hassan in October 2015
- Born: 19 May 1995; Aarhus, Denmark
- Died: 29 April 2020 (aged 24); Aarhus, Denmark
- Occupations: Poet; political activist
- Writing career
- Period: 2011–2020
- Genre: Poetry
- Notable work: Yahya Hassan

Signature
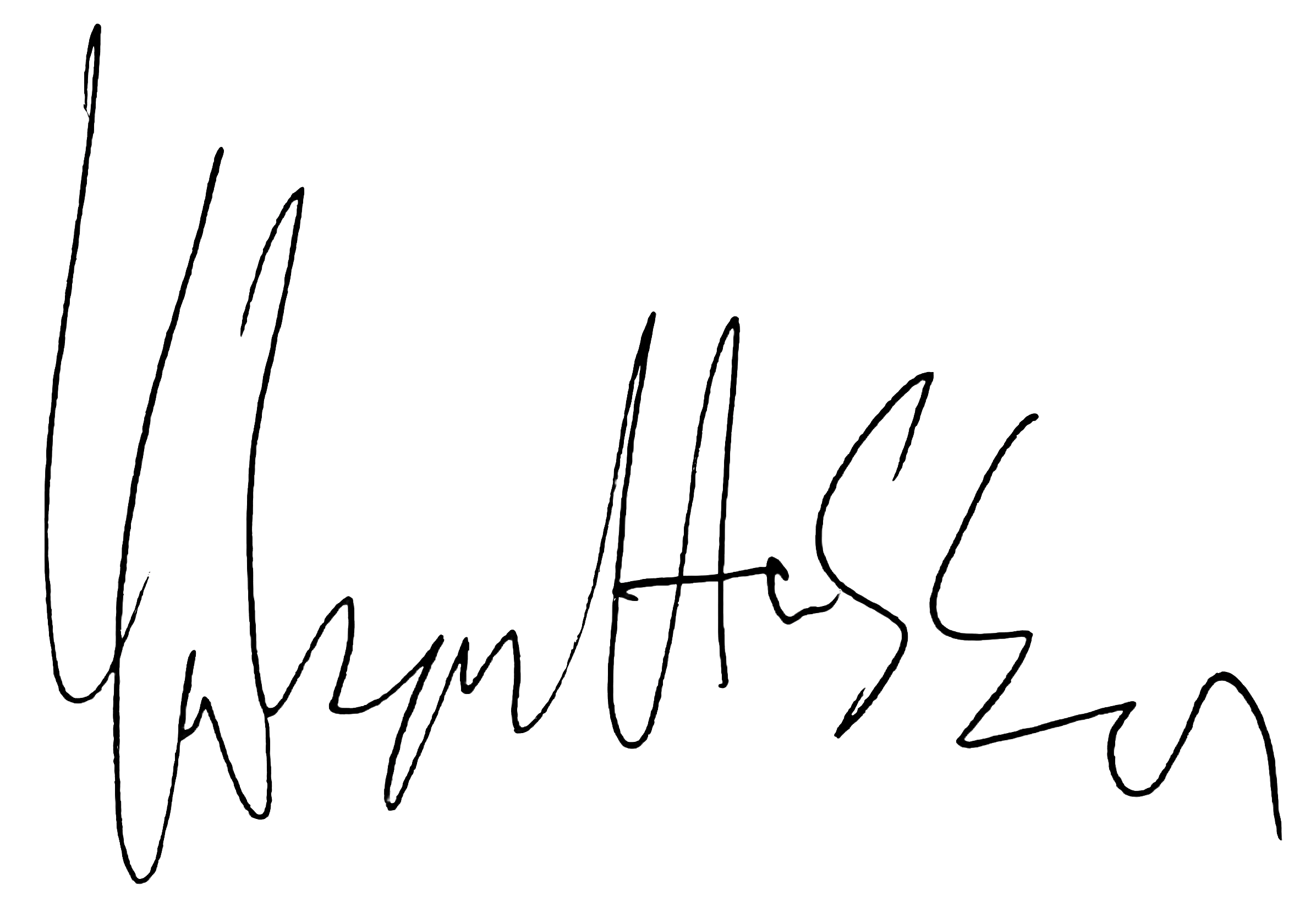

Yahya Hassan (19 May 1995 – 29 April 2020) was a Danish poet and political activist of Palestinian descent, whose poems and public statements criticizing both Islam and Danish policies on migration and participation in armed conflicts made him a much-debated and controversial figure.

His most notable work, Yahya Hassan, as of 2013 was the best-selling debut poetry collection in Denmark, and has been printed in more than 120,000 copies (middle of 2015).

== Early life ==
Yahya Hassan was born to a family of Muslim Palestinian immigrants, who had fled to Lebanon due to the Israeli occupation of Palestine, and who moved to Denmark in the 1980s. He was born in Aarhus, the second largest city in Denmark. He had four siblings, and his father frequently physically abused him. Hassan grew up in a religious environment, but soon abandoned religion. He was institutionalized for juvenile delinquency in Solhaven in Farsø, where educators first supported his literary talent. At 16, Hassan had an affair with 38-year-old educator Louise Østergaard, which led to Østergaard's dismissal and divorce. Hassan attended a "Rap Academy" and various workshops for creative writing.

== Publications and reception ==
He published a first volume with Brønderslev Forfatterskole Et godt sted at dø ("a good place to die") in 2011, but became widely known in Denmark with his first volume published with the reputable Gyldendal publishing house, in 2013.

Literary scholar Tue Andersen Nexø described Hassan's longer works as "almost Walt Whitman-like." The volume was a best-seller and received favourable criticism, and his readings (done in an idiosyncratic style) were well-attended.

The poems are concerned with his upbringing in the "ghetto" of Aarhus V, with attacks on his parents' generation and on Islam. This has resulted in criticism and death threats on the part of Danish Muslims, and Hassan was placed under police protection. Odense city library cancelled a planned reading due to the threat of attacks. The cancellation led to a parliamentary debate in the Folketing, on Islamist threats impinging on the freedom of speech in Denmark.

Also in November 2013, Hassan was assaulted and injured by another Danish citizen of Palestinian descent, one Isaac Meyer, born Abdul Basit Abu-Lifa, who had a previous conviction for terrorism. Meyer had received a seven-year sentence in the 2005 Glostrup case, but had been released on parole in 2010. The attacker was convicted for assault.

The poetry collection Yahya Hassan 2 was published on 8 November 2019, again to general critical acclaim.

== Politics ==
On 7 April 2015, Hassan announced that he had joined the newly formed Danish political party, Nationalpartiet. On 9 February 2016, party leader Kashif Ahmad announced that Hassan had been expelled from the party following an arrest for driving under the influence.

== Death ==
Hassan was found dead in his apartment in Aarhus on 29 April 2020. The police do not believe the death to be a criminal act. He had supposedly converted back to Islam prior to his death.

== Bibliography ==
- Et godt sted at dø ("a good place to die"), Brønderslev Forfatterskole, 2011, ISBN 978-87-993537-3-6
- Yahya Hassan : Digte, Gyldendal, 2013, ISBN 978-87-02-15352-1
- Yahya Hassan 2, Gyldendal, 2019, ISBN 9788702265866
