= Copenhagen (Folketing constituency) =

Constituency of the Folketing, the national legislature of Denmark

- København
- Constituency for the Folketing
- Location of Copenhagen within Denmark
- Municipality: List: Copenhagen; Dragør; Frederiksberg; Tårnby
- Region: Capital
- Population: 836,552 (2026)
- Electorate: 555,730 (2026)
- Area: 183 km^{2} (2022)

Current constituency
- Created: 2007
- Seats: List: 17 (2022–present); 16 (2015–2022); 15 (2007–2015)
- Members of the Folketing: List: Ida Auken (A); Lisbeth Bech-Nielsen (F); Helle Bonnesen (C); Pelle Dragsted (Ø); Pia Olsen Dyhr (F); Nanna W. Gotfredsen (M); Jette Gottlieb (Ø); Peter Hummelgaard (A); Jan E. Jørgensen (V); Rosa Lund (Ø); Samira Nawa (B); Ole Birk Olesen (I); Christina Olumeko (Å); Mette Reissmann (A); Franciska Rosenkilde (Å); Pernille Rosenkrantz-Theil (A); Alexander Ryle (I); Jon Stephensen (M); Linea Søgaard-Lidell (V); Carl Valentin (F)
- Created from: List: Copenhagen County; Eastern; Southern; Western

Copenhagen (Danish: København) is one of the 12 multi-member constituencies of the Folketing, the national legislature of Denmark. The constituency was established in 2007 following the public administration structural reform. It consists of the municipalities of Copenhagen, Dragør, Frederiksberg and Tårnby. The constituency currently elects 17 of the 179 members of the Folketing using the open party-list proportional representation electoral system. At the 2026 general election it had 555,730 registered electors.

== Electoral system ==
Copenhagen currently elects 17 of the 179 members of the Folketing using the open party-list proportional representation electoral system. Constituency seats are allocated using the D'Hondt method. Compensatory seats are calculated based on the national vote and are allocated using the Sainte-Laguë method, initially at the provincial level and finally at the constituency level. Only parties that reach any one of three thresholds stipulated by section 77 of the Folketing (Parliamentary) Elections Act - winning at least one constituency seat; obtaining at least the Hare quota (valid votes in province/number of constituency seats in province) in two of the three provinces; or obtaining at least 2% of the national vote - compete for compensatory seats.

== Election results ==
=== Summary ===
Election	Red–Green Ø			Green Left F			Alternative Å			Social Democrats A			Social Liberals B			Venstre V			Conservative People's C			Liberal Alliance I / Y			Danish People's O		
Election	Votes	%	Seats	Votes	%	Seats	Votes	%	Seats	Votes	%	Seats	Votes	%	Seats	Votes	%	Seats	Votes	%	Seats	Votes	%	Seats	Votes	%	Seats
2026	77,227	16.59%	3	62,111	13.36%	3	30,627	6.58%	1	71,298	15.31%	3	55,768	11.97%	2	16,975	3.64%	0	41,744	8.96%	2	37,491	8.05%	1	25,393	5.45%	1
2022	62,611	13.77%	3	52,080	11.45%	2	42,769	9.41%	2	86,226	18.96%	4	34,031	7.48%	1	38,319	8.43%	1	22,797	5.01%	1	38,204	8.40%	1	7,072	1.56%	0
2019	75,935	16.78%	3	52,176	11.53%	2	29,405	6.50%	1	77,879	17.21%	3	74,135	16.39%	3	67,819	14.99%	3	23,829	5.27%	1	11,655	2.58%	0	19,181	4.24%	0
2015	71,140	16.41%	3	28,260	6.52%	1	48,475	11.18%	2	96,753	22.32%	4	40,578	9.36%	1	44,721	10.32%	2	13,471	3.11%	0	37,935	8.75%	1	49,575	11.44%	2
2011	70,831	16.62%	3	52,870	12.40%	2				80,705	18.94%	3	71,264	16.72%	3	64,914	15.23%	2	23,262	5.46%	0	24,882	5.84%	1	35,887	8.42%	1
2007	26,963	6.67%	1	84,843	21.00%	4				97,903	24.23%	4	35,858	8.88%	1	55,311	13.69%	2	40,811	10.10%	1	17,223	4.26%	0	42,906	10.62%	2

(Excludes compensatory seats)

=== Detailed ===
==== 2026 ====
Results of the 2026 general election held on 24 March 2026:

Party		Votes per nomination district												Total Votes	%	Seats		
Party		Bispeb- jerg	Brøns- høj	Fal- koner	Inner City	Nørre- bro	Øster- bro	Slots	Sundby- øster	Sundby- vester	Tårnby	Valby	Vester- bro	Total Votes	%	Con.	Com.	Tot.
Red–Green Alliance	Ø	7,606	7,776	4,395	5,446	13,389	6,516	3,967	5,344	6,956	1,953	5,300	8,579	77,227	16.59%	3	0	3
Social Democrats	A	3,759	7,717	5,140	4,504	4,680	7,271	5,350	6,021	6,987	8,833	5,517	5,519	71,298	15.31%	3	0	3
Green Left	F	4,272	7,196	3,841	3,876	6,612	6,156	3,592	5,206	6,136	3,661	5,129	6,434	62,111	13.36%	3	0	3
Danish Social Liberal Party	B	3,167	4,950	4,870	4,838	6,610	6,722	3,586	4,057	5,082	1,621	3,927	6,338	55,768	11.97%	2	1	3
Conservative People's Party	C	1,539	3,461	4,430	3,729	2,586	5,576	4,156	2,793	3,439	3,520	2,858	3,657	41,744	8.96%	2	0	2
Moderates	M	1,485	3,154	3,416	3,795	2,617	4,897	2,805	2,776	3,658	3,361	2,574	3,745	38,283	8.22%	1	1	2
Liberal Alliance	I	1,420	2,698	2,988	3,789	2,282	4,897	2,683	3,007	3,813	2,901	2,933	4,080	37,491	8.05%	1	1	2
The Alternative	Å	2,601	2,796	1,859	2,648	4,720	2,974	1,545	2,244	2,852	787	2,076	3,525	30,627	6.58%	1	0	1
Danish People's Party	O	1,530	2,777	1,219	1,213	1,277	2,083	1,696	2,288	2,525	1,349	2,216	1,768	25,393	5.45%	1	0	1
Venstre	V	570	1,373	1,677	1,647	934	2,163	1,570	1,211	1,610	4,801	1,160	1,517	16,975	3.64%	0	0	0
Citizens' Party	H	248	355	161	194	196	298	213	358	374	530	278	289	3,494	0.75%	0	0	0
Denmark Democrats	Æ	209	342	178	153	151	241	216	283	331	690	301	238	3,334	0.72%	0	0	0
Theresa Scavenius (Independent)		128	161	101	133	237	176	119	143	166	60	108	217	1,749	0.38%	0	0	0
Rasmus Paludan (Independent)		14	13	10	14	13	9	10	21	14	11	13	14	156	0.03%	0	0	0
Rashid Ali (Independent)		3	29	3	0	6	8	3	2	5	1	8	7	75	0.02%	0	0	0
John Erik Wagner (Independent)		3	5	1	0	1	0	3	11	4	0	0	6	34	0.01%	0	0	0
Valid votes		28,554	44,803	33,581	35,979	46,311	49,987	31,514	35,765	43,952	34,273	34,398	45,934	465,759	100.00%	17	3	20
Blank votes		271	401	296	196	377	242	350	378	409	336	361	308	3,875	0.82%			
Rejected votes – other		84	114	96	80	83	92	82	86	119	92	73	90	1,046	0.22%			
Total polled		28,909	45,318	33,973	36,255	46,771	50,441	31,838	36,229	44,480	34,701	34,832	46,332	470,680	84.70%			
Registered electors		36,823	55,076	37,944	42,382	54,713	57,695	37,209	43,001	53,881	41,022	41,925	53,884	555,730				
Turnout		79.68%	82.28%	89.53%	85.54%	85.48%	87.43%	85.57%	84.25%	82.55%	84.59%	83.08%	85.98%	84.70%				

The following candidates were elected:

- Constituency seats - Sophie Hæstorp Andersen (A), 2,187 votes; Ida Auken (A), 11,286 votes; Lisbeth Bech-Nielsen (F), 5,494 votes; Nanna Bonde (F), 4,166 votes; Helle Bonnesen (C), 2,852 votes; Pelle Dragsted (Ø), 31,961 votes; Jakob Engel-Schmidt (M), 8,132 votes; Allan Feldt (O), 1,679 votes; Peter Hummelgaard (A), 11,637 votes; Magnus Georg Jensen (B), 4,491 votes; Rosa Lund (Ø), 13,110 votes; Samira Nawa (B), 10,372 votes; Franciska Rosenkilde (Å), 11,385 votes; Leila Stockmarr (Ø), 4,897 votes; Anders Storgaard (C), 3,099 votes; Mads Strange (I), 4,488 votes; and Carl Valentin (F), 3,271 votes.
- Compensatory seats - Ellen Emilie (M), 1,175 votes; Ole Birk Olesen (I), 2,886 votes; and Thomas Rohden (B), 4,136 votes.

==== 2022 ====
Results of the 2022 general election held on 1 November 2022:

Party		Votes per nomination district												Total Votes	%	Seats		
Party		Bispeb- jerg	Brøns- høj	Fal- koner	Inner City	Nørre- bro	Øster- bro	Slots	Sundby- øster	Sundby- vester	Tårnby	Valby	Vester- bro	Total Votes	%	Con.	Com.	Tot.
Social Democrats	A	4,923	10,176	5,717	4,869	5,660	8,414	6,330	7,249	8,212	11,137	7,107	6,432	86,226	18.96%	4	0	4
Red–Green Alliance	Ø	5,744	5,792	3,624	4,998	10,750	5,595	3,259	4,426	5,532	1,482	4,121	7,288	62,611	13.77%	3	0	3
Green Left	F	3,454	5,928	3,611	3,533	5,694	5,485	3,037	4,190	5,067	2,670	4,244	5,167	52,080	11.45%	2	1	3
Moderates	M	1,842	3,630	3,730	3,847	3,279	5,397	3,097	3,336	4,171	3,404	3,093	4,082	42,908	9.44%	2	0	2
The Alternative	Å	3,109	3,355	2,927	4,068	6,947	4,378	2,039	3,229	3,771	926	2,677	5,343	42,769	9.41%	2	0	2
Venstre	V	1,501	3,197	3,501	3,295	2,320	4,751	3,340	2,809	3,664	3,611	2,984	3,346	38,319	8.43%	1	1	2
Liberal Alliance	I	1,514	2,824	3,162	3,963	2,498	5,002	2,861	2,875	3,944	2,558	2,931	4,072	38,204	8.40%	1	1	2
Danish Social Liberal Party	B	1,881	2,961	2,950	3,027	3,967	4,187	2,205	2,486	3,263	966	2,409	3,729	34,031	7.48%	1	0	1
Conservative People's Party	C	829	1,866	2,735	2,011	1,123	2,749	2,769	1,448	1,893	2,120	1,575	1,679	22,797	5.01%	1	0	1
Independent Greens	Q	1,273	1,658	349	304	1,836	529	504	484	1,129	349	897	742	10,054	2.21%	0	0	0
Denmark Democrats	Æ	501	922	432	338	358	558	608	739	812	1,824	706	536	8,334	1.83%	0	0	0
The New Right	D	455	756	390	401	370	682	478	692	773	1,244	643	628	7,512	1.65%	0	0	0
Danish People's Party	O	504	887	360	290	352	585	501	589	641	1,349	581	433	7,072	1.56%	0	0	0
Christian Democrats	K	80	130	59	62	75	116	82	88	83	73	65	58	971	0.21%	0	0	0
Flemming Blicher (Independent)		44	53	25	45	68	56	44	57	62	38	55	53	600	0.13%	0	0	0
Tom Gillesberg (Independent)		8	22	9	20	26	15	13	14	22	6	10	17	182	0.04%	0	0	0
Valid votes		27,662	44,157	33,581	35,071	45,323	48,499	31,167	34,711	43,039	33,757	34,098	43,605	454,670	100.00%	17	3	20
Blank votes		390	637	296	325	531	554	350	479	596	430	563	502	5,653	1.22%			
Rejected votes – other		121	150	96	98	177	122	86	109	194	115	133	129	1,530	0.33%			
Total polled		28,173	44,944	33,973	35,494	46,031	49,175	31,603	35,299	43,829	34,302	34,794	44,236	461,853	84.01%			
Registered electors		35,831	54,678	37,944	41,975	54,529	56,488	37,032	42,739	53,656	40,530	42,583	51,763	549,748				
Turnout		78.63%	82.20%	89.53%	84.56%	84.42%	87.05%	85.34%	82.59%	81.69%	84.63%	81.71%	85.46%	84.01%				

Votes per municipality:

Party		Votes per municipality				Total Votes
Party		Copen- hagen	Dragør	Freder- iksberg	Tårnby	Total Votes
Social Democrats	A	63,042	2,141	12,047	8,996	86,226
Red–Green Alliance	Ø	54,246	266	6,883	1,216	62,611
Green Left	F	42,762	637	6,648	2,033	52,080
Moderates	M	32,677	1,280	6,827	2,124	42,908
The Alternative	Å	36,877	247	4,966	679	42,769
Venstre	V	27,867	1,221	6,841	2,390	38,319
Liberal Alliance	I	29,623	959	6,023	1,599	38,204
Danish Social Liberal Party	B	27,910	323	5,155	643	34,031
Conservative People's Party	C	15,173	1,060	5,504	1,060	22,797
Independent Greens	Q	8,852	24	853	325	10,054
Denmark Democrats	Æ	5,470	423	1,040	1,401	8,334
The New Right	D	5,400	253	868	991	7,512
Danish People's Party	O	4,862	254	861	1,095	7,072
Christian Democrats	K	757	13	141	60	971
Flemming Blicher (Independent)		493	12	69	26	600
Tom Gillesberg (Independent)		154	0	22	6	182
Valid votes		356,165	9,113	64,748	24,644	454,670
Blank votes		4,577	70	646	360	5,653
Rejected votes – other		1,233	30	182	85	1,530
Total polled		361,975	9,213	65,576	25,089	461,853
Registered electors		434,242	10,372	74,976	30,158	549,748
Turnout		83.36%	88.83%	87.46%	83.19%	84.01%

The following candidates were elected:

- Constituency seats - Ida Auken (A), 9,879 votes; Helle Bonnesen (C), 2,783 votes; Pelle Dragsted (Ø), 15,558 votes; Pia Olsen Dyhr (F), 18,758 votes; Nanna W. Gotfredsen (M), 2,333 votes; Jette Gottlieb (Ø), 3,348 votes; Peter Hummelgaard (A), 9,321 votes; Jan E. Jørgensen (V), 10,151 votes; Rosa Lund (Ø), 14,611 votes; Samira Nawa (B), 6,302 votes; Ole Birk Olesen (I), 5,488 votes; Christina Olumeko (Å), 3,476 votes; Mette Reissmann (A), 3,347 votes; Franciska Rosenkilde (Å), 15,699 votes; Pernille Rosenkrantz-Theil (A), 5,361 votes; Jon Stephensen (M), 1,550 votes; and Carl Valentin (F), 2,631 votes.
- Compensatory seats - Lisbeth Bech-Nielsen (F), 2,279 votes; Alexander Ryle (I), 1,948 votes; and Linea Søgaard-Lidell (V), 9,158 votes.

==== 2019 ====
Results of the 2019 general election held on 5 June 2019:

Party		Votes per nomination district												Total Votes	%	Seats		
Party		Bispeb- jerg	Brøns- høj	Fal- koner	Inner City	Nørre- bro	Øster- bro	Slots	Sundby- øster	Sundby- vester	Tårnby	Valby	Vester- bro	Total Votes	%	Con.	Com.	Tot.
Social Democrats	A	4,957	9,577	4,824	4,243	5,613	7,660	5,361	6,608	7,215	9,647	6,491	5,683	77,879	17.21%	3	0	3
Red–Green Alliance	Ø	6,879	7,169	4,159	6,078	13,550	6,808	3,860	5,435	6,390	2,039	5,048	8,520	75,935	16.78%	3	1	4
Danish Social Liberal Party	B	4,503	6,989	6,496	6,629	9,076	8,756	5,084	4,939	6,925	2,661	4,932	7,145	74,135	16.39%	3	0	3
Venstre	V	2,700	5,848	6,053	6,158	4,071	8,483	5,762	5,066	6,295	7,538	4,676	5,169	67,819	14.99%	3	0	3
Socialist People's Party	F	3,563	5,949	3,681	3,763	6,245	5,377	3,194	4,107	4,927	2,504	3,971	4,895	52,176	11.53%	2	1	3
The Alternative	Å	2,308	2,577	1,846	2,505	4,714	2,956	1,474	2,187	2,687	809	1,889	3,453	29,405	6.50%	1	0	1
Conservative People's Party	C	827	2,117	3,144	2,361	1,071	3,029	3,076	1,359	1,831	2,175	1,342	1,497	23,829	5.27%	1	0	1
Danish People's Party	O	1,228	2,579	1,055	654	928	1,432	1,348	1,679	1,758	3,871	1,573	1,076	19,181	4.24%	0	1	1
Liberal Alliance	I	528	925	935	1,152	776	1,467	962	894	1,326	687	843	1,160	11,655	2.58%	0	1	1
The New Right	D	437	755	435	422	371	636	471	480	571	840	512	487	6,417	1.42%	0	0	0
Hard Line	P	443	658	249	292	381	517	369	552	543	716	519	478	5,717	1.26%	0	0	0
Klaus Riskær Pedersen	E	286	407	273	389	408	391	292	382	429	377	329	419	4,382	0.97%	0	0	0
Christian Democrats	K	300	430	225	181	223	392	263	290	261	239	280	184	3,268	0.72%	0	0	0
Pierre Tavares (Independent)		27	32	11	20	27	28	27	31	32	18	29	23	305	0.07%	0	0	0
Tom Gillesberg (Independent)		16	13	8	16	33	7	11	21	16	4	9	13	167	0.04%	0	0	0
John Jørgensen (Independent)		10	8	2	7	17	7	4	1	5	4	6	9	80	0.02%	0	0	0
John Erik Wagner (Independent)		2	3	1	2	1	1	4	6	8	3	1	1	33	0.01%	0	0	0
Tommy Schou Christesen (Independent)		4	0	2	0	0	3	0	1	4	2	3	3	22	0.00%	0	0	0
Valid votes		29,018	46,036	33,399	34,872	47,505	47,950	31,562	34,038	41,223	34,134	32,453	40,215	452,405	100.00%	16	4	20
Blank votes		207	348	145	197	278	253	165	248	291	277	288	235	2,932	0.64%			
Rejected votes – other		114	163	73	100	138	161	82	119	132	93	136	108	1,419	0.31%			
Total polled		29,339	46,547	33,617	35,169	47,921	48,364	31,809	34,405	41,646	34,504	32,877	40,558	456,756	84.84%			
Registered electors		36,601	55,445	37,561	41,671	55,872	55,647	36,878	41,340	49,932	40,727	39,376	47,296	538,346				
Turnout		80.16%	83.95%	89.50%	84.40%	85.77%	86.91%	86.25%	83.22%	83.41%	84.72%	83.50%	85.75%	84.84%				

Votes per municipality:

Party		Votes per municipality				Total Votes
Party		Copen- hagen	Dragør	Freder- iksberg	Tårnby	Total Votes
Social Democrats	A	58,047	1,783	10,185	7,864	77,879
Red–Green Alliance	Ø	65,877	404	8,019	1,635	75,935
Danish Social Liberal Party	B	59,894	889	11,580	1,772	74,135
Venstre	V	48,466	2,804	11,815	4,734	67,819
Socialist People's Party	F	42,797	503	6,875	2,001	52,176
The Alternative	Å	25,276	198	3,320	611	29,405
Conservative People's Party	C	15,434	973	6,220	1,202	23,829
Danish People's Party	O	12,907	770	2,402	3,101	19,180
Liberal Alliance	I	9,071	248	1,897	439	11,655
The New Right	D	4,671	214	906	626	6,417
Hard Line	P	4,383	127	618	589	5,717
Klaus Riskær Pedersen	E	3,440	94	565	283	4,382
Christian Democrats	K	2,541	51	488	188	3,268
Pierre Tavares (Independent)		249	3	38	15	305
Tom Gillesberg (Independent)		144	1	19	3	167
John Jørgensen (Independent)		70	1	6	3	80
John Erik Wagner (Independent)		25	0	5	3	33
Tommy Schou Christesen (Independent)		18	0	2	2	22
Valid votes		353,310	9,063	64,960	25,071	452,404
Blank votes		2,345	43	310	234	2,932
Rejected votes – other		1,171	17	155	76	1,419
Total polled		356,826	9,123	65,425	25,381	456,755
Registered electors		423,180	10,275	74,439	30,452	538,346
Turnout		84.32%	88.79%	87.89%	83.35%	84.84%

The following candidates were elected:

- Constituency seats - Tommy Ahlers (V), 48,277 votes; Katarina Ammitzbøll (C), 6,377 votes; Ida Auken (B), 21,723 votes; Pia Olsen Dyhr (F), 20,047 votes; Uffe Elbæk (Å), 7,587 votes; Martin Geertsen (V), 4,550 votes; Peter Hummelgaard Thomsen (A), 11,611 votes; Jan E. Jørgensen (V), 8,321 votes; Rosa Lund (Ø), 7,532 votes; Rune Lund (Ø), 4,355 votes; Samira Nawa (B), 4,657 votes; Lars Aslan Rasmussen (A), 9,632 votes; Jens Rohde (B), 6,175 votes; Pernille Rosenkrantz-Theil (A), 28,955 votes; Pernille Skipper (Ø) 38,954 votes; and Carl Valentin (F), 2,074 votes.
- Compensatory seats - Simon Emil Ammitzbøll-Bille (I), 2,715 votes; Jette Gottlieb (Ø), 3,939 votes; Halime Oguz (F), 1,278 votes; and Peter Skaarup (O), 4,875 votes.

==== 2015 ====
Results of the 2015 general election held on 18 June 2015:

Party		Votes per nomination district												Total Votes	%	Seats		
Party		Bispeb- jerg	Brøns- høj	Fal- koner	Inner City	Nørre- bro	Øster- bro	Slots	Sundby- øster	Sundby- vester	Tårnby	Valby	Vester- bro	Total Votes	%	Con.	Com.	Tot.
Social Democrats	A	6,251	11,540	7,134	6,562	8,061	10,634	6,995	7,339	8,223	9,544	7,432	7,038	96,753	22.32%	4	0	4
Red–Green Alliance	Ø	6,157	7,170	3,985	5,495	12,239	6,443	3,877	5,386	5,726	2,603	4,646	7,413	71,140	16.41%	3	0	3
Danish People's Party	O	3,363	6,523	2,720	1,944	2,502	3,850	3,524	4,432	4,400	9,421	4,091	2,805	49,575	11.44%	2	0	2
The Alternative	Å	3,381	3,921	3,500	4,510	8,262	5,124	2,724	3,562	4,010	1,226	2,612	5,643	48,475	11.18%	2	0	2
Venstre	V	2,037	4,428	4,129	3,852	2,710	5,339	4,161	3,275	3,830	5,448	2,886	2,626	44,721	10.32%	2	0	2
Danish Social Liberal Party	B	2,205	3,369	4,140	4,044	5,065	5,082	3,049	2,691	3,340	1,413	2,346	3,834	40,578	9.36%	1	0	1
Liberal Alliance	I	1,829	3,130	3,584	4,140	2,895	5,115	3,349	2,683	3,540	2,450	2,323	2,897	37,935	8.75%	1	1	2
Socialist People's Party	F	1,909	3,509	2,015	2,085	3,471	2,921	1,772	2,156	2,318	1,483	2,031	2,590	28,260	6.52%	1	0	1
Conservative People's Party	C	580	1,240	1,970	1,260	706	1,541	1,861	755	886	1,210	769	693	13,471	3.11%	0	0	0
Christian Democrats	K	169	235	85	71	133	185	116	144	138	101	139	83	1,599	0.37%	0	0	0
Kashif Ahmad (Independent)		64	81	48	32	100	43	46	53	56	34	74	77	708	0.16%	0	0	0
Tom Gillesberg (Independent)		13	15	11	16	24	14	8	13	17	4	10	4	149	0.03%	0	0	0
John Erik Wagner (Independent)		5	8	3	6	7	3	2	24	13	5	3	3	82	0.02%	0	0	0
Jan Elkjær (Independent)		3	0	0	2	3	0	1	0	1	0	2	2	14	0.00%	0	0	0
Valid votes		27,966	45,169	33,324	34,019	46,178	46,294	31,485	32,513	36,498	34,942	29,364	35,708	433,460	100.00%	16	1	17
Blank votes		314	434	254	221	366	312	260	327	327	242	297	282	3,636	0.83%			
Rejected votes – other		107	138	97	125	170	142	92	136	155	111	120	105	1,498	0.34%			
Total polled		28,387	45,741	33,675	34,365	46,714	46,748	31,837	32,976	36,980	35,295	29,781	36,095	438,594	84.61%			
Registered electors		36,085	54,683	37,779	40,705	55,396	53,634	36,781	39,746	44,476	40,830	35,926	42,332	518,373				
Turnout		78.67%	83.65%	89.14%	84.42%	84.33%	87.16%	86.56%	82.97%	83.15%	86.44%	82.90%	85.27%	84.61%				

Votes per municipality:

Party		Votes per municipality				Total Votes
Party		Copen- hagen	Dragør	Freder- iksberg	Tårnby	Total Votes
Social Democrats	A	73,080	1,983	14,129	7,561	96,753
Red–Green Alliance	Ø	60,675	438	7,862	2,165	71,140
Danish People's Party	O	33,910	1,941	6,244	7,480	49,575
The Alternative	Å	41,025	344	6,224	882	48,475
Venstre	V	30,983	1,972	8,290	3,476	44,721
Danish Social Liberal Party	B	31,976	468	7,189	945	40,578
Liberal Alliance	I	28,552	1,046	6,933	1,404	37,935
Socialist People's Party	F	22,990	283	3,787	1,200	28,260
Conservative People's Party	C	8,430	528	3,831	682	13,471
Christian Democrats	K	1,297	11	201	90	1,599
Kashif Ahmad (Independent)		580	7	94	27	708
Tom Gillesberg (Independent)		126	1	19	3	149
John Erik Wagner (Independent)		72	1	5	4	82
Jan Elkjær (Independent)		13	0	1	0	14
Valid votes		333,709	9,023	64,809	25,919	433,460
Blank votes		2,880	62	514	180	3,636
Rejected votes – other		1,198	26	189	85	1,498
Total polled		337,787	9,111	65,512	26,184	438,594
Registered electors		402,983	10,116	74,560	30,714	518,373
Turnout		83.82%	90.07%	87.86%	85.25%	84.61%

The following candidates were elected:

- Constituency seats - Yildiz Akdogan (A), 7,037 votes; Simon Emil Ammitzbøll-Bille (I), 21,794 votes; Ida Auken (B), 18,600 votes; Pelle Dragsted (Ø), 3,827 votes; Pia Olsen Dyhr (F), 14,487 votes; Uffe Elbæk (Å), 37,478 votes; Martin Henriksen (O), 7,625 votes; Peter Hummelgaard Thomsen (A), 8,294 votes; Jan E. Jørgensen (V), 8,500 votes; Carolina Magdalene Maier (Å), 2,143 votes; Søren Pind (V), 20,903 votes; Mette Reissmann (A), 4,880 votes; Johanne Schmidt-Nielsen (Ø), 44,405 votes; Peter Skaarup (O), 28,555 votes; Finn Sørensen (Ø), 2,862 votes; and Helle Thorning-Schmidt (A), 68,809 votes.
- Compensatory seats - Laura Lindahl (I), 8,310 votes.

==== 2011 ====
Results of the 2011 general election held on 15 September 2011:

Party		Votes per nomination district												Total Votes	%	Seats		
Party		Bispeb- jerg (Note: Bispebjerg nomination district was known as Utterslev nomination district prior to March 2014.)	Brøns- høj	Fal- koner	Inner City	Nørre- bro	Øster- bro	Slots	Sundby- øster	Sundby- vester	Tårnby	Valby	Vester- bro	Total Votes	%	Con.	Com.	Tot.
Social Democrats	A	5,967	10,305	5,198	4,541	7,249	8,153	5,599	6,341	6,740	7,913	6,645	6,054	80,705	18.94%	3	0	3
Danish Social Liberal Party	B	3,945	6,125	6,792	6,937	8,952	8,882	5,442	4,795	5,708	2,955	4,012	6,719	71,264	16.72%	3	0	3
Red–Green Alliance	Ø	5,630	6,790	4,139	6,100	12,382	6,744	3,758	5,088	5,540	2,485	4,235	7,940	70,831	16.62%	3	0	3
Venstre	V	3,095	6,647	5,889	5,174	3,748	7,645	5,737	4,900	5,280	8,698	4,338	3,763	64,914	15.23%	2	1	3
Socialist People's Party	F	3,891	6,112	3,462	3,824	6,821	5,206	3,390	4,130	4,291	3,119	3,744	4,880	52,870	12.40%	2	1	3
Danish People's Party	O	2,675	5,060	2,022	1,397	2,112	2,764	2,513	3,047	3,098	6,119	2,964	2,116	35,887	8.42%	1	1	2
Liberal Alliance	I	1,290	2,051	2,397	2,719	2,003	3,235	2,161	1,704	2,276	1,680	1,419	1,947	24,882	5.84%	1	0	1
Conservative People's Party	C	1,110	2,119	3,308	2,193	1,404	2,876	2,977	1,153	1,578	1,980	1,278	1,286	23,262	5.46%	0	1	1
Christian Democrats	K	107	176	80	56	103	130	95	90	77	98	85	88	1,185	0.28%	0	0	0
Klaus Trier Tuxen (Independent)		13	19	3	20	22	16	10	11	17	6	8	16	161	0.04%	0	0	0
Tom Gillesberg (Independent)		12	12	5	10	22	14	2	13	9	7	9	8	123	0.03%	0	0	0
Mads Vestergaard (Independent)		6	4	2	4	5	3	4	10	5	2	5	4	54	0.01%	0	0	0
John Erik Wagner (Independent)		1	3	2	0	3	2	0	14	7	8	0	3	43	0.01%	0	0	0
Per Zimmermann (Independent)		1	1	0	0	1	2	0	2	0	2	1	4	14	0.00%	0	0	0
Morten Versner (Independent)		2	1	0	0	4	0	1	0	1	0	0	1	10	0.00%	0	0	0
Valid votes		27,745	45,425	33,299	32,975	44,831	45,672	31,689	31,298	34,627	35,072	28,743	34,829	426,205	100.00%	15	4	19
Blank votes		196	291	160	154	268	252	186	213	225	209	217	217	2,588	0.60%			
Rejected votes – other		202	194	101	116	279	170	127	126	153	98	125	179	1,870	0.43%			
Total polled		28,143	45,910	33,560	33,245	45,378	46,094	32,002	31,637	35,005	35,379	29,085	35,225	430,663	86.42%			
Registered electors		34,581	53,394	36,937	39,278	52,623	51,793	36,509	37,224	41,247	40,043	34,084	40,637	498,350				
Turnout		81.38%	85.98%	90.86%	84.64%	86.23%	89.00%	87.66%	84.99%	84.87%	88.35%	85.33%	86.68%	86.42%				

Votes per municipality:

Party		Votes per municipality				Total Votes
Party		Copen- hagen	Dragør	Freder- iksberg	Tårnby	Total Votes
Social Democrats	A	61,995	1,404	10,797	6,509	80,705
Danish Social Liberal Party	B	56,075	923	12,234	2,032	71,264
Red–Green Alliance	Ø	60,449	441	7,897	2,044	70,831
Venstre	V	44,590	2,890	11,626	5,808	64,914
Socialist People's Party	F	42,899	571	6,852	2,548	52,870
Danish People's Party	O	25,233	1,267	4,535	4,852	35,887
Liberal Alliance	I	18,644	656	4,558	1,024	24,882
Conservative People's Party	C	14,997	884	6,285	1,096	23,262
Christian Democrats	K	912	13	175	85	1,185
Klaus Trier Tuxen (Independent)		142	1	13	5	161
Tom Gillesberg (Independent)		109	0	7	7	123
Mads Vestergaard (Independent)		46	1	6	1	54
John Erik Wagner (Independent)		33	0	2	8	43
Per Zimmermann (Independent)		12	0	0	2	14
Morten Versner (Independent)		9	0	1	0	10
Valid votes		326,145	9,051	64,988	26,021	426,205
Blank votes		2,033	25	346	184	2,588
Rejected votes – other		1,544	9	228	89	1,870
Total polled		329,722	9,085	65,562	26,294	430,663
Registered electors		384,861	9,968	73,446	30,075	498,350
Turnout		85.67%	91.14%	89.27%	87.43%	86.42%

The following candidates were elected:

- Constituency seats - Simon Emil Ammitzbøll-Bille (I), 16,426 votes; Ida Auken (F), 14,656 votes; Uffe Elbæk (B), 6,703 votes; Martin Geertsen (V), 5,589 votes; Karen Hækkerup (A), 7,355 votes; Lone Loklindt (B), 3,441 votes; Rosa Lund (Ø), 3,370 votes; Søren Pind (V), 42,072 votes; Mette Reissmann (A), 5,128 votes; Manu Sareen (B), 41,202 votes; Johanne Schmidt-Nielsen (Ø), 50,350 votes; Peter Skaarup (O), 24,069 votes; Finn Sørensen (Ø), 2,310 votes; Villy Søvndal (F), 20,814 votes; and Helle Thorning-Schmidt (A), 54,346 votes.
- Compensatory seats - Özlem Cekic (F), 8,685 votes; Martin Henriksen (O), 3,856 votes; Jan E. Jørgensen (V), 5,165 votes; and Per Stig Møller (C), 12,756 votes.

==== 2007 ====
Results of the 2007 general election held on 13 November 2007:

Party		Votes per nomination district												Total Votes	%	Seats		
Party		Bispeb- jerg	Brøns- høj	Fal- koner	Inner City	Nørre- bro	Øster- bro	Slots	Sundby- øster	Sundby- vester	Tårnby	Valby	Vester- bro	Total Votes	%	Con.	Com.	Tot.
Social Democrats	A	7,207	12,213	6,471	5,912	9,420	10,408	6,635	7,859	7,889	9,102	7,437	7,350	97,903	24.23%	4	0	4
Socialist People's Party	F	6,133	9,194	5,435	6,601	11,339	8,855	5,254	6,605	6,776	4,381	5,832	8,438	84,843	21.00%	4	0	4
Venstre	V	2,938	6,040	4,918	4,487	3,549	6,416	4,570	4,137	4,245	7,489	3,568	2,954	55,311	13.69%	2	0	2
Danish People's Party	O	3,363	6,159	2,454	1,716	2,906	3,466	3,019	3,720	3,583	6,401	3,582	2,537	42,906	10.62%	2	0	2
Conservative People's Party	C	2,047	3,865	5,357	3,707	2,683	5,114	4,893	2,346	2,753	3,650	2,311	2,085	40,811	10.10%	1	1	2
Danish Social Liberal Party	B	2,020	3,188	3,452	3,620	4,570	4,645	2,691	2,350	2,721	1,424	1,945	3,232	35,858	8.88%	1	0	1
Unity List	Ø	1,939	2,495	1,649	2,805	5,106	2,666	1,410	1,604	1,939	553	1,514	3,283	26,963	6.67%	1	0	1
New Alliance	Y	886	1,633	1,722	1,847	1,736	2,158	1,449	1,183	1,356	997	988	1,268	17,223	4.26%	0	1	1
Christian Democrats	K	196	269	130	116	166	214	175	187	155	134	119	153	2,014	0.50%	0	0	0
Tom Gillesberg (Independent)		6	4	7	5	13	15	3	3	8	3	0	1	68	0.02%	0	0	0
John Erik Wagner (Independent)		0	1	4	4	2	2	0	17	4	4	3	1	42	0.01%	0	0	0
Vibeke Baden Laursen (Independent)		1	1	1	1	2	1	2	0	1	3	3	1	17	0.00%	0	0	0
Nicolai Krogh Mittet (Independent)		1	2	1	1	0	2	2	1	0	1	4	0	15	0.00%	0	0	0
Amir Becirovic (Independent)		1	1	1	0	4	0	1	2	0	1	1	1	13	0.00%	0	0	0
Valid votes		26,738	45,065	31,602	30,822	41,496	43,962	30,104	30,014	31,430	34,143	27,307	31,304	403,987	100.00%	15	2	17
Blank votes		116	179	121	99	192	154	119	115	132	141	147	124	1,639	0.40%			
Rejected votes – other		82	118	67	60	198	98	101	105	95	89	108	103	1,224	0.30%			
Total polled		26,936	45,362	31,790	30,981	41,886	44,214	30,324	30,234	31,657	34,373	27,562	31,531	406,850	84.78%			
Registered electors		33,772	53,338	35,733	37,037	50,012	50,809	35,025	36,279	38,343	39,168	33,149	37,252	479,917				
Turnout		79.76%	85.05%	88.97%	83.65%	83.75%	87.02%	86.58%	83.34%	82.56%	87.76%	83.15%	84.64%	84.78%				

Votes per municipality:

Party		Votes per municipality				Total Votes
Party		Copen- hagen	Dragør	Freder- iksberg	Tårnby	Total Votes
Social Democrats	A	75,695	1,661	13,106	7,441	97,903
Socialist People's Party	F	69,773	833	10,689	3,548	84,843
Venstre	V	38,334	2,416	9,488	5,073	55,311
Danish People's Party	O	31,032	1,292	5,473	5,109	42,906
Conservative People's Party	C	26,911	1,561	10,250	2,089	40,811
Danish Social Liberal Party	B	28,291	491	6,143	933	35,858
Unity List	Ø	23,351	124	3,059	429	26,963
New Alliance	Y	13,055	327	3,171	670	17,223
Christian Democrats	K	1,575	29	305	105	2,014
Tom Gillesberg (Independent)		55	0	10	3	68
John Erik Wagner (Independent)		34	0	4	4	42
Vibeke Baden Laursen (Independent)		11	1	3	2	17
Nicolai Krogh Mittet (Independent)		11	1	3	0	15
Amir Becirovic (Independent)		10	0	2	1	13
Valid votes		308,138	8,736	61,706	25,407	403,987
Blank votes		1,258	30	240	111	1,639
Rejected votes – other		967	11	168	78	1,224
Total polled		310,363	8,777	62,114	25,596	406,850
Registered electors		369,991	9,603	70,758	29,565	479,917
Turnout		83.88%	91.40%	87.78%	86.58%	84.78%

The following candidates were elected:

- Constituency seats - Yildiz Akdogan (A), 2,226 votes; Christine Antorini (A), 6,181 votes; Ida Auken (F), 25,737 votes; Özlem Cekic (F), 12,377 votes; Lone Dybkjær (B), 13,684 votes; Karen Hækkerup (A), 5,517 votes; Martin Henriksen (O), 2,568 votes; Anne Grete Holmsgaard (F), 14,369 votes; Rikke Hvilshøj (V), 11,277 votes; Per Stig Møller (C), 24,984 votes; Søren Pind (V), 25,945 votes; Kamal Qureshi (F), 18,125 votes; Johanne Schmidt-Nielsen (Ø), 11,066 votes; Peter Skaarup (O), 33,434 votes; and Helle Thorning-Schmidt (A), 74,121 votes.
- Compensatory seats - Naser Khader (Y), 13,780 votes; and Helle Sjelle (C), 6,033 votes.
