= Helle Bonnesen =

Danish politician (born 1963)

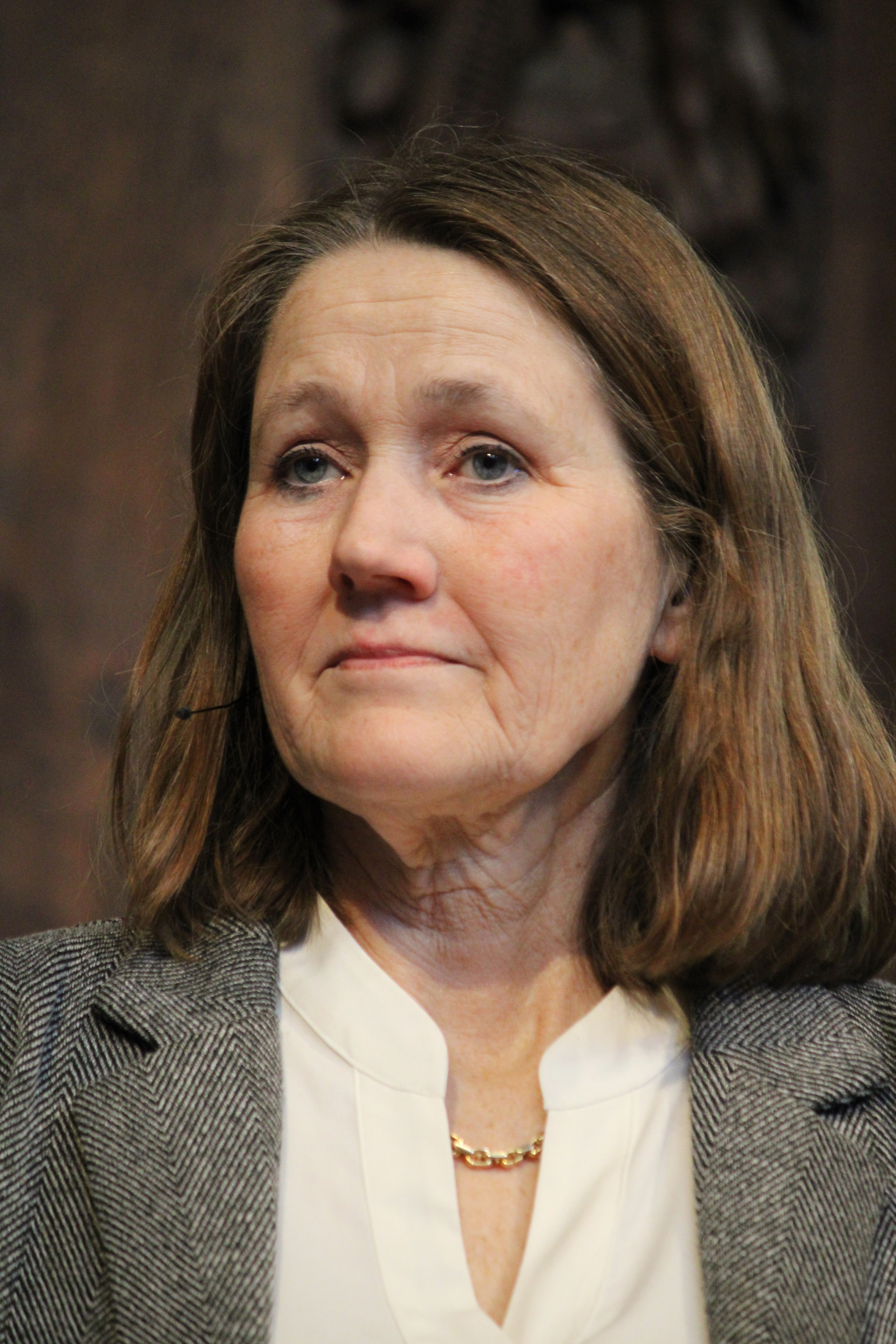
- Bonnesen in 2026

Member of the Folketing
- Incumbent
- Assumed office 1 November 2022
- Constituency: Copenhagen

Personal details
- Born: February 10, 1963 (age 63)
- Party: Conservative People's Party
- Website: hellebonnesen.dk

Helle Bonnesen (born 10 February 1963) is a Danish politician serving as Member of the Folketing for the Conservative People's Party since 2022.

== Career ==
Bonnesen was elected to the Folketing at the 2022 Danish general election with 2,783 personal votes.
