= Magnus Georg Jensen =

Danish politician (born 1995)

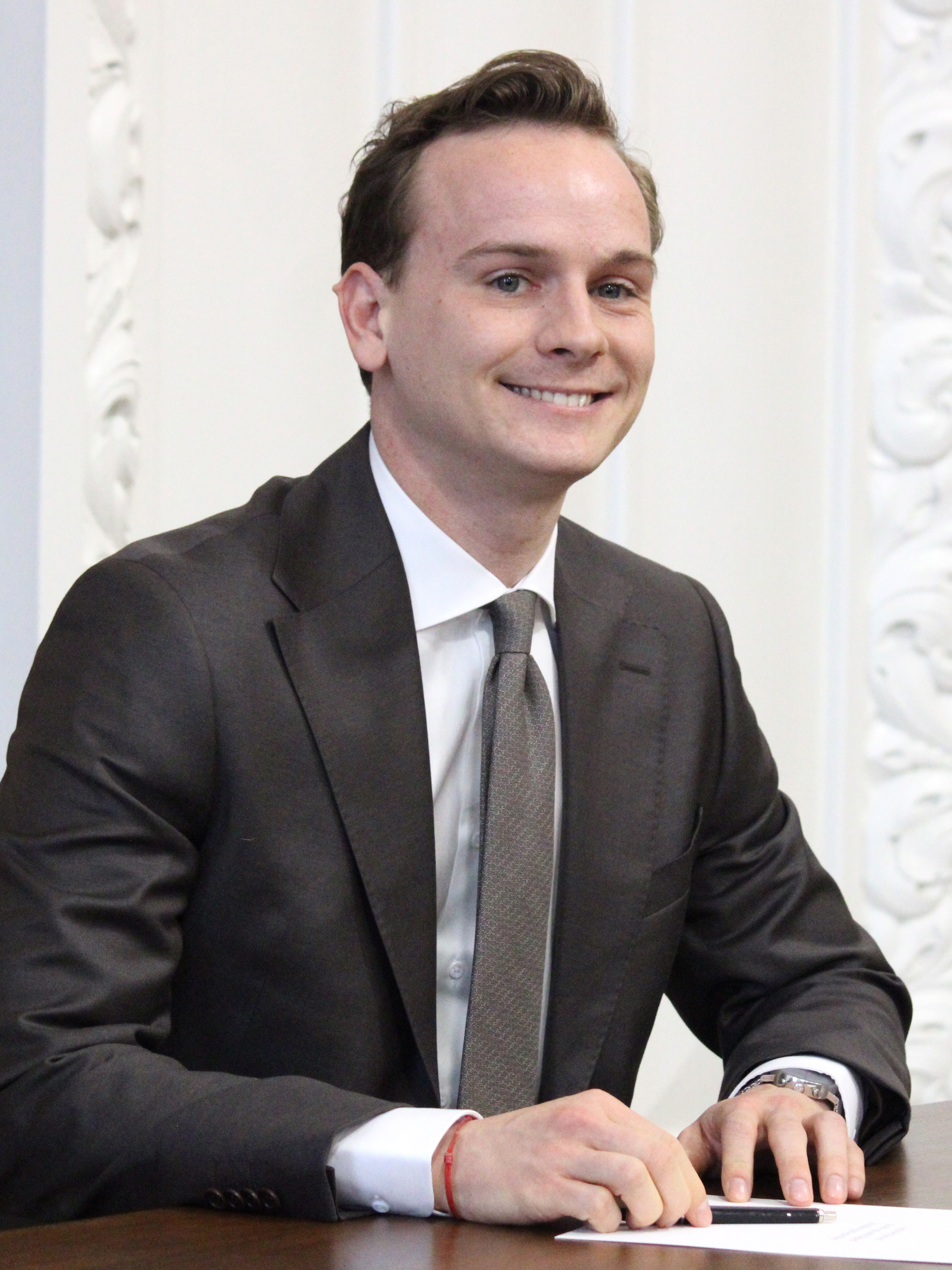
- Jensen in 2026

Member of the Folketing
- Incumbent
- Assumed office 24 March 2026
- Constituency: Copenhagen

Personal details
- Born: 13 November 1995 (age 30)
- Party: Danish Social Liberal Party

Magnus Georg Jensen (born 13 November 1995) is a Danish politician serving as a member of the Folketing since 2026. He previously worked as a consultant.

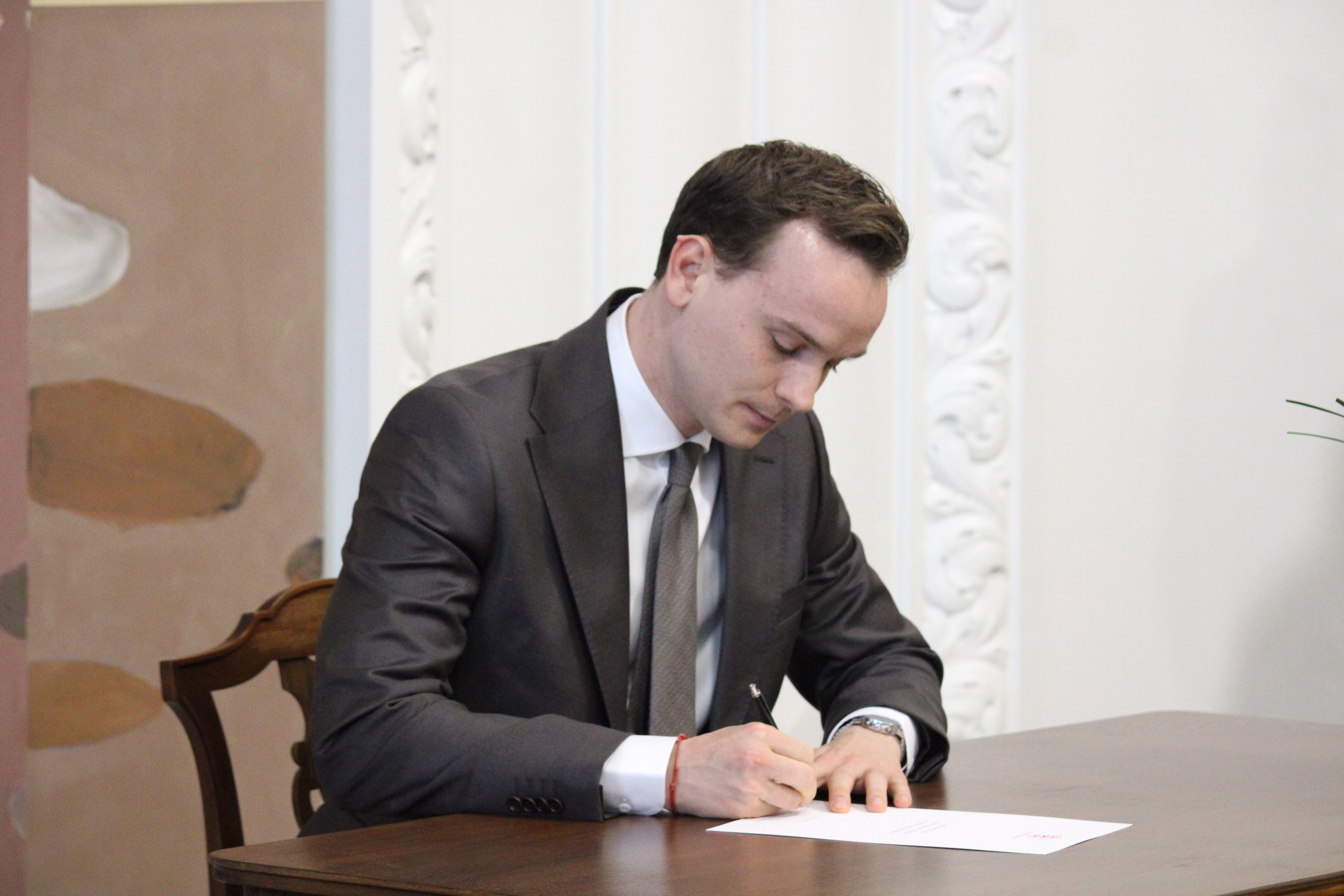
Jensen signing a pledge to uphold the Danish Constitution at Christiansborg, 14 April 2026
