= Ellen Emilie =

Danish politician (born 2001)

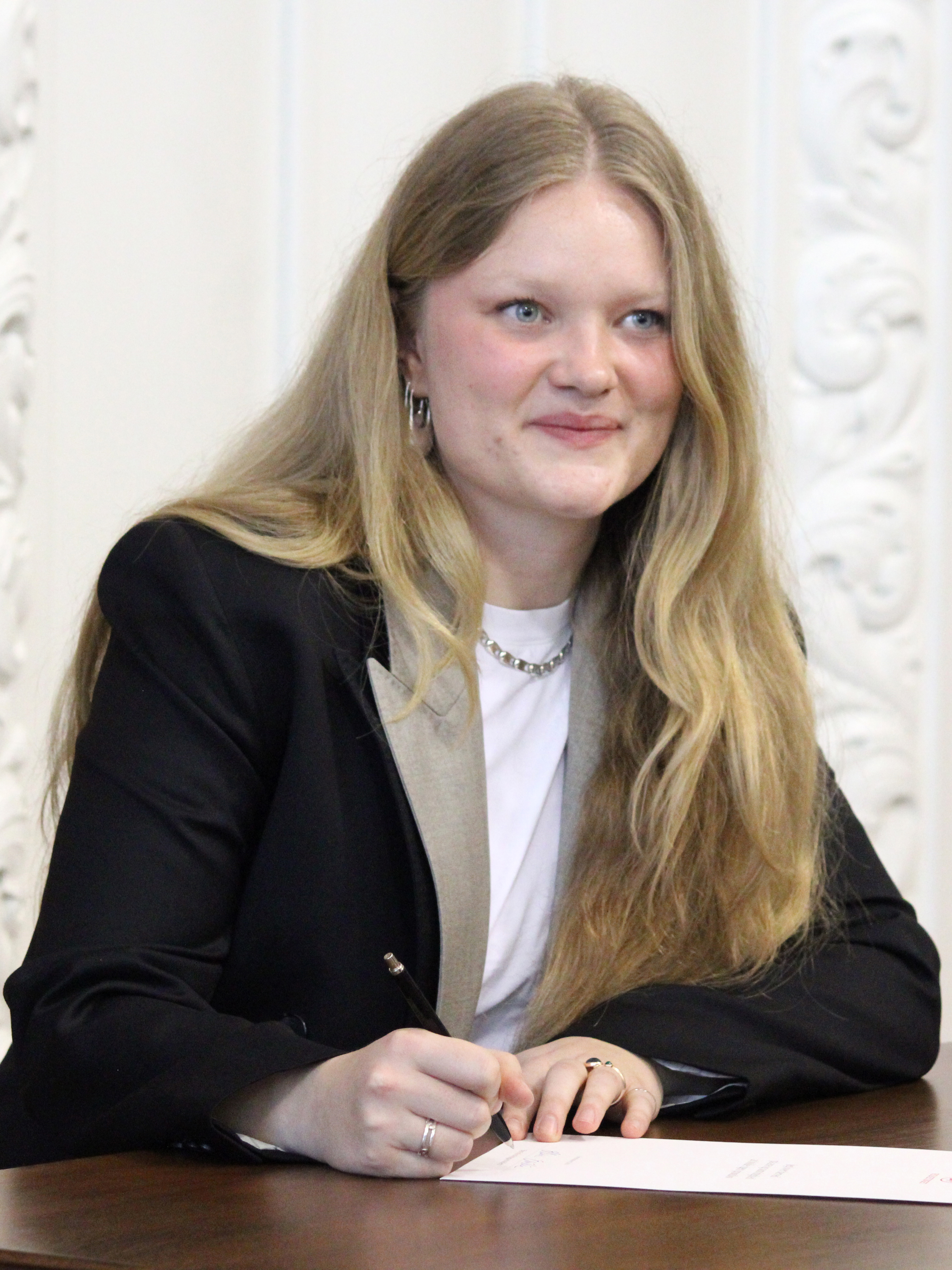
- Emilie in 2026

Member of the Folketing
- Incumbent
- Assumed office 24 March 2026
- Constituency: Copenhagen

Personal details
- Born: 9 November 2001 (age 24)
- Party: Moderates

Ellen Emilie Mindegaard-Müllertz (born 9 November 2001) is a Danish politician who was elected member of the Folketing in 2026. From 2023 to 2025, she served as chairwoman of Unge Moderater. In the 2025 Copenhagen city council election, she was the lead candidate of the Moderates.

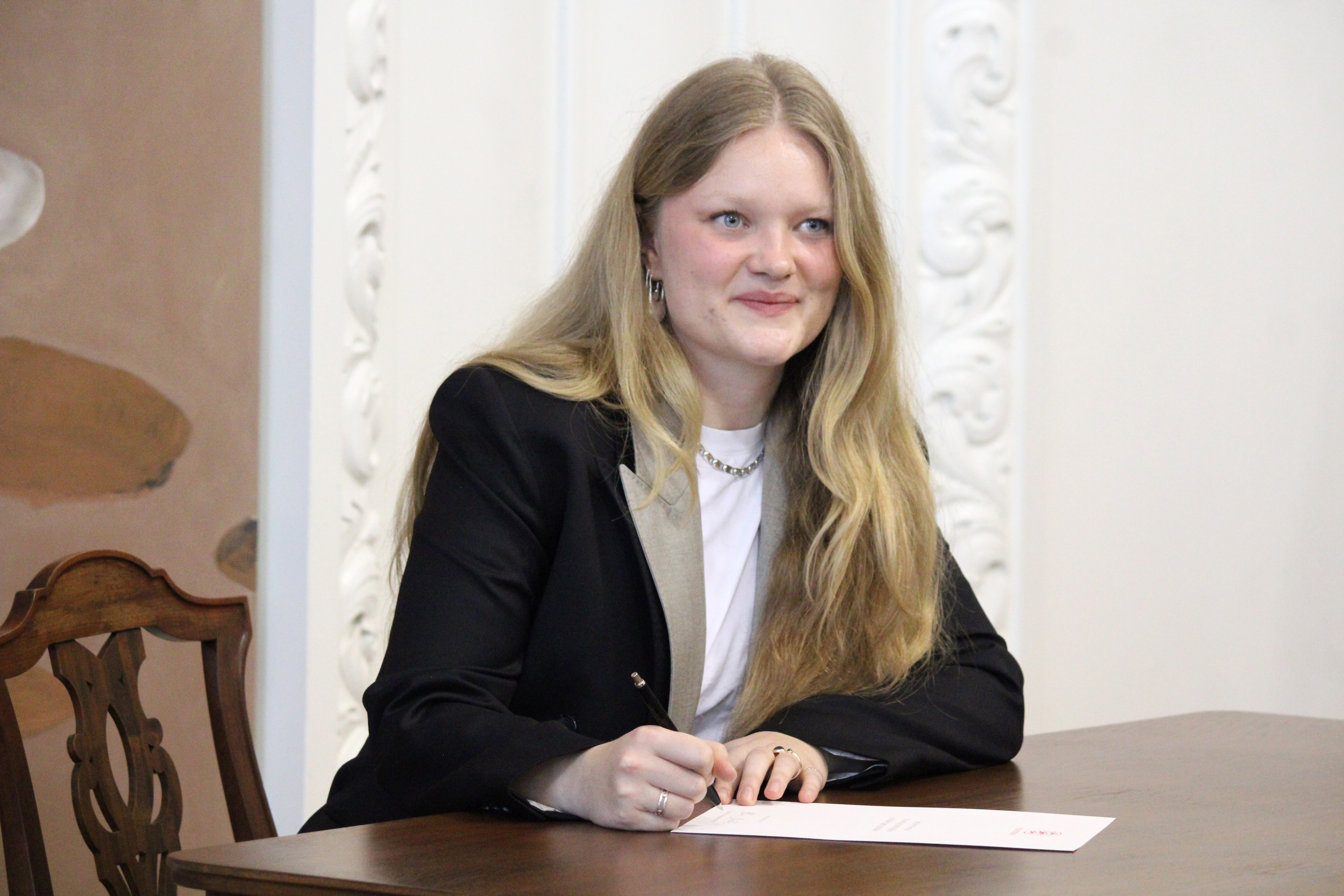
Emilie signing a pledge to uphold the Danish Constitution at Christiansborg, 14 April 2026
