= Christina Olumeko =

Danish politician (born 1996)

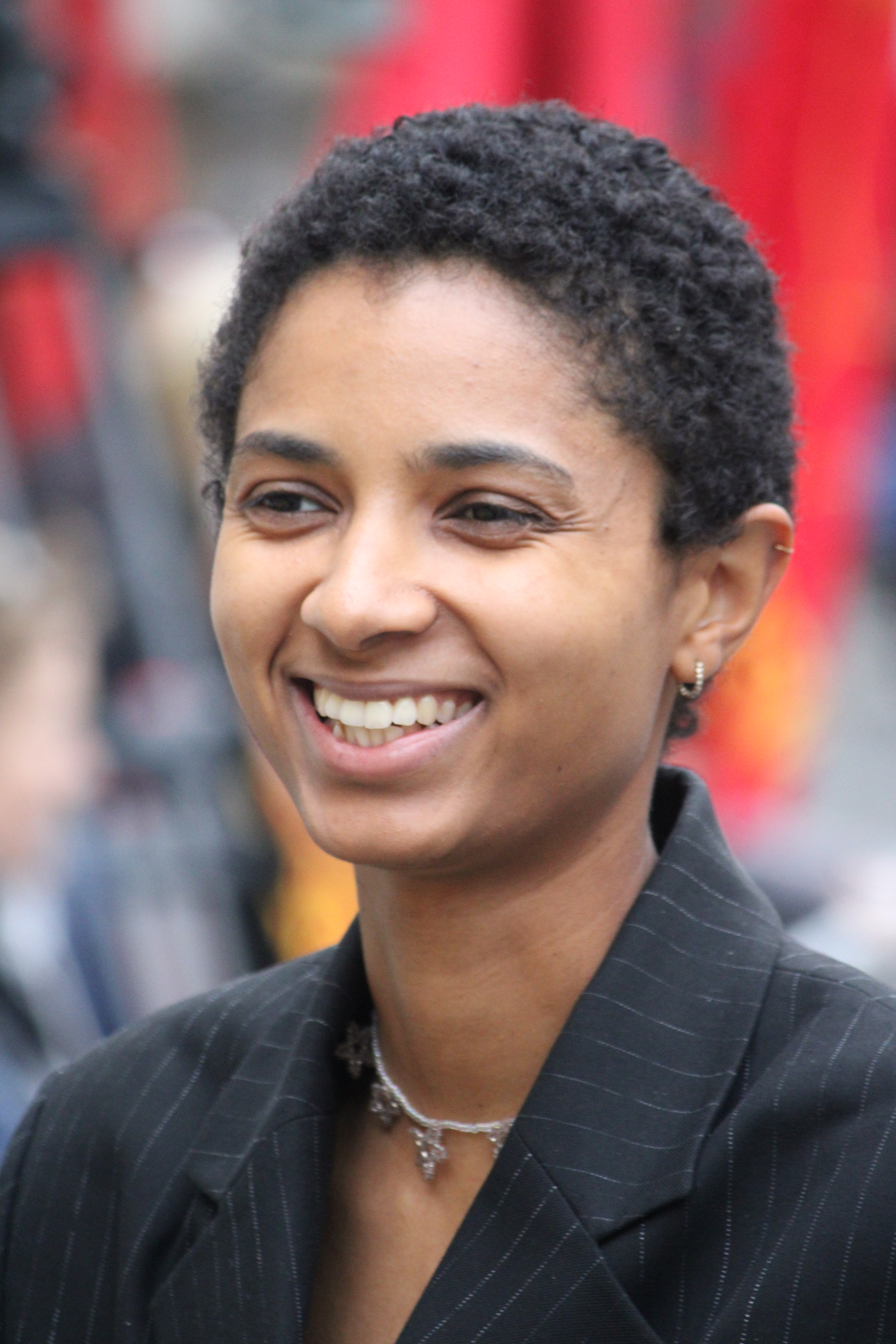
- Olumeko in 2025

Member of the Folketing
- Incumbent
- Assumed office 1 November 2022
- Constituency: Copenhagen

Personal details
- Born: 26 November 1996 (age 29)
- Party: The Alternative
- Education: University of Copenhagen
- Website: alleos.alternativet.dk/user/17832

Christina Sade Olumeko (born 26 November 1996) is a Danish politician and member of the Folketing, the national legislature. A member of The Alternative party, she has represented Copenhagen since November 2022.

Olumeko was born on 26 November 1996. Her mother is French and her father is Nigerian. She has a bachelor's degree in political science from the University of Copenhagen (2019). She was a student assistant, analysis consultant and financial consultant at various schools from 2018 to 2022. She was a member of Copenhagen City Council from 2021 to 2022.

Electoral history of Christina Olumeko
Election	Constituency	Party	Votes	Result
2021 local	Copenhagen Municipality	The Alternative	872	Elected
2022 general	Copenhagen	The Alternative	3,476	Elected
