= Alexander Ryle =

Danish politician

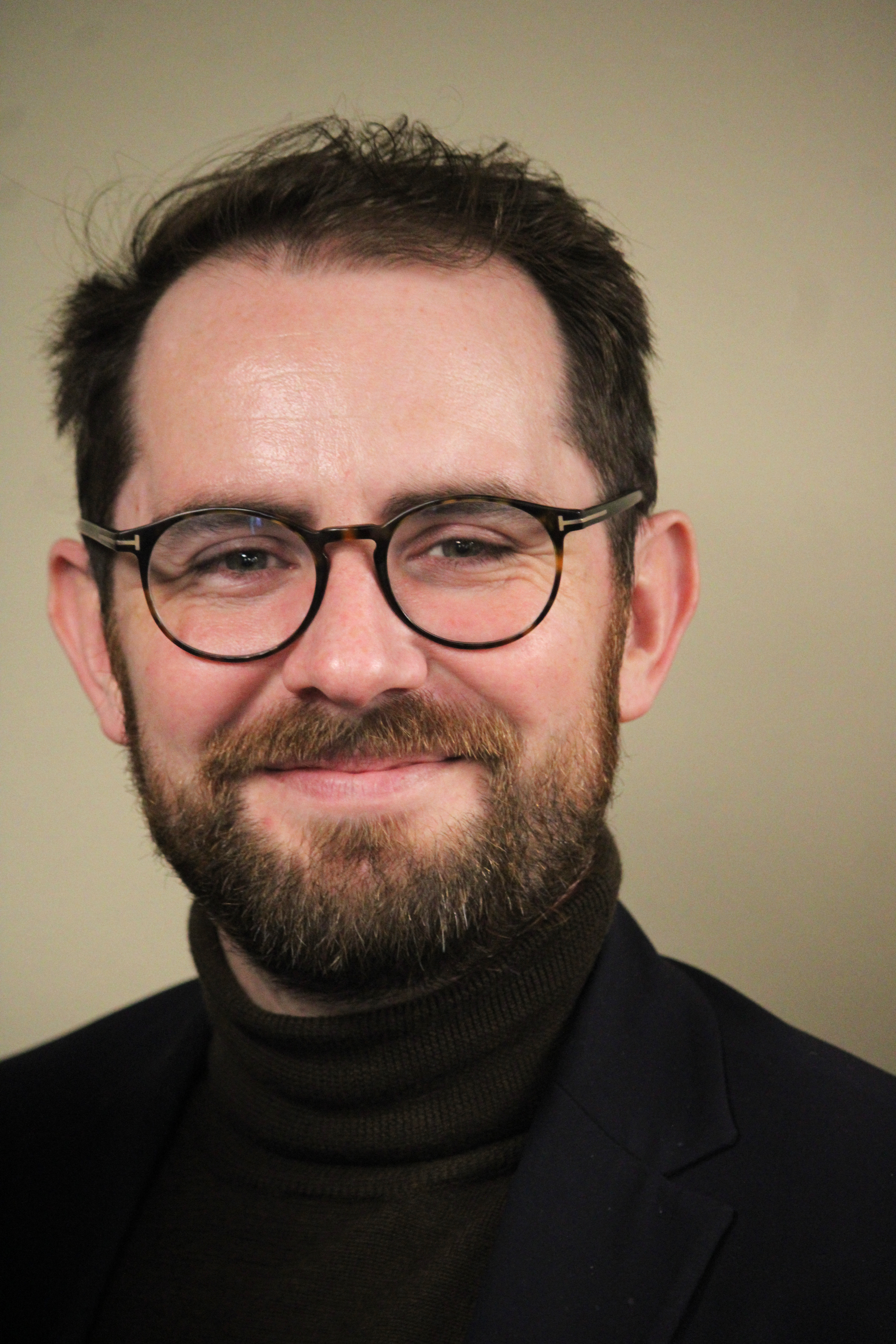
- Ryle in 2026

Member of the Folketing
- Incumbent
- Assumed office 1 November 2022
- Constituency: Copenhagen

Personal details
- Born: 17 October 1990 (age 35) Hvidovre, Denmark
- Party: Liberal Alliance

Alexander Adam Ryle (born 17 October 1990) is a Danish politician, who is a member of the Folketing for the Liberal Alliance. He was elected into the Folketing in the 2022 Danish general election.
