= Nanna Gotfredsen =

Danish lawyer and politician (born 1969)

Member of the Folketing
- Incumbent
- Assumed office 1 November 2022
- Constituency: Copenhagen

Personal details
- Born: 11 March 1969 (age 57) Haderslev, Denmark
- Party: Moderates
- Occupation: Politician, lawyer

Nanna W. Gotfredsen (born 11 March 1969) is a Danish lawyer and politician and Member of the Folketing for Copenhagen from the Moderates. Alongside sixteen other members of The Moderates, Gotfredsen was elected to the Folketing in November 2022.

== See also ==
- List of members of the Folketing, 2022–present
