= Nanna Bonde =

Danish politician (born 1993)

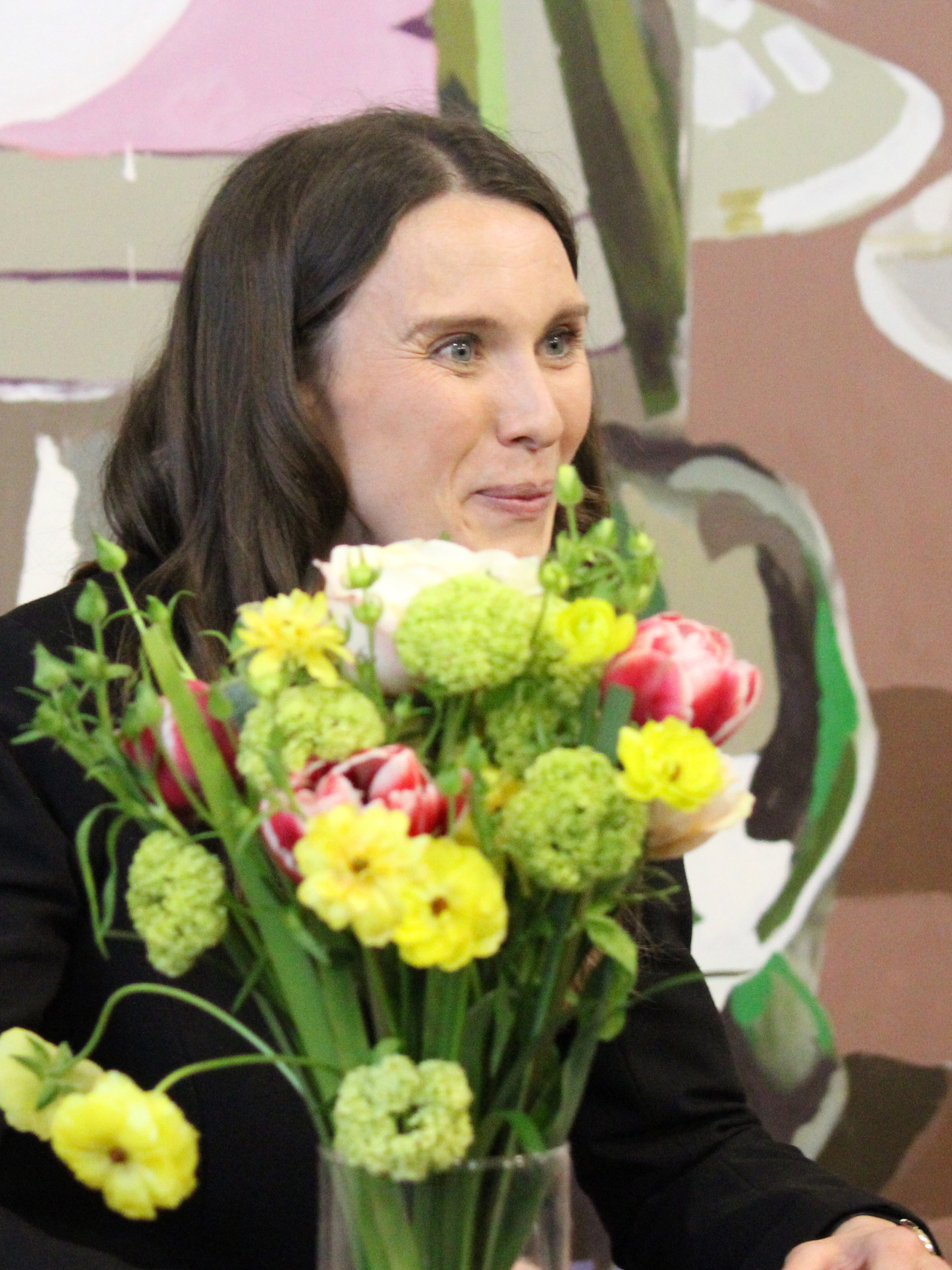
- Bonde in 2026

Member of the Folketing
- Incumbent
- Assumed office 24 March 2026
- Constituency: Copenhagen

Personal details
- Born: 18 May 1993 (age 32)
- Party: Green Left

Nanna Bonde (born 18 May 1993) is a Danish politician serving as a member of the Folketing since 2026. From 2015 to 2017, she served as chairwoman of the Popular Socialist Youth.

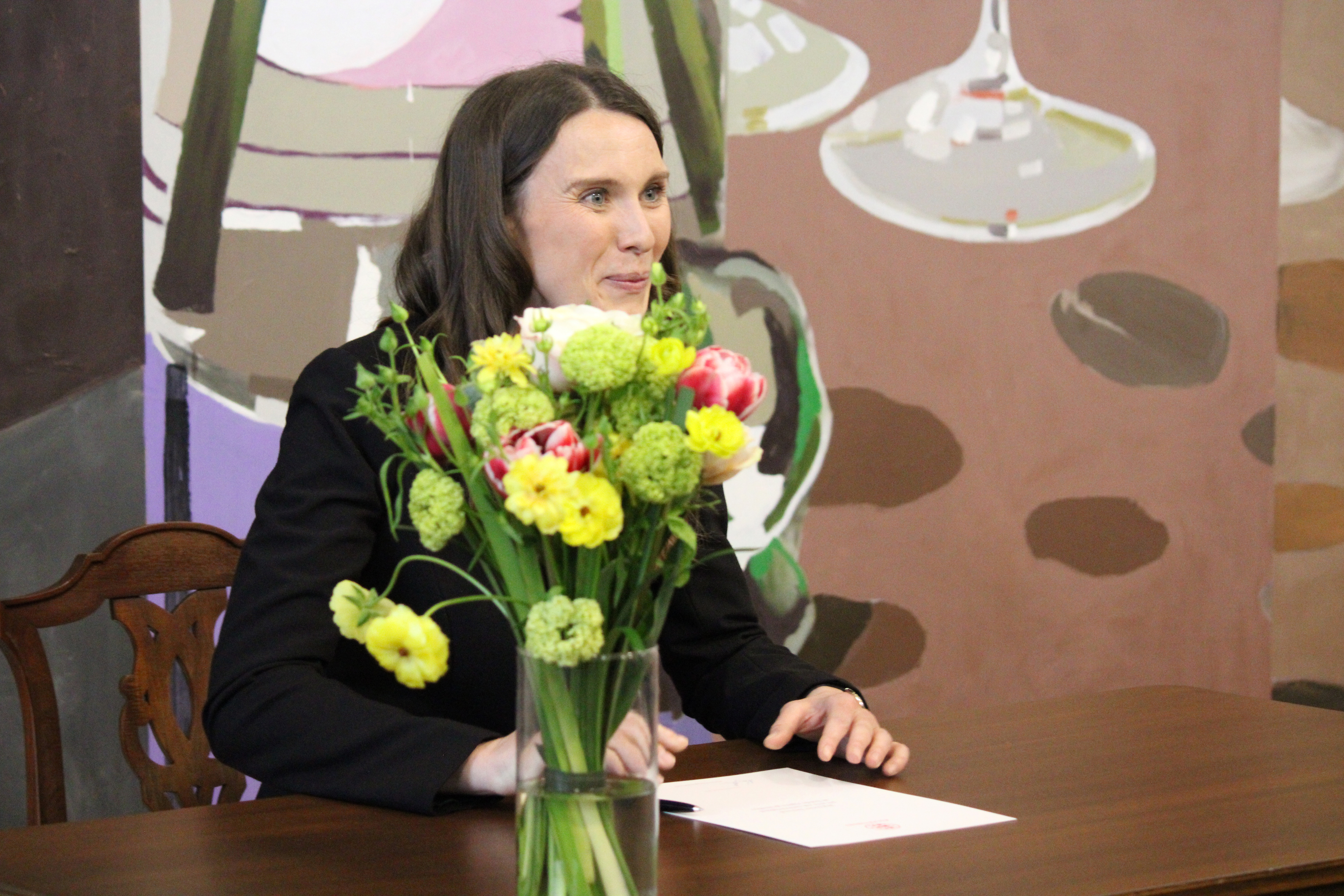
Bonde signing a pledge to uphold the Danish Constitution at Christiansborg, 14 April 2026
