= Thomas Rohden =

Danish politician (born 1996)

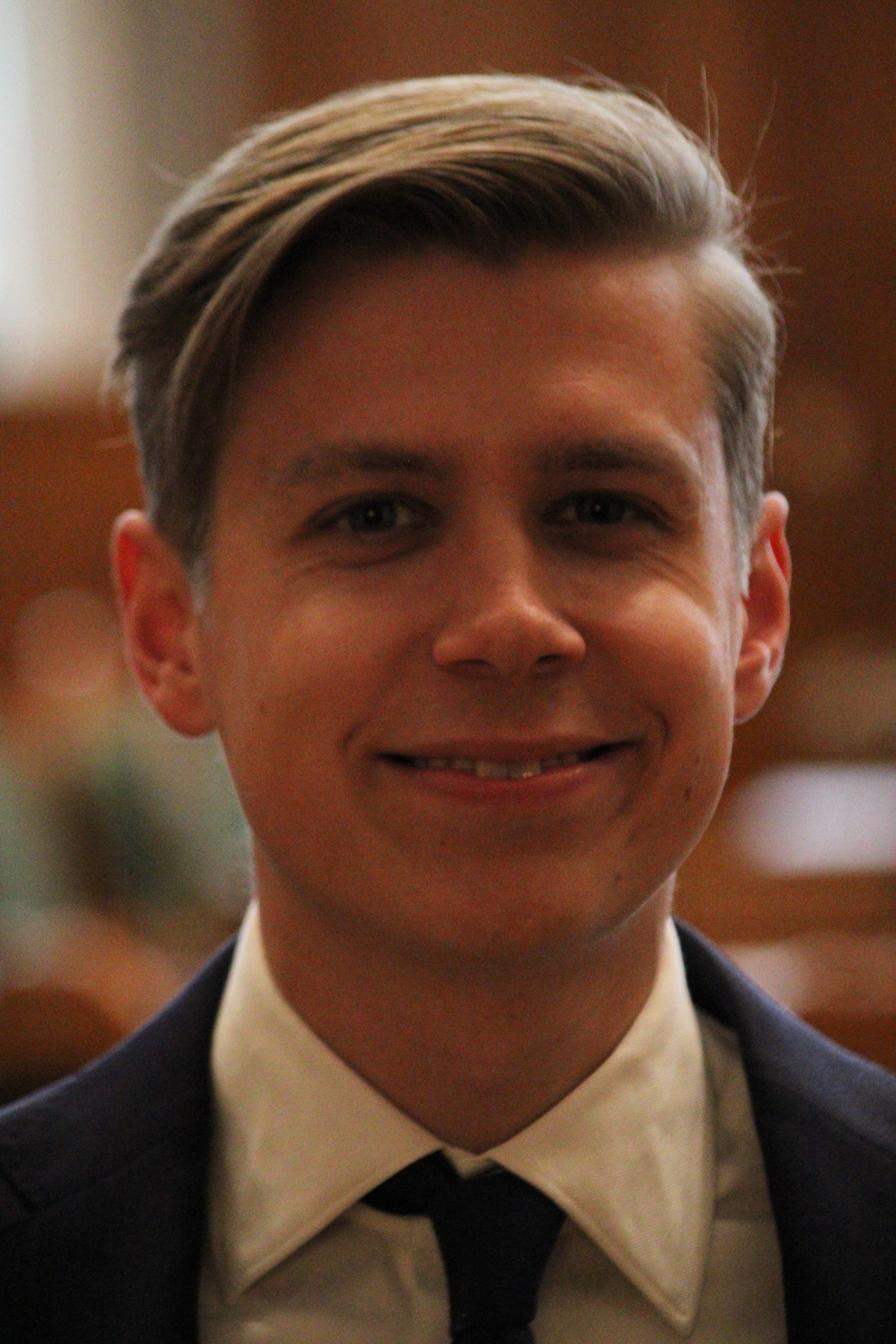
- Rohden in 2026

Member of the Folketing
- Incumbent
- Assumed office 24 March 2026
- Constituency: Copenhagen

Personal details
- Born: 31 January 1996 (age 30)
- Party: Danish Social Liberal Party

Thomas Rohden (born 31 January 1996) is a Danish politician serving as a member of the Folketing since 2026. He has served as second deputy chairman of the Regional Council of the Capital Region since 2022.

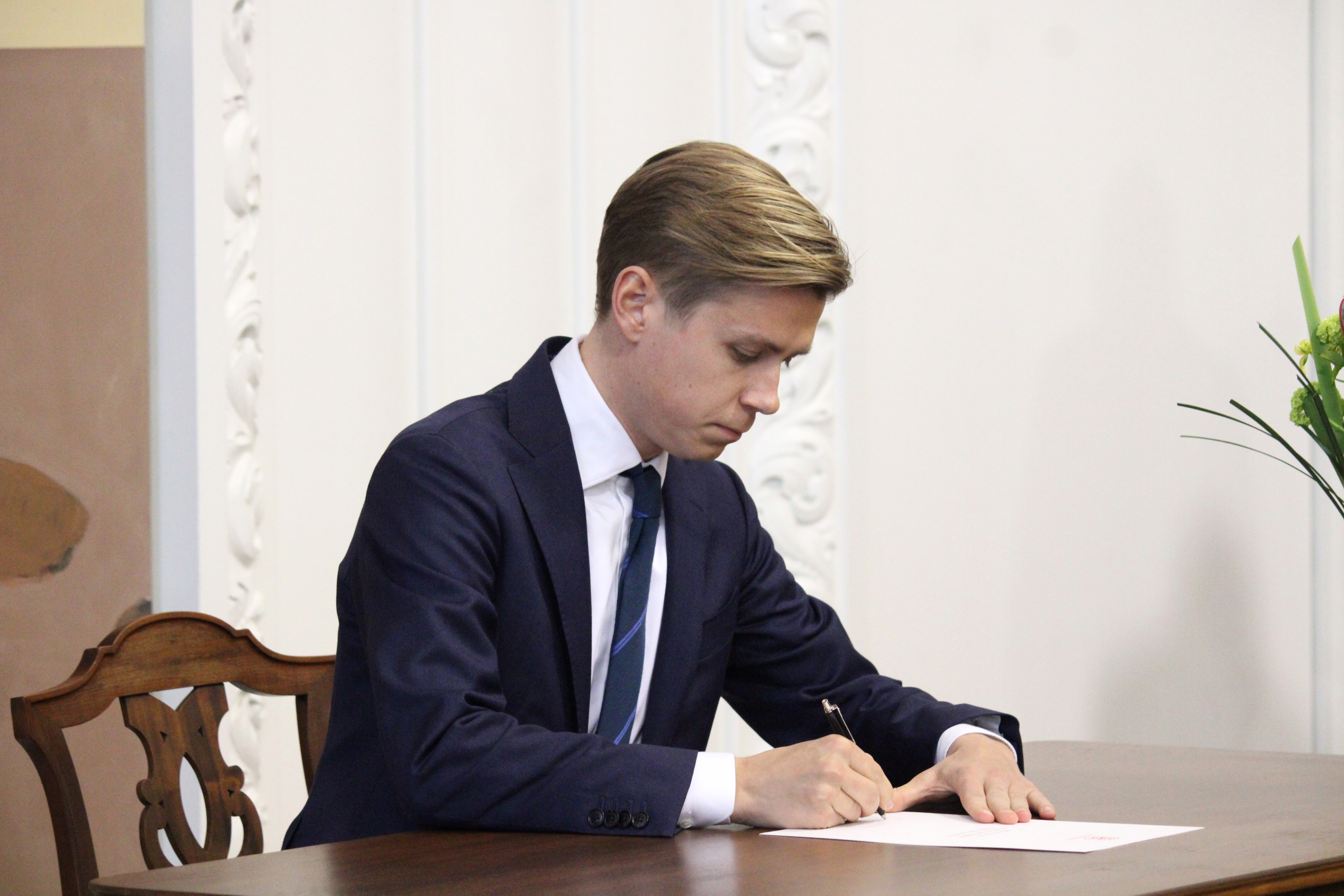
Rohden signing a pledge to uphold the Danish Constitution at Christiansborg, 14 April 2026
