= Anders Storgaard =

Danish politician (born 1994)

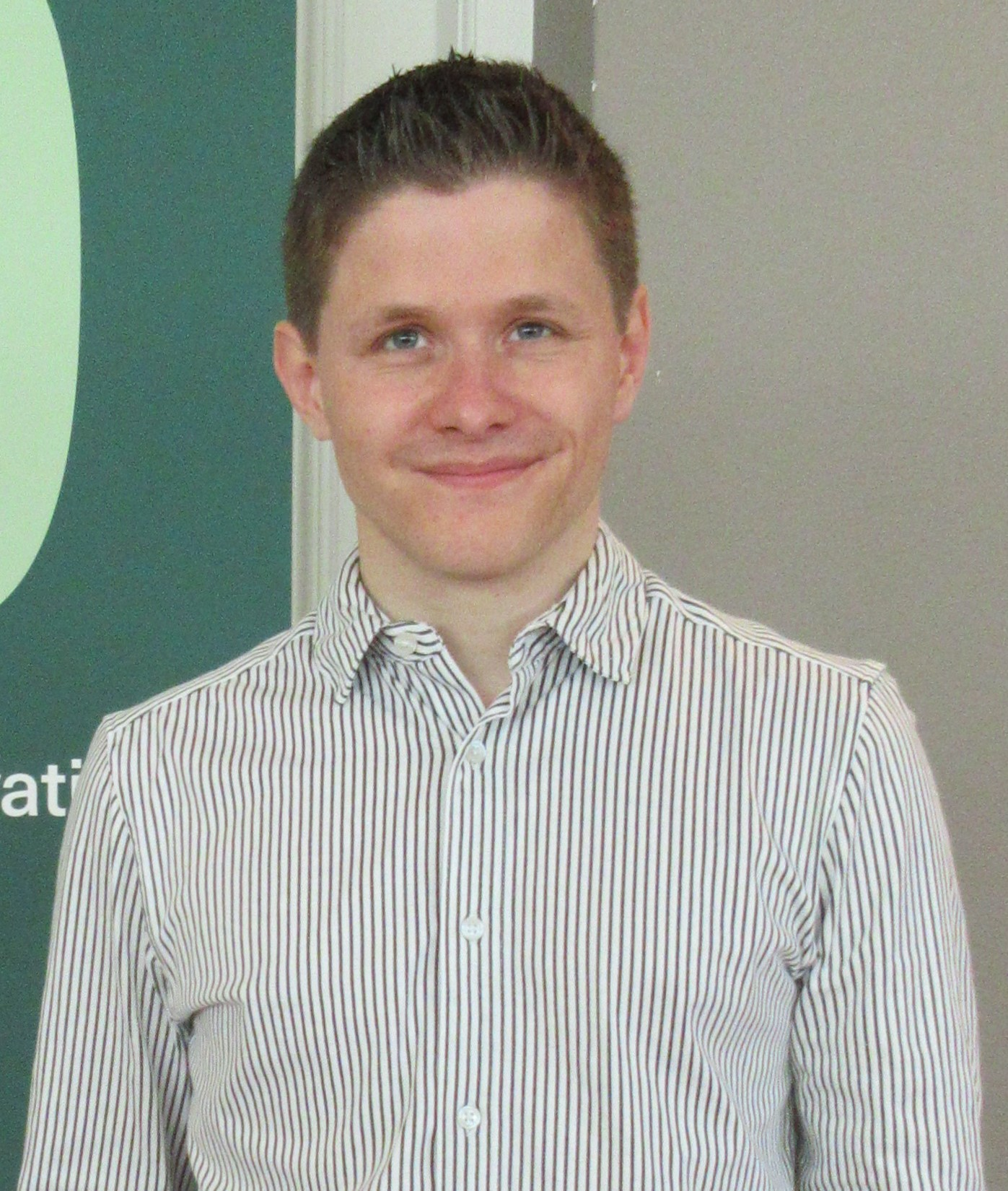
- Storgaard in 2025

Member of the Folketing
- Incumbent
- Assumed office 24 March 2026
- Constituency: Copenhagen

Personal details
- Born: 28 January 1994 (age 32)
- Party: Conservative People's Party

Anders Engelbrecht Storgaard (born 28 January 1994) is an Australian-born Danish politician from the Conservative People's Party serving as a member of the Folketing since 2026. From 2018 to 2020, he served as chairman of the Young Conservatives.

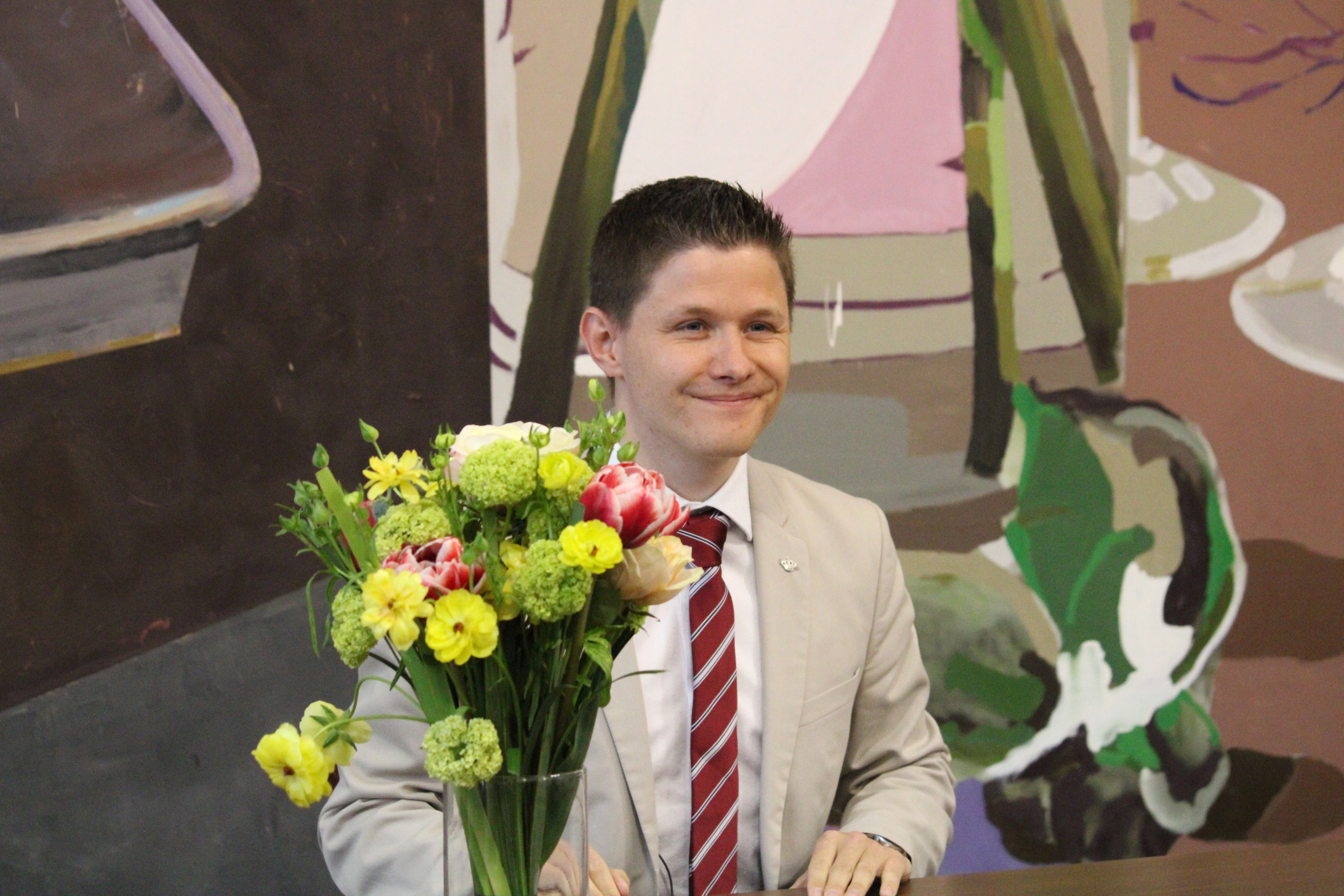
Storgaard signing a pledge to uphold the Danish Constitution at Christiansborg, 14 April 2026
