= Carl Valentin (politician) =

Danish politician

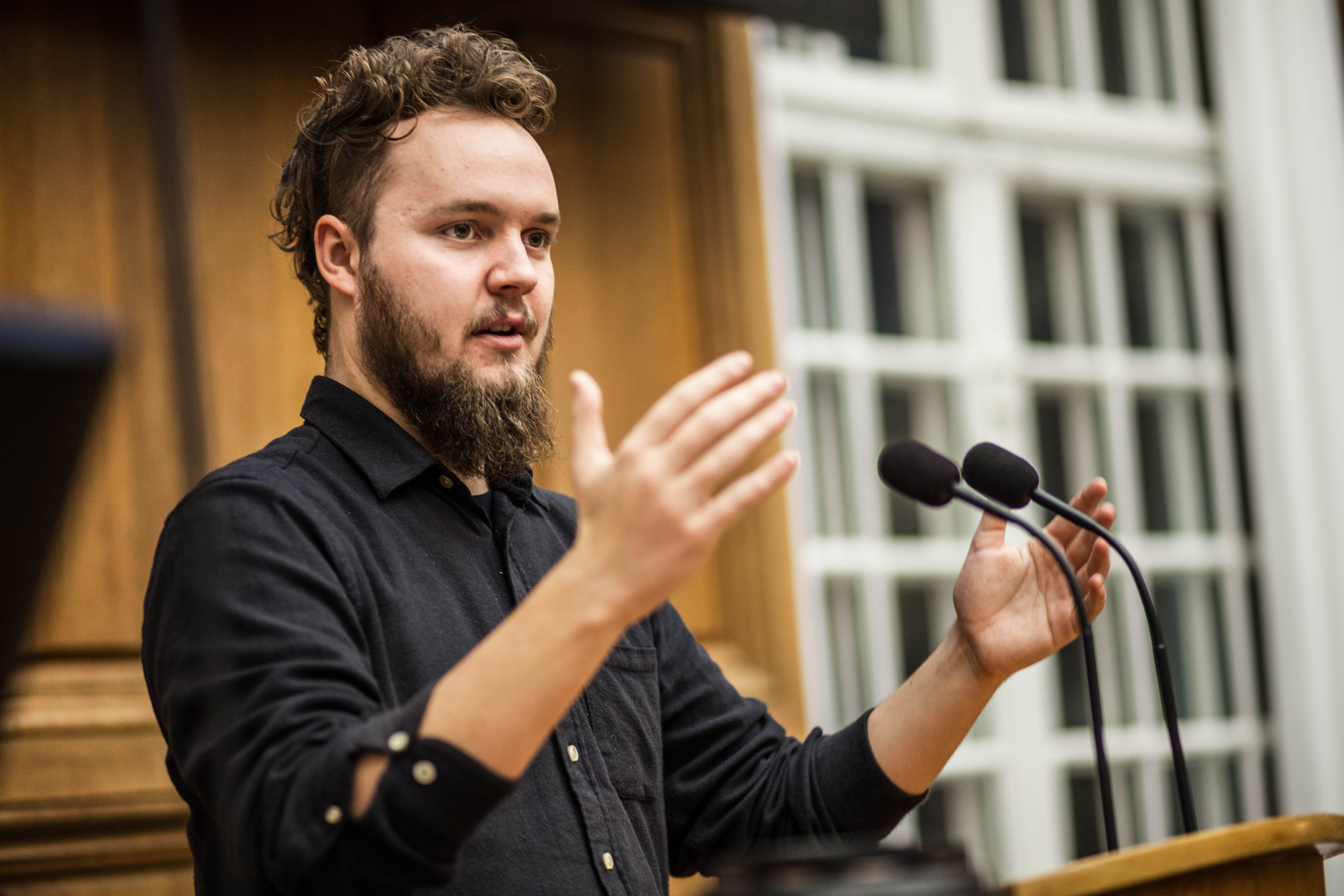
- Carl Valentin

Member of the Folketing
- Incumbent
- Assumed office 5 June 2019
- Constituency: Copenhagen

Personal details
- Born: Carl Valentin Lehrmann; 11 March 1992 (age 34) Odense, Denmark
- Party: Socialist People's Party

Carl Valentin Lehrmann (born 11 March 1992) is a Danish politician, who is a member of the Folketing for the Socialist People's Party. He was elected into parliament at the 2019 Danish general election.

== Political career ==
From 25 October 2017 to 10 November 2017 Valentin was a substitute member of the Folketing, substituting for Karsten Hønge. He was elected into parliament on his own mandate at the 2019 election, where he received 2,074 votes.
