= Mette Reissmann =

Danish politician (born 1963)

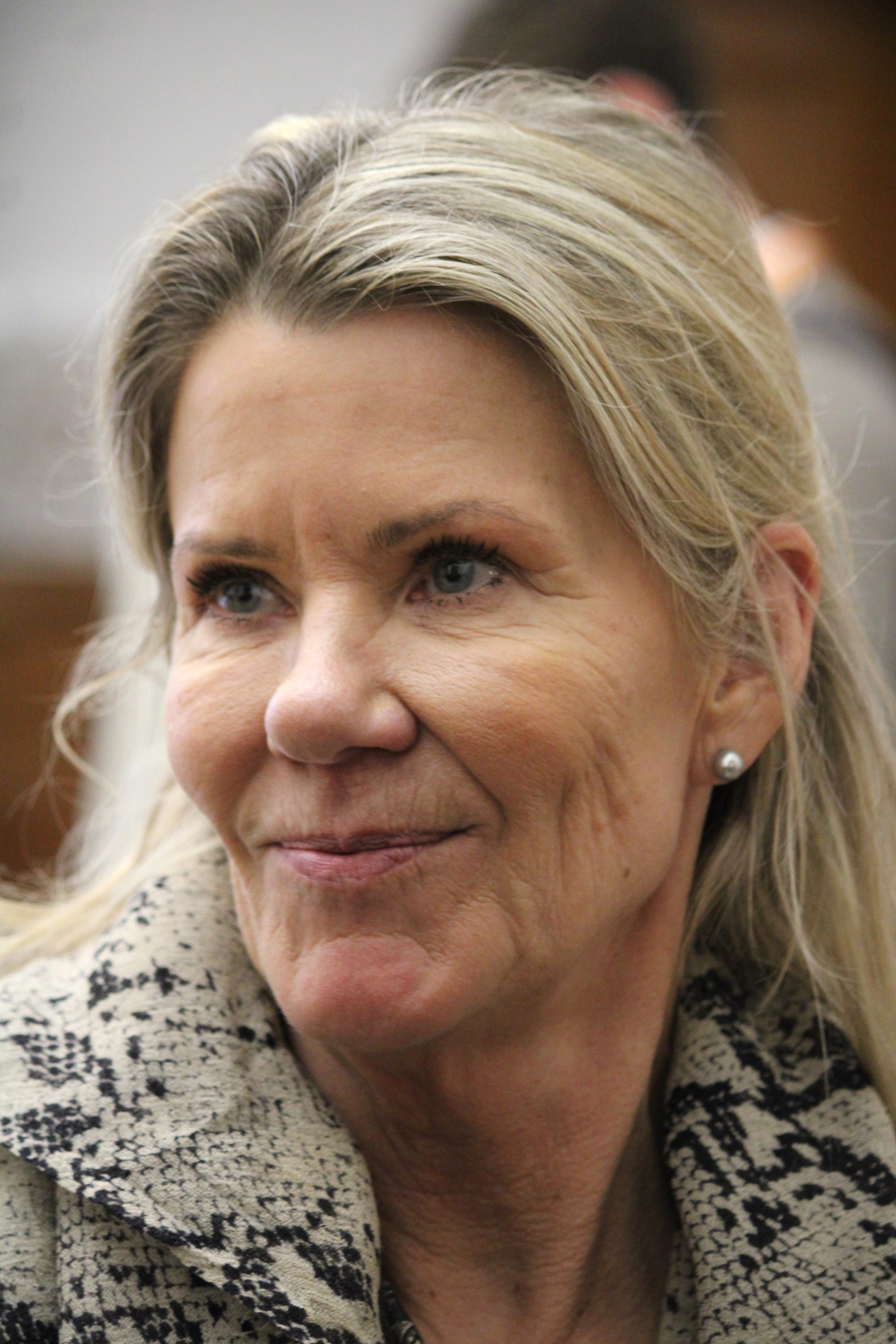
- Reissmann in 2026

Member of the Folketing
- Incumbent
- Assumed office 1 November 2022
- In office 2011–2019

Personal details
- Born: 4 October 1963 (age 62) Denmark
- Party: Social Democrats
- Occupation: Politician

Mette Reissmann (born 4 October 1963) is a Danish business lawyer, television host and politician. From 2011 to 2019 and again from 2022 she has been a member of the Folketing, elected for the Social Democrats.

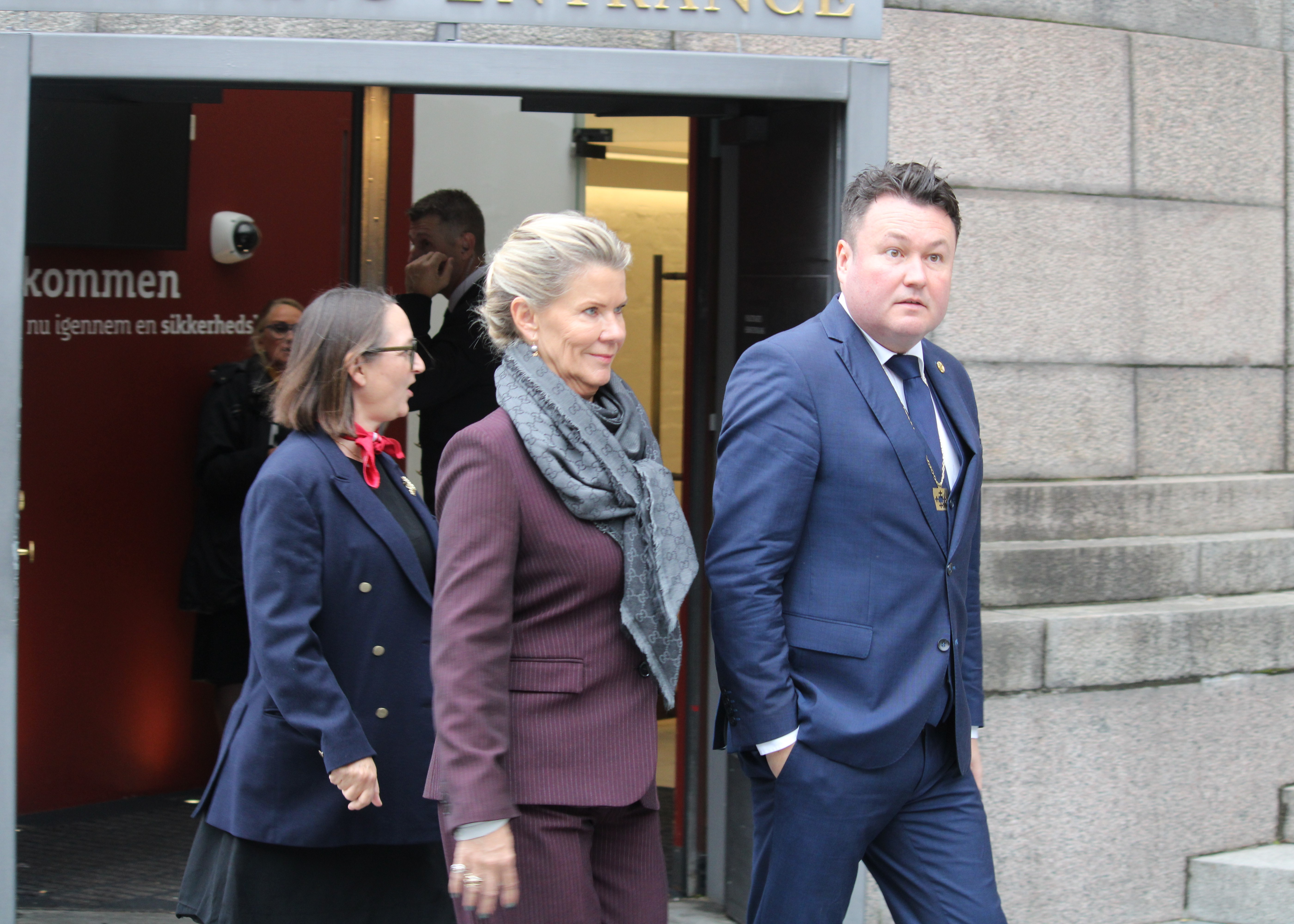
Reissmann with Anders Kronborg at the 2025 opening of parliament

== See also ==
- List of members of the Folketing, 2011–2015
- List of members of the Folketing, 2015–2019
- List of members of the Folketing, 2022–present
