= Peter Skaarup =

Danish politician

Peter Skaarup R.1
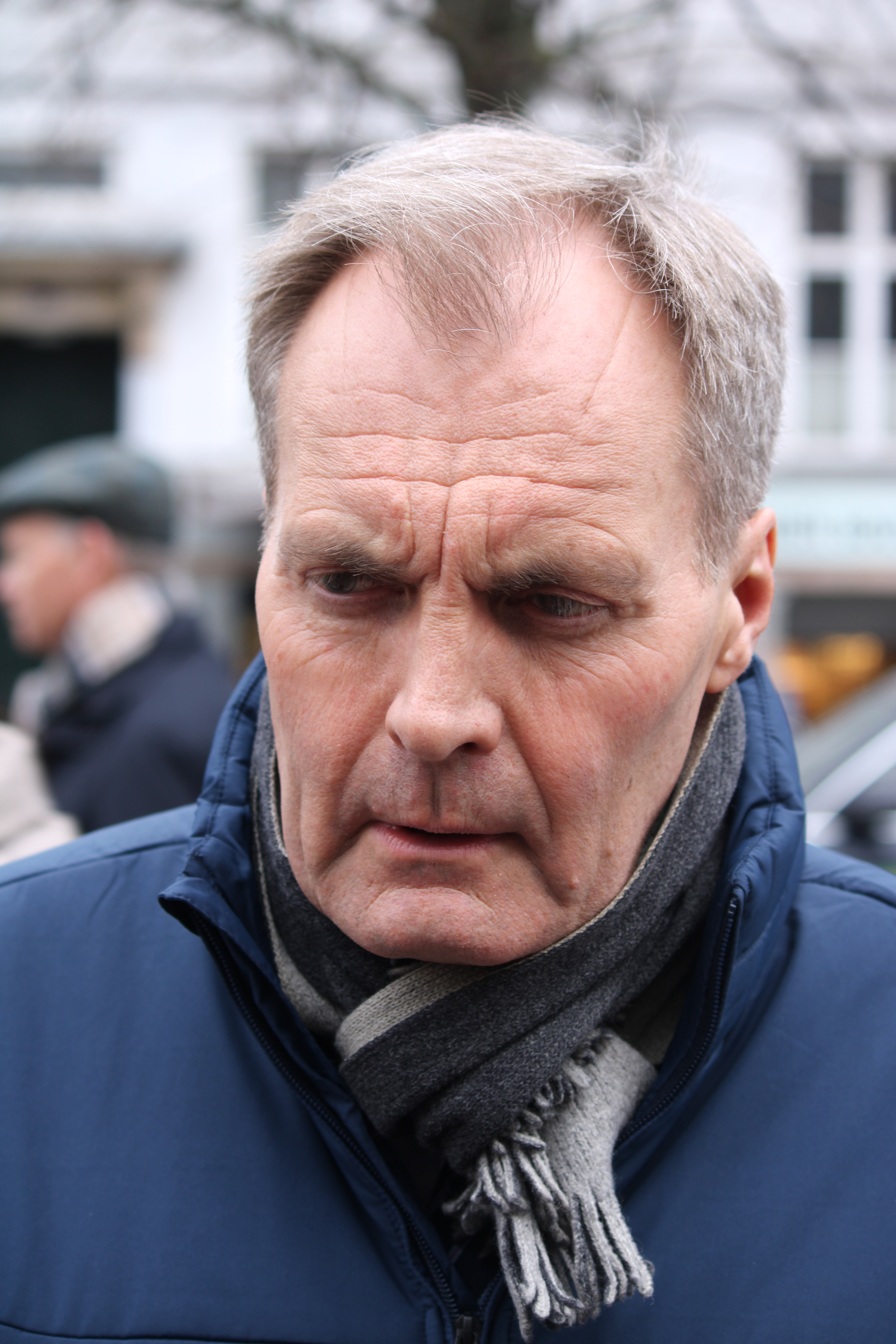
- Skaarup in 2026

Member of the Folketing
- Incumbent
- Assumed office 11 March 1998
- Constituency: Copenhagen (from 2007); Østre (1998—2007)

Personal details
- Born: 1 May 1964 (age 61) Aarhus, Denmark
- Party: Denmark Democrats (2022–present)
- Other political affiliations: Progress Party (until 1995); Danish People's Party (1995–2022)

Peter Skaarup (born 1 May 1964) is a Danish politician who currently serves as a member of the Folketing for Copenhagen. Skaarup has served in the Danish Folketing since 11 March 1998, was deputy chairman from 1998 to 2012, and was parliamentary leader for the Danish People's Party from 27 September 2012 to June 2022.

== Background ==
Skaarup grew up in the Aarhus suburb Brabrand. His father was the retired photo technician Hans Skaarup and former member of Folketing Birthe Skaarup. He graduated from Aarhus Cathedral School in 1982 and then worked as technical consultant for the Danish railway's travel division from 1986 to 1990. Skaarup is married to the veterinary nurse Therese Skaarup.

== Political career ==
In 1990 Skaarup also became party secretary of the political party Fremskridtspartiet but in 1995 he left to help co-found Dansk Folkeparti where he worked as secretary chief until 1998. By the end of the 1990s he also became a member of a number of organizations such as Østerbro local council, Dansk Udenrigspolitisk Institut, Copenhagen Capacity, Københavns Borgerrepræsentation, Danish People's Party board and been a board member of Ørestadsselskabet.

Skaarup was elected to Folketinget at the 1998 Danish general election and from 1998 to 2012 he was the vice-chairman of the Danish People's Party. He has been the president of the Folketinget's Committee for Law and vice-chairman of Folketinget's Committee for Transportation. Skaarup was for a number of years the official speaker on issues related to foreigners and immigrants, before he became speaker of law. In 2022 he left the Danish People's Party, and instead joined the Denmark Democrats, becoming the party's first MP.

=== Political stance ===
Skaarup supports immigrant repatriation from Denmark. He has advocated for the voluntary return of migrants "struggling to adapt to Danish society". He has stated that immigrants from outside of the European Union, and specifically "Nordic countries", were the main concern, and has clarified that the Danish government should be targeting "nationals from non-Western countries".

Skaarup also supports removing the age of criminal responsibility.

== Honours and decorations ==
- Order of the Dannebrog, Knight 1st Class
