= Sundbyøster (nomination district) =

- Sundbyøster
- Nomination district constituency for the Folketing
- Location of Sundbyøster within Copenhagen

- Location of Copenhagen within Denmark
- Municipalities: Copenhagen
- Constituency: Copenhagen
- Electorate: 42,793 (2022)

Current constituency
- Created: 2007

Sundbyøster nominating district is one of the 92 nominating districts that was created for Danish elections following the 2007 municipal reform. It is one of the 9 nominating districts in Copenhagen Municipality.

In general elections, the district is a very strong area for parties commonly associated with the red bloc, having been the district where they received their fifth highest vote share in the 2022 general election

== General elections results ==
=== General elections in the 2020s ===
2022 Danish general election

Parties	Vote		
Parties	Votes	%	+ / -
Social Democrats	7,249	20.88	+1.47
Red–Green Alliance	4,426	12.75	-3.22
Green Left	4,190	12.07	0.00
Moderates	3,336	9.61	New
The Alternative	3,229	9.30	+2.87
Liberal Alliance	2,875	8.28	+5.65
Venstre	2,809	8.09	-6.79
Social Liberals	2,486	7.16	-7.35
Conservatives	1,448	4.17	+0.18
Denmark Democrats	739	2.13	New
New Right	692	1.99	+0.58
Danish People's Party	589	1.70	-3.23
Independent Greens	484	1.39	New
Christian Democrats	88	0.25	-0.60
Flemming Blicher	57	0.16	New
Tom Gillesberg	14	0.04	-0.02
Total	34,711		

=== General elections in the 2010s ===
2019 Danish general election

Parties	Vote		
Parties	Votes	%	+ / -
Social Democrats	6,608	19.41	-3.16
Red–Green Alliance	5,435	15.97	-0.60
Venstre	5,066	14.88	+4.81
Social Liberals	4,939	14.51	+6.23
Green Left	4,107	12.07	+5.44
The Alternative	2,187	6.43	-4.53
Danish People's Party	1,679	4.93	-8.70
Conservatives	1,359	3.99	+1.67
Liberal Alliance	894	2.63	-5.62
Stram Kurs	552	1.62	New
New Right	480	1.41	New
Klaus Riskær Pedersen Party	382	1.12	New
Christian Democrats	290	0.85	+0.41
Pierre Tavares	31	0.09	New
Tom Gillesberg	21	0.06	+0.02
John Erik Wagner	6	0.02	-0.05
John Jørgensen	1	0.00	New
Tommy Schou Christesen	1	0.00	New
Total	34,038		

2015 Danish general election

Parties	Vote		
Parties	Votes	%	+ / -
Social Democrats	7,339	22.57	+2.31
Red–Green Alliance	5,386	16.57	+0.31
Danish People's Party	4,432	13.63	+3.89
The Alternative	3,562	10.96	New
Venstre	3,275	10.07	-5.59
Social Liberals	2,691	8.28	-7.04
Liberal Alliance	2,683	8.25	+2.81
Green Left	2,156	6.63	-6.57
Conservatives	755	2.32	-1.36
Christian Democrats	144	0.44	+0.15
Kashif Ahmad	53	0.16	New
John Erik Wagner	24	0.07	+0.03
Tom Gillesberg	13	0.04	0.00
Jan Elkjær	0	0.00	New
Total	32,513		

2011 Danish general election

Parties	Vote		
Parties	Votes	%	+ / -
Social Democrats	6,341	20.26	-5.92
Red–Green Alliance	5,088	16.26	+10.92
Venstre	4,900	15.66	+1.88
Social Liberals	4,795	15.32	+7.49
Green Left	4,130	13.20	-8.81
Danish People's Party	3,047	9.74	-2.65
Liberal Alliance	1,704	5.44	+1.50
Conservatives	1,153	3.68	-4.14
Christian Democrats	90	0.29	-0.33
John Erik Wagner	14	0.04	-0.02
Tom Gillesberg	13	0.04	+0.03
Klaus Trier Tuxen	11	0.04	New
Mads Vestergaard	10	0.03	New
Per Zimmermann	2	0.01	New
Morten Versner	0	0.00	New
Total	31,298		

=== General elections in the 2000s ===
2007 Danish general election

Parties	Vote		
Parties	Votes	%	+ / -
Social Democrats	7,859	26.18	
Green Left	6,605	22.01	
Venstre	4,137	13.78	
Danish People's Party	3,720	12.39	
Social Liberals	2,350	7.83	
Conservatives	2,346	7.82	
Red–Green Alliance	1,604	5.34	
New Alliance	1,183	3.94	
Christian Democrats	187	0.62	
John Erik Wagner	17	0.06	
Tom Gillesberg	3	0.01	
Amir Becirovic	2	0.01	
Nicolai Krogh Mittet	1	0.00	
Vibeke Baden Laursen	0	0.00	
Total	30,014		

== European Parliament elections results ==
2024 European Parliament election in Denmark

Parties	Vote		
Parties	Votes	%	+ / -
Green Left	7,129	28.27	+5.47
Red–Green Alliance	3,965	15.72	+5.15
Social Liberals	2,876	11.40	-3.67
Social Democrats	2,802	11.11	-4.96
Venstre	1,647	6.53	-4.41
Conservatives	1,574	6.24	+1.57
Liberal Alliance	1,503	5.96	+3.98
The Alternative	1,341	5.32	-2.31
Moderates	1,098	4.35	New
Danish People's Party	921	3.65	-2.22
Denmark Democrats	365	1.45	New
Total	25,221		

2019 European Parliament election in Denmark

Parties	Vote		
Parties	Votes	%	+ / -
Green Left	6,138	22.80	+2.87
Social Democrats	4,326	16.07	-2.62
Social Liberals	4,057	15.07	+3.65
Venstre	2,944	10.94	+2.26
Red–Green Alliance	2,846	10.57	New
The Alternative	2,055	7.63	New
Danish People's Party	1,580	5.87	-12.87
Conservatives	1,256	4.67	-0.41
People's Movement against the EU	1,184	4.40	-9.97
Liberal Alliance	533	1.98	-1.10
Total	26,919		

2014 European Parliament election in Denmark

Parties	Vote		
Parties	Votes	%	+ / -
Green Left	3,971	19.93	-5.02
Danish People's Party	3,735	18.74	+6.29
Social Democrats	3,725	18.69	-1.99
People's Movement against the EU	2,864	14.37	+2.12
Social Liberals	2,276	11.42	+3.89
Venstre	1,730	8.68	-2.04
Conservatives	1,012	5.08	-2.24
Liberal Alliance	614	3.08	+2.32
Total	19,927		

2009 European Parliament election in Denmark

Parties	Vote		
Parties	Votes	%	+ / -
Green Left	4,867	24.95	
Social Democrats	4,034	20.68	
Danish People's Party	2,429	12.45	
People's Movement against the EU	2,389	12.25	
Venstre	2,090	10.72	
Social Liberals	1,469	7.53	
Conservatives	1,428	7.32	
June Movement	650	3.33	
Liberal Alliance	148	0.76	
Total	19,504		

== Referendums ==
2022 Danish European Union opt-out referendum

Option	Votes	%
✓ YES	17,135	67.90
X NO	8,100	32.10

2015 Danish European Union opt-out referendum

Option	Votes	%
X NO	13,986	55.39
✓ YES	11,263	44.61

2014 Danish Unified Patent Court membership referendum

Option	Votes	%
✓ YES	10,598	57.26
X NO	7,909	42.74

2009 Danish Act of Succession referendum

Option	Votes	%
✓ YES	13,613	83.33
X NO	2,723	16.67
