= Sundbyvester (nomination district) =

- Sundbyvester
- Nomination district constituency for the Folketing
- Location of Sundbyvester within Copenhagen

- Location of Copenhagen within Denmark
- Municipalities: Copenhagen
- Constituency: Copenhagen
- Electorate: 53,656 (2022)

Current constituency
- Created: 2007

Sundbyvester nominating district is one of the 92 nominating districts for Danish elections. It is one of the 9 nominating districts in Copenhagen Municipality.

In general elections, the district is a very strong area for parties commonly associated with the red bloc.

== General elections results ==
=== General elections in the 2020s ===
2022 Danish general election

Parties	Vote		
Parties	Votes	%	+ / -
Social Democrats	8,212	19.08	+1.58
Red–Green Alliance	5,532	12.85	-2.65
Green Left	5,067	11.77	-0.18
Moderates	4,171	9.69	New
Liberal Alliance	3,944	9.16	+5.94
The Alternative	3,771	8.76	+2.24
Venstre	3,664	8.51	-6.76
Social Liberals	3,263	7.58	-9.22
Conservatives	1,893	4.40	-0.04
Independent Greens	1,129	2.62	New
Denmark Democrats	812	1.89	New
New Right	773	1.80	+0.41
Danish People's Party	641	1.49	-2.77
Christian Democrats	83	0.19	-0.44
Flemming Blicher	62	0.14	New
Tom Gillesberg	22	0.05	+0.01
Total	43,039		

=== General elections in the 2010s ===
2019 Danish general election

Parties	Vote		
Parties	Votes	%	+ / -
Social Democrats	7,215	17.50	-5.03
Social Liberals	6,925	16.80	+7.65
Red–Green Alliance	6,390	15.50	-0.19
Venstre	6,295	15.27	+4.78
Green Left	4,927	11.95	+5.60
The Alternative	2,687	6.52	-4.47
Conservatives	1,831	4.44	+2.01
Danish People's Party	1,758	4.26	-7.80
Liberal Alliance	1,326	3.22	-6.48
New Right	571	1.39	New
Stram Kurs	543	1.32	New
Klaus Riskær Pedersen Party	429	1.04	New
Christian Democrats	261	0.63	+0.25
Pierre Tavares	32	0.08	New
Tom Gillesberg	16	0.04	-0.01
John Erik Wagner	8	0.02	-0.02
John Jørgensen	5	0.01	New
Tommy Schou Christesen	4	0.01	New
Total	41,223		

2015 Danish general election

Parties	Vote		
Parties	Votes	%	+ / -
Social Democrats	8,223	22.53	+3.07
Red–Green Alliance	5,726	15.69	-0.31
Danish People's Party	4,400	12.06	+3.11
The Alternative	4,010	10.99	New
Venstre	3,830	10.49	-4.76
Liberal Alliance	3,540	9.70	+3.13
Social Liberals	3,340	9.15	-7.33
Green Left	2,318	6.35	-6.04
Conservatives	886	2.43	-2.13
Christian Democrats	138	0.38	+0.16
Kashif Ahmad	56	0.15	New
Tom Gillesberg	17	0.05	+0.02
John Erik Wagner	13	0.04	+0.02
Jan Elkjær	1	0.00	New
Total	36,498		

2011 Danish general election

Parties	Vote		
Parties	Votes	%	+ / -
Social Democrats	6,740	19.46	-5.64
Social Liberals	5,708	16.48	+7.82
Red–Green Alliance	5,540	16.00	+9.83
Venstre	5,280	15.25	+1.74
Green Left	4,291	12.39	-9.17
Danish People's Party	3,098	8.95	-2.45
Liberal Alliance	2,276	6.57	+2.26
Conservatives	1,578	4.56	-4.20
Christian Democrats	77	0.22	-0.27
Klaus Trier Tuxen	17	0.05	New
Tom Gillesberg	9	0.03	0.00
John Erik Wagner	7	0.02	+0.01
Mads Vestergaard	5	0.01	New
Morten Versner	1	0.00	New
Per Zimmermann	0	0.00	New
Total	34,627		

=== General elections in the 2000s ===
2007 Danish general election

Parties	Vote		
Parties	Votes	%	+ / -
Social Democrats	7,889	25.10	
Green Left	6,776	21.56	
Venstre	4,245	13.51	
Danish People's Party	3,583	11.40	
Conservatives	2,753	8.76	
Social Liberals	2,721	8.66	
Red–Green Alliance	1,939	6.17	
New Alliance	1,356	4.31	
Christian Democrats	155	0.49	
Tom Gillesberg	8	0.03	
John Erik Wagner	4	0.01	
Vibeke Baden Laursen	1	0.00	
Amir Becirovic	0	0.00	
Nicolai Krogh Mittet	0	0.00	
Total	31,430		

== European Parliament elections results ==
2024 European Parliament election in Denmark

Parties	Vote		
Parties	Votes	%	+ / -
Green Left	8,254	26.40	+3.83
Red–Green Alliance	5,002	16.00	+5.80
Social Liberals	3,763	12.03	-5.3
Social Democrats	3,211	10.27	-4.69
Venstre	2,216	7.09	-4.45
Conservatives	2,019	6.46	+1.4
Liberal Alliance	1,989	6.36	+4.11
The Alternative	1,683	5.38	-1.59
Moderates	1,579	5.05	New
Danish People's Party	1,111	3.55	-1.93
Denmark Democrats	444	1.42	New
Total	31,271		

2019 European Parliament election in Denmark

Parties	Vote		
Parties	Votes	%	+ / -
Green Left	7,363	22.57	+2.87
Social Liberals	5,653	17.33	+4.52
Social Democrats	4,880	14.96	-4.01
Venstre	3,765	11.54	+2.28
Red–Green Alliance	3,326	10.20	New
The Alternative	2,272	6.97	New
Danish People's Party	1,789	5.48	-12.26
Conservatives	1,649	5.06	-0.50
People's Movement against the EU	1,190	3.65	-8.50
Liberal Alliance	733	2.25	-1.57
Total	32,620		

2014 European Parliament election in Denmark

Parties	Vote		
Parties	Votes	%	+ / -
Green Left	4,511	19.70	-4.24
Social Democrats	4,344	18.97	-1.52
Danish People's Party	4,062	17.74	+5.77
Social Liberals	2,934	12.81	+4.42
People's Movement against the EU	2,783	12.15	+0.02
Venstre	2,120	9.26	-1.82
Conservatives	1,273	5.56	-2.53
Liberal Alliance	876	3.82	+2.88
Total	22,903		

2009 European Parliament election in Denmark

Parties	Vote		
Parties	Votes	%	+ / -
Green Left	5,043	23.94	
Social Democrats	4,315	20.49	
People's Movement against the EU	2,555	12.13	
Danish People's Party	2,522	11.97	
Venstre	2,334	11.08	
Social Liberals	1,768	8.39	
Conservatives	1,704	8.09	
June Movement	623	2.96	
Liberal Alliance	198	0.94	
Total	21,062		

== Referendums ==
2022 Danish European Union opt-out referendum

Option	Votes	%
✓ YES	21,591	69.68
X NO	9,395	30.32

2015 Danish European Union opt-out referendum

Option	Votes	%
X NO	14,927	51.04
✓ YES	14,321	48.96

2014 Danish Unified Patent Court membership referendum

Option	Votes	%
✓ YES	12,966	58.11
X NO	9,346	41.89

2009 Danish Act of Succession referendum

Option	Votes	%
✓ YES	14,601	83.50
X NO	2,886	16.50
