= Rosa Lund =

Danish politician (born 1986)

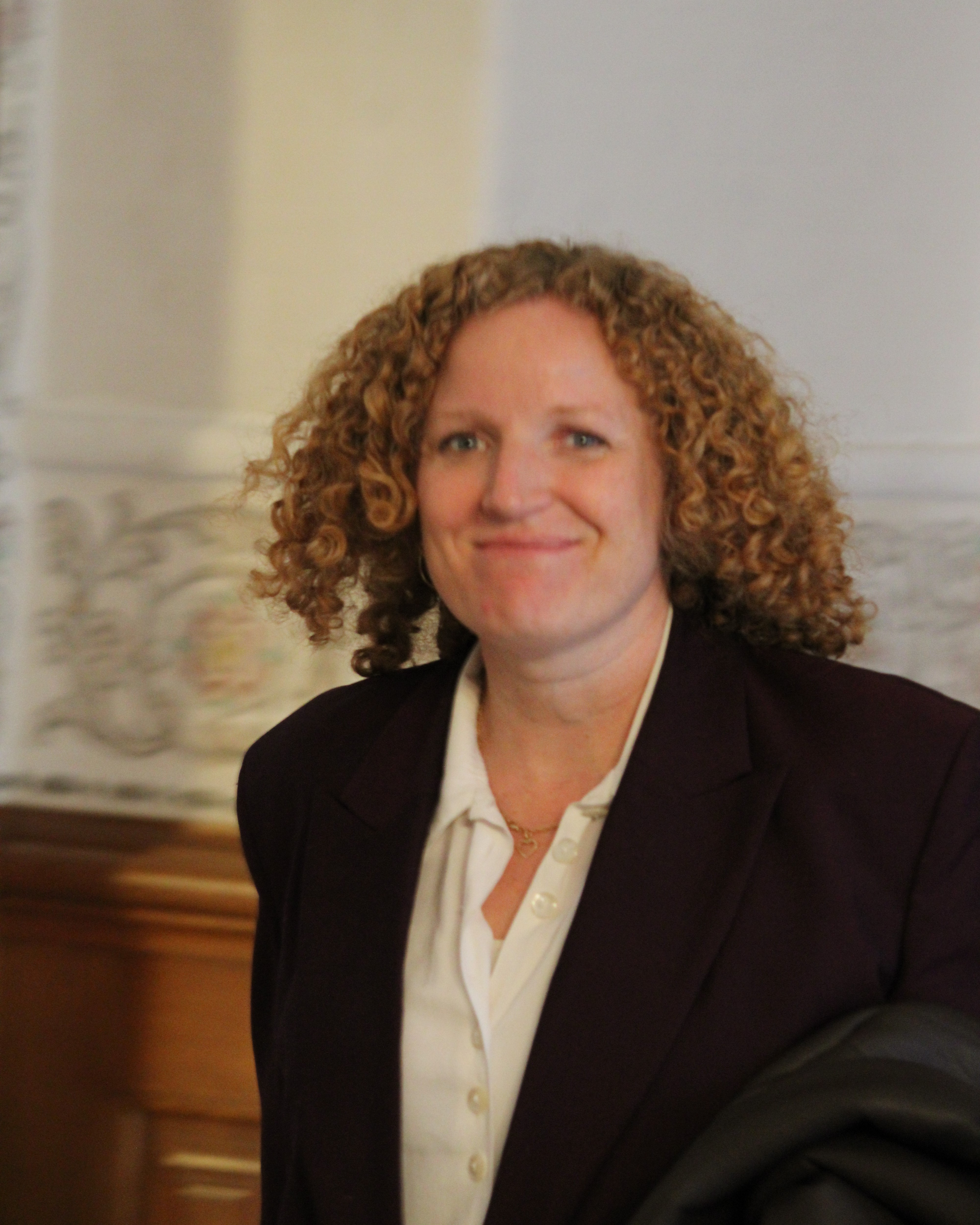
- Lund in 2025

Member of the Folketing
- Incumbent
- Assumed office 5 June 2019
- Constituency: Copenhagen
- In office 15 September 2011 – 18 June 2015
- Constituency: Copenhagen

Personal details
- Born: 4 December 1986 (age 39) Copenhagen, Denmark
- Party: Red–Green Alliance

Rosa Lund (born 4 December 1986) is a Danish politician, who is a member of the Folketing for the Red–Green Alliance (Danish: Enhedslisten) political party. She was elected at the 2019 Danish general election, and previously sat in parliament from 2011 to 2015.

== Education ==
Lund studied at the University of Copenhagen between 2009 and 2018 and has a bachelor's degree in political science and a master's degree in law.

== Political career ==
Lund was first elected into parliament at the 2011 election, where she received 1,150 votes. She ran again at the 2015 election, receiving 1,463 votes. Despite this being more votes than she received at the 2011 election, it wasn't enough for a parliamentary seat. This result led her to become the Red-Green Alliance's primary substitute in the Copenhagen constituency. She was called upon once during the term, acting as substitute for Johanne Schmidt-Nielsen from 5 March 2018 to 28 February 2019. At the 2019 election, she received 3,653 votes and was elected directly into parliament.

== Personal life ==
Rosa Lund suffers from the medical condition sclerosis and has, since she made it public, made it part of her political agenda to better conditions for others who suffer from the same condition.

== Sentence ==
On 6 October 2007, Rosa Lund broke into a private property on Grøndalsvænge Allé in Copenhagen's North East in connection with the abolishment of the Youth House on Jagtvej 69. She was arrested by police and subsequently fined DKK 750 for illegal intrusion followingthe Danish penal code's paragraph 264.

When Rosa Lund, as political education spokesman and MP for Red–Green Alliance in 2012, was interviewed by MetroXpress about the sentence she said:

It's a bit hard to answer whether I'd do anything illegal again. It depends on the case. If there are people who are unfairly treated, asylum seekers for instance, then it can become necessary to break the law.

The legal spokesmen of Conservative and Danish People's Party called the remark respectively ”problematic” and ”unheard-of”. In February 2021 Pernille Vermund (NB) asked in Parliament whether the quote to MetroXpress was still Rosa Lund's opinion. In response, Rosa Lund replied "No".1:13:24
