= Lars Aslan Rasmussen =

Danish politician

Member of the Folketing
- Incumbent
- Assumed office 4 April 2016
- Constituency: Copenhagen

Personal details
- Born: 31 October 1978 (age 47) Copenhagen, Denmark
- Party: Social Democrats

Lars Aslan Rasmussen (born 31 October 1978 in Copenhagen) is a Danish politician, who is a member of the Folketing for the Social Democrats political party. He entered parliament on 4 April 2016 when Helle Thorning-Schmidt resigned her seat.

== Political career ==
In the 2015 Danish general election Rasmussen had been elected as a substitute for the Social Democrats in the Copenhagen constituency. When Helle Thorning-Schmidt resigned her seat on 4 April 2016, Rasmussen entered parliament and took over the seat. He ran in the 2019 election and was elected directly into parliament with 4,279 votes cast for him.
