= Inner City (nomination district) =

- Indre By
- Nomination district constituency for the Folketing
- Location of Inner City within Copenhagen

- Location of Copenhagen within Denmark
- Municipalities: Copenhagen
- Constituency: Copenhagen
- Electorate: 41,579 (2022)

Current constituency
- Created: 2007

Inner City nominating district is one of the 92 nominating districts in Denmark. It was latest updated following the 2007 municipal reform. It is one of the 9 nominating districts in Copenhagen Municipality.

In general elections, the district is a very strong area for parties commonly associated with the red bloc.

== General elections results ==
=== General elections in the 2020s ===
2022 Danish general election

Parties	Vote		
Parties	Votes	%	+ / -
Red–Green Alliance	4,998	14.25	-3.18
Social Democrats	4,869	13.88	+1.71
The Alternative	4,068	11.60	+4.42
Liberal Alliance	3,963	11.30	+8.00
Moderates	3,847	10.97	New
Green Left	3,533	10.07	-0.72
Venstre	3,295	9.40	-8.26
Social Liberals	3,027	8.63	-10.38
Conservatives	2,011	5.73	-1.04
New Right	401	1.14	-0.07
Denmark Democrats	338	0.96	New
Independent Greens	304	0.87	New
Danish People's Party	290	0.83	-1.05
Christian Democrats	62	0.18	-0.34
Flemming Blicher	45	0.13	New
Tom Gillesberg	20	0.06	+0.01
Total	35,071		

=== General elections in the 2010s ===
2019 Danish general election

Parties	Vote		
Parties	Votes	%	+ / -
Social Liberals	6,629	19.01	+7.12
Venstre	6,158	17.66	+6.34
Red–Green Alliance	6,078	17.43	+1.28
Social Democrats	4,243	12.17	-7.12
Green Left	3,763	10.79	+4.66
The Alternative	2,505	7.18	-6.08
Conservatives	2,361	6.77	+3.07
Liberal Alliance	1,152	3.30	-8.87
Danish People's Party	654	1.88	-3.83
New Right	422	1.21	New
Klaus Riskær Pedersen Party	389	1.12	New
Stram Kurs	292	0.84	New
Christian Democrats	181	0.52	+0.31
Pierre Tavares	20	0.06	New
Tom Gillesberg	16	0.05	0.00
John Jørgensen	7	0.02	New
John Erik Wagner	2	0.01	-0.01
Tommy Schou Christesen	0	0.00	New
Total	34,872		

2015 Danish general election

Parties	Vote		
Parties	Votes	%	+ / -
Social Democrats	6,562	19.29	+5.52
Red–Green Alliance	5,495	16.15	-2.35
The Alternative	4,510	13.26	New
Liberal Alliance	4,140	12.17	+3.92
Social Liberals	4,044	11.89	-9.15
Venstre	3,852	11.32	-4.37
Green Left	2,085	6.13	-5.47
Danish People's Party	1,944	5.71	+1.47
Conservatives	1,260	3.70	-2.95
Christian Democrats	71	0.21	+0.04
Kashif Ahmad	32	0.09	New
Tom Gillesberg	16	0.05	+0.02
John Erik Wagner	6	0.02	+0.02
Jan Elkjær	2	0.01	New
Total	34,019		

2011 Danish general election

Parties	Vote		
Parties	Votes	%	+ / -
Social Liberals	6,937	21.04	+9.30
Red–Green Alliance	6,100	18.50	+9.40
Venstre	5,174	15.69	+1.13
Social Democrats	4,541	13.77	-5.41
Green Left	3,824	11.60	-9.82
Liberal Alliance	2,719	8.25	+2.26
Conservatives	2,193	6.65	-5.38
Danish People's Party	1,397	4.24	-1.33
Christian Democrats	56	0.17	-0.21
Klaus Trier Tuxen	20	0.06	New
Tom Gillesberg	10	0.03	+0.01
Mads Vestergaard	4	0.01	New
Morten Versner	0	0.00	New
John Erik Wagner	0	0.00	-0.01
Per Zimmermann	0	0.00	New
Total	32,975		

=== General elections in the 2000s ===
2007 Danish general election

Parties	Vote		
Parties	Votes	%	+ / -
Green Left	6,601	21.42	
Social Democrats	5,912	19.18	
Venstre	4,487	14.56	
Conservatives	3,707	12.03	
Social Liberals	3,620	11.74	
Red–Green Alliance	2,805	9.10	
New Alliance	1,847	5.99	
Danish People's Party	1,716	5.57	
Christian Democrats	116	0.38	
Tom Gillesberg	5	0.02	
John Erik Wagner	4	0.01	
Vibeke Baden Laursen	1	0.00	
Nicolai Krogh Mittet	1	0.00	
Amir Becirovic	0	0.00	
Total	30,822		

== European Parliament elections results ==
2024 European Parliament election in Denmark

Parties	Vote		
Parties	Votes	%	+ / -
Green Left	7,416	25.89	+2.68
Red–Green Alliance	4,413	15.40	+6.17
Social Liberals	3,704	12.93	-6.26
Social Democrats	2,555	8.92	-2.61
Venstre	2,284	7.97	-5.68
Liberal Alliance	2,256	7.88	+5.42
Conservatives	2,128	7.43	+0.19
Moderates	1,669	5.83	New
The Alternative	1,375	4.80	-2.86
Danish People's Party	641	2.24	-0.85
Denmark Democrats	206	0.72	New
Total	28,647		

2019 European Parliament election in Denmark

Parties	Vote		
Parties	Votes	%	+ / -
Green Left	6,984	23.21	+1.10
Social Liberals	5,774	19.19	+3.65
Venstre	4,108	13.65	+2.72
Social Democrats	3,468	11.53	-6.50
Red–Green Alliance	2,778	9.23	New
The Alternative	2,305	7.66	New
Conservatives	2,179	7.24	-0.36
Danish People's Party	930	3.09	-6.54
People's Movement against the EU	820	2.73	-9.27
Liberal Alliance	740	2.46	-1.71
Total	30,086		

2014 European Parliament election in Denmark

Parties	Vote		
Parties	Votes	%	+ / -
Green Left	5,176	22.11	-3.90
Social Democrats	4,220	18.03	+0.29
Social Liberals	3,638	15.54	+4.46
People's Movement against the EU	2,808	12.00	+0.52
Venstre	2,558	10.93	-2.92
Danish People's Party	2,254	9.63	+3.19
Conservatives	1,778	7.60	-1.87
Liberal Alliance	976	4.17	+3.13
Total	23,408		

2009 European Parliament election in Denmark

Parties	Vote		
Parties	Votes	%	+ / -
Green Left	5,841	26.01	
Social Democrats	3,983	17.74	
Venstre	3,110	13.85	
People's Movement against the EU	2,577	11.48	
Social Liberals	2,489	11.08	
Conservatives	2,126	9.47	
Danish People's Party	1,446	6.44	
June Movement	651	2.90	
Liberal Alliance	233	1.04	
Total	22,456		

== Referendums ==
2022 Danish European Union opt-out referendum

Option	Votes	%
✓ YES	19,612	74.51
X NO	6,710	25.49

2015 Danish European Union opt-out referendum

Option	Votes	%
✓ YES	15,964	58.38
X NO	11,381	41.62

2014 Danish Unified Patent Court membership referendum

Option	Votes	%
✓ YES	14,510	65.45
X NO	7,658	34.55

2009 Danish Act of Succession referendum

Option	Votes	%
✓ YES	13,914	83.69
X NO	2,712	16.31
