= Jan E. Jørgensen =

Danish politician

Jan Ejnar Jørgensen
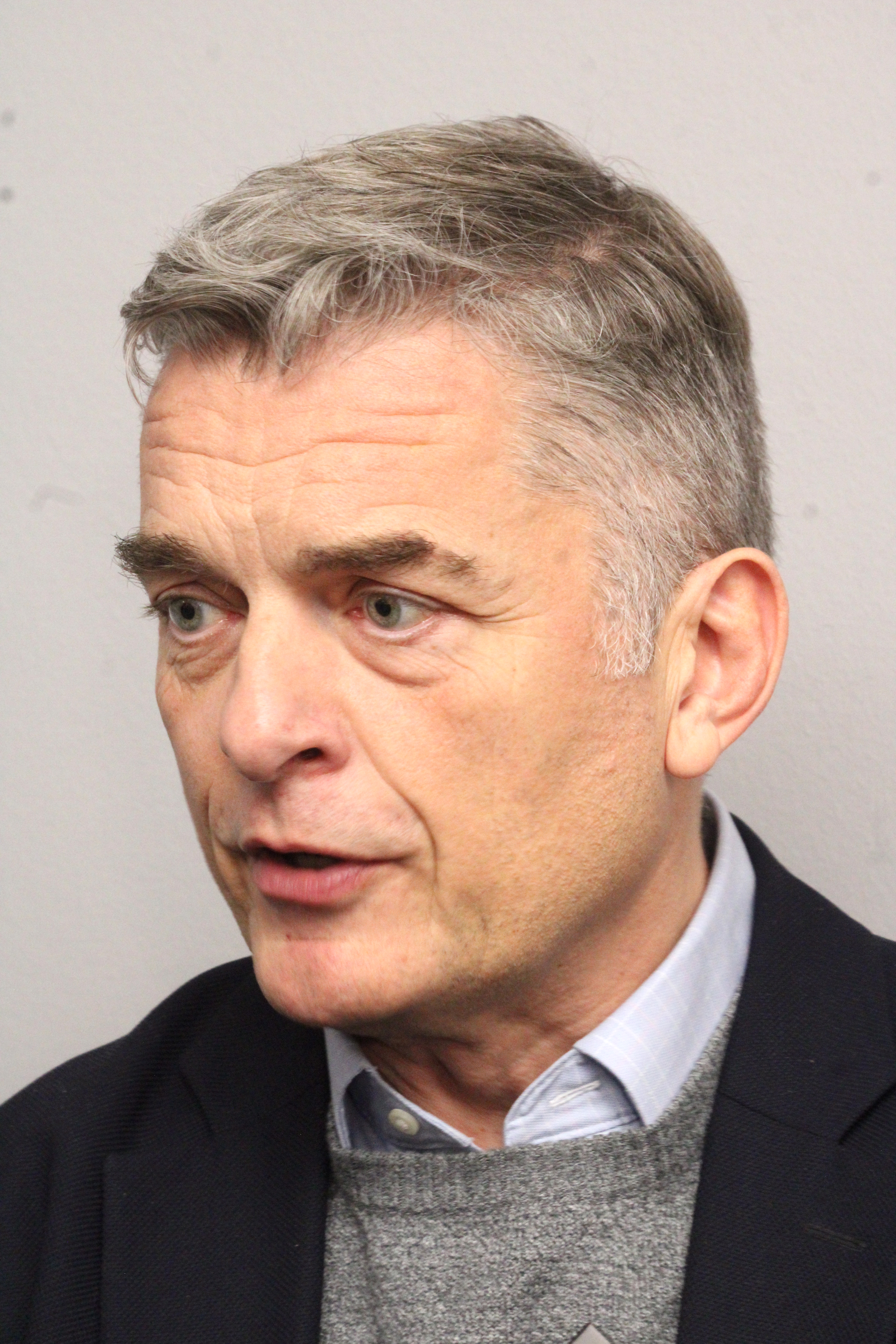
- Jørgensen in 2026

Member of the Folketing
- In office 2011–2026
- Constituency: Zealand

Personal details
- Born: 19 February 1965 (age 61) Frederiksberg, Denmark
- Party: Venstre

Jan Ejnar Jørgensen (born 19 February 1965) is a Danish politician. A member of the political party Venstre, Jørgensen has been a member of the Danish parliament for 15 years; he was elected in the 2011 Danish general election and stayed a member until the election in 2026 where he did not get reelected.

== Political career ==
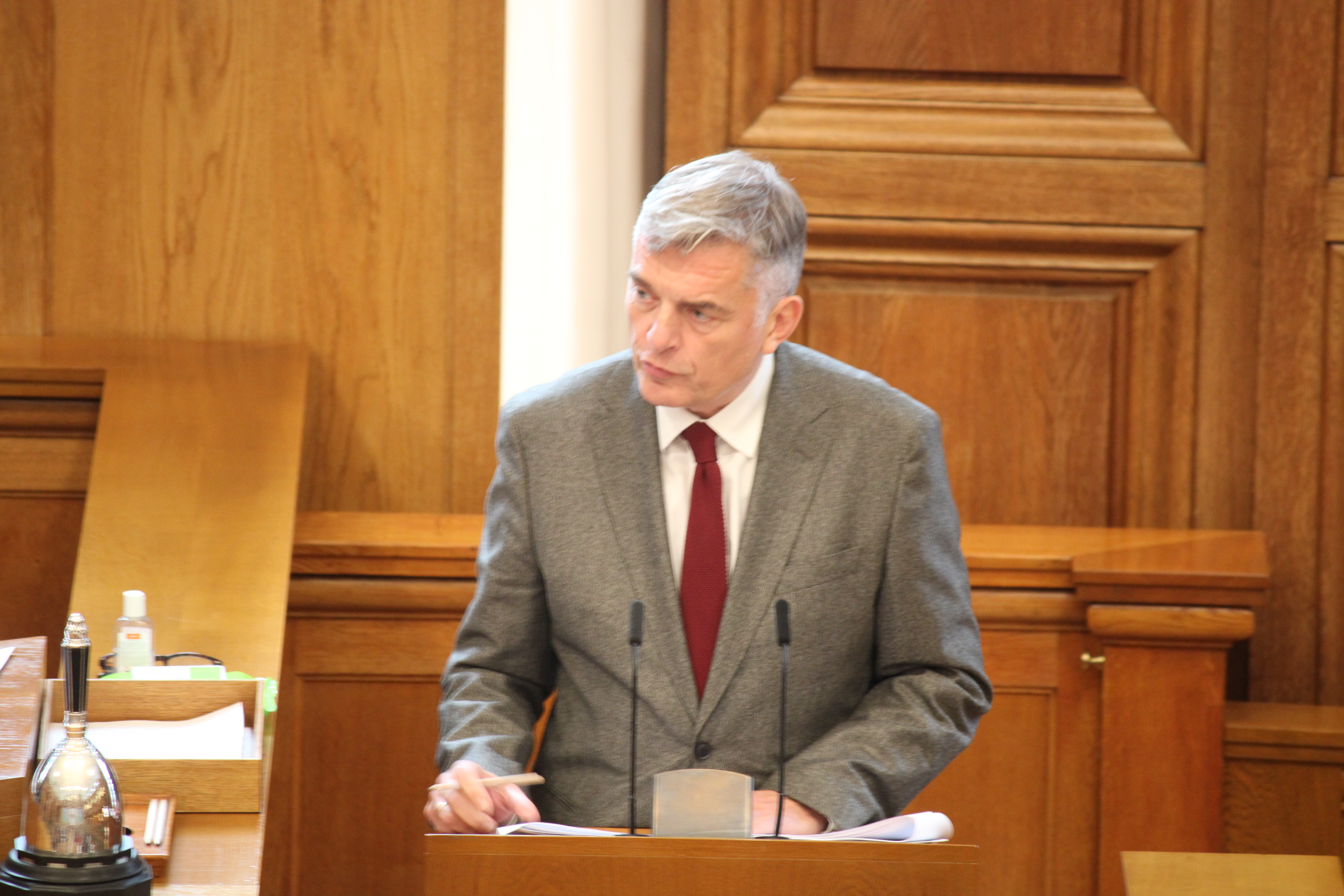
E. Jørgensen speaking in parliament, October 2025

Jørgensen began his policatal career as a member of Venstre's youth wing, Venstres Ungdom. He was associated with them from 1983 to 1990. Jørgensen has been a member of the municipal council of Frederiksberg Municipality since 2010, and been the deputy mayor since 2017.

Jørgensen was first elected into the Folketing at the 2011 election. He was reelected in 2015 Danish general election and 2019. He received 3,254 personal votes in the election in 2015 and 4,597 personal votes in the election in 2019. In 2026 he lost reelection, receiving 3,538 votes.
