= Member of the Folketing =

Member of Danish parliament

- Folketingsmedlem (Danish)
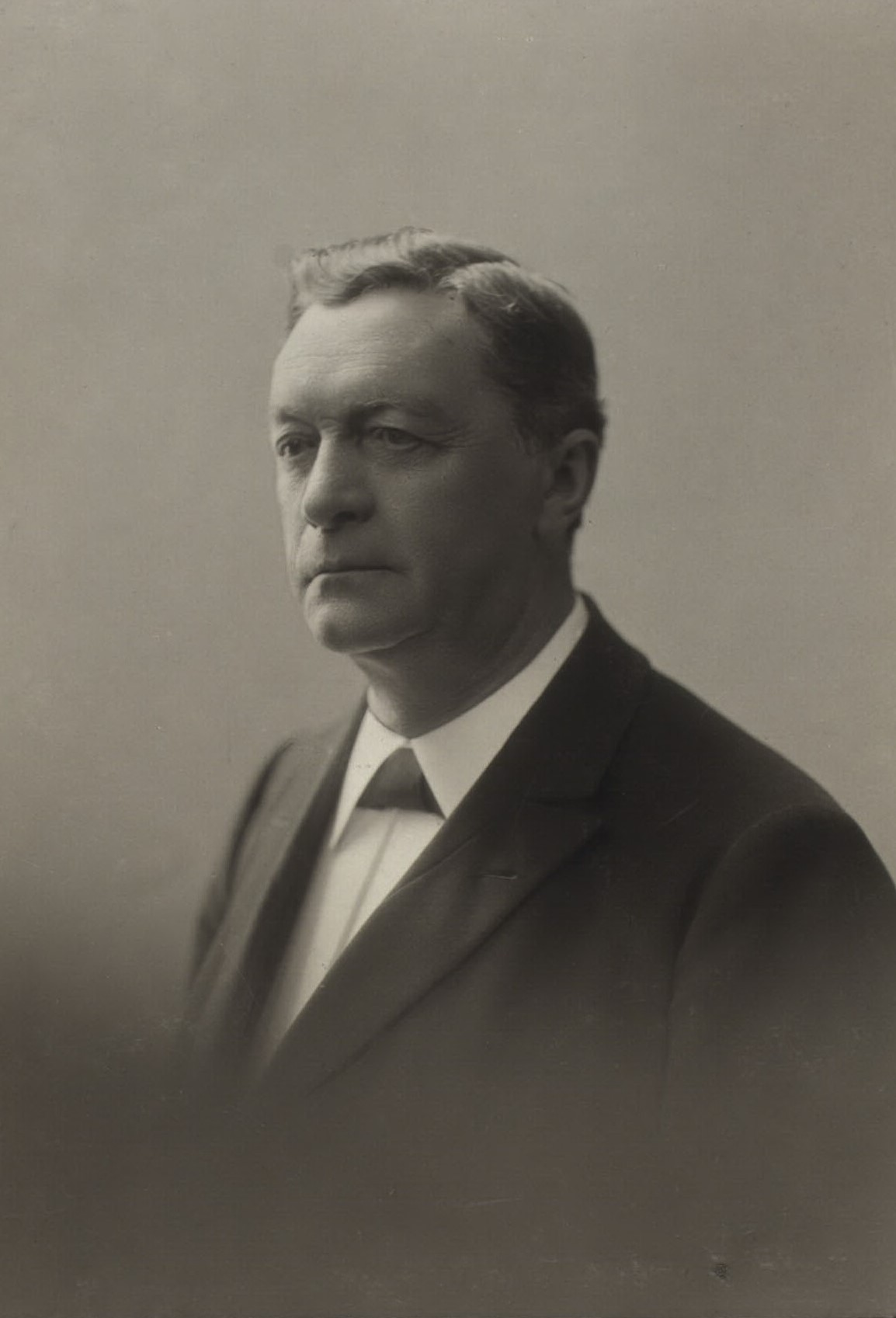
- Klaus Berntsen was in the Folketing 1873-1884 and again 1886-1926, making him the longest-serving MF of all time. Photographed in 1914 by Peter Elfelt.
- Folketing
- Abbreviation: MF
- Nominator: Political parties
- Appointer: General elections
- Term length: 4 years, renewable
- Constituting instrument: Constitution of 1953
- Formation: 5 June 1849; 177 years ago
- First holder: 1st members

Members of the Folketing (Danish: Folketingsmedlem) are members of the Danish parliament, known as the Folketing. The title is frequently shortened to the initialism MF. The term of office is up to 4 years, but usually shorter as the prime minister can call a snap election at any time before the full term is up.

Since the general election on 22 September 1953, which was the first under the Constitution of 1953, there have been 179 members of parliament in each session. 175 are elected in Denmark proper, while two each are elected in Greenland and the Faroe Islands, known collectively as the North Atlantic mandates (da). When someone ceases to be an MF, other members of their party who didn't win a seat at the most recent election are offered to take their place as substitutes, making by-elections unnecessary. The current MFs were elected in the general election on 1 November 2022

== Longest-serving members ==
The following five MFs have served the longest:

- Klaus Berntsen (51 years)
- Lars Dinesen (48 years)
- Niels Neergaard (43 years)
- Sofus Høgsbro (43 years)
- Bertel Haarder (42 years)

== See also ==
- Folketing
- List of Faroese members of the Folketing
- List of members of the Folketing, 2026–present
