= Roug =

Roug is a surname. Notable people with the surname include:

- Kasper Roug (born 1979), Danish politician
- Kristine Roug (born 1975), Danish sailor
