= Zealand (Folketing constituency) =

Constituency of the Folketing, the national legislature of Denmark

- Sjælland
- Constituency for the Folketing
- Location of Zealand within Denmark
- Municipality: List: Faxe; Greve; Guldborgsund; Holbæk; Kalundborg; Køge; Lejre; Lolland; Næstved; Odsherred; Ringsted; Roskilde; Slagelse; Solrød; Sorø; Stevns; Vordingborg
- Region: Zealand
- Population: 828,102 (2026)
- Electorate: 638,930 (2026)
- Area: 7,227 km^{2} (2022)

Current constituency
- Created: 2007
- Seats: List: 20 (2011–present); 21 (2007–2011)
- Members of the Folketing: List: Anne Valentina Berthelsen (F); Lars-Christian Brask (I); Astrid Carøe (F); Morten Dahlin (V); Kaare Dybvad (A); Louise Schack Elholm (V); Sascha Faxe (Å); Mike Villa Fonseca (M); Mette Gjerskov (A); Charlotte Bagge Hansen (M); Magnus Heunicke (A); Jacob Jensen (V); Susie Jessen (Æ); Pia Kjærsgaard (O); Brigitte Klintskov Jerkel (C); Astrid Krag (A); Rasmus Horn Langhoff (A); Trine Mach (Ø); Jacob Mark (F); Lars Løkke Rasmussen (M); Kasper Roug (A); Peter Seier Christensen (D); Sandra Elisabeth Skalvig (I); Peter Skaarup (Æ); Zenia Stampe (B); Frederik Vad (A)
- Created from: Roskilde County; Storstrøm County; West Zealand County

Zealand (Danish: Sjælland) is one of the 12 multi-member constituencies of the Folketing, the national legislature of Denmark. The constituency was established in 2007 following the public administration structural reform. It consists of the municipalities of Faxe, Greve, Guldborgsund, Holbæk, Kalundborg, Køge, Lejre, Lolland, Næstved, Odsherred, Ringsted, Roskilde, Slagelse, Solrød, Sorø, Stevns and Vordingborg. The constituency currently elects 20 of the 179 members of the Folketing using the open party-list proportional representation electoral system. At the 2026 general election it had 638,930 registered electors.

== Electoral system ==
Zealand currently elects 20 of the 179 members of the Folketing using the open party-list proportional representation electoral system. Constituency seats are allocated using the D'Hondt method. Compensatory seats are calculated based on the national vote and are allocated using the Sainte-Laguë method, initially at the provincial level and finally at the constituency level. Only parties that reach any one of three thresholds stipulated by section 77 of the Folketing (Parliamentary) Elections Act - winning at least one constituency seat; obtaining at least the Hare quota (valid votes in province/number of constituency seats in province) in two of the three provinces; or obtaining at least 2% of the national vote - compete for compensatory seats.

== Election results ==
=== Summary ===
Election	Red–Green Ø			Green Left F			Alternative Å			Social Democrats A			Social Liberals B			Venstre V			Conservative People's C			Liberal Alliance I / Y			Danish People's O		
Election	Votes	%	Seats	Votes	%	Seats	Votes	%	Seats	Votes	%	Seats	Votes	%	Seats	Votes	%	Seats	Votes	%	Seats	Votes	%	Seats	Votes	%	Seats
2026	22,197	4.25%	1	65,989	12.63%	3	10,095	1.93%	0	119,530	22.87%	5	17,576	3.36%	0	44,912	8.59%	2	31,282	5.99%	1	46,604	8.92%	2	74,790	14.31%	3
2022	17,107	3.29%	0	50,778	9.77%	2	10,121	1.95%	0	157,580	30.33%	7	12,259	2.36%	0	65,433	12.59%	3	23,560	4.53%	1	34,435	6.63%	1	22,384	4.31%	1
2019	27,272	5.24%	1	45,992	8.83%	2	10,305	1.98%	0	147,057	28.23%	7	30,354	5.83%	1	126,419	24.27%	6	30,449	5.85%	1	9,289	1.78%	0	56,697	10.89%	2
2015	35,374	6.75%	1	20,575	3.92%	1	18,202	3.47%	0	146,464	27.93%	7	16,906	3.22%	0	102,818	19.61%	4	15,083	2.88%	0	32,598	6.22%	1	134,195	25.59%	6
2011	29,959	5.63%	1	51,952	9.77%	2				133,571	25.12%	5	39,840	7.49%	1	139,888	26.30%	6	24,863	4.68%	1	23,857	4.49%	1	85,571	16.09%	3
2007	8,316	1.58%	0	67,570	12.84%	3				134,280	25.51%	6	20,721	3.94%	0	146,300	27.79%	6	44,593	8.47%	2	14,401	2.74%	0	88,140	16.74%	4

(Excludes compensatory seats)

=== Detailed ===
==== 2026 ====
Results of the 2026 general election held on 24 March 2026:

Party		Votes per nomination district												Total Votes	%	Seats		
Party		Faxe	Greve	Guld- borg- sund	Hol- bæk	Kalund- borg	Køge	Lol- land	Næst- ved	Ring- sted	Ros- kilde	Slag- else	Vord- ing- borg	Total Votes	%	Con.	Com.	Tot.
Social Democrats	A	8,343	8,974	9,933	11,097	11,687	11,042	6,787	13,086	8,521	11,419	11,697	6,944	119,530	22.87%	5	0	5
Danish People's Party	O	6,867	6,598	5,323	6,026	8,426	7,568	3,473	7,566	5,666	5,614	7,956	3,707	74,790	14.31%	3	1	4
Green Left	F	4,414	4,662	4,319	6,274	5,982	8,662	2,255	6,124	5,081	9,201	5,210	3,805	65,989	12.63%	3	0	3
Moderates	M	3,292	5,208	2,688	4,085	3,779	5,429	1,231	4,433	3,522	6,227	4,201	2,751	46,846	8.96%	2	0	2
Liberal Alliance	I	3,742	5,632	2,552	3,972	3,862	5,283	1,131	5,326	3,405	5,397	4,105	2,197	46,604	8.92%	2	1	3
Venstre	V	3,223	5,456	3,810	3,748	4,260	5,741	1,612	3,991	3,482	4,150	4,161	2,190	44,912	8.59%	2	0	2
Conservative People's Party	C	2,082	3,345	2,048	2,177	1,907	3,945	885	3,195	2,835	5,444	2,247	1,192	31,282	5.99%	1	1	2
Denmark Democrats	Æ	2,241	1,268	3,311	2,390	3,718	2,210	3,000	2,697	2,078	1,228	2,767	1,700	28,183	5.94%	1	0	1
Red–Green Alliance	Ø	1,237	1,734	1,291	2,121	1,920	2,461	696	1,943	1,984	3,530	1,864	1,416	22,197	4.25%	1	0	1
Danish Social Liberal Party	B	953	1,834	705	1,659	1,327	2,324	260	1,472	1,415	3,677	1,173	777	17,576	3.36%	0	1	1
Citizens' Party	H	1,309	823	1,233	1,301	1,857	1,211	822	1,587	1,138	874	1,452	983	14,590	2.76%	0	1	1
The Alternative	Å	712	551	599	934	1,015	1,233	344	837	879	1,537	689	765	10,095	1.93%	0	1	1
Valid votes		38,415	46,085	36,475	45,784	49,740	57,089	22,496	52,257	40,006	58,298	47,522	28,427	522,594	100.00%	20	6	26
Blank votes		411	368	437	563	607	564	239	551	506	482	557	305	5,590	1.06%			
Rejected votes – other		96	144	115	115	121	113	79	138	94	126	127	63	1,331	0.25%			
Total polled		38,922	46,597	37,027	46,462	50,468	57,766	22,814	52,946	40,606	58,906	48,206	28,795	529,515	82.88%			
Registered electors		46,452	54,721	45,798	55,837	62,188	67,707	29,652	64,228	48,652	68,082	60,670	34,943	638,930				
Turnout		83.79%	85.15%	80.85%	83.21%	81.15%	85.32%	76.94%	82.43%	83.46%	86.52%	79.46%	82.41%	82.88%				

The following candidates were elected:

- Constituency seats - Trine Birk Andersen (A), 4,106 votes; Anne Valentina Berthelsen (F), 1,782 votes; Lars-Christian Brask (I), 1,691 votes; Astrid Carøe (F), 1,895 votes; Morten Dahlin (V), 12,552 votes; Kaare Dybvad (A), 5,848 votes; Pia Olsen Dyhr (F), 29,344 votes; Eva Flyvholm (Ø), 5,514 votes; Charlotte Bagge Hansen (M), 1,909 votes; Magnus Heunicke (A), 14,316 votes; Julie Jacobsen (O), 768 votes; Jacob Jensen (V), 7,629 votes; Susie Jessen (Æ), 1,946 votes; Marcus Knuth (C), 4,394 votes; Malte Larsen (O), 1,036 votes; Morten Messerschmidt (O), 50,819 votes; Lars Løkke Rasmussen (M), 34,636 votes; Kasper Roug (A), 4,476 votes; Frederik Vad (A), 6,763 votes and Pernille Vermund (I), 5,751 votes.
- Compensatory seats - Jan Herskov (O), 460 votes; Rune Kristensen (C), 1,880 votes; Jacob Harris Nielsen (H), 2,307 votes; Joachim Riis (I), 965 votes; Zenia Stampe (B), 4,242 votes and Elise Sydendal (Å), 1,298 votes.

==== 2022 ====
Results of the 2022 general election held on 1 November 2022:

Party		Votes per nomination district												Total Votes	%	Seats		
Party		Faxe	Greve	Guld- borg- sund	Hol- bæk	Kalund- borg	Køge	Lol- land	Næst- ved	Ring- sted	Ros- kilde	Slag- else	Vord- ing- borg	Total Votes	%	Con.	Com.	Tot.
Social Democrats	A	10,876	11,176	13,620	13,954	16,459	13,939	10,437	17,084	11,246	14,143	15,038	9,608	157,580	30.33%	7	0	7
Venstre	V	4,517	8,222	3,810	5,230	6,368	7,707	2,411	5,668	4,859	6,924	6,984	2,733	65,433	12.59%	3	0	3
Moderates	M	4,117	5,784	3,443	4,876	4,951	6,457	1,773	5,584	4,142	7,218	4,653	3,328	56,326	10.84%	2	1	3
Green Left	F	3,600	3,220	3,059	5,239	4,187	7,843	1,510	4,494	3,879	7,043	3,770	2,934	50,778	9.77%	2	1	3
Denmark Democrats	Æ	3,944	2,715	3,311	3,416	5,383	3,986	2,494	4,264	3,289	2,590	4,354	2,119	41,865	8.06%	2	0	2
Liberal Alliance	I	2,462	4,222	1,693	2,922	2,573	4,209	878	3,637	2,429	4,851	2,975	1,584	34,435	6.63%	1	1	2
Conservative People's Party	C	1,756	2,265	1,460	1,678	1,591	2,748	708	2,781	2,706	3,036	1,777	1,054	23,560	4.53%	1	0	1
The New Right	D	2,107	1,653	1,521	1,853	3,185	2,090	1,054	2,568	1,807	1,585	2,331	1,236	22,990	4.42%	1	0	1
Danish People's Party	O	1,680	1,742	3,308	1,620	2,607	1,905	1,392	2,205	1,404	1,460	1,834	1,227	22,384	4.31%	1	0	1
Red–Green Alliance	Ø	1,042	936	1,111	1,537	1,764	1,763	656	1,502	1,368	2,861	1,344	1,223	17,107	3.29%	0	1	1
Danish Social Liberal Party	B	703	1,201	495	1,043	867	1,572	190	1,104	1,037	2,631	850	566	12,259	2.36%	0	1	1
The Alternative	Å	680	560	531	840	1,009	1,229	262	829	908	1,739	662	872	10,121	1.95%	0	1	1
Independent Greens	Q	68	434	92	274	139	325	46	139	244	340	382	81	2,564	0.49%	0	0	0
Christian Democrats	K	90	102	95	117	111	146	57	124	129	117	109	63	1,260	0.24%	0	0	0
Lisa Sofia Larsson (Independent)		47	19	34	34	97	36	24	40	63	34	41	51	520	0.10%	0	0	0
Rasmus Paludan (Independent)		37	19	35	32	38	26	27	42	20	30	47	33	386	0.07%	0	0	0
Valid votes		37,726	44,270	37,618	44,665	51,329	55,981	23,919	52,065	39,530	56,602	47,151	28,712	519,568	100.00%	20	6	26
Blank votes		465	440	554	629	704	666	305	677	561	656	623	409	6,689	1.27%			
Rejected votes – other		122	196	144	161	229	184	129	194	113	173	172	91	1,908	0.36%			
Total polled		38,313	44,906	38,316	45,455	52,262	56,831	24,353	52,936	40,204	57,431	47,946	29,212	528,165	83.24%			
Registered electors		45,733	52,677	46,871	54,352	63,921	66,088	31,368	63,780	48,173	66,179	60,183	35,188	634,513				
Turnout		83.78%	85.25%	81.75%	83.63%	81.76%	85.99%	77.64%	83.00%	83.46%	86.78%	79.67%	83.02%	83.24%				

Votes per municipality:

Party		Votes per municipality																	Total Votes
Party		Faxe	Greve	Guld- borg- sund	Hol- bæk	Kalund- borg	Køge	Lejre	Lol- land	Næst- ved	Odsher- red	Ring- sted	Ros- kilde	Slag- else	Sol- rød	Sorø	Stevns	Vord- ing- borg	Total Votes
Social Democrats	A	6,795	7,755	13,620	13,954	9,281	9,492	4,447	10,437	17,084	7,178	5,694	14,143	15,038	3,421	5,552	4,081	9,608	157,580
Venstre	V	2,631	5,686	3,810	5,230	4,007	5,296	2,411	2,411	5,668	2,361	2,645	6,924	6,984	2,536	2,214	1,886	2,733	65,433
Moderates	M	2,448	3,738	3,443	4,876	2,816	4,320	2,137	1,773	5,584	2,135	2,193	7,218	4,653	2,046	1,949	1,669	3,328	56,326
Green Left	F	2,083	1,977	3,059	5,239	2,322	5,380	2,463	1,510	4,494	1,865	1,970	7,043	3,770	1,243	1,909	1,517	2,934	50,778
Denmark Democrats	Æ	2,385	1,816	3,311	3,416	3,347	2,651	1,335	2,494	4,264	2,036	1,652	2,590	4,354	899	1,637	1,559	2,119	41,865
Liberal Alliance	I	1,521	2,513	1,693	2,922	1,531	2,895	1,314	878	3,637	1,042	1,296	4,851	2,975	1,709	1,133	941	1,584	34,435
Conservative People's Party	C	917	1,427	1,460	1,678	919	1,960	788	708	2,781	672	1,737	3,036	1,777	838	969	839	1,054	23,560
The New Right	D	1,331	1,100	1,521	1,853	2,091	1,363	727	1,054	2,568	1,094	900	1,585	2,331	553	907	776	1,236	22,990
Danish People's Party	O	1,053	1,171	3,308	1,620	1,507	1,281	624	1,392	2,205	1,100	710	1,460	1,834	571	694	627	1,227	22,384
Red–Green Alliance	Ø	585	656	1,111	1,537	903	954	809	656	1,502	861	727	2,861	1,344	280	641	457	1,223	17,107
Danish Social Liberal Party	B	340	811	495	1,043	501	913	659	190	1,104	366	522	2,631	850	390	515	363	566	12,259
The Alternative	Å	386	356	531	840	459	641	588	262	829	550	422	1,739	662	204	486	294	872	10,121
Independent Greens	Q	43	398	92	274	97	276	49	46	139	42	199	340	382	36	45	25	81	2,564
Christian Democrats	K	57	81	95	117	67	87	59	57	124	44	70	117	109	21	59	33	63	1,260
Lisa Sofia Larsson (Independent)		25	12	34	34	51	22	14	24	40	46	34	34	41	7	29	22	51	520
Rasmus Paludan (Independent)		25	13	35	32	26	21	5	27	42	12	9	30	47	6	11	12	33	386
Valid votes		22,625	29,510	37,618	44,665	29,925	37,552	18,429	23,919	52,065	21,404	20,780	56,602	47,151	14,760	18,750	15,101	28,712	519,568
Blank votes		297	310	554	629	368	432	234	305	677	336	290	656	623	130	271	168	409	6,689
Rejected votes – other		68	147	144	161	123	123	61	129	194	106	64	173	172	49	49	54	91	1,908
Total polled		22,990	29,967	38,316	45,455	30,416	38,107	18,724	24,353	52,936	21,846	21,134	57,431	47,946	14,939	19,070	15,323	29,212	528,165
Registered electors		27,729	35,660	46,871	54,352	37,498	44,970	21,118	31,368	63,780	26,423	25,442	66,179	60,183	17,017	22,731	18,004	35,188	634,513
Turnout		82.91%	84.04%	81.75%	83.63%	81.11%	84.74%	88.66%	77.64%	83.00%	82.68%	83.07%	86.78%	79.67%	87.79%	83.89%	85.11%	83.02%	83.24%

The following candidates were elected:

- Constituency seats - Lars-Christian Brask (I), 3,442 votes; Astrid Carøe (F), 2,111 votes; Morten Dahlin (V), 10,385 votes; Kaare Dybvad (A), 8,891 votes; Louise Schack Elholm (V), 8,975 votes; Mette Gjerskov (A), 5,244 votes; Charlotte Bagge Hansen (M), 2,187 votes; Magnus Heunicke (A), 22,102 votes; Jacob Jensen (V), 10,169 votes; Susie Jessen (Æ), 1,195 votes; Pia Kjærsgaard (O), 6,084 votes; Brigitte Klintskov Jerkel (C), 1,965 votes; Astrid Krag (A), 7,872 votes; Rasmus Horn Langhoff (A), 4,931 votes; Jacob Mark (F), 31,235 votes; Lars Løkke Rasmussen (M), 38,439 votes; Kasper Roug (A), 6,278 votes; Peter Seier Christensen (D), 2,806 votes; Peter Skaarup (Æ), 7,341 votes; and Frederik Vad (A), 5,082 votes.
- Compensatory seats - Anne Valentina Berthelsen (F), 1,383 votes; Sascha Faxe (Å), 1,129 votes; Mike Villa Fonseca (M), 505 votes; Trine Mach (Ø), 3,937 votes; Sandra Skalvig (I), 854 votes; and Zenia Stampe (B), 2,836 votes.

==== 2019 ====
Results of the 2019 general election held on 5 June 2019:

Party		Votes per nomination district												Total Votes	%	Seats		
Party		Faxe	Greve	Guld- borg- sund	Hol- bæk	Kalund- borg	Køge	Lol- land	Næst- ved	Ring- sted	Ros- kilde	Slag- else	Vord- ing- borg	Total Votes	%	Con.	Com.	Tot.
Social Democrats	A	9,793	10,606	12,995	12,772	15,072	12,661	10,000	17,409	10,270	13,225	13,478	8,776	147,057	28.23%	7	1	8
Venstre	V	9,180	13,752	8,040	10,408	12,653	14,106	5,134	11,787	9,481	12,923	12,438	6,517	126,419	24.27%	6	1	7
Danish People's Party	O	4,453	4,739	5,444	4,632	6,915	5,210	3,065	5,179	4,552	4,141	5,540	2,827	56,697	10.89%	2	1	3
Socialist People's Party	F	3,525	3,048	2,844	3,189	3,566	7,854	1,736	4,192	3,522	5,924	3,788	2,804	45,992	8.83%	2	1	3
Conservative People's Party	C	2,487	3,260	1,674	2,586	2,276	3,879	912	2,841	2,637	4,136	2,349	1,412	30,449	5.85%	1	1	2
Danish Social Liberal Party	B	1,596	3,123	1,430	2,849	2,306	3,616	632	2,411	2,510	5,441	2,626	1,814	30,354	5.83%	1	1	2
Red–Green Alliance	Ø	1,793	1,549	1,815	2,667	3,006	2,474	1,234	2,372	2,230	3,752	2,410	1,970	27,272	5.24%	1	1	2
Hard Line	P	1,221	995	1,102	1,102	1,827	1,195	830	1,380	1,039	937	1,608	818	14,054	2.70%	0	0	0
The New Right	D	1,078	1,255	847	975	1,489	1,488	588	1,355	989	1,116	1,455	684	13,319	2.56%	0	1	1
The Alternative	Å	663	654	614	934	980	1,073	273	900	858	1,675	859	822	10,305	1.98%	0	1	1
Liberal Alliance	I	662	1,184	432	884	630	1,128	241	956	712	1,360	745	355	9,289	1.78%	0	0	0
Klaus Riskær Pedersen	E	471	386	407	540	597	542	213	507	411	520	458	277	5,329	1.02%	0	0	0
Christian Democrats	K	305	355	326	377	394	474	171	394	363	462	349	201	4,171	0.80%	0	0	0
Pinki Karin Yvonne Jensen (Independent)		6	6	5	49	21	7	3	7	18	10	15	15	162	0.03%	0	0	0
Valid votes		37,233	44,912	37,975	43,964	51,732	55,707	25,032	51,690	39,592	55,622	48,118	29,292	520,869	100.00%	20	9	29
Blank votes		316	245	359	350	428	431	218	383	299	407	408	274	4,118	0.78%			
Rejected votes – other		96	155	145	140	210	135	77	130	119	172	100	77	1,556	0.30%			
Total polled		37,645	45,312	38,479	44,454	52,370	56,273	25,327	52,203	40,010	56,201	48,626	29,643	526,543	83.72%			
Registered electors		44,862	52,157	47,446	52,991	63,878	64,780	32,741	62,805	47,539	64,331	59,710	35,670	628,910				
Turnout		83.91%	86.88%	81.10%	83.89%	81.98%	86.87%	77.36%	83.12%	84.16%	87.36%	81.44%	83.10%	83.72%				

Votes per municipality:

Party		Votes per municipality																	Total Votes
Party		Faxe	Greve	Guld- borg- sund	Hol- bæk	Kalund- borg	Køge	Lejre	Lol- land	Næst- ved	Odsher- red	Ring- sted	Ros- kilde	Slag- else	Sol- rød	Sorø	Stevns	Vord- ing- borg	Total Votes
Social Democrats	A	6,270	7,504	12,995	12,772	8,543	8,573	4,088	10,000	17,409	6,529	5,384	13,225	13,478	3,102	4,886	3,523	8,776	147,057
Venstre	V	5,494	9,194	8,040	10,408	7,752	9,416	4,690	5,134	11,787	4,901	5,121	12,923	12,438	4,558	4,360	3,686	6,517	126,419
Danish People's Party	O	2,779	3,312	5,444	4,632	4,109	3,498	1,712	3,065	5,179	2,806	2,425	4,141	5,540	1,427	2,127	1,674	2,827	56,697
Socialist People's Party	F	1,971	1,977	2,844	3,189	2,094	5,855	1,999	1,736	4,192	1,472	1,867	5,924	3,788	1,071	1,655	1,554	2,804	45,992
Conservative People's Party	C	1,375	1,955	1,674	2,586	1,238	2,683	1,196	912	2,841	1,038	1,345	4,136	2,349	1,305	1,292	1,112	1,412	30,449
Danish Social Liberal Party	B	888	2,095	1,430	2,849	1,320	2,287	1,329	632	2,411	986	1,394	5,441	2,626	1,028	1,116	708	1,814	30,354
Red–Green Alliance	Ø	1,052	1,128	1,815	2,667	1,605	1,430	1,044	1,234	2,372	1,401	1,176	3,752	2,410	421	1,054	741	1,970	27,272
Hard Line	P	800	688	1,102	1,102	1,201	855	340	830	1,380	626	510	937	1,608	307	529	421	818	14,054
The New Right	D	687	860	847	975	961	999	489	588	1,355	528	512	1,116	1,455	395	477	391	684	13,319
The Alternative	Å	423	443	614	934	476	573	500	273	900	504	436	1,675	859	211	422	240	822	10,305
Liberal Alliance	I	380	694	432	884	381	742	386	241	956	249	412	1,360	745	490	300	282	355	9,289
Klaus Riskær Pedersen	E	291	244	407	540	305	340	202	213	507	292	205	520	458	142	206	180	277	5,329
Christian Democrats	K	194	259	326	377	231	290	184	171	394	163	143	462	349	96	220	111	201	4,171
Pinki Karin Yvonne Jensen (Independent)		4	4	5	49	11	6	1	3	7	10	9	10	15	2	9	2	15	162
Valid votes		22,608	30,357	37,975	43,964	30,227	37,547	18,160	25,032	51,690	21,505	20,939	55,622	48,118	14,555	18,653	14,625	29,292	520,869
Blank votes		215	146	359	350	246	293	138	218	383	182	164	407	408	99	135	101	274	4,118
Rejected votes – other		66	118	145	140	136	84	51	77	130	74	55	172	100	37	64	30	77	1,556
Total polled		22,889	30,621	38,479	44,454	30,609	37,924	18,349	25,327	52,203	21,761	21,158	56,201	48,626	14,691	18,852	14,756	29,643	526,543
Registered electors		27,485	35,535	47,446	52,991	37,478	44,170	20,610	32,741	62,805	26,400	25,053	64,331	59,710	16,622	22,486	17,377	35,670	628,910
Turnout		83.28%	86.17%	81.10%	83.89%	81.67%	85.86%	89.03%	77.36%	83.12%	82.43%	84.45%	87.36%	81.44%	88.38%	83.84%	84.92%	83.10%	83.72%

The following candidates were elected:

- Constituency seats - Astrid Carøe (F), 2,550 votes; René Christensen (O), 5,175 votes; Morten Dahlin (V), 9,269 votes; Lennart Damsbo-Andersen (A), 9,615 votes; Kaare Dybvad (A), 10,742 votes; Søren Espersen (O), 5,930 votes; Mette Gjerskov (A), 10,470 votes; Bertel Haarder (V), 7,736 votes; Magnus Heunicke (A), 29,062 votes; Jacob Jensen (V), 10,523 votes; Christian Juhl (Ø), 4,644 votes; Naser Khader (C), 13,579 votes; Astrid Krag (A), 34,077 votes; Marcus Knuth (V), 12,931 votes; Stén Knuth (V), 6,736 votes; Rasmus Horn Langhoff (A), 10,788 votes; Jacob Mark (F), 23,213 votes; Lars Løkke Rasmussen (V), 58,643 votes; Kasper Roug (A), 8,602 votes; and Zenia Stampe (B), 8,371 votes.
- Compensatory seats - Anne Valentina Berthelsen (F), 1,304 votes; Liselott Blixt (O), 2,427 votes; Louise Schack Elholm (V), 6,058 votes; Eva Flyvholm (Ø), 7,325 votes; Brigitte Klintskov Jerkel (C), 6,528 votes; Henrik Sass Larsen (A), 8,275 votes; Rasmus Nordqvist (Å), 1,499 votes; Kathrine Olldag (B), 1,595 votes; and Peter Seier Christensen (D), 1,850 votes.

==== 2015 ====
Results of the 2015 general election held on 18 June 2015:

Party		Votes per nomination district												Total Votes	%	Seats		
Party		Faxe	Greve	Guld- borg- sund	Hol- bæk	Kalund- borg	Køge	Lol- land	Næst- ved	Ring- sted	Ros- kilde	Slag- else	Vord- ing- borg	Total Votes	%	Con.	Com.	Tot.
Social Democrats	A	9,297	10,561	12,657	12,173	14,514	13,784	9,679	17,230	10,310	14,087	13,197	8,975	146,464	27.93%	7	1	8
Danish People's Party	O	10,660	11,499	11,534	10,167	15,623	13,045	7,024	12,914	10,512	10,114	13,577	7,526	134,195	25.59%	6	1	7
Venstre	V	7,621	10,847	6,760	8,666	10,333	11,758	4,494	9,357	7,703	10,339	9,298	5,642	102,818	19.61%	4	1	5
Red–Green Alliance	Ø	2,324	2,091	2,853	3,414	3,728	3,236	2,019	3,278	2,684	4,148	3,253	2,346	35,374	6.75%	1	1	2
Liberal Alliance	I	2,337	4,009	1,501	2,650	2,449	3,957	802	3,438	2,493	4,456	3,052	1,454	32,598	6.22%	1	0	1
Socialist People's Party	F	1,489	1,215	1,319	1,447	1,691	3,498	1,111	1,690	1,532	2,920	1,562	1,101	20,575	3.92%	1	0	1
The Alternative	Å	1,195	1,028	1,097	1,563	1,916	1,860	646	1,573	1,545	2,838	1,464	1,477	18,202	3.47%	0	1	1
Danish Social Liberal Party	B	934	1,506	791	1,901	1,312	2,097	365	1,175	1,402	3,257	1,432	734	16,906	3.22%	0	1	1
Conservative People's Party	C	1,212	1,353	933	1,357	1,191	1,613	935	1,526	1,300	1,780	1,151	732	15,083	2.88%	0	1	1
Christian Democrats	K	133	149	190	182	145	184	80	235	193	234	182	89	1,996	0.38%	0	0	0
Aamer Ahmad (Independent)		9	19	8	10	11	18	9	10	7	13	13	9	136	0.03%	0	0	0
Michael Christiansen (Independent)		10	1	6	1	5	13	2	8	3	2	3	4	58	0.01%	0	0	0
Bent A. Jespersen (Independent)		1	0	1	0	4	2	2	1	6	3	3	2	25	0.00%	0	0	0
Valid votes		37,222	44,278	39,650	43,531	52,922	55,065	27,168	52,435	39,690	54,191	48,187	30,091	524,430	100.00%	20	7	27
Blank votes		281	301	354	368	409	469	224	440	355	507	441	252	4,401	0.83%			
Rejected votes – other		141	137	152	148	182	196	108	144	105	217	124	97	1,751	0.33%			
Total polled		37,644	44,716	40,156	44,047	53,513	55,730	27,500	53,019	40,150	54,915	48,752	30,440	530,582	85.74%			
Registered electors		43,596	50,763	47,693	51,506	63,408	63,228	33,835	61,884	46,557	62,392	58,576	35,369	618,807				
Turnout		86.35%	88.09%	84.20%	85.52%	84.39%	88.14%	81.28%	85.67%	86.24%	88.02%	83.23%	86.06%	85.74%				

Votes per municipality:

Party		Votes per municipality																	Total Votes
Party		Faxe	Greve	Guld- borg- sund	Hol- bæk	Kalund- borg	Køge	Lejre	Lol- land	Næst- ved	Odsher- red	Ring- sted	Ros- kilde	Slag- else	Sol- rød	Sorø	Stevns	Vord- ing- borg	Total Votes
Social Democrats	A	5,666	7,377	12,657	12,173	8,238	9,517	4,267	9,679	17,230	6,276	5,474	14,087	13,197	3,184	4,836	3,631	8,975	146,464
Danish People's Party	O	6,516	8,170	11,534	10,167	9,574	9,175	3,870	7,024	12,914	6,049	5,586	10,114	13,577	3,329	4,926	4,144	7,526	134,195
Venstre	V	4,609	7,355	6,760	8,666	6,204	7,707	4,051	4,494	9,357	4,129	4,062	10,339	9,298	3,492	3,641	3,012	5,642	102,818
Red–Green Alliance	Ø	1,446	1,503	2,853	3,414	2,079	2,069	1,167	2,019	3,278	1,649	1,421	4,148	3,253	588	1,263	878	2,346	35,374
Liberal Alliance	I	1,458	2,453	1,501	2,650	1,488	2,675	1,282	802	3,438	961	1,420	4,456	3,052	1,556	1,073	879	1,454	32,598
Socialist People's Party	F	888	812	1,319	1,447	994	2,428	1,070	1,111	1,690	697	740	2,920	1,562	403	792	601	1,101	20,575
The Alternative	Å	676	679	1,097	1,563	938	1,021	839	646	1,573	978	771	2,838	1,464	349	774	519	1,477	18,202
Danish Social Liberal Party	B	569	998	791	1,901	763	1,310	787	365	1,175	549	758	3,257	1,432	508	644	365	734	16,906
Conservative People's Party	C	686	889	933	1,357	647	1,109	504	935	1,526	544	534	1,780	1,151	464	766	526	732	15,083
Christian Democrats	K	81	119	190	182	93	115	69	80	235	52	74	234	182	30	119	52	89	1,996
Aamer Ahmad (Independent)		4	15	8	10	3	12	6	9	10	8	4	13	13	4	3	5	9	136
Michael Christiansen (Independent)		8	1	6	1	4	11	2	2	8	1	1	2	3	0	2	2	4	58
Bent A. Jespersen (Independent)		1	0	1	0	2	1	1	2	1	2	1	3	3	0	5	0	2	25
Valid votes		22,608	30,371	39,650	43,531	31,027	37,150	17,915	27,168	52,435	21,895	20,846	54,191	48,187	13,907	18,844	14,614	30,091	524,430
Blank votes		171	204	354	368	226	318	151	224	440	183	188	507	441	97	167	110	252	4,401
Rejected votes – other		89	90	152	148	126	139	57	108	144	56	60	217	124	47	45	52	97	1,751
Total polled		22,868	30,665	40,156	44,047	31,379	37,607	18,123	27,500	53,019	22,134	21,094	54,915	48,752	14,051	19,056	14,776	30,440	530,582
Registered electors		26,706	35,105	47,693	51,506	37,308	43,192	20,036	33,835	61,884	26,100	24,430	62,392	58,576	15,658	22,127	16,890	35,369	618,807
Turnout		85.63%	87.35%	84.20%	85.52%	84.11%	87.07%	90.45%	81.28%	85.67%	84.80%	86.34%	88.02%	83.23%	89.74%	86.12%	87.48%	86.06%	85.74%

The following candidates were elected:

- Constituency seats - Liselott Blixt (O), 19,248 votes; Henrik Brodersen (O), 7,657 votes; René Christensen (O), 15,037 votes; Villum Christensen (I), 9,137 votes; Lennart Damsbo-Andersen (A), 9,821 votes; Kaare Dybvad (A), 7,774 votes; Søren Espersen (O), 42,873 votes; Bertel Haarder (V), 7,902 votes; Magnus Heunicke (A), 27,538 votes; Jacob Jensen (V), 8,509 votes; Christian Juhl (Ø), 4,757 votes; Astrid Krag (A), 27,520 votes; Marcus Knuth (V), 9,986 votes; Rasmus Horn Langhoff (A), 10,650 votes; Henrik Sass Larsen (A), 13,474 votes; Merete Dea Larsen (O), 10,816 votes; Jacob Mark (F), 5,820 votes; Karin Nødgaard (O), 12,542 votes; Lars Løkke Rasmussen (V), 49,265 votes; and Pernille Rosenkrantz-Theil (A), 21,121 votes.
- Compensatory seats - Louise Schack Elholm (V), 4,743 votes; Eva Flyvholm (Ø), 5,135 votes; Mette Gjerskov (A), 7,465 votes; Jeppe Jakobsen (O), 6,801 votes; Brian Mikkelsen (C), 7,044 votes; Rasmus Nordqvist (Å), 6,362 votes; and Zenia Stampe (B), 8,237 votes.

==== 2011 ====
Results of the 2011 general election held on 15 September 2011:

Party		Votes per nomination district												Total Votes	%	Seats		
Party		Faxe	Greve	Guld- borg- sund	Hol- bæk	Kalund- borg	Køge	Lol- land	Næst- ved	Ring- sted	Ros- kilde	Slag- else	Vord- ing- borg	Total Votes	%	Con.	Com.	Tot.
Venstre	V	10,749	15,049	9,627	11,657	14,257	15,259	5,802	13,059	10,673	13,788	12,642	7,326	139,888	26.30%	6	1	7
Social Democrats	A	8,501	8,662	13,097	11,449	13,443	11,711	9,279	15,208	9,716	11,498	12,645	8,362	133,571	25.12%	5	2	7
Danish People's Party	O	6,744	7,327	6,606	6,396	10,456	8,580	4,544	8,092	6,418	6,523	9,038	4,847	85,571	16.09%	3	1	4
Socialist People's Party	F	3,249	2,810	4,262	4,071	5,207	4,990	5,440	4,706	3,556	5,605	4,780	3,276	51,952	9.77%	2	0	2
Danish Social Liberal Party	B	2,734	3,410	2,328	3,712	3,454	4,729	1,255	3,546	3,253	6,327	3,009	2,083	39,840	7.49%	1	1	2
Red–Green Alliance	Ø	1,966	1,668	2,325	2,713	3,181	2,939	1,583	2,763	2,296	3,680	2,681	2,164	29,959	5.63%	1	1	2
Conservative People's Party	C	1,972	2,576	1,603	2,146	1,786	2,831	961	2,797	1,828	3,028	1,999	1,336	24,863	4.68%	1	0	1
Liberal Alliance	I	1,675	2,586	1,284	1,890	1,784	2,966	814	2,282	1,951	3,149	2,246	1,230	23,857	4.49%	1	0	1
Christian Democrats	K	116	116	197	191	205	167	92	264	185	205	171	113	2,022	0.38%	0	0	0
Johan Isbrandt Haulik (Independent)		9	3	14	11	10	9	12	14	12	12	9	9	124	0.02%	0	0	0
Peter Lotinga (Independent)		2	1	1	6	11	0	3	6	7	4	72	3	116	0.02%	0	0	0
Bent A. Jespersen (Independent)		0	1	1	2	4	4	3	3	13	0	5	2	38	0.01%	0	0	0
Valid votes		37,717	44,209	41,345	44,244	53,798	54,185	29,788	52,740	39,908	53,819	49,297	30,751	531,801	100.00%	20	6	26
Blank votes		292	242	296	299	382	369	209	368	298	347	334	220	3,656	0.68%			
Rejected votes – other		103	182	146	94	139	216	153	160	83	209	132	96	1,713	0.32%			
Total polled		38,112	44,633	41,787	44,637	54,319	54,770	30,150	53,268	40,289	54,375	49,763	31,067	537,170	87.75%			
Registered electors		43,164	49,416	48,364	51,088	62,955	60,919	35,795	60,856	45,747	60,344	58,086	35,430	612,164				
Turnout		88.30%	90.32%	86.40%	87.37%	86.28%	89.91%	84.23%	87.53%	88.07%	90.11%	85.67%	87.69%	87.75%				

Votes per municipality:

Party		Votes per municipality																	Total Votes
Party		Faxe	Greve	Guld- borg- sund	Hol- bæk	Kalund- borg	Køge	Lejre	Lol- land	Næst- ved	Odsher- red	Ring- sted	Ros- kilde	Slag- else	Sol- rød	Sorø	Stevns	Vord- ing- borg	Total Votes
Venstre	V	6,486	10,192	9,627	11,657	8,394	9,905	5,354	5,802	13,059	5,863	5,550	13,788	12,642	4,857	5,123	4,263	7,326	139,888
Social Democrats	A	5,352	6,102	13,097	11,449	7,872	8,309	3,402	9,279	15,208	5,571	5,163	11,498	12,645	2,560	4,553	3,149	8,362	133,571
Danish People's Party	O	4,027	5,253	6,606	6,396	6,428	6,112	2,468	4,544	8,092	4,028	3,403	6,523	9,038	2,074	3,015	2,717	4,847	85,571
Socialist People's Party	F	2,030	1,939	4,262	4,071	3,152	3,183	1,807	5,440	4,706	2,055	1,760	5,605	4,780	871	1,796	1,219	3,276	51,952
Danish Social Liberal Party	B	1,646	2,358	2,328	3,712	1,934	2,957	1,772	1,255	3,546	1,520	1,678	6,327	3,009	1,052	1,575	1,088	2,083	39,840
Red–Green Alliance	Ø	1,201	1,130	2,325	2,713	1,640	1,957	982	1,583	2,763	1,541	1,258	3,680	2,681	538	1,038	765	2,164	29,959
Conservative People's Party	C	1,190	1,726	1,603	2,146	1,006	1,953	878	961	2,797	780	853	3,028	1,999	850	975	782	1,336	24,863
Liberal Alliance	I	988	1,677	1,284	1,890	1,076	1,883	1,083	814	2,282	708	1,049	3,149	2,246	909	902	687	1,230	23,857
Christian Democrats	K	79	90	197	191	130	103	64	92	264	75	67	205	171	26	118	37	113	2,022
Johan Isbrandt Haulik (Independent)		4	2	14	11	6	6	3	12	14	4	6	12	9	1	6	5	9	124
Peter Lotinga (Independent)		2	1	1	6	9	0	0	3	6	2	3	4	72	0	4	0	3	116
Bent A. Jespersen (Independent)		0	1	1	2	2	2	2	3	3	2	7	0	5	0	6	0	2	38
Valid votes		23,005	30,471	41,345	44,244	31,649	36,370	17,815	29,788	52,740	22,149	20,797	53,819	49,297	13,738	19,111	14,712	30,751	531,801
Blank votes		178	167	296	299	226	229	140	209	368	156	158	347	334	75	140	114	220	3,656
Rejected votes – other		79	115	146	94	89	163	53	153	160	50	55	209	132	67	28	24	96	1,713
Total polled		23,262	30,753	41,787	44,637	31,964	36,762	18,008	30,150	53,268	22,355	21,010	54,375	49,763	13,880	19,279	14,850	31,067	537,170
Registered electors		26,476	34,270	48,364	51,088	37,150	41,299	19,620	35,795	60,856	25,805	23,807	60,344	58,086	15,146	21,940	16,688	35,430	612,164
Turnout		87.86%	89.74%	86.40%	87.37%	86.04%	89.01%	91.78%	84.23%	87.53%	86.63%	88.25%	90.11%	85.67%	91.64%	87.87%	88.99%	87.69%	87.75%

The following candidates were elected:

- Constituency seats - René Christensen (O), 3,621 votes; Villum Christensen (I), 11,929 votes; Lennart Damsbo-Andersen (A), 12,037 votes; Louise Schack Elholm (V), 12,033 votes; Mette Gjerskov (A), 13,593 votes; Bertel Haarder (V), 27,486 votes; Ole Hækkerup (A), 13,704 votes; Magnus Heunicke (A), 17,242 votes; Henrik Høegh (V), 14,079 votes; Birthe Rønn Hornbech (V), 10,708 votes; Jacob Jensen (V), 20,289 votes; Christian Juhl (Ø), 4,131 votes; Pia Kjærsgaard (O), 68,612 votes; Astrid Krag (F), 15,125 votes; Henrik Sass Larsen (A), 17,569 votes; Brian Mikkelsen (C), 9,044 votes; Karin Nødgaard (O), 2,378 votes; Karsten Nonbo (V), 15,984 votes; Ole Sohn (F), 11,181 votes; and Zenia Stampe (B), 13,589 votes.
- Compensatory seats - Liselott Blixt (O), 2,026 votes; Rasmus Horn Langhoff (A), 11,172 votes; Flemming Damgaard Larsen (V), 9,894 votes; John Dyrby Paulsen (A), 11,278 votes; Rasmus Helveg Petersen (B), 12,780 votes; and Nikolaj Villumsen (Ø), 2,849 votes.

==== 2007 ====
Results of the 2007 general election held on 13 November 2007:

Party		Votes per nomination district												Total Votes	%	Seats		
Party		Faxe	Greve	Guld- borg- sund	Hol- bæk	Kalund- borg	Køge	Lol- land	Næst- ved	Ring- sted	Ros- kilde	Slag- else	Vord- ing- borg	Total Votes	%	Con.	Com.	Tot.
Venstre	V	11,007	15,390	10,829	11,931	14,921	15,506	7,014	13,430	11,071	13,637	13,335	8,229	146,300	27.79%	6	2	8
Social Democrats	A	8,966	9,193	12,852	11,075	13,155	13,145	7,940	15,339	9,738	12,249	12,633	7,995	134,280	25.51%	6	1	7
Danish People's Party	O	6,461	7,354	7,103	6,620	10,823	8,562	5,234	8,305	6,441	6,534	9,654	5,049	88,140	16.74%	4	1	5
Socialist People's Party	F	4,138	3,608	5,305	5,468	6,704	6,090	8,032	6,012	4,552	7,313	5,834	4,514	67,570	12.84%	3	0	3
Conservative People's Party	C	3,555	4,221	2,913	3,809	3,525	4,957	1,503	5,110	3,338	5,608	3,682	2,372	44,593	8.47%	2	0	2
Danish Social Liberal Party	B	1,382	1,584	1,274	2,286	2,134	2,292	524	1,788	1,593	3,234	1,402	1,228	20,721	3.94%	0	1	1
New Alliance	Y	992	1,425	843	1,300	1,302	1,703	402	1,313	1,199	2,029	1,166	727	14,401	2.74%	0	1	1
Unity List	Ø	512	445	577	781	804	840	362	674	591	1,434	654	642	8,316	1.58%	0	1	1
Christian Democrats	K	151	155	163	202	176	205	76	229	204	268	182	104	2,115	0.40%	0	0	0
Valid votes		37,164	43,375	41,859	43,472	53,544	53,300	31,087	52,200	38,727	52,306	48,542	30,860	526,436	100.00%	21	7	28
Blank votes		177	130	226	199	264	237	129	238	193	195	202	150	2,340	0.44%			
Rejected votes – other		58	91	148	56	108	154	131	108	70	138	78	117	1,257	0.24%			
Total polled		37,399	43,596	42,233	43,727	53,916	53,691	31,347	52,546	38,990	52,639	48,822	31,127	530,033	86.84%			
Registered electors		42,920	48,920	49,243	50,415	63,188	60,238	37,618	60,654	44,794	58,847	57,783	35,723	610,343				
Turnout		87.14%	89.12%	85.76%	86.73%	85.33%	89.13%	83.33%	86.63%	87.04%	89.45%	84.49%	87.13%	86.84%				

Votes per municipality:

Party		Votes per municipality																	Total Votes
Party		Faxe	Greve	Guld- borg- sund	Hol- bæk	Kalund- borg	Køge	Lejre	Lol- land	Næst- ved	Odsher- red	Ring- sted	Ros- kilde	Slag- else	Sol- rød	Sorø	Stevns	Vord- ing- borg	Total Votes
Venstre	V	6,631	10,416	10,829	11,931	8,789	9,956	5,550	7,014	13,430	6,132	5,663	13,637	13,335	4,974	5,408	4,376	8,229	146,300
Social Democrats	A	5,433	6,577	12,852	11,075	7,753	9,283	3,862	7,940	15,339	5,402	5,194	12,249	12,633	2,616	4,544	3,533	7,995	134,280
Danish People's Party	O	3,940	5,298	7,103	6,620	6,766	6,058	2,504	5,234	8,305	4,057	3,367	6,534	9,654	2,056	3,074	2,521	5,049	88,140
Socialist People's Party	F	2,535	2,464	5,305	5,468	3,826	4,034	2,056	8,032	6,012	2,878	2,321	7,313	5,834	1,144	2,231	1,603	4,514	67,570
Conservative People's Party	C	2,180	2,820	2,913	3,809	2,053	3,377	1,580	1,503	5,110	1,472	1,667	5,608	3,682	1,401	1,671	1,375	2,372	44,593
Danish Social Liberal Party	B	862	1,086	1,274	2,286	1,221	1,348	944	524	1,788	913	813	3,234	1,402	498	780	520	1,228	20,721
New Alliance	Y	582	948	843	1,300	709	1,071	632	402	1,313	593	643	2,029	1,166	477	556	410	727	14,401
Unity List	Ø	318	308	577	781	419	515	325	362	674	385	291	1,434	654	137	300	194	642	8,316
Christian Democrats	K	106	123	163	202	124	125	80	76	229	52	67	268	182	32	137	45	104	2,115
Valid votes		22,587	30,040	41,859	43,472	31,660	35,767	17,533	31,087	52,200	21,884	20,026	52,306	48,542	13,335	18,701	14,577	30,860	526,436
Blank votes		117	92	226	199	145	161	76	129	238	119	100	195	202	38	93	60	150	2,340
Rejected votes – other		32	67	148	56	68	104	50	131	108	40	34	138	78	24	36	26	117	1,257
Total polled		22,736	30,199	42,233	43,727	31,873	36,032	17,659	31,347	52,546	22,043	20,160	52,639	48,822	13,397	18,830	14,663	31,127	530,033
Registered electors		26,353	34,007	49,243	50,415	37,393	40,892	19,346	37,618	60,654	25,795	23,190	58,847	57,783	14,913	21,604	16,567	35,723	610,343
Turnout		86.27%	88.80%	85.76%	86.73%	85.24%	88.12%	91.28%	83.33%	86.63%	85.45%	86.93%	89.45%	84.49%	89.83%	87.16%	88.51%	87.13%	86.84%

The following candidates were elected:

- Constituency seats - Thomas Adelskov (A), 14,499 votes; Flemming Bonne (F), 12,222 votes; Colette Brix (O), 2,344 votes; Henrik Brodersen (O), 1,896 votes; Troels Christensen (V), 6,927 votes; Mia Falkenberg (O), 2,359 votes; Mette Gjerskov (A), 15,566 votes; Ole Hækkerup (A), 11,594 votes; Magnus Heunicke (A), 17,753 votes; Henrik Høegh (V), 11,147 votes; Birthe Rønn Hornbech (V), 12,997 votes; Jacob Jensen (V), 9,543 votes; Pia Kjærsgaard (O), 74,985 votes; Astrid Krag (F), 9,583 votes; Henrik Sass Larsen (A), 24,140 votes; Brian Mikkelsen (C), 12,404 votes; Helge Adam Møller (C), 15,780 votes; Karsten Nonbo (V), 6,919 votes; John Dyrby Paulsen (A), 11,405 votes; Anders Fogh Rasmussen (V), 83,038 votes; and Ole Sohn (F), 23,794 votes.
- Compensatory seats - Simon Emil Ammitzbøll (B), 5,363 votes; Line Barfod (Ø), 3,912 votes; Liselott Blixt (O), 1,553 votes; Lennart Damsbo-Andersen (A), 10,608 votes; Louise Schack Elholm (V), 4,222 votes; Flemming Damgaard Larsen (V), 4,296 votes; and Gitte Seeberg (Y), 10,939 votes.
