= Eva Flyvholm =

Danish politician (born 1981)

Member of the Folketing
- Incumbent
- Assumed office 18 June 2015
- Constituency: Zealand

Personal details
- Born: 18 April 1981 (age 45) Nykøbing Falster, Denmark
- Party: Red-Green Alliance

Eva Flyvholm (born 18 April 1981 in Nykøbing Falster) is a Danish politician, who is a member of the Folketing for the Red-Green Alliance political party. She was elected into parliament at the 2015 Danish general election.

== Political career ==
Flyvholm was elected into parliament in the 2015 election, receiving 2,651 votes. She was elected again in 2019 with 3,740 votes.
