= Anne Valentina Berthelsen =

Danish politician (born 1994)

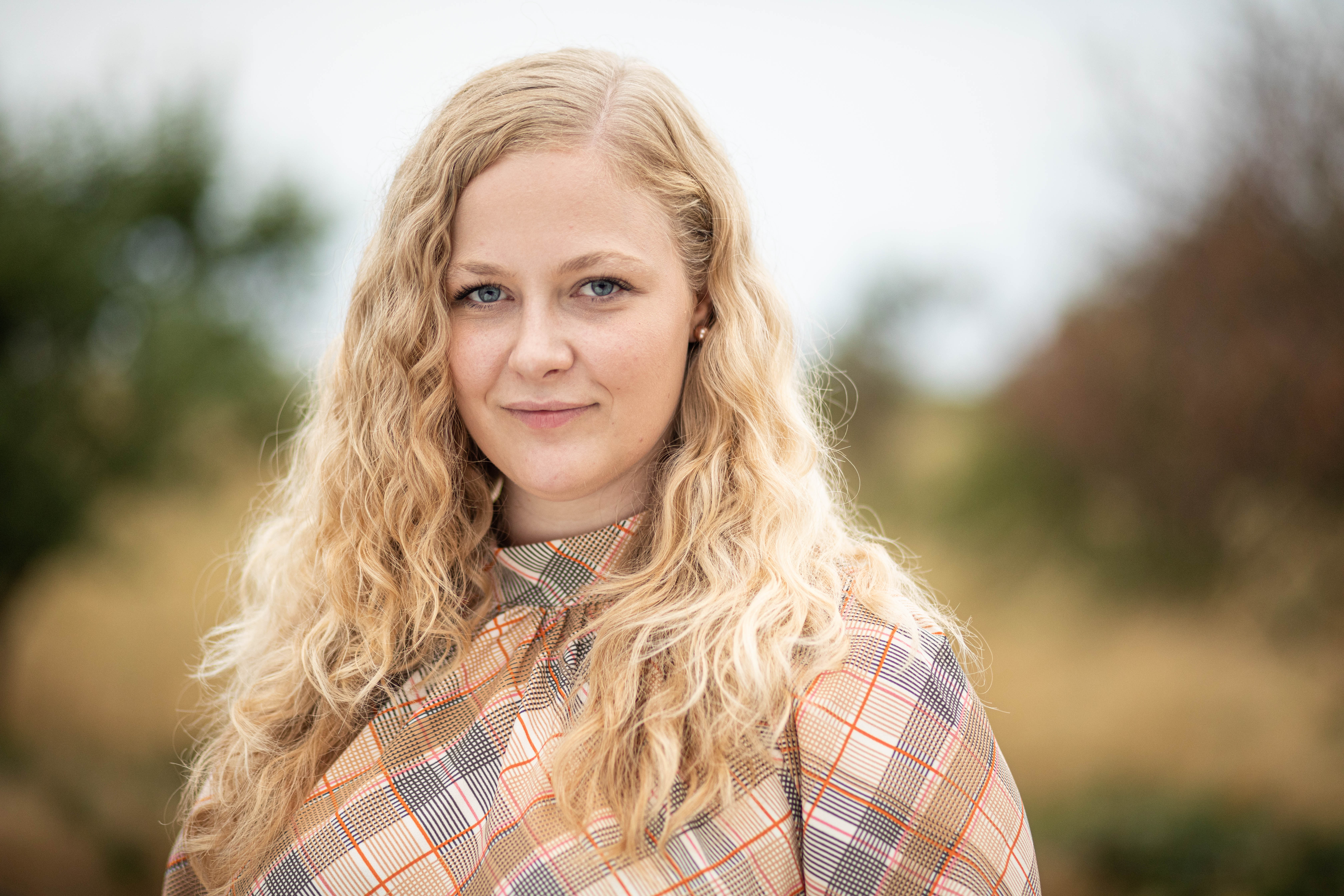
- Berthelsen in 2019

Member of the Folketing
- Incumbent
- Assumed office 5 June 2019
- Constituency: Zealand

Personal details
- Born: 16 September 1994 (age 31) Hørsholm, Denmark
- Party: Socialist People's Party

Anne Valentina Berthelsen (born 16 September 1994) is a Danish politician, who is a member of the Folketing for the Socialist People's Party. She was elected into the Folketing in the 2019 Danish general election.

== Political career ==
Berthelsen first ran for parliament in the 2019 election, where she received 1,304 votes. This was enough for her to gain one of the Socialist People's Party's levelling seats.
