= Rune Kristensen =

Danish politician (born 1982)

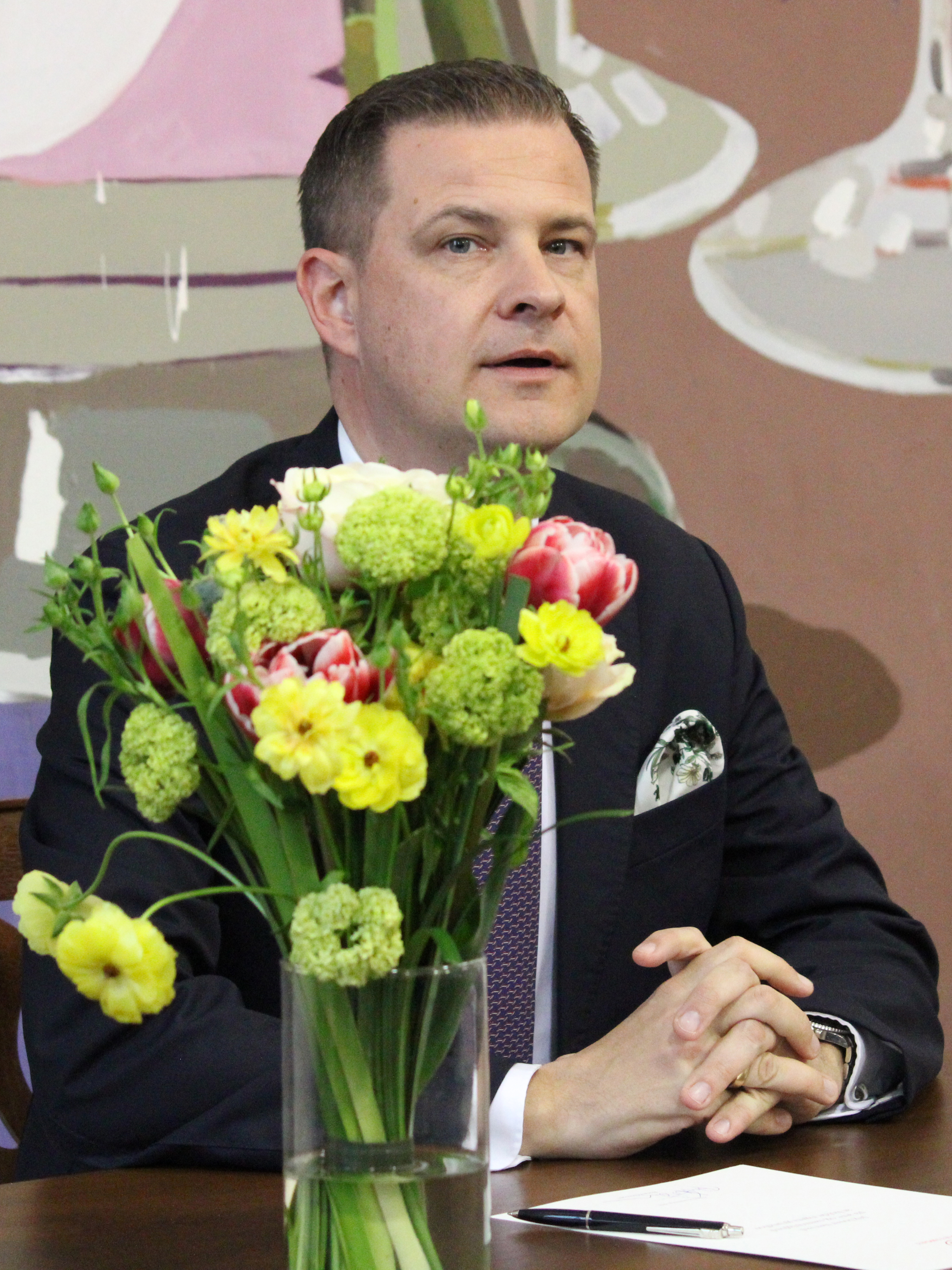
- Kristensen in 2026

Member of the Folketing
- Incumbent
- Assumed office 24 March 2026
- Constituency: Zealand

Personal details
- Born: 7 April 1982 (age 44)
- Party: Conservative People's Party

Rune Kristensen (born 7 April 1982) is a Danish politician who was elected member of the Folketing in 2026. He has served as first deputy mayor of Næstved since 2026. From 2007 to 2010, he served as chairman of the Young Conservatives.

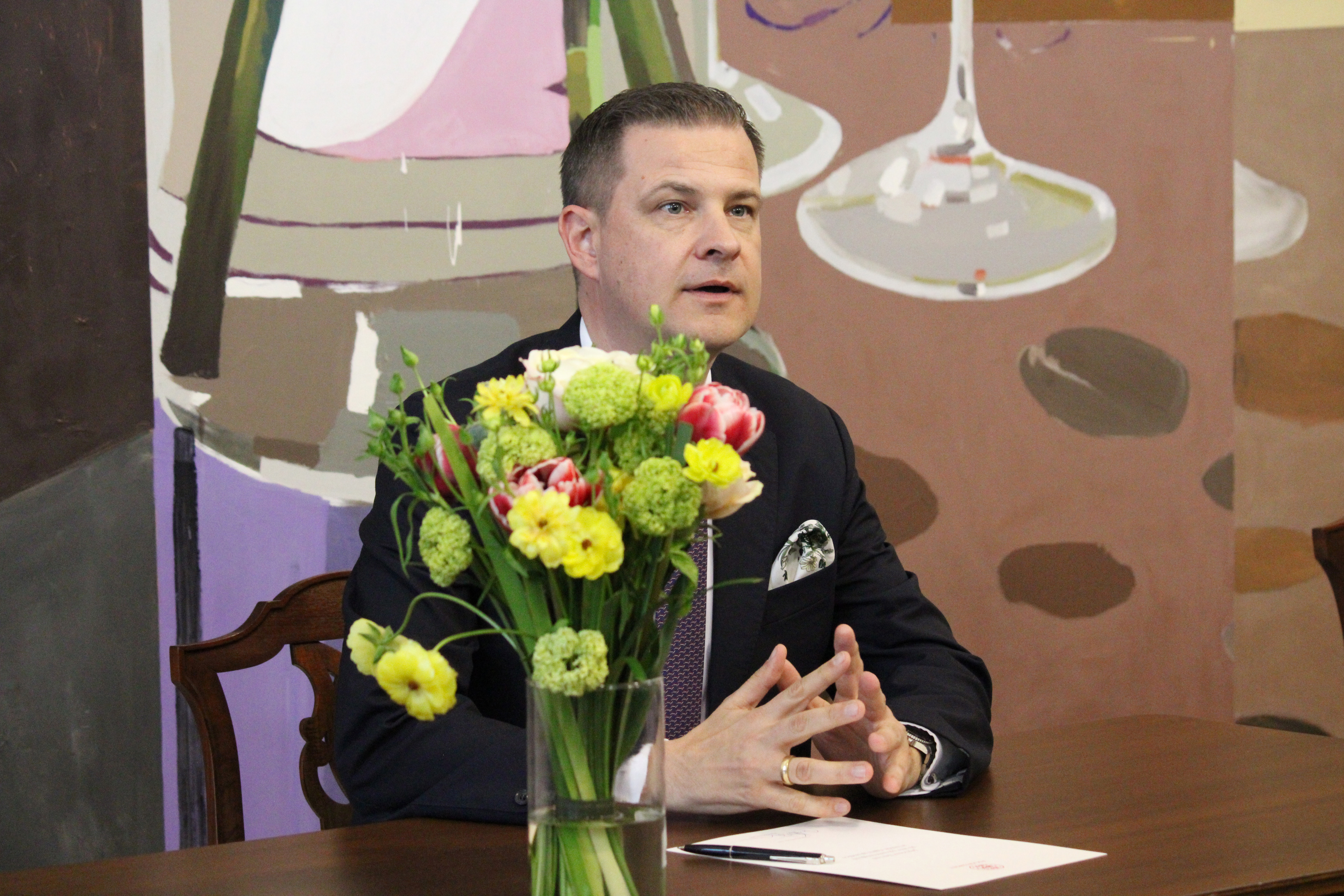
Kristensen signing a pledge to uphold the Danish Constitution at Christiansborg, 14 April 2026
