= Christian Juhl (politician) =

Danish politician

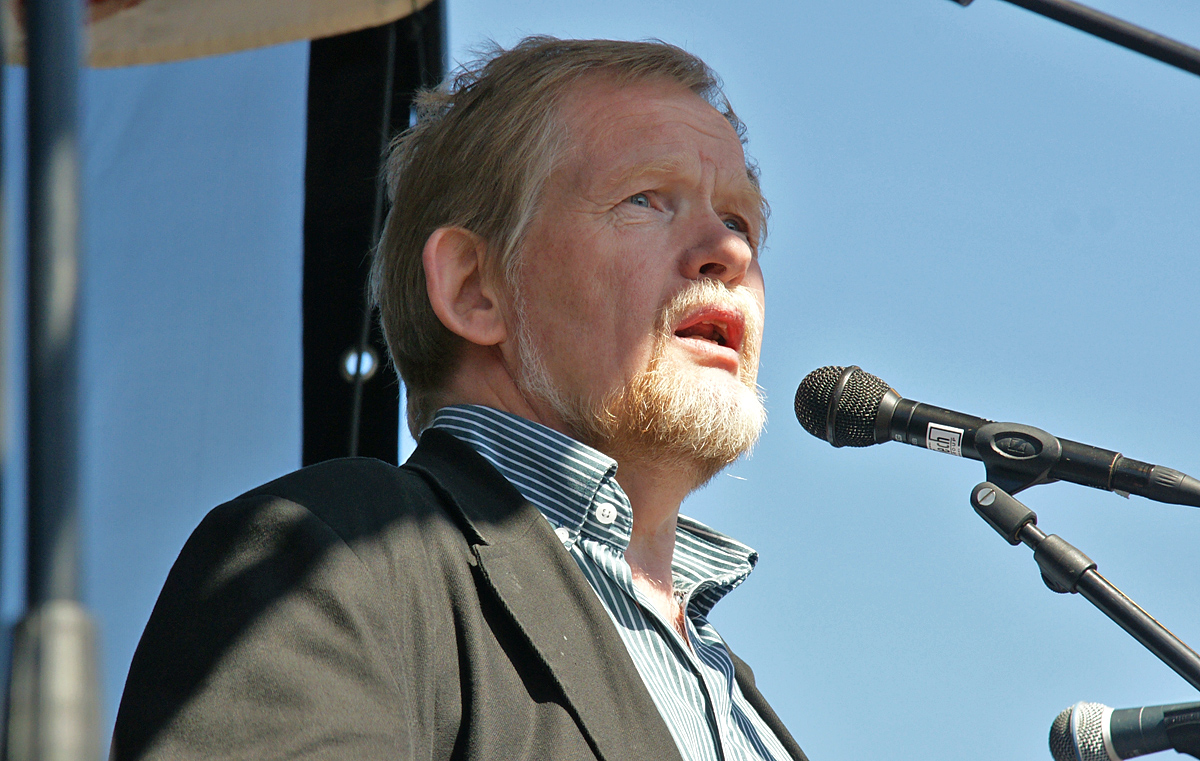
- Juhl in 2012

Member of the Folketing
- Incumbent
- Assumed office 15 September 2011
- Constituency: Zealand

Personal details
- Born: 24 February 1953 (age 73) Hejls, Denmark
- Party: Red-Green Alliance; People's Movement against the EU

Christian Juhl (born 24 February 1953 in Hejls) is a Danish politician, a member of the Folketing for the Red-Green Alliance political party. He was elected into parliament at the 2011 Danish general election.

== Political career ==
Juhl was elected into parliament in the 2011 election, where he received 1,566 votes. He was reelected in 2015 with 1,648 votes and in 2019 with 1,178 votes.

Juhl is also a member of the People's Movement against the EU, and ran in the European Parliament elections for the party in 2009, 2014 and 2019, though they did not get elected.
