= Sascha Faxe =

Danish politician (born 1971)

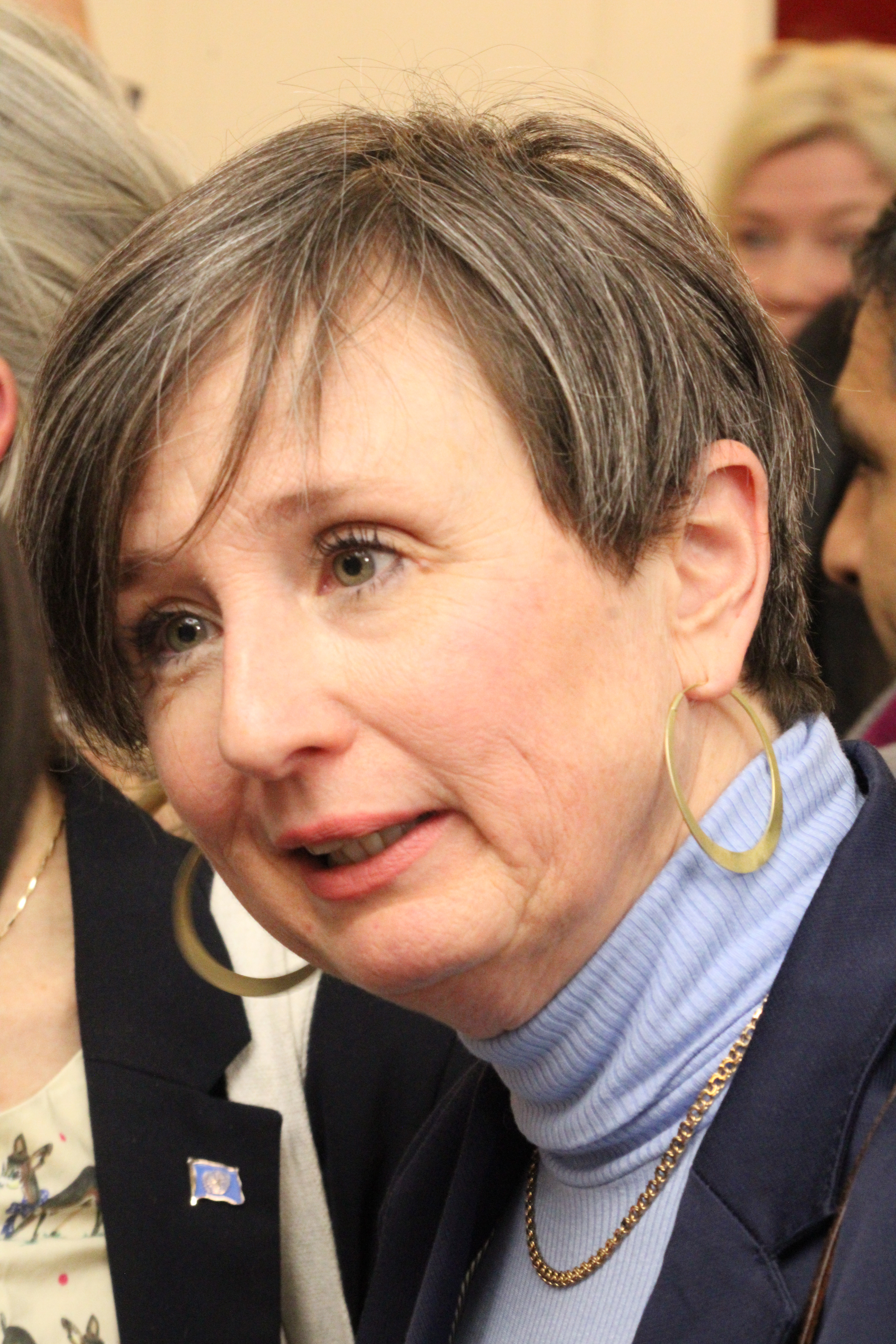
- Faxe in 2026

Member of the Folketing
- Incumbent
- Assumed office 1 November 2022
- Constituency: Zealand

Personal details
- Born: 4 August 1971 (age 54)
- Children: 2

Sascha Faxe (born 4 August 1971) is a Danish politician who has served as Member of the Folketing for The Alternative since the 2022 election.

== Career ==
Despite standing and receiving 1,192 votes in the 2019 election, Faxe was not elected and rather served as primary substitute in the Zealand constituency. She announced her candidacy for leadership of The Alternative after Uffe Elbæk stepped down, but was beaten out by Josephine Fock.

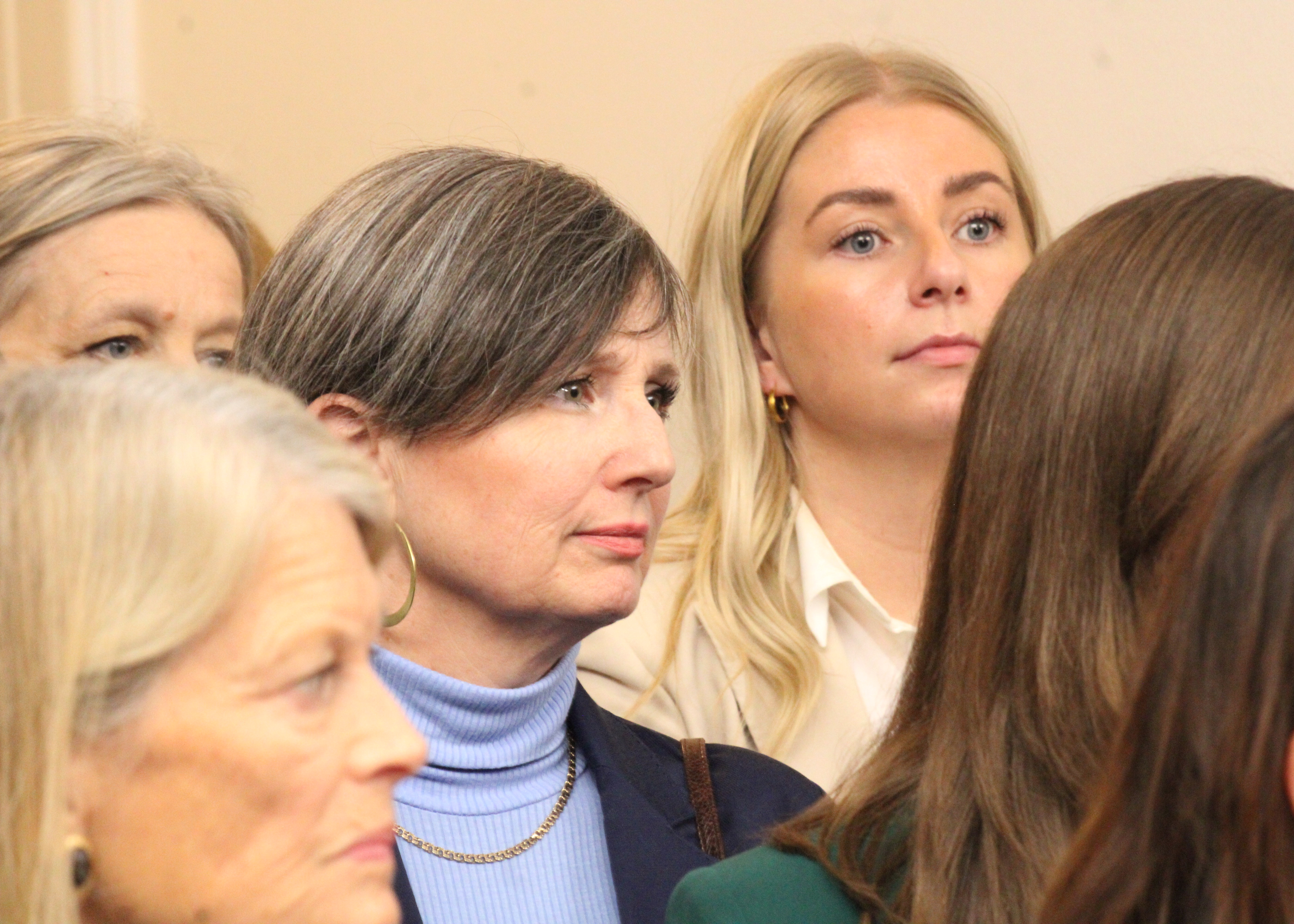
Faxe with Lisa Murkowski and Anna Falkenberg at Christiansborg during the Greenland crisis, 2026

Faxe, who hails from Lolland, but lives in Roskilde, was elected to the Folketing in 2022 with 1,129 personal votes. She has stated a desire to bring the green policies of Roskilde to all of Denmark through her new position.

== Personal life ==
Faxe has two children, born in 2003 and 2001 respectively.
