= Marcus Knuth =

Danish politician (born 1976)

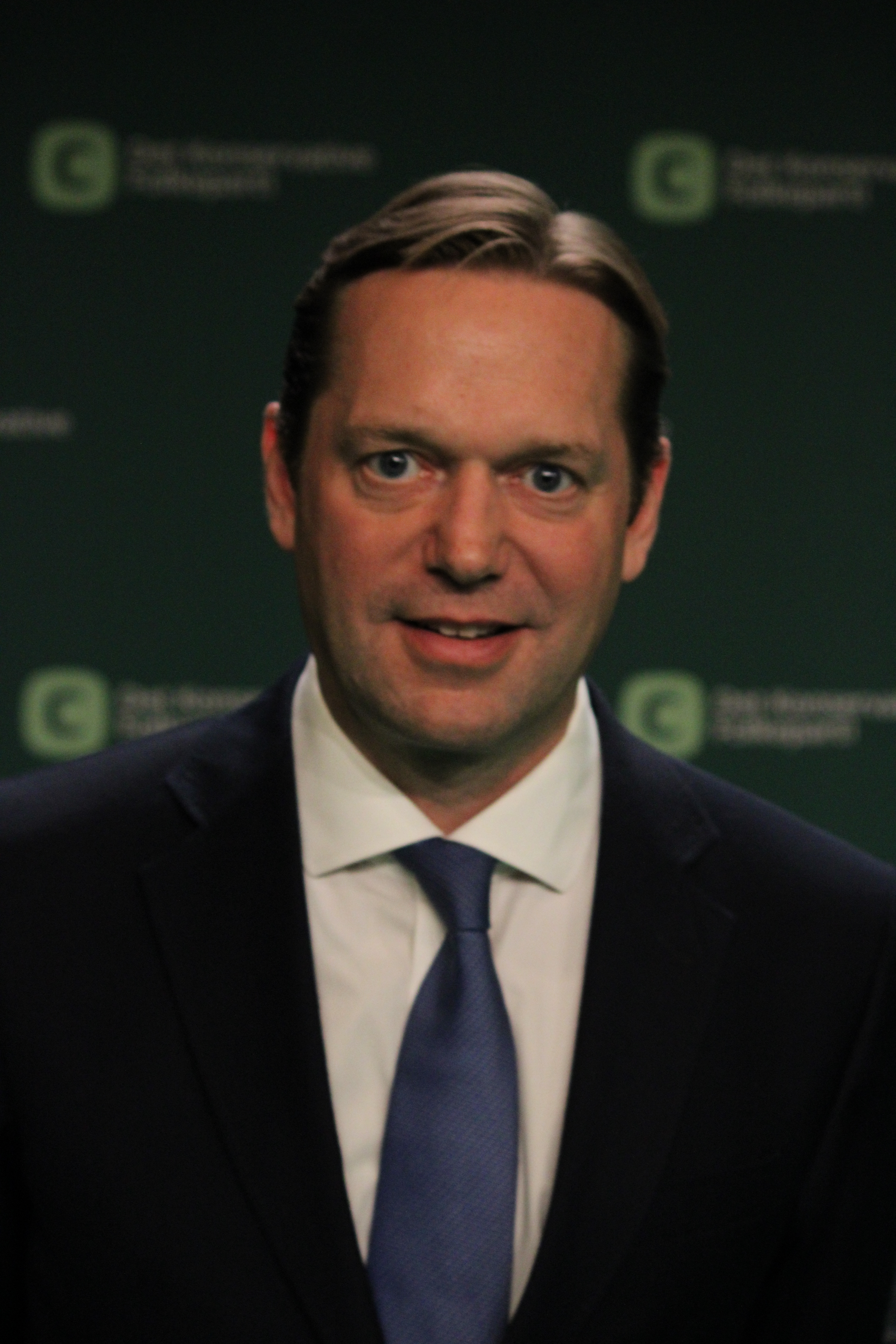
- Marcus Knuth in 2024

Member of the Folketing
- Incumbent
- Assumed office 18 June 2015
- Constituency: Zealand

Personal details
- Born: 2 April 1976 (age 50) Copenhagen, Denmark
- Party: Conservative People's Party
- Other political affiliations: Venstre
- Education: University of Virginia (BA); IESE Business School (MBA); Harvard Kennedy School (MPA)

Johan Henrik Marcus Knuth (born 2 April 1976 in Copenhagen) is a Danish politician, who is a member of the Folketing for the Conservative People's Party. He was elected into parliament in the 2015 Danish general election.

== Political career ==
Knuth was elected into parliament for the Venstre party in the 2015 election, where he received 7,351 votes. He was reelected in 2019, where he received 9,523 votes. On 29 November 2019 Knuth decided to leave Venstre and join the Conservative People's Party

== Bibliography ==
- Marcus Knuth - ny mand på Borgen (Gyldendal, 2019, co-author)
- Soldat og diplomat - mine 3 år i Afghanistan (Gyldendal, 2014)
