= Sandra Skalvig =

Danish politician (born 1990)

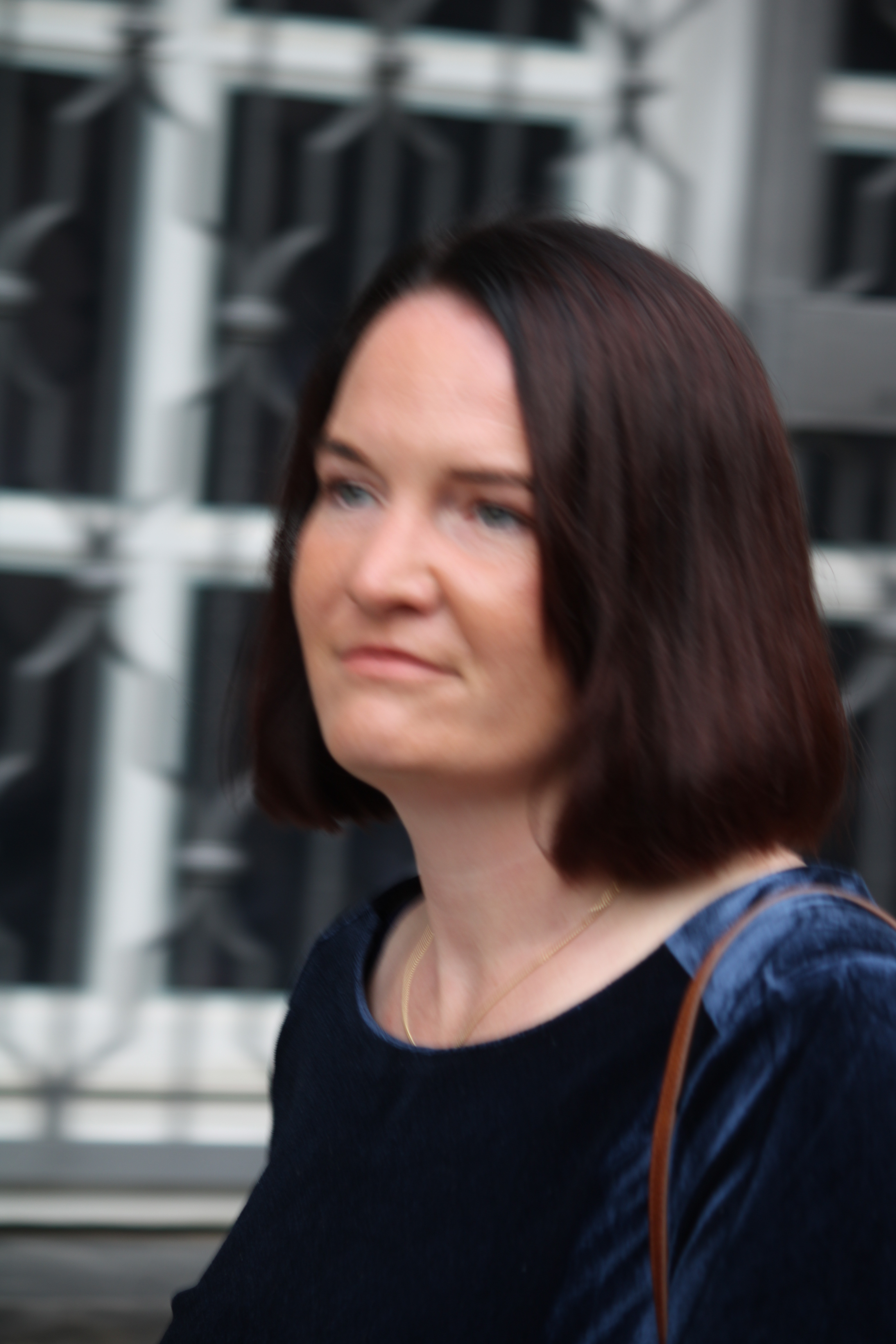
- Skalvig in 2025

Member of the Folketing
- Incumbent
- Assumed office 1 November 2022
- Constituency: Zealand

Personal details
- Born: 9 October 1990 (age 35) Kalundborg, Denmark
- Party: Liberal Alliance

Sandra Elisabeth Skalvig (born 9 October 1990) is a Danish politician, who is a member of the Folketing for the Liberal Alliance. She was elected into the Folketing in the 2022 Danish general election.
