= Astrid Carøe =

Danish politician (born 1994)

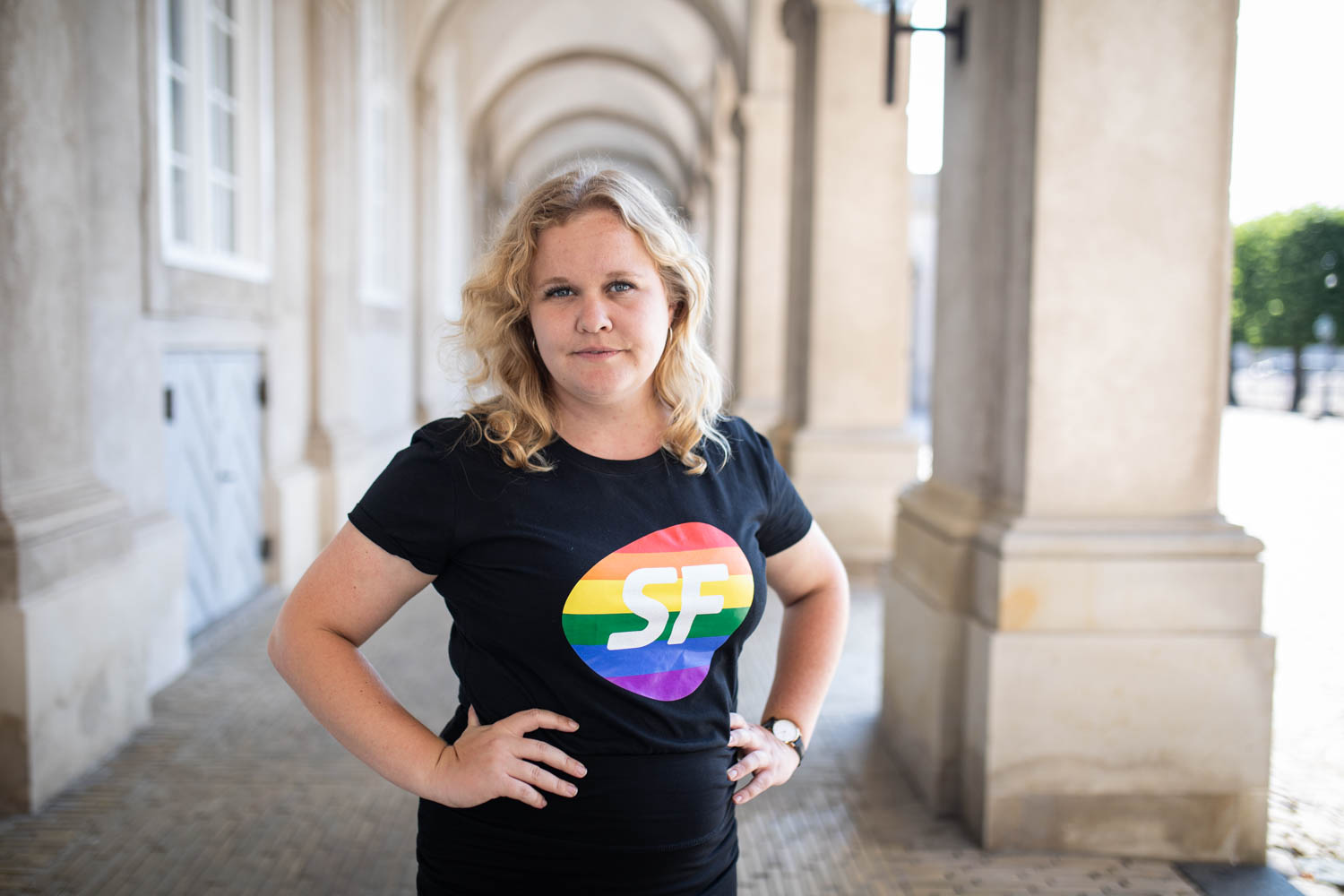
- Carøe in 2020

Member of the Folketing
- Incumbent
- Assumed office 5 June 2019
- Constituency: Zealand

Personal details
- Born: Astrid Carøe Rasmussen; 7 July 1994 (age 31) Copenhagen, Denmark
- Party: Socialist People's Party

Astrid Carøe Rasmussen (born 7 July 1994) is a Danish politician and member of the Folketing for the Socialist People's Party. She was elected into parliament in the 2019 general election.

== Background ==
Carøe is the daughter of agronomists Henrik Rasmussen and Anita Carøe Henningsen.

== Political career ==
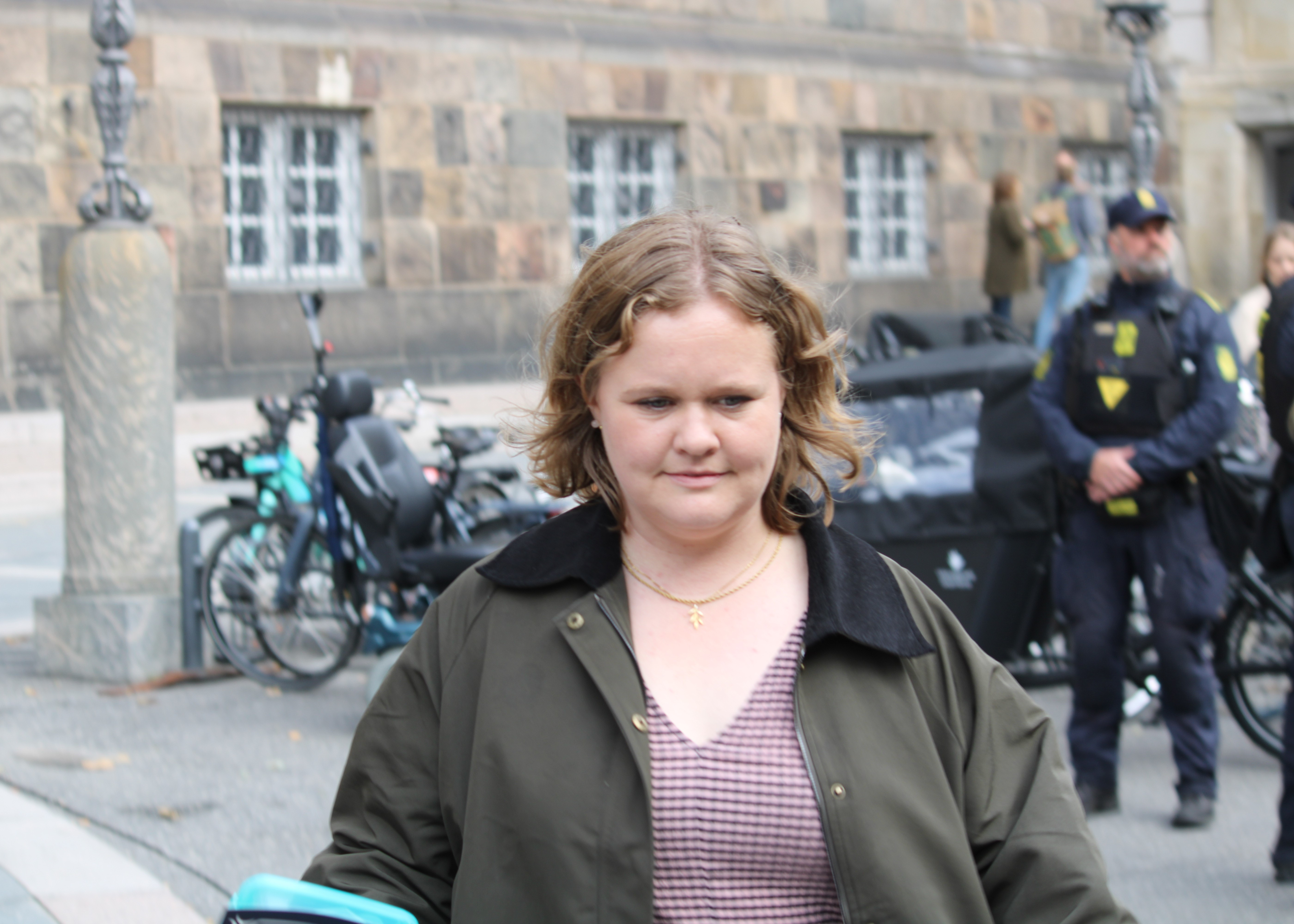
Carøe at the 2025 opening of the Folketing

Carøe ran for municipal council in Sorø Municipality in the 2013 local election. She received 199 personal votes, just 24 votes less than Linda Nielsen, who was the Socialist People's Party's other candidate. Nielsen gained the seat in the municipal council. Carøe did not run again in the 2017 local election.

Carøe was elected into parliament in the 2019 general election, where she received 2,550 personal votes.
