= Susie Jessen =

Danish politician

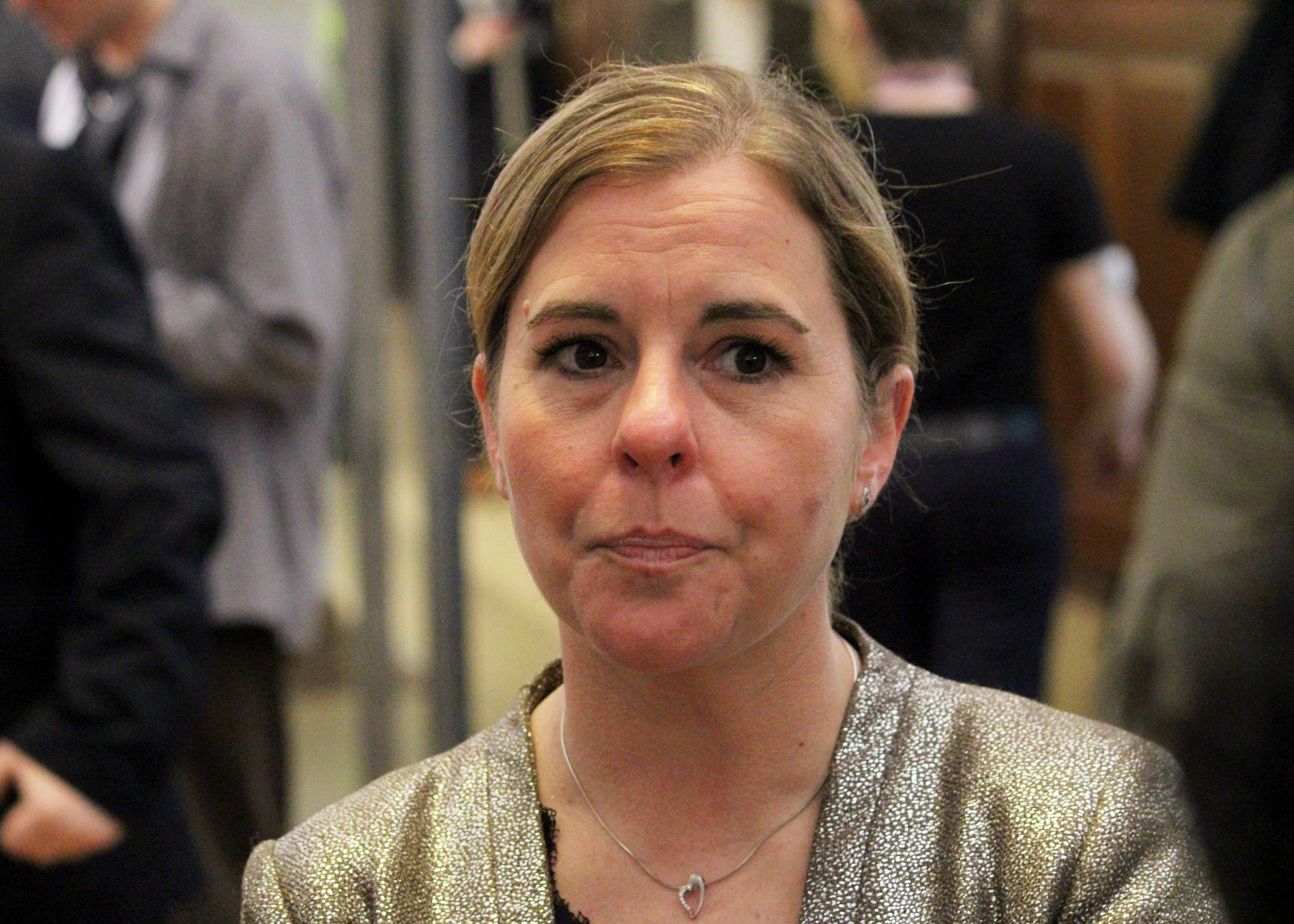
- Jessen in 2026

Member of the Folketing
- Incumbent
- Assumed office 1 November 2022
- Constituency: Zealand

Personal details
- Born: 1985 (age 40–41) Aalborg, Denmark
- Party: Denmark Democrats (2022-) Danish People's Party (until 2022)

Susie Jessen (born 1985) is a Danish politician and journalist. Since 2022 she has been a member of the Folketing for the Denmark Democrats and represents the Zealand constituency.

== Biography ==
Jessen was born in 1985 and is the daughter of politician Søren Espersen. She graduated with a diploma in journalism in 2010 and worked as a political reporter and a communications consultant for the Danish Chamber of Commerce. She later worked as a political consultant for Kristian Thulesen Dahl and was a press officer for the Danish People's Party.

For the 2022 Danish general election, Jessen was elected to the Folketing as a member of the Denmark Democrats.
