= Trine Birk Andersen =

Danish politician (born 1974)

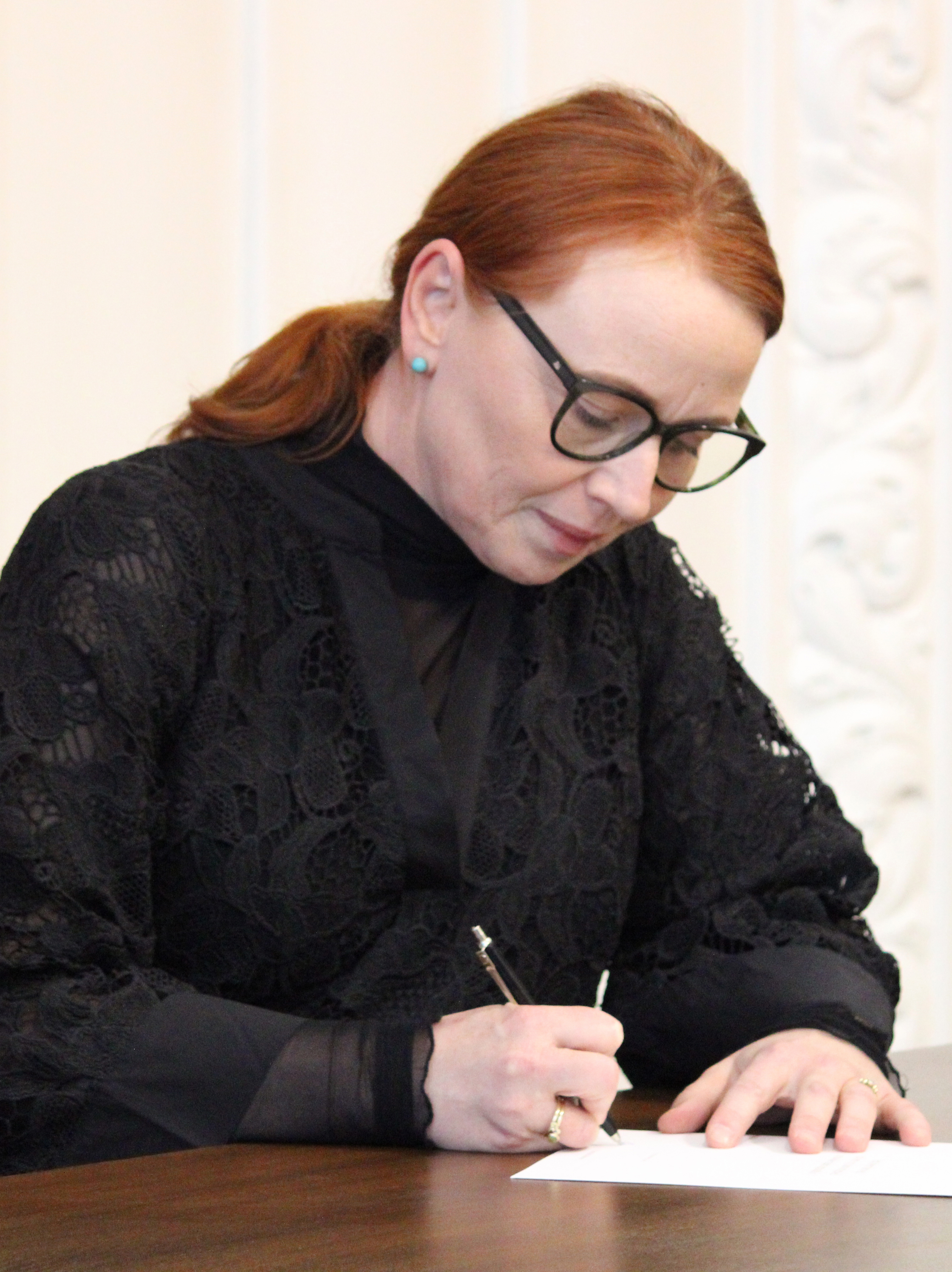
- Birk Andersen in 2026

Member of the Folketing
- Incumbent
- Assumed office 24 March 2026
- Constituency: Zealand

Personal details
- Born: 20 July 1974 (age 51)
- Party: Social Democrats

Trine Birk Andersen (born 20 July 1974) is a Danish politician serving as a member of the Folketing since 2026. She has served as chairwoman of the Regional Council of Zealand since 2024.

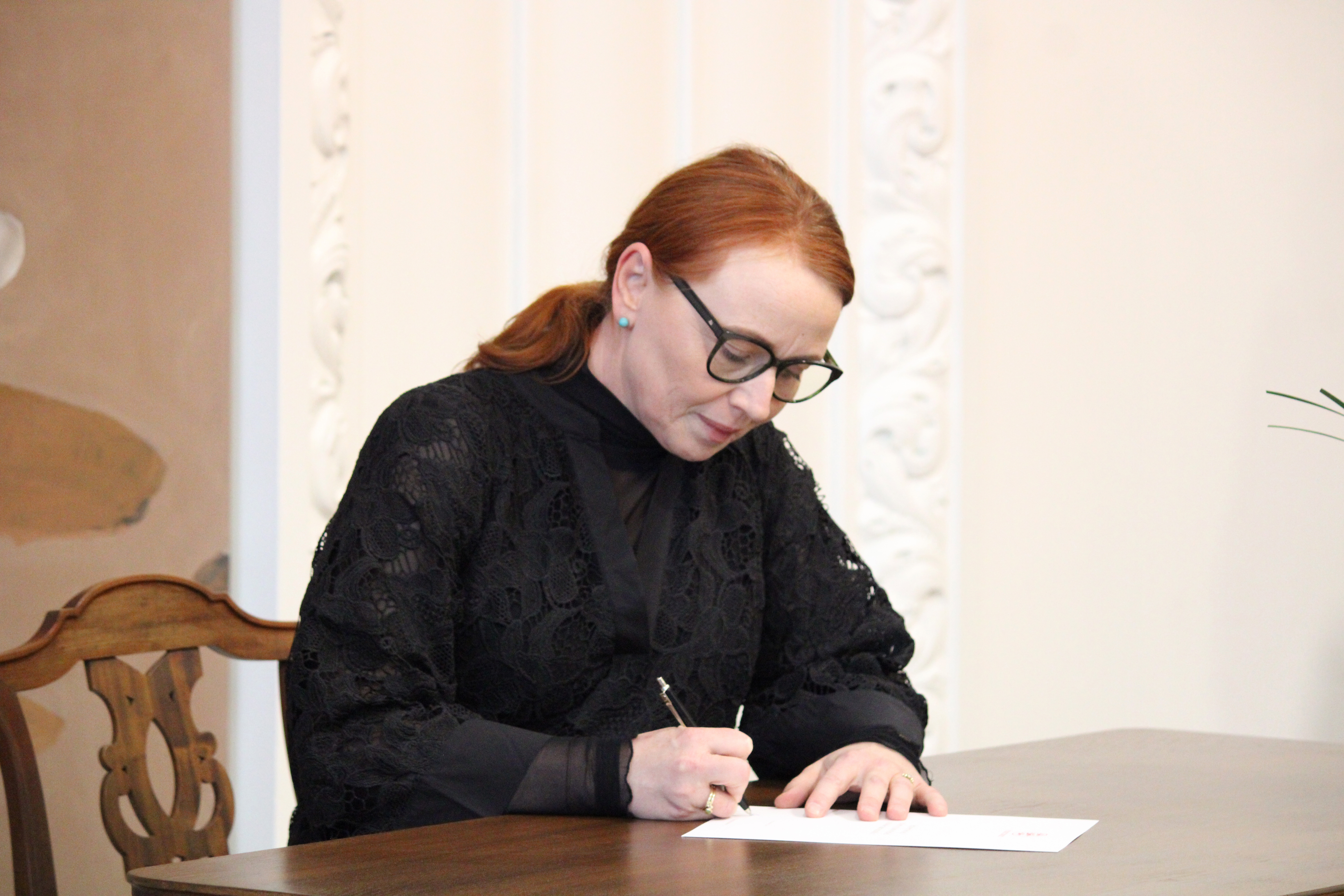
Birk Andersen signing a pledge to uphold the Danish Constitution at Christiansborg, 14 April 2026
