= Elise Sydendal =

Danish politician (born 1999)

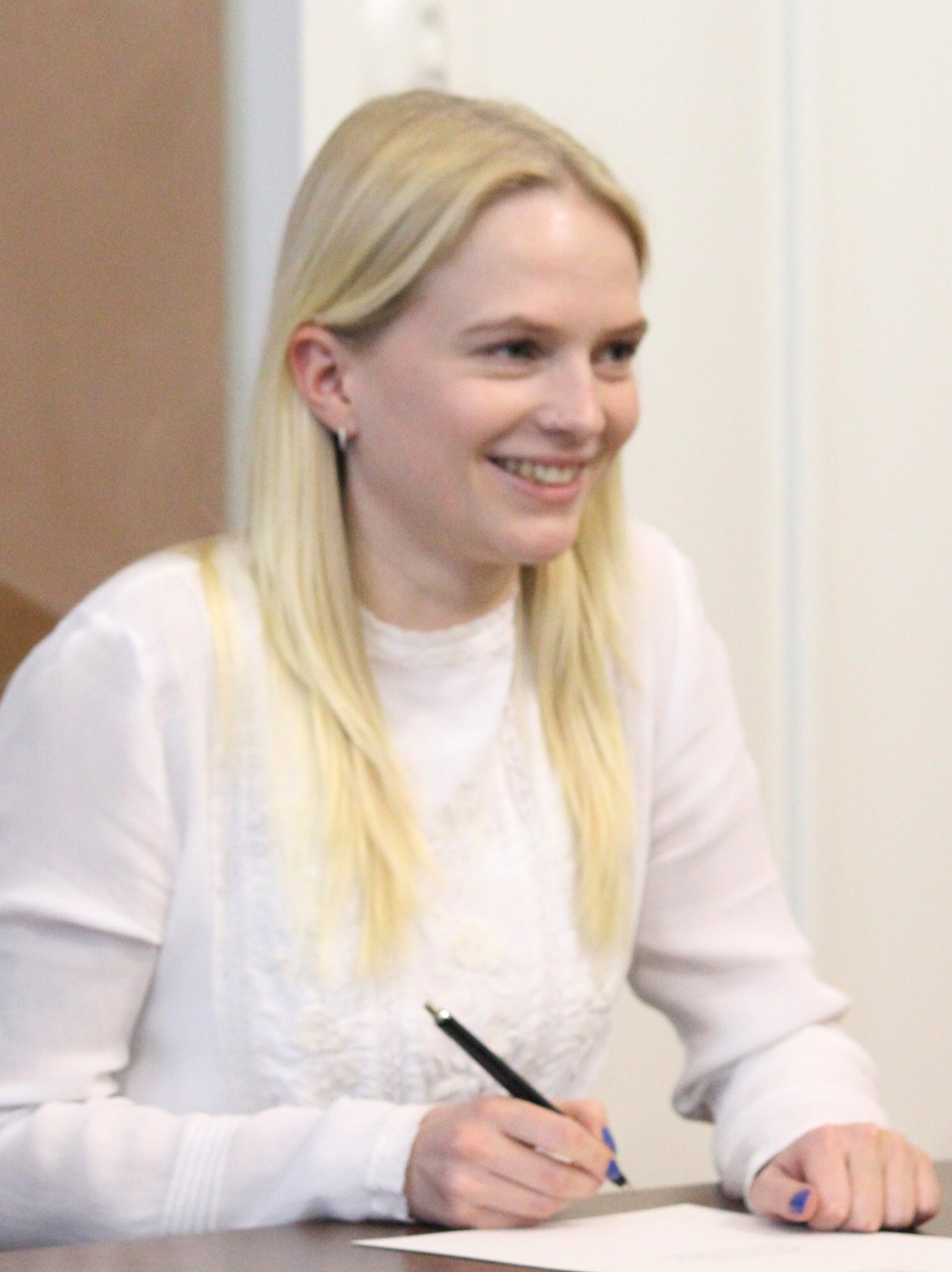
- Sydendal in 2026

Member of the Folketing
- Incumbent
- Assumed office 24 March 2026
- Constituency: Zealand

Personal details
- Born: 18 September 1999 (age 26)
- Party: The Alternative

Elise Sydendal (born 18 September 1999) is a Danish politician serving as a member of the Folketing since 2026. She previously worked as a secretary.
