= Lars-Christian Brask =

Danish politician (born 1963)

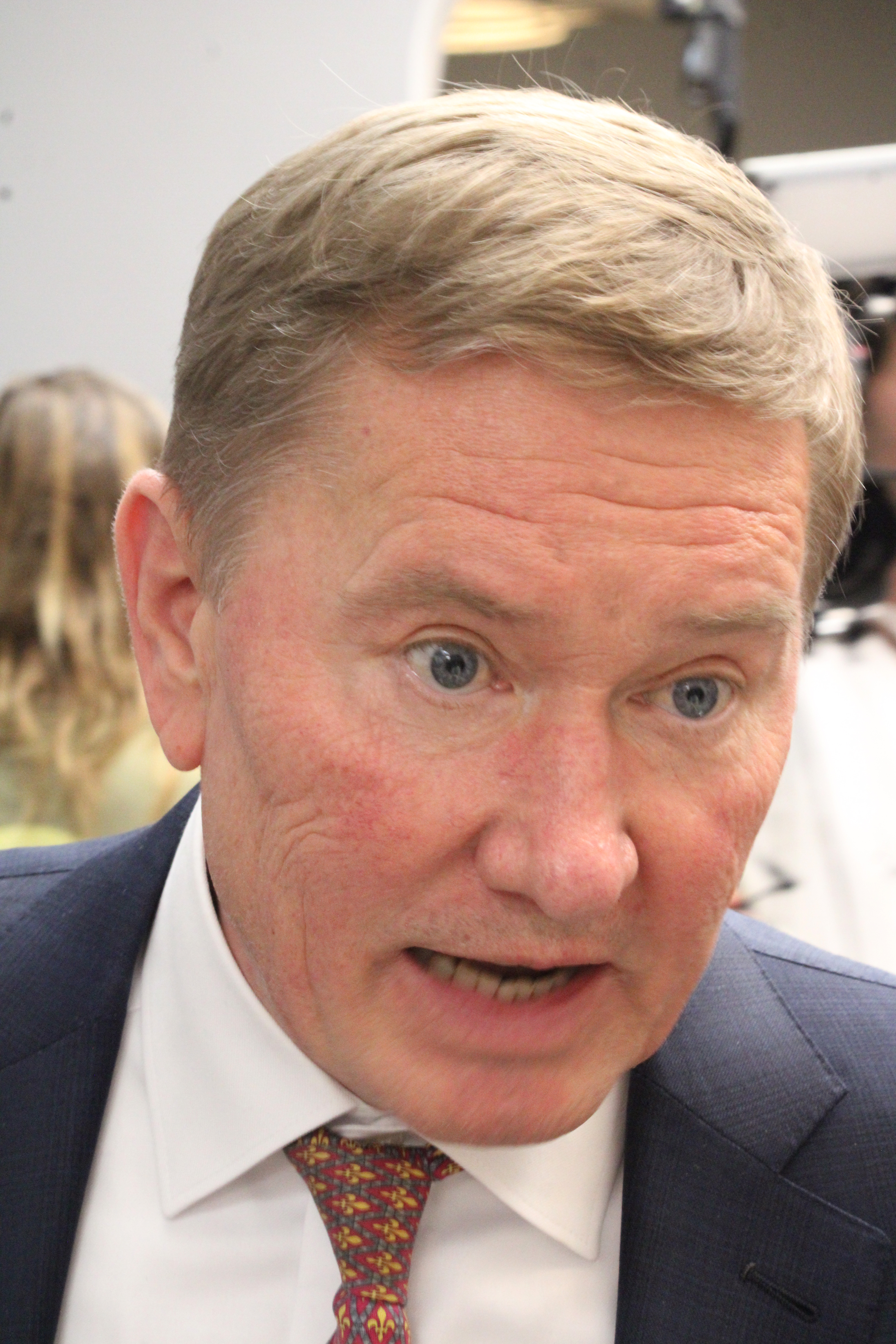
- Brask in 2026

Member of the Folketing
- Incumbent
- Assumed office 2022
- Constituency: Zealand

Personal details
- Born: 25 May 1963 (age 62) Visby, Denmark
- Party: Liberal Alliance

Lars-Christian Brask (born 25 May 1963) is a Danish politician and businessman. He was elected a member of parliament for the Liberal Alliance in the 2022 Danish general election.

== Political history ==
Brask entered politics at the municipal level in 2013 under the Venstre. Brask transitioned from Venstre to the Liberal Alliance in 2019 to align with Liberal Alliance leader Alex Vanopslagh’s direction.

Brask was first elected to national office in 2022, and as of 2024 is a sitting member of the Danish Parliament for Liberal Alliance.

As of 2024 Brask serves as an Udenrigsordfører, the primary spokesperson for their party on matters concerning foreign affairs.

== Business history ==
- 1990-1996: Country Head, Nordic Region all services and products, Merrill Lynch (Bank of America)
- 1996-1999: Partner, Managing Director, Europe and Head of Capital Markets, Robertson Stephens (Bank of America)
- 1999-2003: CEO, Brask & Company Ltd
- 2003-2005: Director, Key Clients & Business Development, UBS Wealth Management
- 2005-2010: Director, Head of Private Banking, Carnegie Investment Bank
- since 2015: Executive Director and facilitator, Presidents Institute

== See also ==
- List of members of the Folketing, 2022–present
