= Brigitte Klintskov Jerkel =

Danish politician (born 1969)

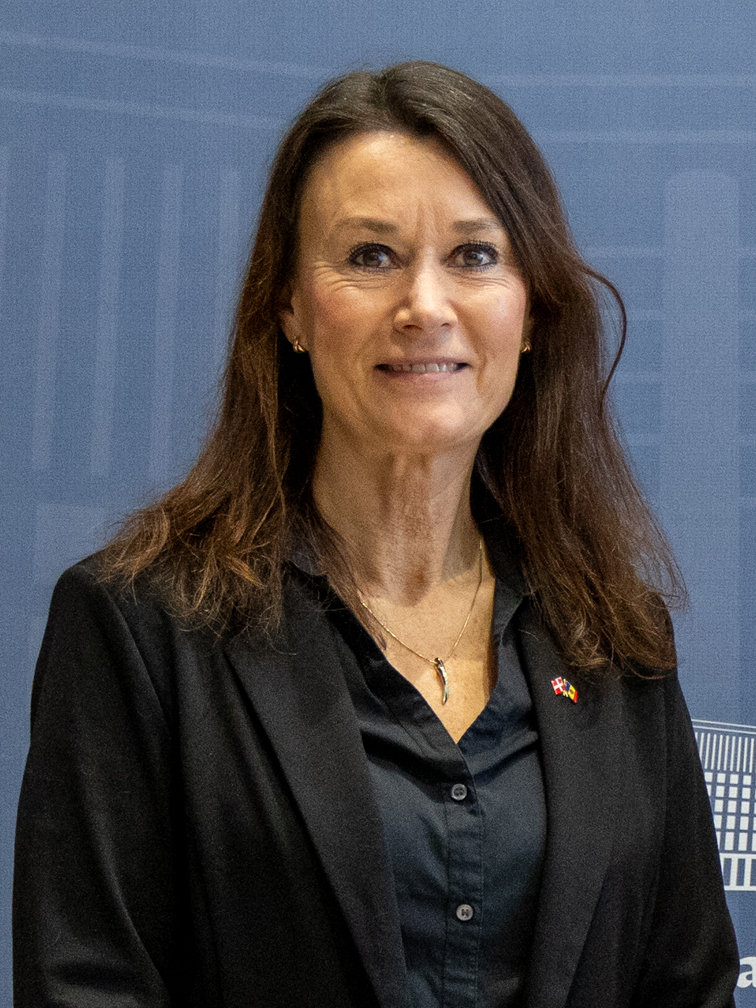
- Jerkel in 2025

Member of the Folketing
- Incumbent
- Assumed office 22 June 2018
- Constituency: Zealand

Personal details
- Born: 21 July 1969 (age 57) Gentofte, Denmark
- Party: Conservative People's Party

Brigitte Klintskov Jerkel (born 12 July 1969) is a Danish politician, who is a member of the Folketing for the Conservative People's Party. She took over Brian Mikkelsen's seat in parliament when he resigned on 22 June 2018. Jerkel was first elected into parliament on her own mandate in the 2019 Danish general election.

== Political career ==
Jerkel has been in the municipal council of Greve Municipality since the 2005 Danish local elections, and has previously served as deputy mayor of the municipality. Additionally she has been a member of the regional council of Region Zealand since 2014. Jerkel ran in the 2015 election, where she received 1,236 votes. This was not enough for a seat in parliament, but it made her the Conservative People's Party's primary substitute in the Zealand constituency. She served as substitute for Brian Mikkelsen from 15 December 2016 to 21 June 2018. When Brian Mikkelsen resigned his seat in parliament on 22 June 2018 Jerkel took over the seat. She was elected into parliament on her own mandate in 2019, receiving 3,485 votes.
