= Kasper Roug =

Danish politician

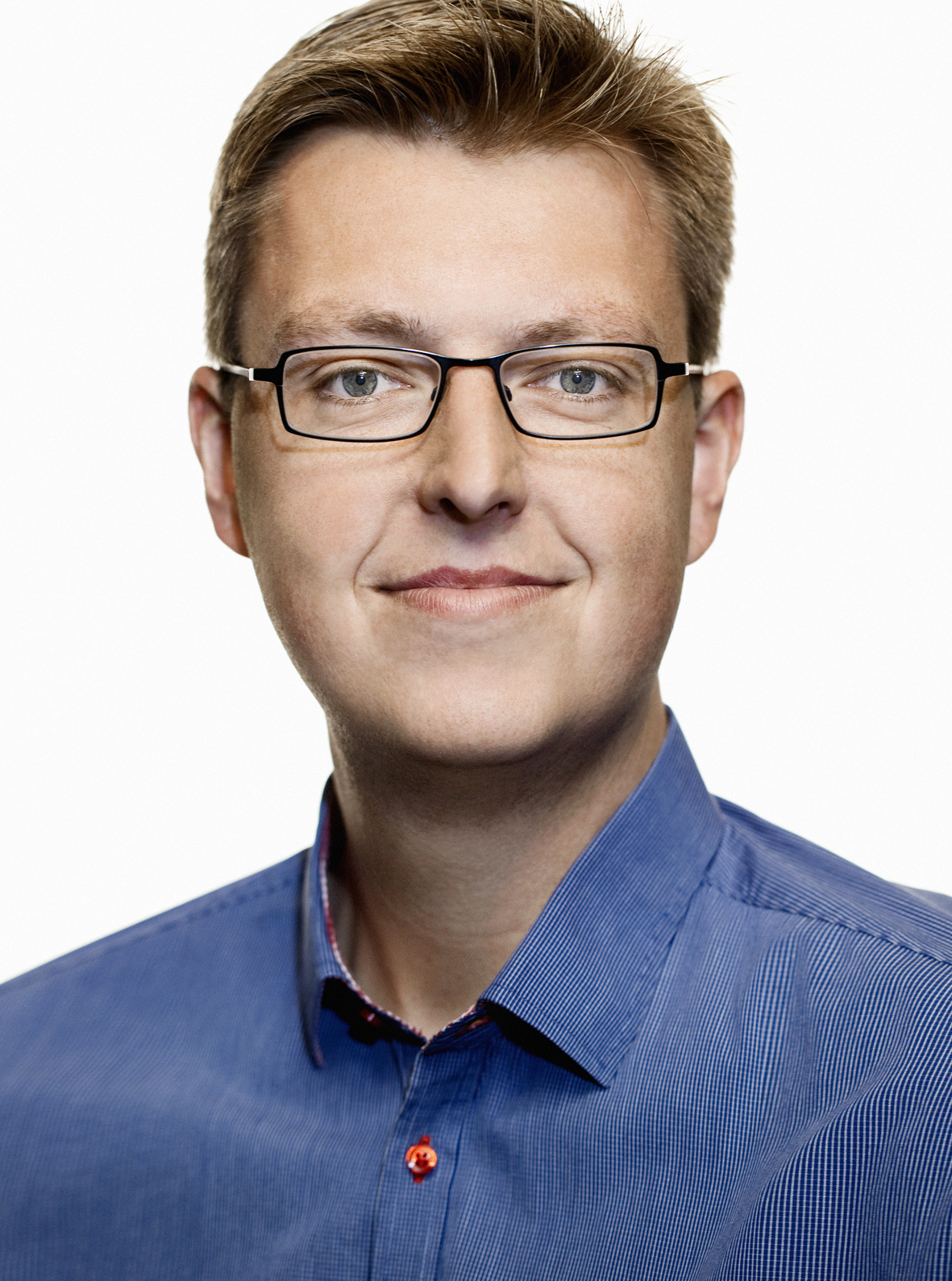

Member of the Folketing
- Incumbent
- Assumed office 5 June 2019
- Constituency: Zealand

Personal details
- Born: 6 June 1979 (age 46) Nakskov, Denmark
- Party: Social Democrats

Kasper Roug (born 6 June 1979) is a Danish politician, who is a member of the Folketing for the Social Democrats political party. He was elected into parliament at the 2019 Danish general election.

== Political career ==
Roug has been a member of the municipal council of Lolland Municipality since 2018. Roug has been a substitute member of the Folketing on two occasions: from 3 November 2015 to 3 June 2016 substituting for Astrid Krag, and from 12 March 2018 to 31 May 2018 substituting for Rasmus Horn Langhoff. In 2019 he was elected into parliament, receiving 5,249 personal votes in the election.
