= Charlotte Bagge Hansen =

Danish politician (born 1969)

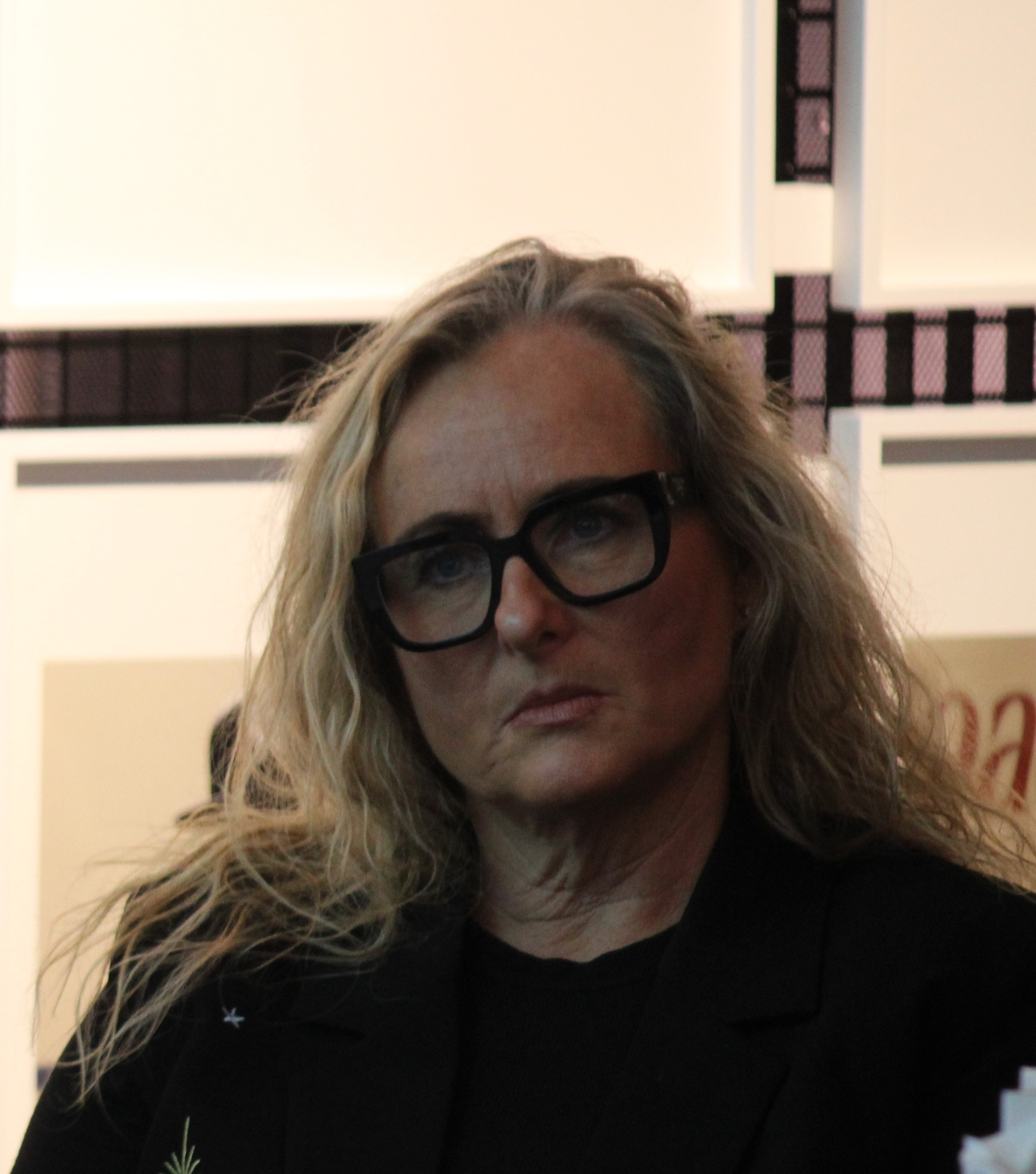
- Bagge Hansen in 2025

Member of the Folketing
- Incumbent
- Assumed office 1 November 2022
- Constituency: Zealand

Personal details
- Born: 28 July 1969 (age 56) Denmark
- Party: Moderates
- Occupation: Politician

Charlotte Bagge Hansen (born 28 July 1969) is a Danish politician and Member of the Folketing for Zealand from the Moderates. Alongside sixteen other members of The Moderates, Hansen was elected to the Folketing in November 2022. She is her party's spokesperson on fisheries, agriculture, trade and industry, food and environment.

== See also ==
- List of members of the Folketing, 2022–present
