= Morten Dahlin =

Danish politician

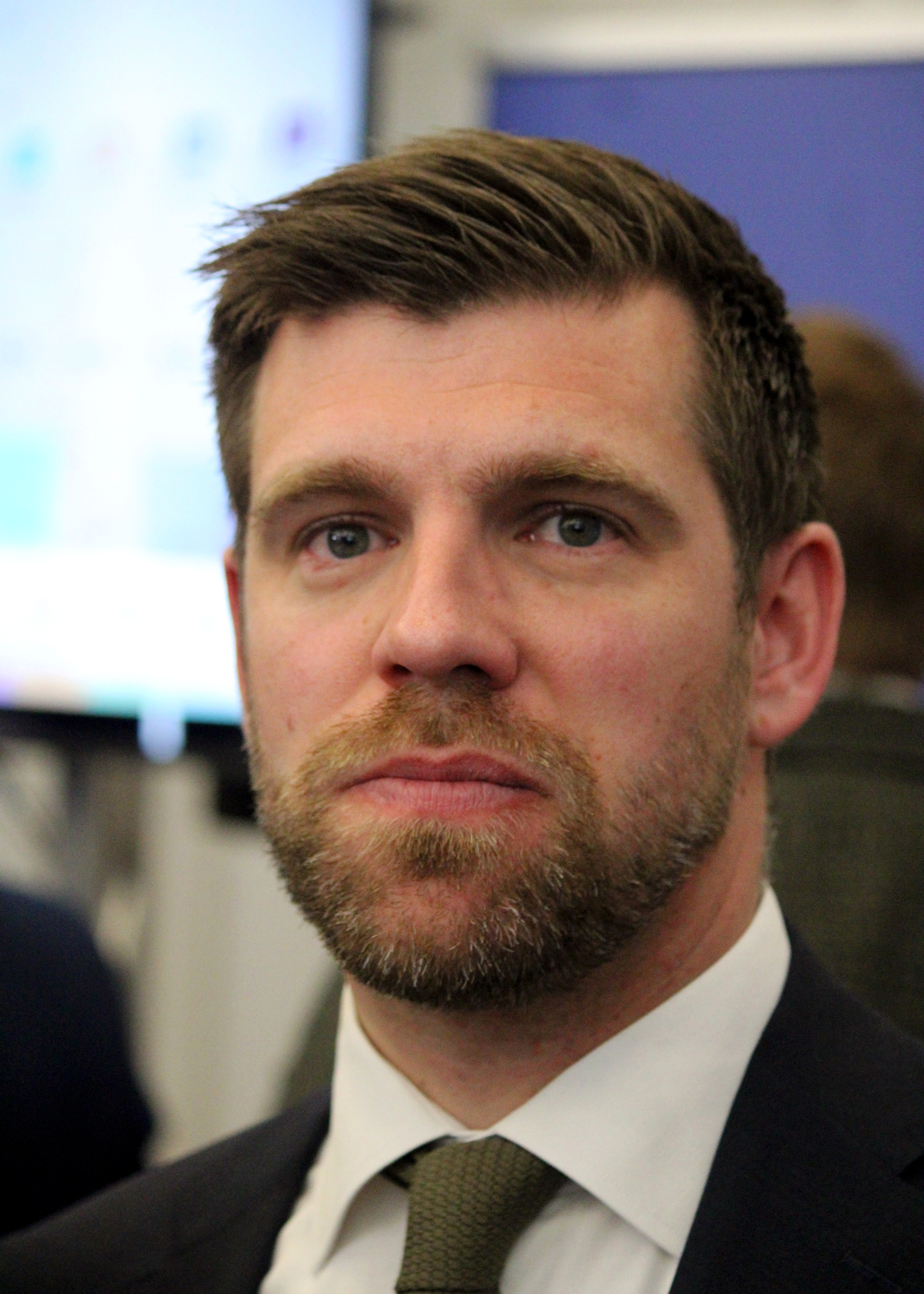
- Dahlin in 2026

Minister for Ecclesiastical Affairs
- In office 23 November 2023 – 3 June 2026
- Prime Minister: Mette Frederiksen
- Preceded by: Louise Schack Elholm
- Succeeded by: Ida Auken

Member of the Folketing
- Incumbent
- Assumed office 5 June 2019
- Constituency: Zealand

Personal details
- Born: 1 May 1989 (age 37) Hvidovre, Denmark
- Party: Venstre

Morten Dahlin (born 1 May 1989) is a Danish politician who serves as a member of the Folketing for the Venstre political party. He was elected to parliament at the 2019 Danish general election.

Since 2023, Dahlin has been serving as minister for ecclesiastical affairs, rural districts and Nordic cooperation in the cabinet of Prime Minister Mette Frederiksen.

== Political career ==
Dahlin was elected into the municipal council of Greve Municipality at the 2017 Danish local elections.

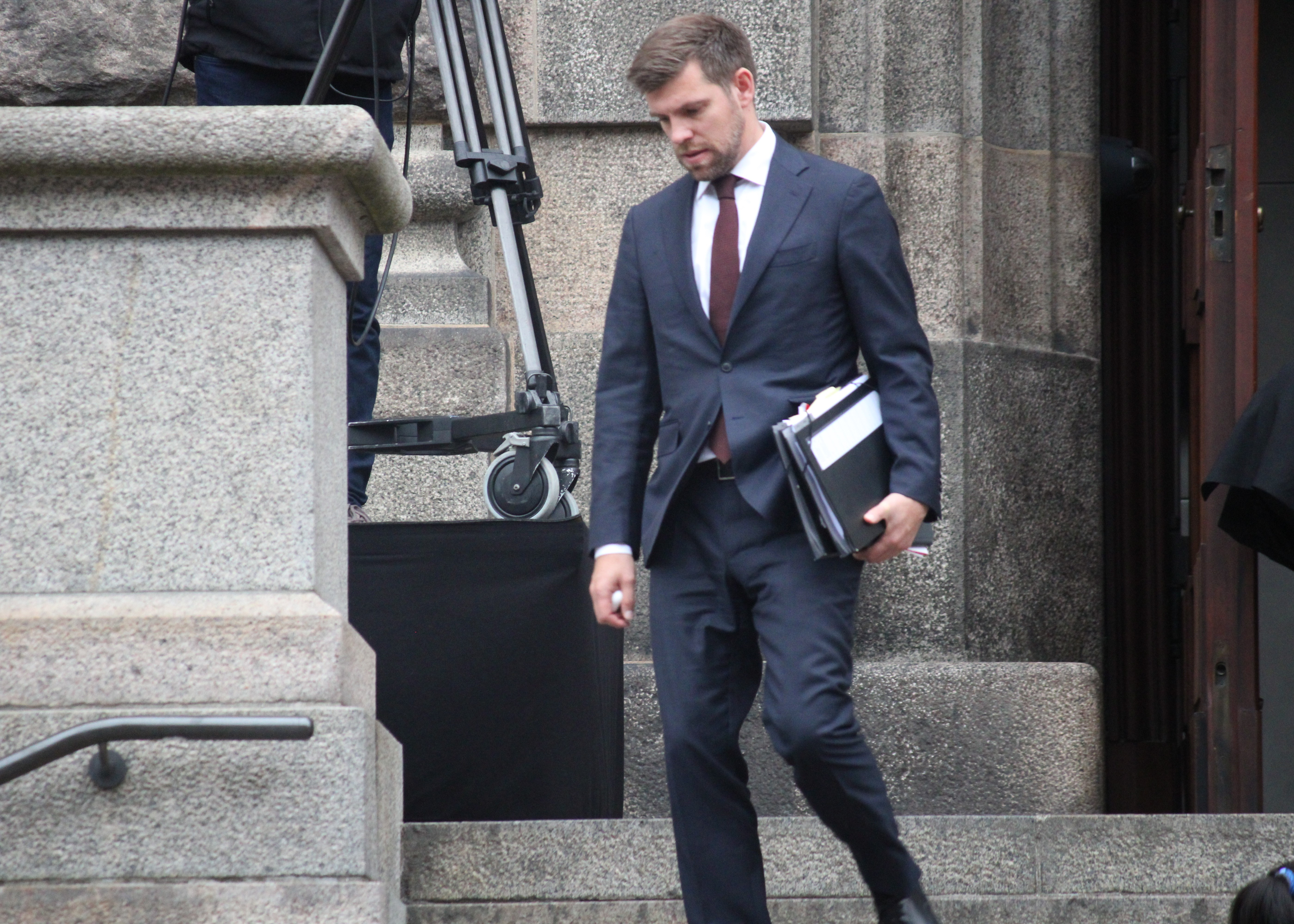
Dahlin at the 2025 opening of the Danish parliament

Dahlin first ran for parliament in the 2015 general election, where he received 2,986 votes. This was not enough for a seat in parliament, although he became the primary substitute for Venstre in the Zealand constituency. He was not called upon during the 2015-2019 term however. He ran again in the 2019 election, where he was elected with 6,471 votes.
