= Kathrine Olldag =

Danish politician

Member of the Folketing
- Incumbent
- Assumed office 5 June 2019
- Constituency: Zealand

Personal details
- Born: 20 December 1972 (age 53) Aabenraa, Denmark
- Party: Social Liberal Party

Kathrine Olldag (born 20 December 1972 in Aabenraa) is a Danish politician, who is a member of the Folketing for the Social Liberal Party. She was elected into parliament at the 2019 Danish general election.

== Political career ==
Olldag was elected into parliament at the 2019 election, where she received 1,595 personal votes.
