= Frederik Vad =

Danish politician (born 1994)

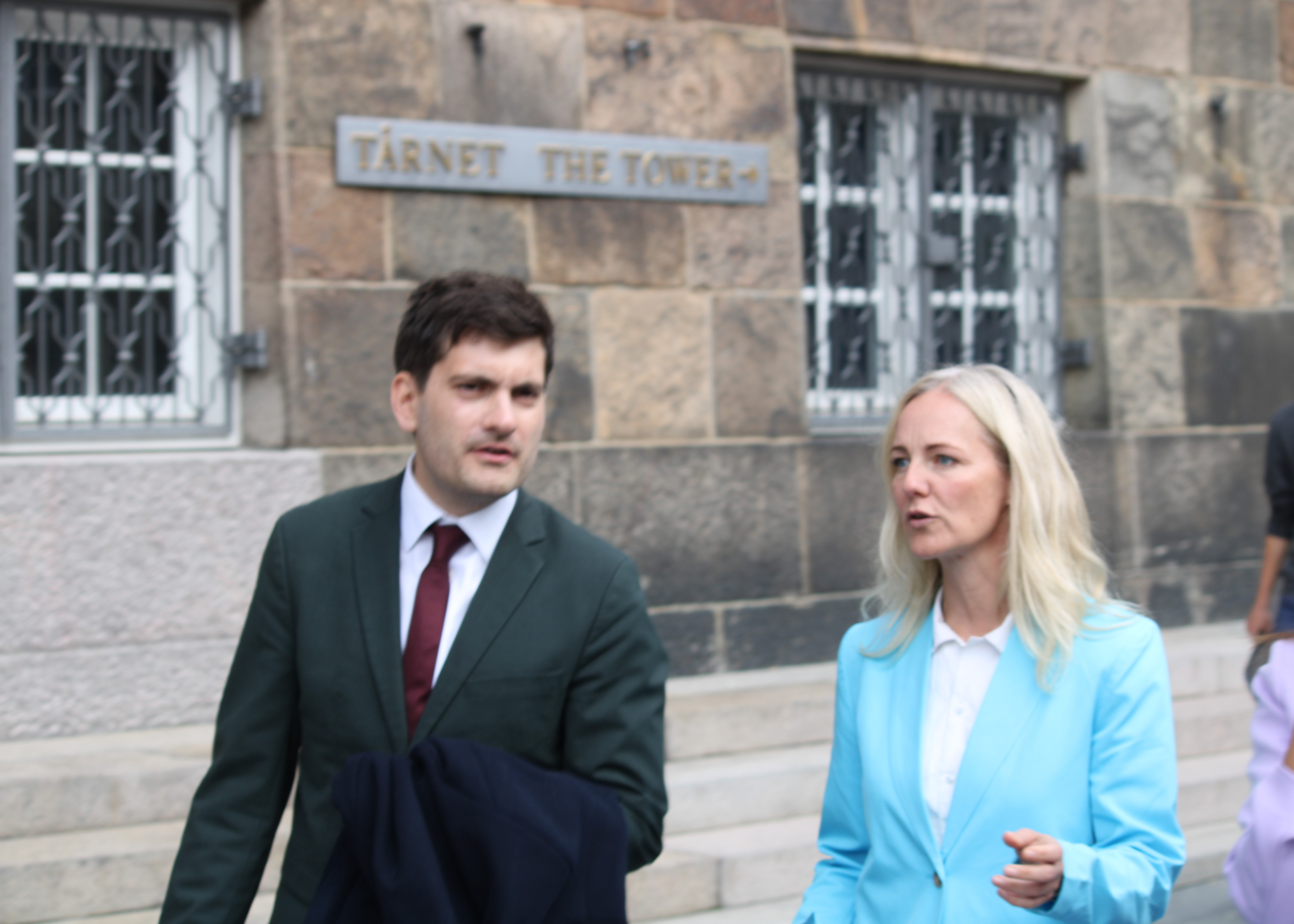
- Vad in 2025

Member of the Folketing
- Incumbent
- Assumed office 1 November 2022

Personal details
- Born: 1 October 1994 (age 31) Holbæk, Denmark
- Party: Social Democrats
- Occupation: Politician

Frederik Vad Nielsen (born 1 September 1994) is a Danish politician who has been a member of the Folketing for the Social Democrats since 2022.

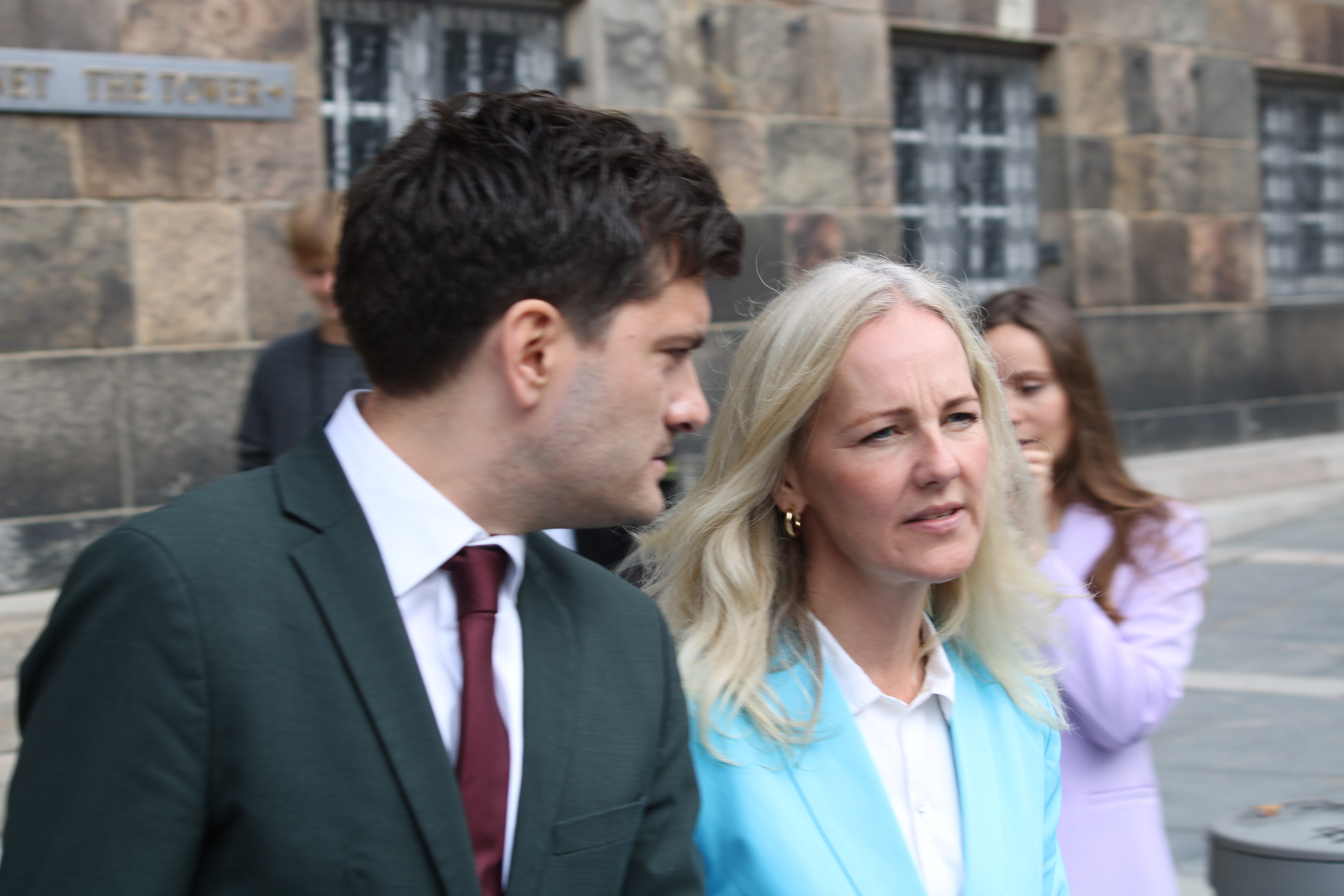
Vad with Ida Auken at the 2025 opening of the Folketing

== See also ==
- List of members of the Folketing, 2022–present
