= Rasmus Horn Langhoff =

Danish politician

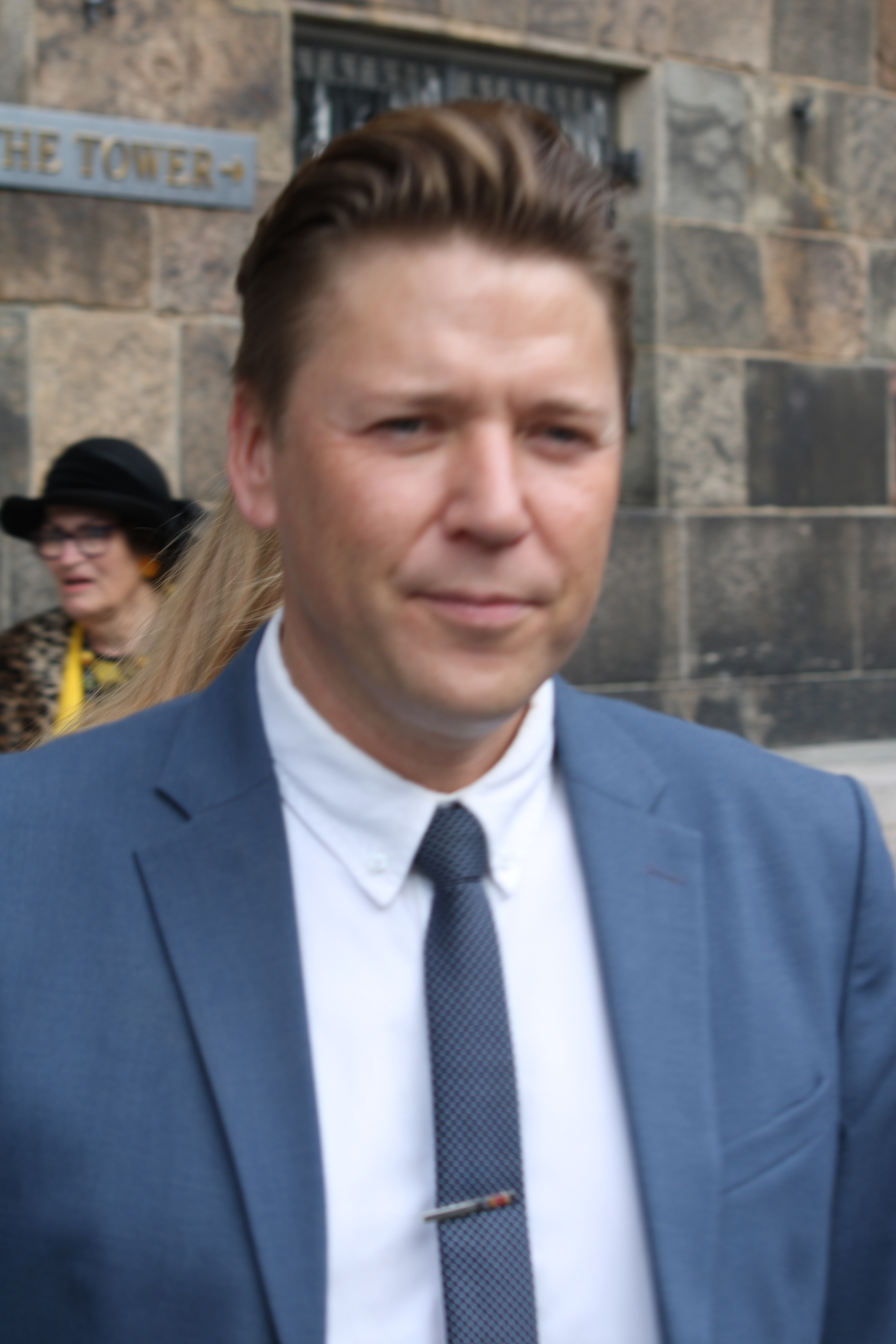
- Horn Langhoff in 2025

Member of the Folketing
- Incumbent
- Assumed office 15 September 2011
- Constituency: Zealand

Personal details
- Born: 8 October 1980 (age 45) Slagelse, Denmark
- Party: Social Democrats

Rasmus Horn Langhoff (born 8 October 1980) is a Danish politician, who is a member of the Folketing for the Social Democrats political party. He was elected into parliament in the 2011 Danish general election.

== Political career ==
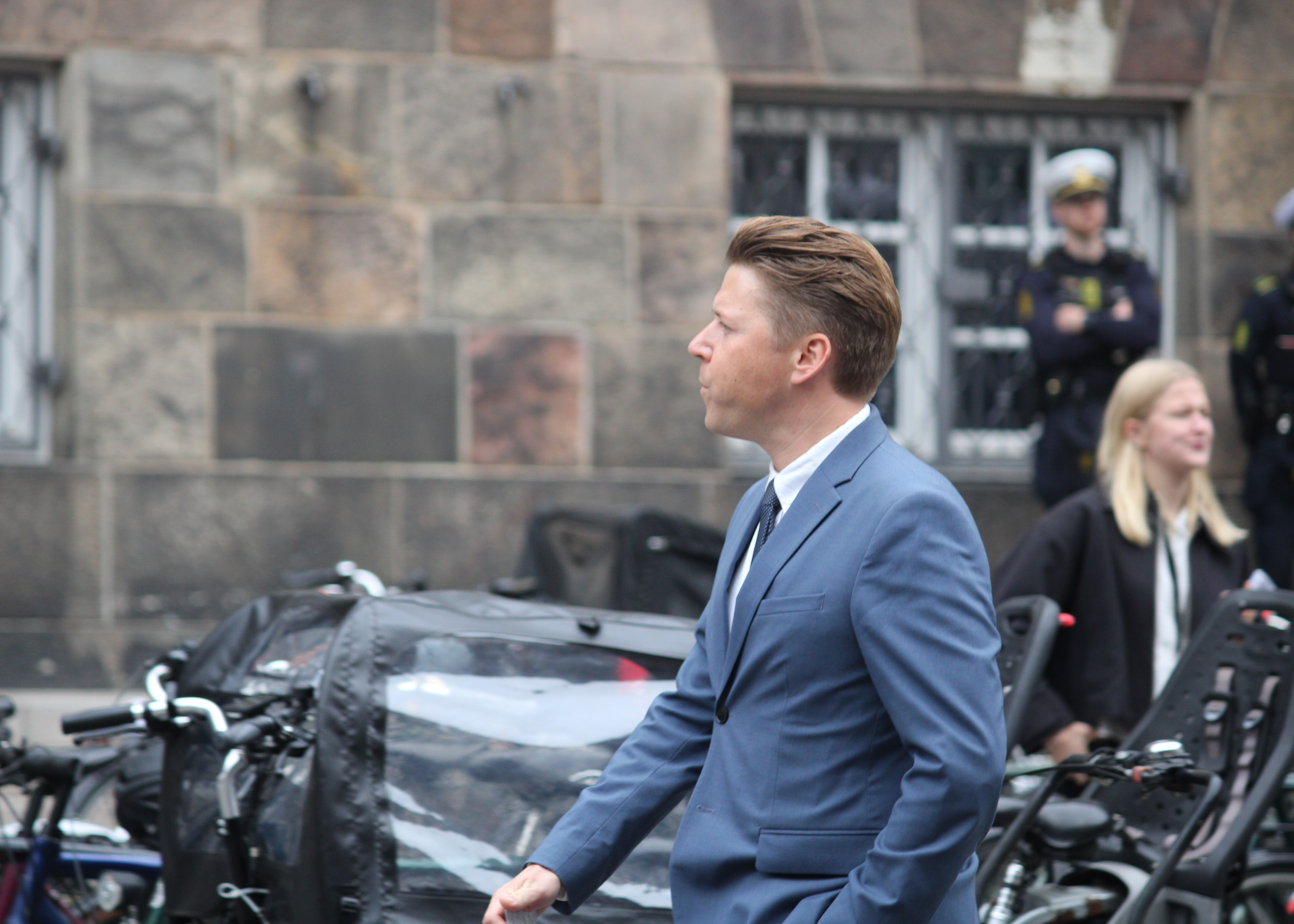
Langhoff at the 2025 opening of parliament

Langhoff was first elected into parliament in the 2011 election, where he received 5,410 personal votes. He was reelected in 2015 with 5,917 votes and in 2019 with 5,812 votes.
