= Parliamentary committees in the Folketing =

There are thirty standing parliamentary committees in the Folketing, the parliament of Denmark. Standing committees typically have a composition of 29 MPs.

The primary responsibility of these committees is to deliberate on legislative proposals referred for consideration. Additionally, the committees stay abreast of developments within their respective areas, posing inquiries to ministers, who respond either in writing or through oral sessions known as committee hearings (Danish: samråd). Moreover, committees may receive delegations (Danish: "deputationer") from organizations and others.

== Current committees ==
=== Standing committees ===
Following the 2022 Danish general election, the number of standing committees in the Danish Parliament was expanded from 27 to 30.

Committee	Chair	Chair's party
Business	Hans Andersen	Venstre
Children and Education	Karina Adsbøl	Denmark Democrats
Climate, Energy and Utilities	Rasmus Horn Langhoff	Social Democrats
Cultural Affairs	Hans Christian Schmidt	Venstre
Defence	Rasmus Jarlov	Conservatives
Digitization and IT	Lisbeth Bech-Nielsen	Green Left
Domestic Affairs	Theresa Berg Andersen	Green Left
Ecclesiastical Affairs	Søren Espersen	Denmark Democrats
Employment	Bjarne Laustsen	Social Democrats
Environment and Food	Hans Kristian Skibby	Denmark Democrats
European Affairs	Niels Flemming Hansen	Conservatives
Faroe Islands	Anna Falkenberg	Union Party
Finance	Simon Kollerup	Social Democrats
Fiscal Affairs	Jesper Petersen	Social Democrats
Foreign Affairs	Lise Bech	Denmark Democrats
Gender Equality	Ida Auken	Social Democrats
Greenland	Aki-Matilda Høegh-Dam	Siumut
Health	Rasmus Lund-Nielsen	Moderates
Higher Education and Research	Katrine Robsøe	Social Liberals
Housing	Henrik Møller	Social Democrats
Immigration and Integration	Birgitte Vind	Social Democrats
Legal Affairs	Steffen Larsen	Liberal Alliance
Naturalization	Mikkel Bjørn	Danish People's Party
Rural Districts and Islands	Susie Jessen	Denmark Democrats
Scrutineers'	Peter Juel-Jensen	Venstre
Senior Citizens	Kirsten Normann Andersen	Green Left
Small Islands	Kasper Roug	Social Democrats
Social Affairs	Rosa Eriksen	Moderates
Standing Orders	Søren Gade	Venstre
Transport	Rasmus Prehn	Social Democrats

=== Special committees ===
The following parliamentary committees are committees that are not part of the standing committees, but are either select committees or committees whose existence is enshrined in the constitution or other national laws.

Committee	Chair	Chair's party	Notes
Committee on the Danish Council of Ethics	Flemming Møller Mortensen	Social Democrats	Nominates members and oversees the work of the Danish Council of Ethics.
Epidemics	Monika Rubin	Moderates	The committee's scope of work includes the management of publicly dangerous and socially critical diseases, the Epidemics Act, recommendations from the Epidemic Commission and the Danish Health Authority's epidemic management.
Foreign Policy	Michael Aastrup Jensen	Venstre	A special constitutionally mandated committee, that must be consulted by the government "in matters of major importance to foreign policy". The work of the committee is confidential.
Intelligence Services	Jens Henrik Thulesen Dahl	Denmark Democrats	Supervises the Danish Security and Intelligence Service and the Danish Defence Intelligence Service. The work of the committee is confidential.
Scrutiny	Ole Birk Olesen	Liberal Alliance	Has the power to initiate a parliamentary commission of scrutiny.
Subcommittee of the Standing Orders Committee			Handles matters of ministerial responsibility, especially after a commission of inquiry. It assesses findings, hears the minister, and submits a statement or draft report to the Standing Orders Committee, potentially leading to political disapproval or recommending impeachment proceedings if legal liability is found.
Supervisory Board in accordance with Section 71 of the Constitution	Peter Juel-Jensen	Venstre	Oversees non-judicial deprivation of liberty cases, excluding criminal law matters. It receives notifications from various sources, conducts inquiries, and may visit institutions.
