= Kristian Bøgsted =

Danish Politician

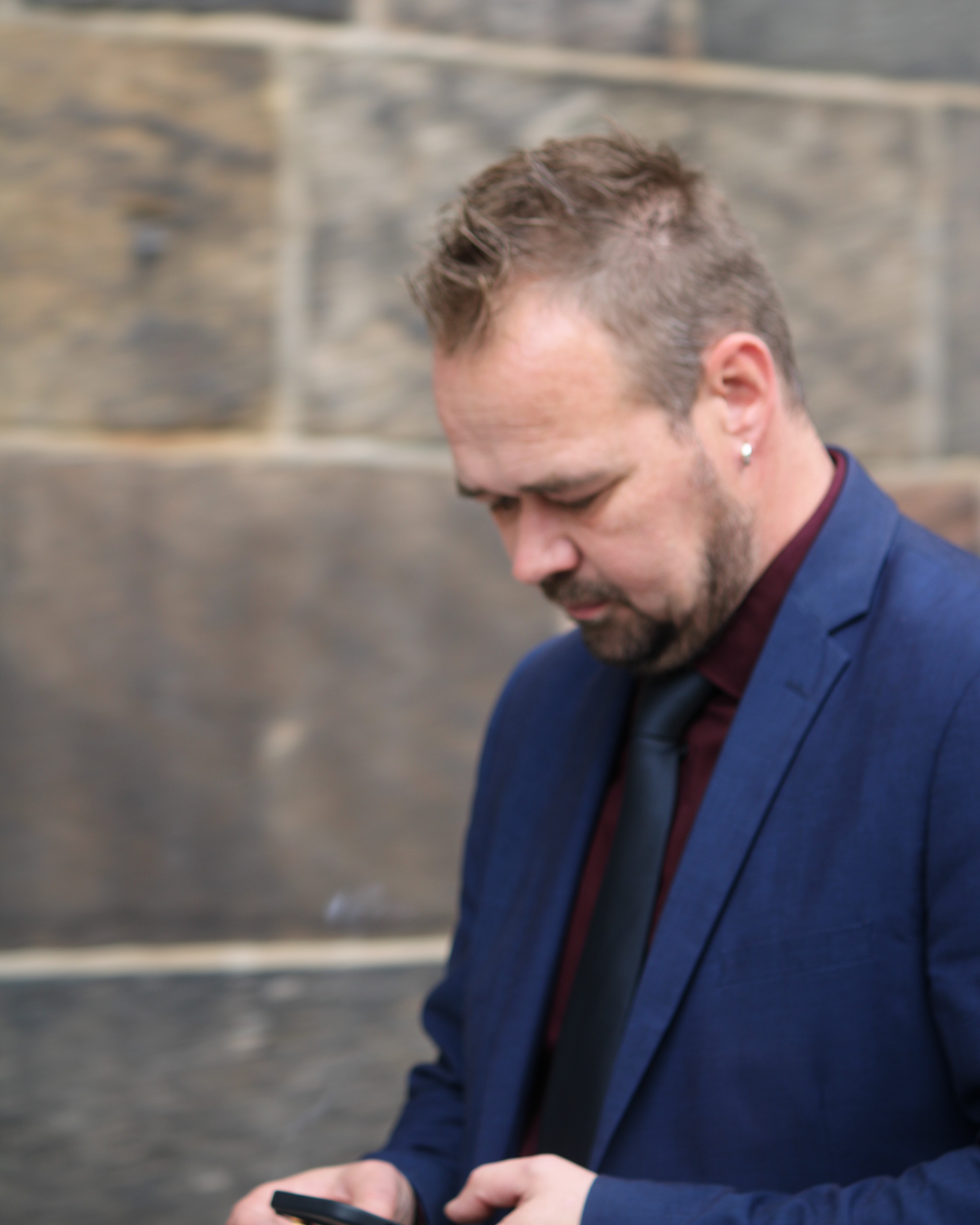
- Bøgsted in 2025

Member of the Folketing
- Incumbent
- Assumed office 1 November 2022
- Constituency: North Jutland

Personal details
- Born: 5 November 1982 (age 43) Skive, Denmark
- Party: Denmark Democrats (2022-)
- Other political affiliations: Danish People's Party (before 2022)

Kristian Bøgsted (born 5 November 1982) is a Danish politician and a member of the Folketing for the Denmark Democrats party. He has represented North Jutland since 2022.

== Biography ==
Bøgsted was born in Skive on 5 November 1982 and is the son of politician and former member of the Folketing Bent Bøgsted. He grew up in Ringkøbing-Skjern municipality. Bøgsted trained as a waiter during college and then worked as a manager for Vestas.

He was elected to the city council of Ringkøbing-Skjern as a member of the Danish People's Party (DPP) and became chairman of the party on the municipal council but lost his seat in the 2021 Danish local elections. He subsequently quit the DPP citing working conditions within the party and Morten Messerschmidt's leadership. He later joined the Denmark Democrats and during the 2022 Danish general election was elected to the Folketing for the party.

Bøgsted lives in No, Denmark and is married with five children.
