= Per Larsen (politician) =

Danish politician

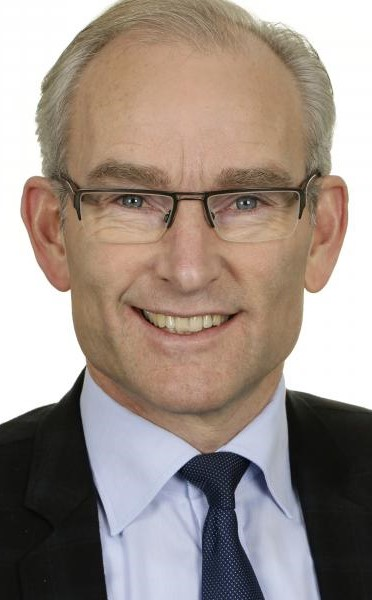
- Larsen in 2019

Member of the Folketing
- In office 5 June 2019 – 24 March 2026
- Constituency: North Jutland

Personal details
- Born: 27 June 1965 (age 61) Jerslev, Denmark
- Party: Conservative People's Party

Per Larsen (born 27 June 1965) is a Danish politician, who was a member of the Folketing for the Conservative People's Party from 2019 to 2026. He was elected into parliament in the 2019 Danish general election, and left parliament in the 2026 Danish general election following the election of Sofie Therese Svendsen in his place.

== Political career ==
Larsen sat in the county council of the North Jutland County from 1998 to 2001. He also sat in the municipal council of Hjørring Municipality from 2002 to 2009. He has been a member of the regional council of Region of North Jutland since 2006.

Larsen was elected into the Folketing in the 2019 election, where he received 1,625 votes.
