= Mohammad Rona =

Afghan-born Danish politician (born 1985)

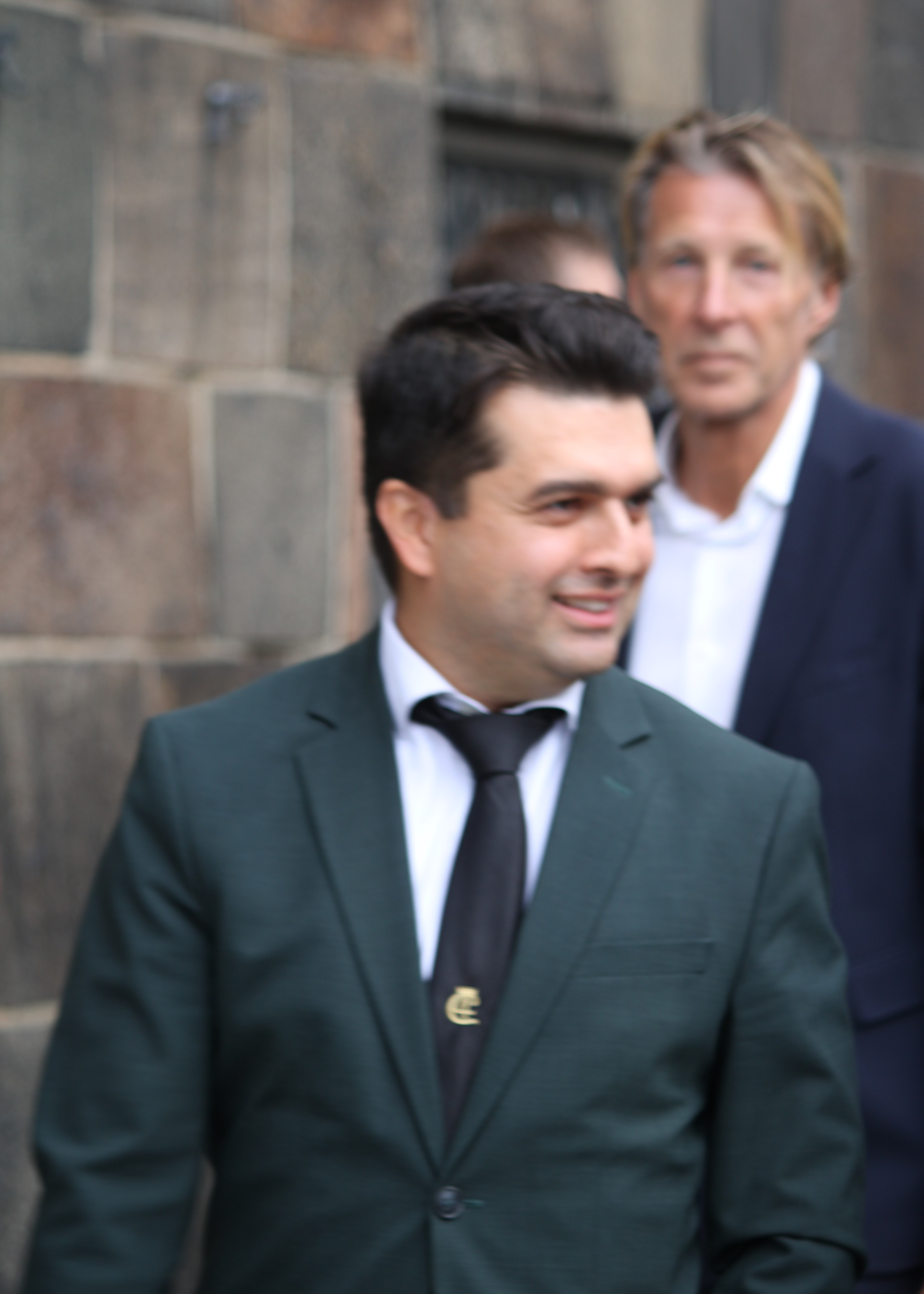
- Rona in 2026

Member of the Folketing
- Incumbent
- Assumed office 23 November 2022
- Preceded by: Kristian Klarskov
- Constituency: North Jutland

Personal details
- Born: 10 January 1985 (age 41) Kabul, Afghanistan
- Party: Moderates
- Occupation: Politician

Mohammad Rona (born 10 January 1985) is an Afghan-born Danish politician and Member of the Folketing for North Jutland from the Moderates. Alongside sixteen other members of The Moderates, Rona was elected to the Folketing in November 2022. He has a Masters in Organization and Management, from Aalborg University.

== See also ==
- List of members of the Folketing, 2022–present
