= Orla Hav =

Danish politician (born 1952)

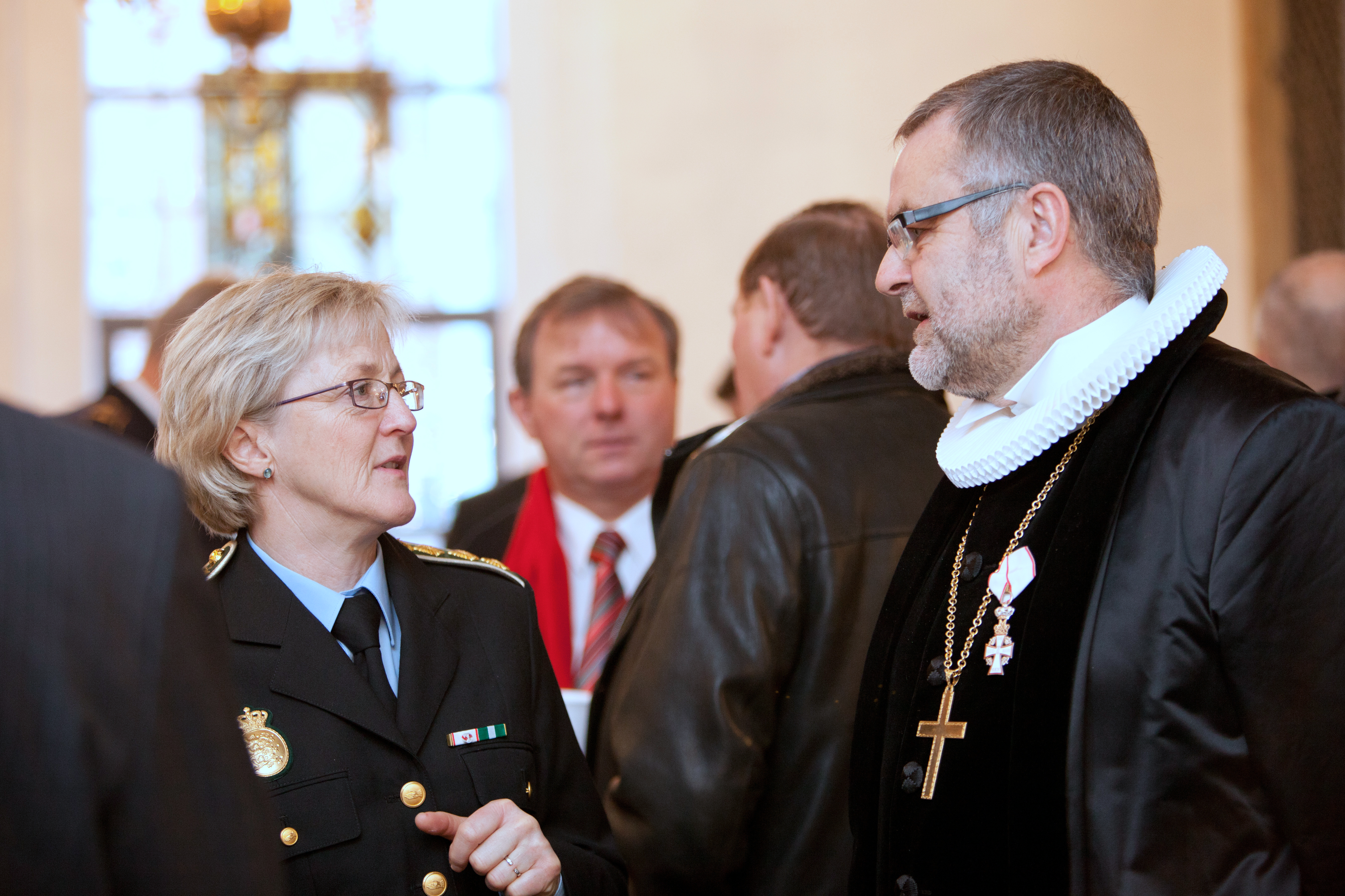

Member of the Folketing
- Incumbent
- Assumed office 13 November 2007
- Constituency: North Jutland

North Jutland Region council chairman
- In office 1 January 2007 – 13 November 2007

Personal details
- Born: 3 April 1952 (age 74) Nørresundby, Denmark
- Party: Social Democrats

Orla Hav (born 3 April 1952) is a Danish politician, who is a member of the Folketing for the Social Democrats political party. He was elected into parliament at the 2007 Danish general election. He has previously acted as regional council chairman of the North Jutland Region.

== Personal life ==
Hav was born on 3 April 1952 in Nørresundby, the son of Kristian Josefsen Hav and Lilly Hav. After graduation he continued his education in Aalborg College of Education from 1972 to 1976 to be a primary school teacher.

== Political career ==
Throughout his life he was involved with various organisations. He has been an active member of the Social Democratic Party since 1965 and North Jutland's County Council since 1983. He was a Member of the Regional Council in North Denmark Region (2006-2007) and Chairman of the Preparatory Committee (2006). He contested the general election in 2007 and won in North Jutland constituency with 29,192 votes, fifth on the list of parliamentary candidates for most votes.

Hav was reelected in the 2011, 2015 and 2019 elections.
