= Theresa Berg Andersen =

Danish politician (born 1979)

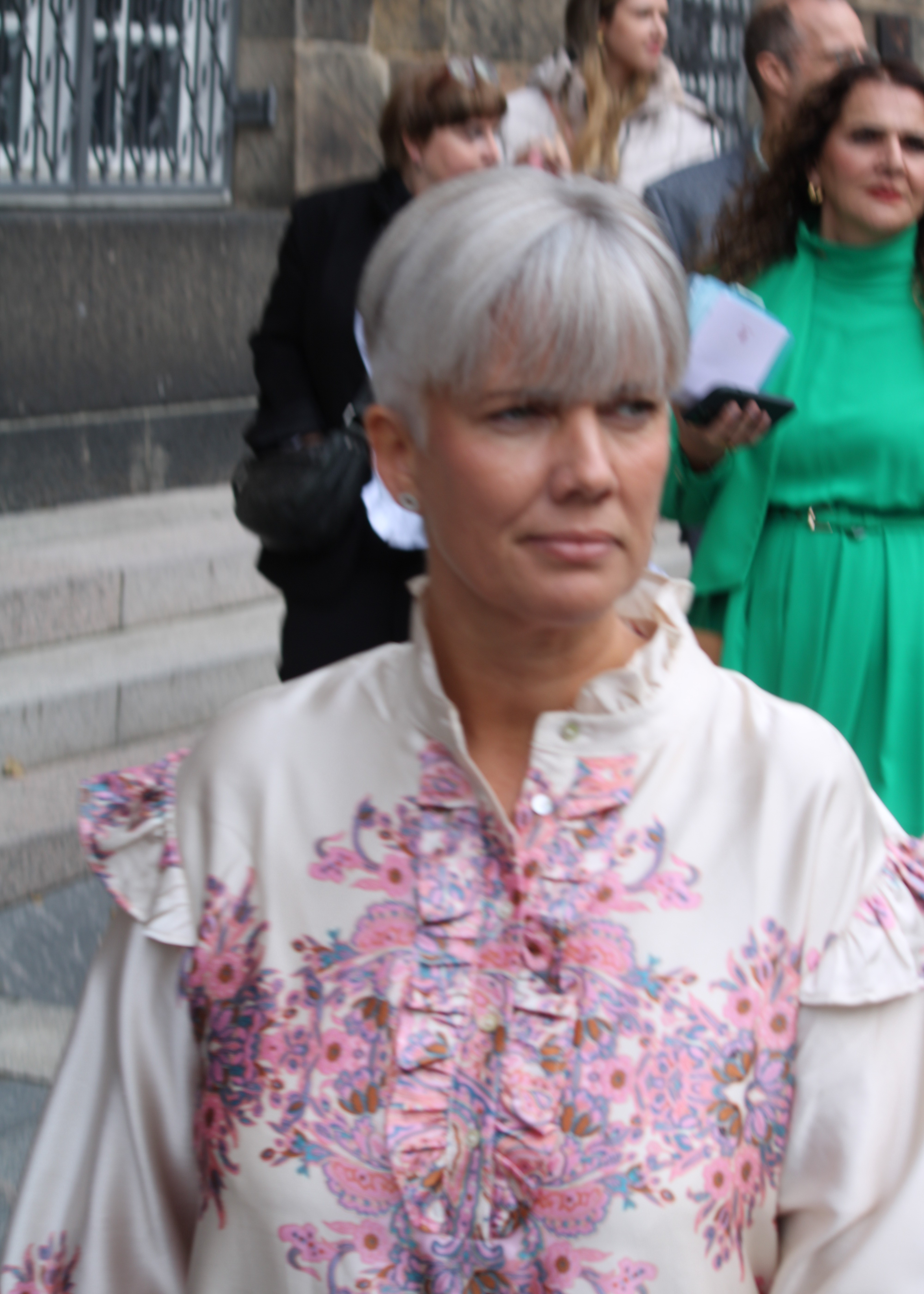
- Berg Andersen in 2025

Member of the Folketing
- Incumbent
- Assumed office 1 November 2022
- Constituency: North Jutland

Personal details
- Born: Theresa Kristensen; 29 December 1979 (age 46) Nibe, Denmark
- Party: Green Left
- Spouse: Thomas Berg Andersen
- Children: 2
- Education: Aarhus University
- Website: sf.dk/politiker/theresa-berg-andersen/

Theresa Berg Andersen (née Kristensen, born 29 December 1979) is a Danish politician and member of the Folketing, the national legislature. A member of the Green Left party, she has represented North Jutland since November 2022. She was also a substitute member of the Folketing for Lisbeth Bech-Nielsen twice: between January 2020 and August 2020; and between December 2020 and August 2021.

Andersen was born on 29 December 1979 in Nibe. She is daughter of radio/TV electrical mechanic Jens Erik Kristensen and Vera E. Bundgaard. She studied social education at Ranum Seminarium (1999–2003) and has a Master of Arts degree in public management from the Aarhus University (2015). She was a supervisor at a day-care facilities in Vesthimmerland Municipality between 2004 and 2022. She was a member of the municipal council in Vesthimmerland from 2014 to 2022 and was first deputy mayor from 2021 in a Venstre led administration.

Andersen is married to Thomas Berg Andersen and has two children: Alberte (b. 2004) and Frida (b. 2005).

Electoral history of Theresa Berg Andersen
Election	Constituency	Party	Votes	Result
2013 local	Vesthimmerland Municipality	Socialist People's Party	193	Elected
2017 local	Vesthimmerland Municipality	Socialist People's Party	1,250	Elected
2019 general	North Jutland	Socialist People's Party	2,516	Not elected
2021 local	Vesthimmerland Municipality	Socialist People's Party	1,861	Elected
2022 general	North Jutland	Green Left	4,115	Elected
2026 general	North Jutland	Green Left	4,623	Elected
