= Anne Honoré Østergaard =

Danish politician (born 1981)

Member of the Folketing
- Incumbent
- Assumed office 5 June 2019
- Constituency: North Jutland

Personal details
- Born: 24 January 1981 (age 45) Aalborg, Denmark
- Party: Venstre

Anne Honoré Østergaard (born 24 January 1981 in Aalborg) is a Danish politician, who is a member of the Folketing for the Venstre political party. She was elected into parliament at the 2019 Danish general election.

== Political career ==
Østergaard has been a member of the municipal council of Aalborg Municipality since 2014. She was elected into parliament at the 2019 election where she received 4,104 votes.
