= Sólbjørg Jakobsen =

Danish jurist and politician (born 1991)

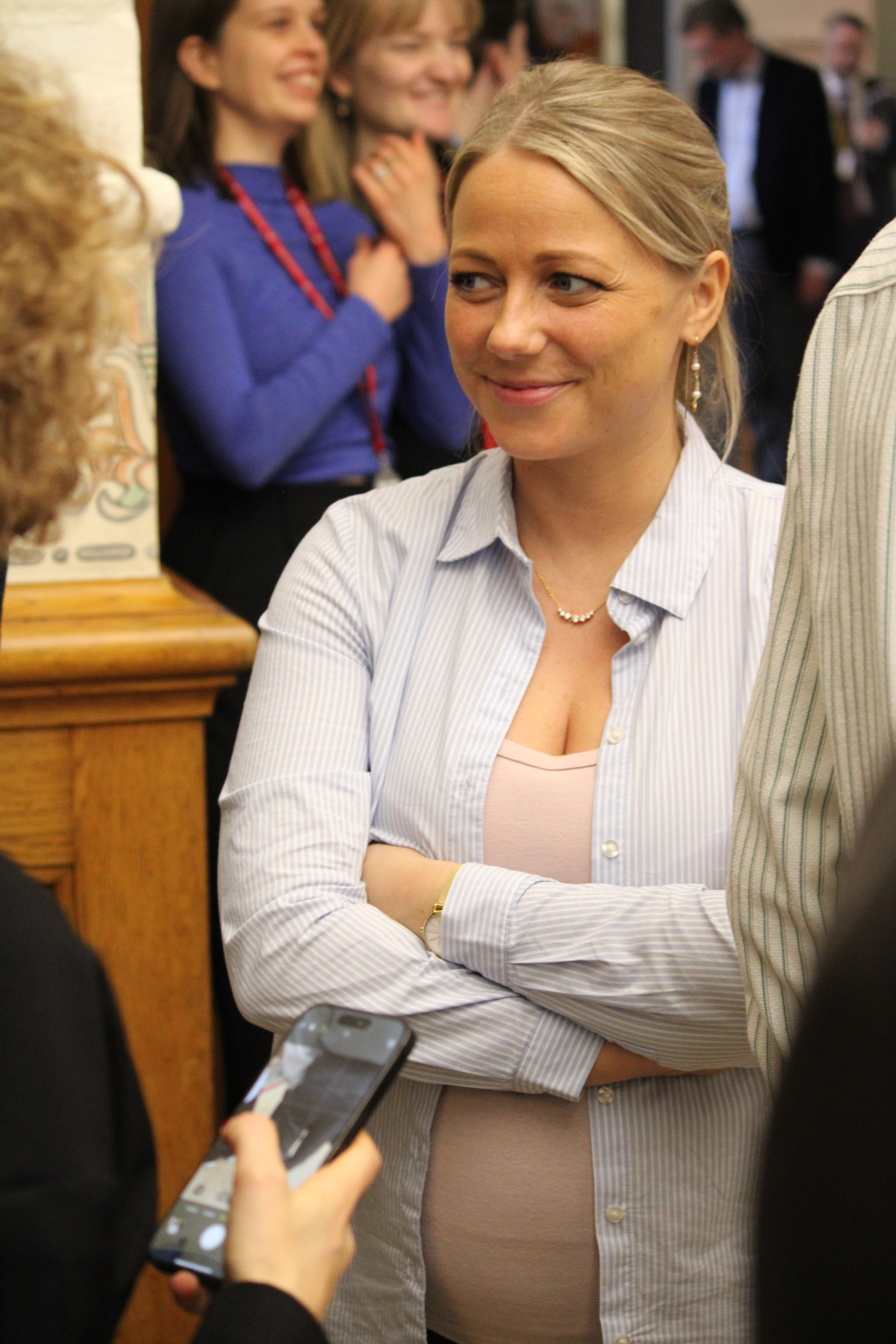
- Jakobsen in 2026

Member of the Folketing
- Incumbent
- Assumed office 1 November 2022
- Constituency: North Jutland

Personal details
- Born: August 8, 1991 (age 35) Tórshavn, Faroe Islands
- Children: 2
- Education: Aalborg University
- Occupation: Jurist

Sólbjørg Jakobsen (born 8 August 1991) is a Faroese-born Danish jurist and politician serving as Member of the Folketing for Liberal Alliance since the 2022 election.

== Career ==
Jakobsen graduated with a Candidate of Law in 2016 from Aalborg University.

Although Jakobsen began her political career with Venstre, she switched to Liberal Alliance in 2019 and has been an active candidate since.

In the 2022 Danish general election, Jakobsen was one of 14 elected members of the party Liberal Alliance. She received 4,421 personal votes in the constituency North Jutland.

== Personal life ==
Jakobsen is engaged and has two children.
