= North Jutland (Folketing constituency) =

Constituency of the Folketing, the national legislature of Denmark

- Nordjylland
- Constituency for the Folketing
- Location of North Jutland within Denmark
- Municipality: List: Aalborg; Brønderslev; Frederikshavn; Hjørring; Jammerbugt; Læsø; Mariagerfjord; Morsø; Rebild; Thisted; Vesthimmerland
- Region: North Jutland
- Population: 593,114 (2026)
- Electorate: 446,598 (2026)
- Area: 7,884 km^{2} (2022)

Current constituency
- Created: 2007
- Seats: List: 14 (2026–present); 15 (2007–2022)
- Members of the Folketing: List: Kim Edberg Andersen (D); Theresa Berg Andersen (F); Christian Friis Bach (B); Lise Bech (Æ); Marie Bjerre (V); Kristian Bøgsted (Æ); Mette Frederiksen (A); Ane Halsboe-Jørgensen (A); Preben Bang Henriksen (V); Per Husted (A); Peder Hvelplund (Ø); Sólbjørg Jakobsen (I); Simon Kollerup (A); Per Larsen (C); Bjarne Laustsen (A); Flemming Møller Mortensen (A); Torsten Schack Pedersen (V); Rasmus Prehn (A); Mohammad Rona (M); Theresa Scavenius (Å); Inger Støjberg (Æ)
- Created from: Aarhus County; North Jutland County; Viborg County

North Jutland (Danish: Nordjylland) is one of the 12 multi-member constituencies of the Folketing, the national legislature of Denmark. The constituency was established in 2007 following the public administration structural reform. It consists of the municipalities of Aalborg, Brønderslev, Frederikshavn, Hjørring, Jammerbugt, Læsø, Mariagerfjord, Morsø, Rebild, Thisted and Vesthimmerland. The constituency currently elects 14 of the 179 members of the Folketing using the open party-list proportional representation electoral system. At the 2026 general election it had 446,598 registered electors.

== Electoral system ==
North Jutland currently elects 14 of the 179 members of the Folketing using the open party-list proportional representation electoral system. Constituency seats are allocated using the D'Hondt method. Compensatory seats are calculated based on the national vote and are allocated using the Sainte-Laguë method, initially at the provincial level and finally at the constituency level. Only parties that reach any one of three thresholds stipulated by section 77 of the Folketing (Parliamentary) Elections Act - winning at least one constituency seat; obtaining at least the Hare quota (valid votes in province/number of constituency seats in province) in two of the three provinces; or obtaining at least 2% of the national vote - compete for compensatory seats.

== Election results ==
=== Summary ===
Election	Red–Green Ø			Green Left F			Alternative Å			Social Democrats A			Social Liberals B			Venstre V			Conservative People's C			Liberal Alliance I / Y			Danish People's O		
Election	Votes	%	Seats	Votes	%	Seats	Votes	%	Seats	Votes	%	Seats	Votes	%	Seats	Votes	%	Seats	Votes	%	Seats	Votes	%	Seats	Votes	%	Seats
2026	13,311	3.63%	0	33,530	9.13%	1	5,084	1.38%	0	102,133	27.82%	5	13,464	3.67%	0	51,681	13.97%	2	19,901	5.42%	1	35,480	9.66%	1	25,175	6.86%	0
2022	10,958	2.96%	0	20,944	5.66%	1	6,844	1.85%	0	125,802	34.01%	7	8,905	2.41%	0	46,369	12.63%	2	16,290	4.40%	0	26,173	7.07%	1	7,117	1.92%	0
2019	15,921	4.35%	0	19,705	5.38%	1	7,268	1.98%	0	124,071	33.86%	6	18,605	5.08%	1	98,372	26.85%	5	18,099	4.94%	1	7,041	1.92%	0	34,734	9.48%	1
2015	22,559	6.10%	1	12,108	3.27%	0	10,335	2.79%	0	110,963	30.01%	5	11,339	3.07%	0	85,924	23.24%	4	10,153	2.75%	0	21,807	5.90%	1	81,160	21.95%	4
2011	16,639	4.43%	0	32,690	8.71%	1				113,739	30.30%	5	25,716	6.85%	1	102,686	27.36%	5	20,171	5.37%	1	15,202	4.05%	0	45,277	12.06%	2
2007	4,082	1.11%	0	37,977	10.29%	2				108,236	29.33%	5	14,406	3.90%	0	94,030	25.48%	4	49,483	13.41%	2	6,582	1.78%	0	50,253	13.62%	2

(Excludes compensatory seats)

=== Detailed ===
==== 2026 ====
Results of the 2026 general election held on 24 March 2026:

Party		Votes per nomination district									Total Votes	%	Seats		
Party		Aalborg East	Aalborg North	Aalborg West	Brønder- slev	Fred- eriks- havn	Himmer- land	Hjørring	Maria- ger- fjord	Thisted	Total Votes	%	Con.	Com.	Tot.
Social Democrats	A	15,044	12,049	11,422	13,604	10,569	9,684	11,898	6,887	10,976	102,133	27.82%	5	0	5
Venstre	V	4,970	4,897	5,577	6,469	4,332	6,875	4,949	2,996	5,304	46,369	12.63%	2	0	2
Denmark Democrats	Æ	3,418	3,205	2,776	7,045	5,301	6,641	5,532	4,920	6,268	45,106	12.29%	2	0	2
Liberal Alliance	I	5,525	4,745	4,961	4,263	2,970	3,657	3,096	2,133	4,130	35,480	9.66%	1	1	2
Green Left	F	6,398	4,342	4,545	3,452	3,631	3,920	2,691	1,944	2,607	33,530	9.13%	1	1	2
Danish People's Party	O	3,408	2,998	2,417	3,611	3,360	2,565	2,823	1,687	2,306	25,175	6.86%	1	0	1
Conservative People's Party	C	3,174	2,429	2,949	1,958	1,673	2,057	2,420	1,705	1,536	19,901	5.42%	1	0	1
Moderates	M	2,799	2,246	2,863	2,137	1,916	1,896	2,009	1,168	1,698	18,732	5.10%	1	0	1
Danish Social Liberal Party	B	3,404	2,231	2,544	966	556	1,265	919	658	921	13,464	3.67%	0	1	1
Red–Green Alliance	Ø	3,326	2,343	2,137	998	714	891	1,210	609	1,083	13,311	3.63%	0	1	1
Citizens' Party	H	888	819	688	1,389	1,756	1,052	1,108	705	1,011	8,835	2.41%	0	0	0
The Alternative	Å	1,081	779	801	437	324	563	404	326	496	5,084	1.38%	0	1	1
Valid votes		53,435	43,083	43,680	46,329	36,398	41,062	39,059	25,738	38,336	367,120	100.00%	14	5	19
Blank votes		658	511	431	499	345	387	375	232	363	3,801	1.02%			
Rejected votes – other		100	103	62	109	141	84	116	59	89	863	0.23%			
Total polled		54,193	43,697	44,173	46,937	36,884	41,533	39,550	26,029	38,788	371,784	83.25%			
Registered electors		65,558	53,313	51,746	55,869	45,375	49,139	47,800	31,365	46,433	446,598				
Turnout		82.66%	81.96%	85.37%	84.01%	81.29%	84.52%	82.74%	82.99%	83.54%	83.25%				

The following candidates were elected:

- Constituency seats - Kim Edberg Andersen (Æ), 1,791 votes; Theresa Berg Andersen (F), 4,623 votes; Lise Bech (Æ), 521 votes; Marie Bjerre (V), 19,961 votes; Mette Frederiksen (A), 41,721 votes; Ane Halsboe-Jørgensen (A), 6,864 votes; Preben Bang Henriksen (V), 15,980 votes; Per Husted (A), 2,221 votes; Sólbjørg Jakobsen (I), 7,618 votes; Thomas Klimek (A), 4,116 votes; Simon Kollerup (A), 9,050 votes; Flemming Møller Mortensen (A), 5,824 votes; Inger Støjberg (Æ), 29,995 votes; Mohammad Rona (M), 1,604 votes; Sofie Therese Svendsen (C), 2,488 votes; and Anders Vistisen (O), 3,580 votes.
- Compensatory seats - Anna Bjerre (Å), 1,194 votes; Steffen Holme Helledie (B), 1,124 votes; Peder Hvelplund (Ø), 4,400 votes; Peter Larsen (I), 1,493 votes; and Christina Lykke (F), 3,620 votes.

==== 2022 ====
Results of the 2022 general election held on 1 November 2022:

Party		Votes per nomination district									Total Votes	%	Seats		
Party		Aalborg East	Aalborg North	Aalborg West	Brønder- slev	Fred- eriks- havn	Himmer- land	Hjørring	Maria- ger- fjord	Thisted	Total Votes	%	Con.	Com.	Tot.
Social Democrats	A	18,201	14,523	13,374	16,803	14,726	11,968	14,049	8,626	13,532	125,802	34.01%	7	0	7
Denmark Democrats	Æ	4,694	4,390	3,975	8,410	6,468	7,872	6,672	6,089	7,586	56,156	15.18%	3	0	3
Venstre	V	6,139	5,732	6,309	6,994	4,748	6,817	5,416	3,047	6,479	51,681	13.97%	2	1	3
Liberal Alliance	I	4,718	3,928	4,074	2,843	2,159	2,424	2,334	1,505	2,188	26,173	7.07%	1	0	1
Moderates	M	3,712	2,924	3,387	2,689	2,289	2,285	2,530	1,368	2,111	23,295	6.30%	1	0	1
Green Left	F	3,881	2,776	3,074	2,094	1,533	2,852	1,915	1,272	1,547	20,944	5.66%	1	0	1
Conservative People's Party	C	2,109	1,628	2,169	1,741	1,429	2,207	2,116	1,317	1,574	16,290	4.40%	0	1	1
The New Right	D	1,250	1,197	1,044	1,985	1,756	1,708	1,667	919	1,275	12,801	3.46%	0	1	1
Red–Green Alliance	Ø	2,508	1,935	1,769	786	658	791	1,018	594	899	10,958	2.96%	0	1	1
Danish Social Liberal Party	B	2,300	1,593	1,728	630	359	821	615	401	458	8,905	2.41%	0	1	1
Danish People's Party	O	789	817	596	1,054	1,012	760	815	474	800	7,117	1.92%	0	0	0
The Alternative	Å	1,611	1,112	1,080	581	346	563	468	385	698	6,844	1.85%	0	1	1
Christian Democrats	K	232	136	125	246	182	147	213	92	270	1,643	0.44%	0	0	0
Independent Greens	Q	395	203	145	41	33	51	49	20	44	981	0.27%	0	0	0
Jette Møller (Independent)		62	50	43	40	30	33	50	27	19	354	0.10%	0	0	0
Valid votes		52,601	42,944	42,892	46,937	37,728	41,299	39,927	26,136	39,480	369,944	100.00%	15	6	21
Blank votes		820	604	502	517	380	423	431	280	346	4,303	1.15%			
Rejected votes – other		108	102	86	122	342	116	133	70	135	1,214	0.32%			
Total polled		53,529	43,650	43,480	47,576	38,450	41,838	40,491	26,486	39,961	375,461	83.89%			
Registered electors		64,511	52,978	50,791	56,046	46,519	49,123	48,489	31,658	47,441	447,556				
Turnout		82.98%	82.39%	85.61%	84.89%	82.65%	85.17%	83.51%	83.66%	84.23%	83.89%				

Votes per municipality:

Party		Votes per municipality											Total Votes
Party		Aalborg	Brønder- slev	Fred- eriks- havn	Hjørring	Jammer- bugt	Læsø	Maria- ger- fjord	Morsø	Rebild	Thisted	Vest- himmer- land	Total Votes
Social Democrats	A	46,098	8,165	14,404	14,049	8,638	322	8,626	4,639	5,854	8,893	6,114	125,802
Denmark Democrats	Æ	13,059	3,911	6,222	6,672	4,499	246	6,089	2,811	3,274	4,775	4,598	56,156
Venstre	V	18,180	3,233	4,565	5,416	3,761	183	3,047	1,947	2,956	4,532	3,861	51,681
Liberal Alliance	I	12,720	1,437	2,109	2,334	1,406	50	1,505	599	1,319	1,589	1,105	26,173
Moderates	M	10,023	1,309	2,213	2,530	1,380	76	1,368	652	1,254	1,459	1,031	23,295
Green Left	F	9,731	1,093	1,472	1,915	1,001	61	1,272	461	1,165	1,086	1,687	20,944
Conservative People's Party	C	5,906	909	1,354	2,116	832	75	1,317	369	1,017	1,205	1,190	16,290
The New Right	D	3,491	912	1,671	1,667	1,073	85	919	367	711	908	997	12,801
Red–Green Alliance	Ø	6,212	412	626	1,018	374	32	594	235	501	664	290	10,958
Danish Social Liberal Party	B	5,621	361	349	615	269	10	401	123	568	335	253	8,905
Danish People's Party	O	2,202	500	954	815	554	58	474	292	250	508	510	7,117
The Alternative	Å	3,803	262	326	468	319	20	385	131	371	567	192	6,844
Christian Democrats	K	493	87	173	213	159	9	92	54	68	216	79	1,643
Independent Greens	Q	743	20	30	49	21	3	20	9	36	35	15	981
Jette Møller (Independent)		155	19	30	50	21	0	27	5	17	14	16	354
Valid votes		138,437	22,630	36,498	39,927	24,307	1,230	26,136	12,694	19,361	26,786	21,938	369,944
Blank votes		1,926	266	366	431	251	14	280	96	213	250	210	4,303
Rejected votes – other		296	37	331	133	85	11	70	46	66	89	50	1,214
Total polled		140,659	22,933	37,195	40,491	24,643	1,255	26,486	12,836	19,640	27,125	22,198	375,461
Registered electors		168,280	26,988	45,045	48,489	29,058	1,474	31,658	15,346	22,265	32,095	26,858	447,556
Turnout		83.59%	84.97%	82.57%	83.51%	84.81%	85.14%	83.66%	83.64%	88.21%	84.51%	82.65%	83.89%

The following candidates were elected:

- Constituency seats - Theresa Berg Andersen (F), 4,115 votes; Lise Bech (Æ), 521 votes; Marie Bjerre (V), 14,050 votes; Kristian Bøgsted (Æ), 480 votes; Mette Frederiksen (A), 60,837 votes; Ane Halsboe-Jørgensen (A), 5,469 votes; Preben Bang Henriksen (V), 15,952 votes; Per Husted (A), 2,221 votes; Sólbjørg Jakobsen (I), 4,421 votes; Kristian Klarskov (M), 1,772 votes; Simon Kollerup (A), 9,947 votes; Bjarne Laustsen (A), 7,601 votes; Flemming Møller Mortensen (A), 6,194 votes; Rasmus Prehn (A), 1,899 votes; and Inger Støjberg (Æ), 47,211 votes.
- Compensatory seats - Kim Edberg Andersen (D), 5,218 votes; Christian Friis Bach (B), 1,489 votes; Peder Hvelplund (Ø), 2,435 votes; Per Larsen (C), 2,384 votes; Torsten Schack Pedersen (V), 6,631 votes; and Theresa Scavenius (Å), 1,081 votes.

==== 2019 ====
Results of the 2019 general election held on 5 June 2019:

Party		Votes per nomination district									Total Votes	%	Seats		
Party		Aalborg East	Aalborg North	Aalborg West	Brønder- slev	Fred- eriks- havn	Himmer- land	Hjørring	Maria- ger- fjord	Thisted	Total Votes	%	Con.	Com.	Tot.
Social Democrats	A	17,918	14,226	12,867	16,301	14,621	11,986	13,147	8,795	14,210	124,071	33.86%	6	1	7
Venstre	V	10,880	9,948	10,979	13,255	9,755	12,830	11,609	7,202	11,914	98,372	26.85%	5	0	5
Danish People's Party	O	3,564	3,391	2,697	5,153	4,741	4,288	4,078	2,787	4,035	34,734	9.48%	1	1	2
Socialist People's Party	F	3,620	2,610	2,722	2,038	1,470	2,588	1,966	1,170	1,521	19,705	5.38%	1	0	1
Danish Social Liberal Party	B	4,040	2,766	2,994	1,665	1,101	1,845	1,558	1,270	1,366	18,605	5.08%	1	0	1
Conservative People's Party	C	2,020	1,739	2,171	2,067	1,811	2,199	2,518	1,384	2,190	18,099	4.94%	1	0	1
Red–Green Alliance	Ø	3,291	2,479	2,328	1,370	1,251	1,217	1,550	968	1,467	15,921	4.35%	0	1	1
The New Right	D	835	790	734	1,117	1,036	871	976	483	600	7,442	2.03%	0	0	0
The Alternative	Å	1,650	1,198	1,134	665	457	598	572	376	618	7,268	1.98%	0	1	1
Liberal Alliance	I	1,365	1,185	1,107	786	464	604	504	494	532	7,041	1.92%	0	0	0
Hard Line	P	930	770	593	799	812	677	756	407	599	6,343	1.73%	0	0	0
Christian Democrats	K	805	492	489	738	686	597	665	369	890	5,731	1.56%	0	0	0
Klaus Riskær Pedersen	E	513	384	401	400	293	307	289	207	270	3,064	0.84%	0	0	0
Valid votes		51,431	41,978	41,216	46,354	38,498	40,607	40,188	25,912	40,212	366,396	100.00%	15	4	19
Blank votes		450	354	342	348	261	289	296	207	235	2,782	0.75%			
Rejected votes – other		109	91	69	98	211	82	124	47	84	915	0.25%			
Total polled		51,990	42,423	41,627	46,800	38,970	40,978	40,608	26,166	40,531	370,093	83.18%			
Registered electors		62,421	51,995	48,695	56,101	47,711	49,095	48,991	31,745	48,197	444,951				
Turnout		83.29%	81.59%	85.49%	83.42%	81.68%	83.47%	82.89%	82.43%	84.09%	83.18%				

Votes per municipality:

Party		Votes per municipality											Total Votes
Party		Aalborg	Brønder- slev	Fred- eriks- havn	Hjørring	Jammer- bugt	Læsø	Maria- ger- fjord	Morsø	Rebild	Thisted	Vest- himmer- land	Total Votes
Social Democrats	A	45,011	7,910	14,268	13,147	8,391	353	8,795	4,938	5,842	9,272	6,144	124,071
Venstre	V	31,807	6,254	9,439	11,609	7,001	316	7,202	4,084	5,674	7,830	7,156	98,372
Danish People's Party	O	9,652	2,464	4,513	4,078	2,689	228	2,787	1,252	1,710	2,783	2,578	34,734
Socialist People's Party	F	8,952	1,041	1,425	1,966	997	45	1,170	460	960	1,061	1,628	19,705
Danish Social Liberal Party	B	9,800	850	1,065	1,558	815	36	1,270	382	1,120	984	725	18,605
Conservative People's Party	C	5,930	1,047	1,734	2,518	1,020	77	1,384	494	899	1,696	1,300	18,099
Red–Green Alliance	Ø	8,098	717	1,181	1,550	653	70	968	425	672	1,042	545	15,921
The New Right	D	2,359	431	1,017	976	686	19	483	176	339	424	532	7,442
The Alternative	Å	3,982	308	442	572	357	15	376	152	384	466	214	7,268
Liberal Alliance	I	3,657	378	454	504	408	10	494	139	361	393	243	7,041
Hard Line	P	2,293	419	794	756	380	18	407	215	246	384	431	6,343
Christian Democrats	K	1,786	347	661	665	391	25	369	213	261	677	336	5,731
Klaus Riskær Pedersen	E	1,298	201	284	289	199	9	207	88	151	182	156	3,064
Valid votes		134,625	22,367	37,277	40,188	23,987	1,221	25,912	13,018	18,619	27,194	21,988	366,396
Blank votes		1,146	185	254	296	163	7	207	82	133	153	156	2,782
Rejected votes – other		269	45	210	124	53	1	47	27	37	57	45	915
Total polled		136,040	22,597	37,741	40,608	24,203	1,229	26,166	13,127	18,789	27,404	22,189	370,093
Registered electors		163,111	26,974	46,217	48,991	29,127	1,494	31,745	15,722	21,692	32,475	27,403	444,951
Turnout		83.40%	83.77%	81.66%	82.89%	83.09%	82.26%	82.43%	83.49%	86.62%	84.38%	80.97%	83.18%

The following candidates were elected:

- Constituency seats - Lisbeth Bech-Nielsen (F), 2,645 votes; Marie Bjerre (V), 12,699 votes; Bent Bøgsted (O), 3,418 votes; Mette Frederiksen (A), 55,935 votes; Anne Honoré Østergaard (V), 6,651 votes; Orla Hav (A), 7,383 votes; Preben Bang Henriksen (V), 28,599 votes; Marianne Jelved (B), 2,657 votes; Simon Kollerup (A), 13,157 votes; Per Larsen (C), 3,209 votes; Karsten Lauritzen (V), 26,882 votes; Bjarne Laustsen (A), 15,407 votes; Flemming Møller Mortensen (A), 9,129 votes; Torsten Schack Pedersen (V), 11,276 votes; and Rasmus Prehn (A), 7,354 votes
- Compensatory seats - Lise Bech (O), 2,306 votes; Ane Halsboe-Jørgensen (A), 6,351 votes; Peder Hvelplund (Ø), 2,991 votes; and Susanne Zimmer (Å), 774 votes.

==== 2015 ====
Results of the 2015 general election held on 18 June 2015:

Party		Votes per nomination district									Total Votes	%	Seats		
Party		Aalborg East	Aalborg North	Aalborg West	Brønder- slev	Fred- eriks- havn	Himmer- land	Hjørring	Maria- ger- fjord	Thisted	Total Votes	%	Con.	Com.	Tot.
Social Democrats	A	15,854	12,630	11,899	14,351	12,810	10,810	11,542	7,757	13,310	110,963	30.01%	5	1	6
Venstre	V	8,820	8,454	9,728	11,776	8,887	10,830	9,766	6,160	11,503	85,924	23.24%	4	0	4
Danish People's Party	O	8,807	7,705	6,782	11,269	10,777	10,409	9,871	6,479	9,061	81,160	21.95%	4	0	4
Red–Green Alliance	Ø	4,284	3,131	3,055	2,342	2,133	1,833	2,329	1,427	2,025	22,559	6.10%	1	0	1
Liberal Alliance	I	3,651	3,027	3,356	2,385	1,788	2,396	1,934	1,504	1,766	21,807	5.90%	1	0	1
Socialist People's Party	F	2,108	1,485	1,579	1,513	1,068	1,198	1,519	805	833	12,108	3.27%	0	1	1
Danish Social Liberal Party	B	2,278	1,628	1,796	1,044	801	1,203	1,070	761	758	11,339	3.07%	0	1	1
The Alternative	Å	1,964	1,445	1,613	1,048	729	928	963	714	931	10,335	2.79%	0	1	1
Conservative People's Party	C	974	862	1,102	1,159	823	1,427	2,214	589	1,003	10,153	2.75%	0	0	0
Christian Democrats	K	572	341	255	423	362	303	384	195	495	3,330	0.90%	0	0	0
Hans Schultz (Independent)		9	10	15	11	7	14	9	17	4	96	0.03%	0	0	0
Valid votes		49,321	40,718	41,180	47,321	40,185	41,351	41,601	26,408	41,689	369,774	100.00%	15	4	19
Blank votes		522	396	374	402	261	323	304	244	272	3,098	0.83%			
Rejected votes – other		177	115	138	84	115	99	119	42	129	1,018	0.27%			
Total polled		50,020	41,229	41,692	47,807	40,561	41,773	42,024	26,694	42,090	373,890	84.83%			
Registered electors		59,464	49,667	48,302	55,845	48,287	48,893	49,589	31,709	49,008	440,764				
Turnout		84.12%	83.01%	86.32%	85.61%	84.00%	85.44%	84.74%	84.18%	85.88%	84.83%				

Votes per municipality:

Party		Votes per municipality											Total Votes
Party		Aalborg	Brønder- slev	Fred- eriks- havn	Hjørring	Jammer- bugt	Læsø	Maria- ger- fjord	Morsø	Rebild	Thisted	Vest- himmer- land	Total Votes
Social Democrats	A	40,383	6,692	12,460	11,542	7,659	350	7,757	4,681	5,172	8,629	5,638	110,963
Venstre	V	27,002	5,536	8,590	9,766	6,240	297	6,160	3,624	4,661	7,879	6,169	85,924
Danish People's Party	O	23,294	5,129	10,409	9,871	6,140	368	6,479	2,992	4,122	6,069	6,287	81,160
Red–Green Alliance	Ø	10,470	1,283	2,066	2,329	1,059	67	1,427	637	897	1,388	936	22,559
Liberal Alliance	I	10,034	1,145	1,746	1,934	1,240	42	1,504	585	1,247	1,181	1,149	21,807
Socialist People's Party	F	5,172	870	1,041	1,519	643	27	805	265	531	568	667	12,108
Danish Social Liberal Party	B	5,702	550	776	1,070	494	25	761	233	730	525	473	11,339
The Alternative	Å	5,022	481	694	963	567	35	714	249	515	682	413	10,335
Conservative People's Party	C	2,938	685	806	2,214	474	17	589	214	477	789	950	10,153
Christian Democrats	K	1,168	228	343	384	195	19	195	97	124	398	179	3,330
Hans Schultz (Independent)		34	6	7	9	5	0	17	1	5	3	5	92
Valid votes		131,219	22,605	38,938	41,601	24,716	1,247	26,408	13,578	18,481	28,111	22,866	369,770
Blank votes		1,292	233	255	304	169	6	244	82	146	190	177	3,098
Rejected votes – other		430	45	111	119	39	4	42	42	45	87	58	1,022
Total polled		132,941	22,883	39,304	42,024	24,924	1,257	26,694	13,702	18,672	28,388	23,101	373,890
Registered electors		157,433	26,719	46,797	49,589	29,126	1,490	31,709	16,044	21,190	32,964	27,703	440,764
Turnout		84.44%	85.64%	83.99%	84.74%	85.57%	84.36%	84.18%	85.40%	88.12%	86.12%	83.39%	84.83%

The following candidates were elected:

- Constituency seats - Lise Bech (O), 12,951 votes; Bent Bøgsted (O), 21,534 votes; Stine Brix (Ø), 8,474 votes; Christina Egelund (I), 8,468 votes; Søren Gade (V), 37,804 votes; Ane Halsboe-Jørgensen (A), 12,755 votes; Orla Hav (A), 21,217 votes; Preben Bang Henriksen (V), 13,896 votes; Simon Kollerup (A), 13,839 votes; Karsten Lauritzen (V), 10,507 votes; Bjarne Laustsen (A), 26,026 votes; Morten Marinus (O), 13,021 votes; Flemming Møller Mortensen (A), 12,241 votes; Torsten Schack Pedersen (V), 7,974 votes; and Ib Poulsen (O), 7,881 votes.
- Compensatory seats - Torsten Gejl (Å), 5,945 votes; Marianne Jelved (B), 4,358 votes; Lisbeth Bech Poulsen (F), 3,992 votes; and Rasmus Prehn (A), 9,850 votes.

==== 2011 ====
Results of the 2011 general election held on 15 September 2011:

Party		Votes per nomination district									Total Votes	%	Seats		
Party		Aalborg East	Aalborg North	Aalborg West	Brønder- slev	Fred- eriks- havn	Himmer- land	Hjørring	Maria- ger- fjord	Thisted	Total Votes	%	Con.	Com.	Tot.
Social Democrats	A	15,895	12,955	11,508	15,237	14,069	10,528	12,017	8,227	13,303	113,739	30.30%	5	1	6
Venstre	V	9,924	9,569	10,875	13,707	11,560	13,516	12,521	7,856	13,158	102,686	27.36%	5	0	5
Danish People's Party	O	5,025	4,566	3,958	6,051	5,869	5,342	5,105	3,522	5,839	45,277	12.06%	2	0	2
Socialist People's Party	F	5,378	3,684	3,848	3,938	3,227	4,032	3,915	1,964	2,704	32,690	8.71%	1	1	2
Danish Social Liberal Party	B	4,205	3,318	3,735	2,861	1,970	2,793	2,665	1,715	2,454	25,716	6.85%	1	0	1
Conservative People's Party	C	2,240	2,092	2,561	2,635	1,876	2,419	3,046	1,311	1,991	20,171	5.37%	1	0	1
Red–Green Alliance	Ø	3,220	2,405	2,368	1,658	1,456	1,292	1,679	979	1,582	16,639	4.43%	0	1	1
Liberal Alliance	I	2,069	1,846	1,991	1,838	1,403	1,833	1,585	1,189	1,448	15,202	4.05%	0	1	1
Christian Democrats	K	351	261	233	440	310	349	377	233	573	3,127	0.83%	0	0	0
Hans Schultz (Independent)		26	22	11	19	8	13	14	7	12	132	0.04%	0	0	0
Valid votes		48,333	40,718	41,088	48,384	41,748	42,117	42,924	27,003	43,064	375,379	100.00%	15	4	19
Blank votes		296	216	239	294	171	251	259	200	271	2,197	0.58%			
Rejected votes – other		112	105	94	119	155	100	82	52	119	938	0.25%			
Total polled		48,741	41,039	41,421	48,797	42,074	42,468	43,265	27,255	43,454	378,514	86.58%			
Registered electors		56,408	47,942	47,057	55,835	49,167	48,974	50,101	31,830	49,866	437,180				
Turnout		86.41%	85.60%	88.02%	87.40%	85.57%	86.72%	86.36%	85.63%	87.14%	86.58%				

Votes per municipality:

Party		Votes per municipality											Total Votes
Party		Aalborg	Brønder- slev	Fred- eriks- havn	Hjørring	Jammer- bugt	Læsø	Maria- ger- fjord	Morsø	Rebild	Thisted	Vest- himmer- land	Total Votes
Social Democrats	A	40,358	7,184	13,692	12,017	8,053	377	8,227	4,850	5,138	8,453	5,390	113,739
Venstre	V	30,368	6,607	11,178	12,521	7,100	382	7,856	4,127	5,595	9,031	7,921	102,686
Danish People's Party	O	13,549	2,714	5,613	5,105	3,337	256	3,522	1,749	2,120	4,090	3,222	45,277
Socialist People's Party	F	12,910	1,921	3,134	3,915	2,017	93	1,964	937	1,469	1,767	2,563	32,690
Danish Social Liberal Party	B	11,258	1,467	1,891	2,665	1,394	79	1,715	766	1,438	1,688	1,355	25,716
Conservative People's Party	C	6,893	1,358	1,827	3,046	1,277	49	1,311	499	1,037	1,492	1,382	20,171
Red–Green Alliance	Ø	7,993	846	1,393	1,679	812	63	979	517	668	1,065	624	16,639
Liberal Alliance	I	5,906	943	1,366	1,585	895	37	1,189	581	916	867	917	15,202
Christian Democrats	K	845	208	301	377	232	9	233	125	129	448	220	3,127
Hans Schultz (Independent)		59	10	8	14	9	0	7	4	6	8	7	132
Valid votes		130,139	23,258	40,403	42,924	25,126	1,345	27,003	14,155	18,516	28,909	23,601	375,379
Blank votes		751	143	168	259	151	3	200	92	97	179	154	2,197
Rejected votes – other		311	56	150	82	63	5	52	38	41	81	59	938
Total polled		131,201	23,457	40,721	43,265	25,340	1,353	27,255	14,285	18,654	29,169	23,814	378,514
Registered electors		151,407	26,716	47,593	50,101	29,119	1,574	31,830	16,392	20,995	33,474	27,979	437,180
Turnout		86.65%	87.80%	85.56%	86.36%	87.02%	85.96%	85.63%	87.15%	88.85%	87.14%	85.11%	86.58%

The following candidates were elected:

- Constituency seats - Pernille Vigsø Bagge (F), 19,543 votes; Bent Bøgsted (O), 14,273 votes; Lene Espersen (C), 14,591 votes; Orla Hav (A), 29,286 votes; Preben Bang Henriksen (V), 12,681 votes; Marianne Jelved (B), 12,479 votes; Morten Marinus Jørgensen (O), 6,798 votes; Birgitte Josefsen (V), 11,582 votes; Simon Kollerup (A), 13,145 votes; Karsten Lauritzen (V), 26,045 votes; Bjarne Laustsen (A), 28,873 votes; Flemming Møller Mortensen (A), 10,624 votes; Tina Nedergaard (V), 15,264 votes; Torsten Schack Pedersen (V), 13,867 votes; and Rasmus Prehn (A), 9,690 votes.
- Compensatory seats - Stine Maiken Brix (Ø), 4,873 votes; Thyra Frank (I), 9,004 votes; Ane Halsboe-Jørgensen (A), 8,246 votes; and Lisbeth Bech Poulsen (F), 3,113 votes.

==== 2007 ====
Results of the 2007 general election held on 13 November 2007:

Party		Votes per nomination district									Total Votes	%	Seats		
Party		Aalborg East	Aalborg North	Aalborg West	Brønder- slev	Fred- eriks- havn	Himmer- land	Hjørring	Maria- ger- fjord	Thisted	Total Votes	%	Con.	Com.	Tot.
Social Democrats	A	16,081	13,032	11,472	14,134	13,193	9,690	11,604	7,478	11,552	108,236	29.33%	5	1	6
Venstre	V	8,492	8,135	8,827	13,298	10,846	12,350	11,013	7,647	13,422	94,030	25.48%	4	1	5
Danish People's Party	O	5,928	5,118	4,456	6,718	6,926	5,567	5,602	3,798	6,140	50,253	13.62%	2	1	3
Conservative People's Party	C	5,471	5,011	6,360	5,914	4,731	6,979	6,832	3,429	4,756	49,483	13.41%	2	1	3
Socialist People's Party	F	6,140	4,617	4,895	4,273	3,382	3,961	4,182	2,540	3,987	37,977	10.29%	2	0	2
Danish Social Liberal Party	B	2,195	1,763	2,132	1,443	1,125	1,513	1,596	974	1,665	14,406	3.90%	0	1	1
New Alliance	Y	965	800	850	729	568	826	680	516	648	6,582	1.78%	0	0	0
Unity List	Ø	801	655	660	340	288	363	352	222	401	4,082	1.11%	0	0	0
Christian Democrats	K	393	328	254	623	404	449	442	254	698	3,845	1.04%	0	0	0
Anders Gravers Pedersen (Independent)		21	12	5	6	4	7	6	5	7	73	0.02%	0	0	0
Hans Schultz (Independent)		2	4	5	2	2	3	4	2	2	26	0.01%	0	0	0
Valid votes		46,489	39,475	39,916	47,480	41,469	41,708	42,313	26,865	43,278	368,993	100.00%	15	5	20
Blank votes		204	188	185	221	146	164	160	115	214	1,597	0.43%			
Rejected votes – other		102	83	93	92	106	118	128	61	111	894	0.24%			
Total polled		46,795	39,746	40,194	47,793	41,721	41,990	42,601	27,041	43,603	371,484	85.31%			
Registered electors		55,052	46,925	46,357	55,671	49,814	49,114	50,196	31,653	50,654	435,436				
Turnout		85.00%	84.70%	86.71%	85.85%	83.75%	85.49%	84.87%	85.43%	86.08%	85.31%				

Votes per municipality:

Party		Votes per municipality											Total Votes
Party		Aalborg	Brønder- slev	Fred- eriks- havn	Hjørring	Jammer- bugt	Læsø	Maria- ger- fjord	Morsø	Rebild	Thisted	Vest- himmer- land	Total Votes
Social Democrats	A	40,585	6,793	12,822	11,604	7,341	371	7,478	4,167	4,754	7,385	4,936	108,236
Venstre	V	25,454	6,451	10,441	11,013	6,847	405	7,647	4,299	5,395	9,123	6,955	94,030
Danish People's Party	O	15,502	3,087	6,663	5,602	3,631	263	3,798	1,997	2,307	4,143	3,260	50,253
Conservative People's Party	C	16,842	2,841	4,621	6,832	3,073	110	3,429	1,436	2,435	3,320	4,544	49,483
Socialist People's Party	F	15,652	2,060	3,273	4,182	2,213	109	2,540	1,295	1,573	2,692	2,388	37,977
Danish Social Liberal Party	B	6,090	710	1,079	1,596	733	46	974	591	842	1,074	671	14,406
New Alliance	Y	2,615	370	542	680	359	26	516	200	439	448	387	6,582
Unity List	Ø	2,116	178	269	352	162	19	222	108	211	293	152	4,082
Christian Democrats	K	975	263	376	442	360	28	254	135	172	563	277	3,845
Anders Gravers Pedersen (Independent)		38	2	4	6	4	0	5	3	5	4	2	73
Hans Schultz (Independent)		11	2	2	4	0	0	2	2	3	0	0	26
Valid votes		125,880	22,757	40,092	42,313	24,723	1,377	26,865	14,233	18,136	29,045	23,572	368,993
Blank votes		577	116	144	160	105	2	115	82	76	132	88	1,597
Rejected votes – other		278	38	102	128	54	4	61	36	37	75	81	894
Total polled		126,735	22,911	40,338	42,601	24,882	1,383	27,041	14,351	18,249	29,252	23,741	371,484
Registered electors		148,334	26,595	48,208	50,196	29,076	1,606	31,653	16,795	20,815	33,859	28,299	435,436
Turnout		85.44%	86.15%	83.67%	84.87%	85.58%	86.11%	85.43%	85.45%	87.67%	86.39%	83.89%	85.31%

The following candidates were elected:

- Constituency seats - Pernille Vigsø Bagge (F), 20,377 votes; Bent Bøgsted (O), 19,406 votes; Karl H. Bornhøft (F), 5,913 votes; Ole Vagn Christensen (A), 10,281 votes; Lene Espersen (C), 33,464 votes; Lene Hansen (A), 6,432 votes; Orla Hav (A), 44,848 votes; Birgitte Josefsen (V), 16,448 votes; Anita Knakkergaard (O), 8,152 votes; Karsten Lauritzen (V), 10,354 votes; Bjarne Laustsen (A), 23,757 votes; Tina Nedergaard (V), 18,685 votes; Jakob Axel Nielsen (C), 8,182 votes; Torsten Schack Pedersen (V), 13,583 votes; and Rasmus Prehn (A), 7,165 votes.
- Compensatory seats - Per Bisgaard (V), 8,737 votes; Marianne Jelved (B), 8,276 votes; Knud Kristensen (C), 3,906 votes; Flemming Møller Mortensen (A), 4,191 votes; and Ib Poulsen (O), 5,289 votes.
