= Kim Edberg Andersen =

Danish politician (born 1973)

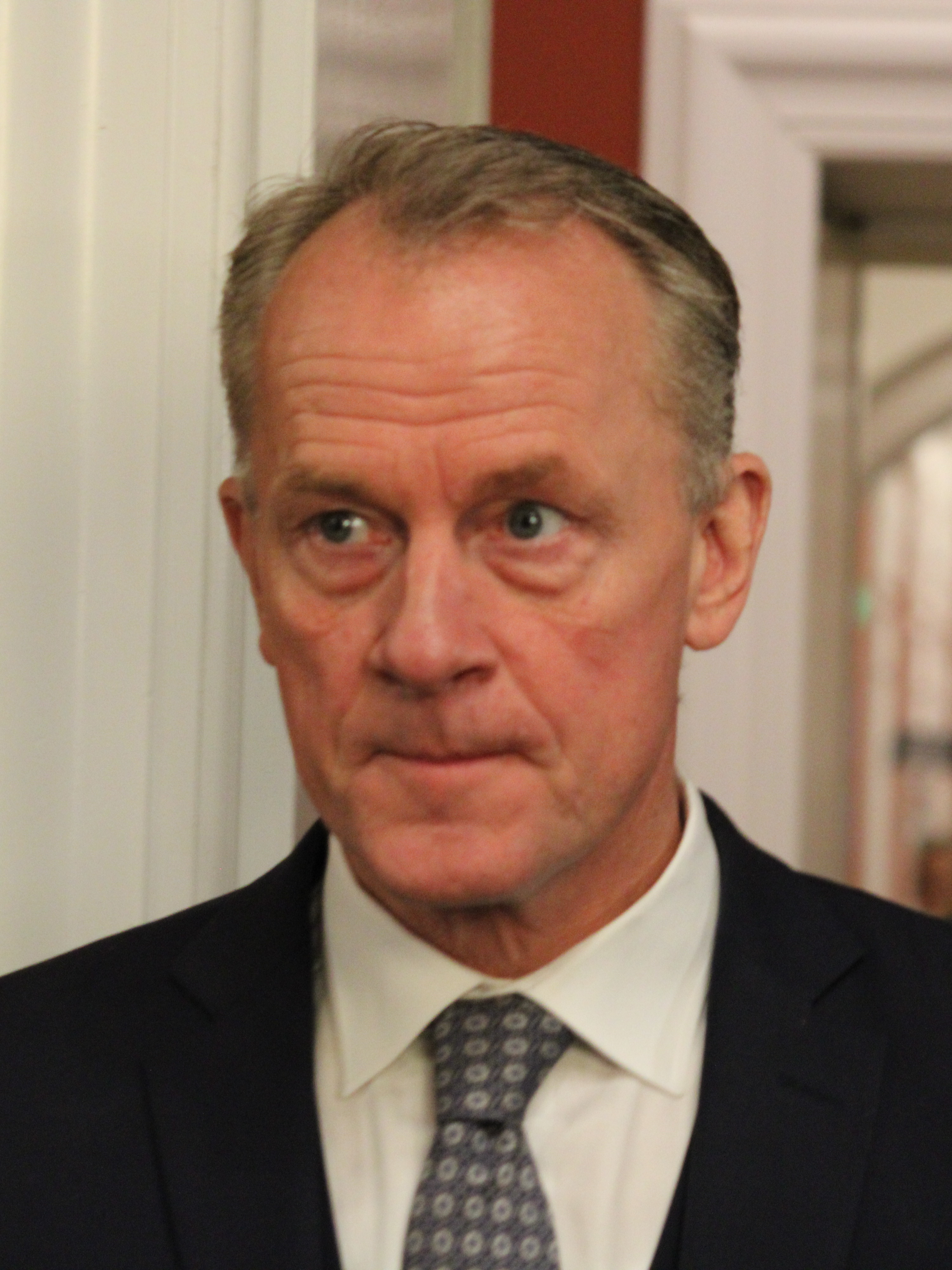
- Edberg Andersen in 2025

Member of the Folketing
- Incumbent
- Assumed office 1 November 2022
- Constituency: North Jutland

Personal details
- Born: 21 June 1973 (age 52) Denmark
- Party: Denmark Democrats (2024–present)
- Other political affiliations: Danish People's Party (until 2021); New Right (2021–2024)

Kim Edberg Andersen-Kristoffersen (born 21 June 1973) is a Danish politician and a Member of the Folketing since 2022.

Edberg completed a degree in business studies at Aalborg University. He was a member of the Danish People's Party and had been a councilor for the party in Rebild Municipality and stood as a candidate for the DPP during the 2019 Danish general election before resigning in 2021. He joined New Right the same year and was elected to the Folketing in the 2022 Danish general election for the North Jutland constituency.

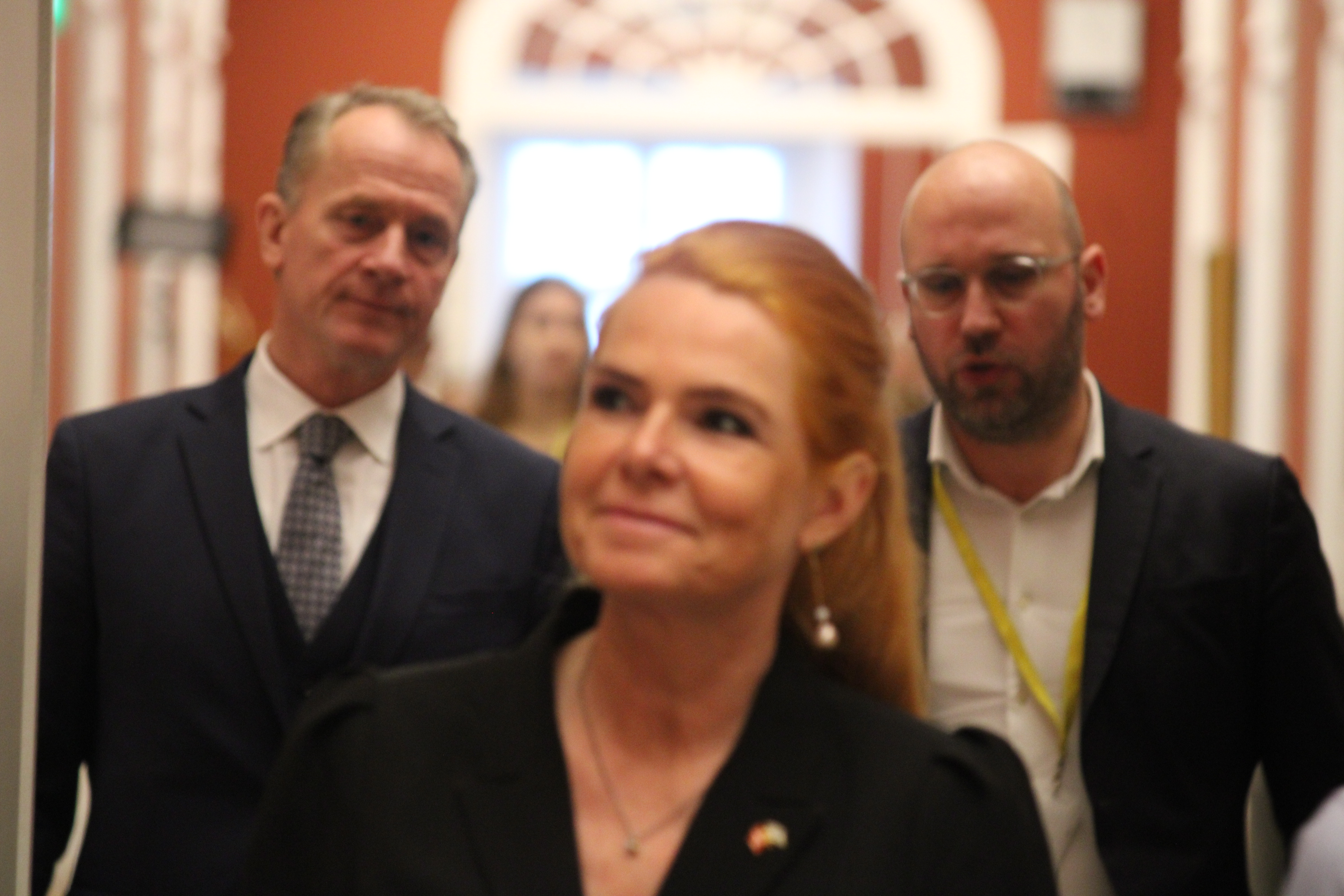
Edberg Andersen at Christiansborg with party leader Inger Støjberg, 9 December 2025

Two months after Pernille Vermund recommended the dissolution of Nye Borgerlige, Edberg joined the Denmark Democrats on 19 March 2024.
