= Per Husted =

Danish politician (born 1966)

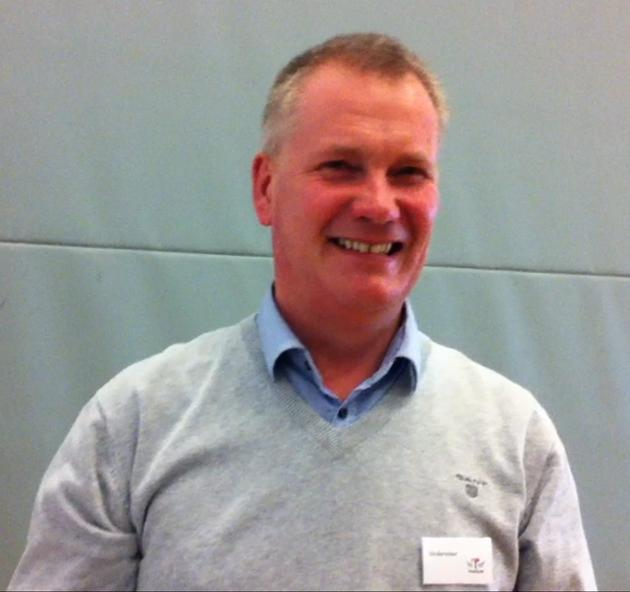
- Husted in October 2013

Member of the Folketing
- In office 1 November 2022 – 24 March 2026
- Constituency: North Jutland
- In office 1 January 2010 – 15 September 2011
- Preceded by: Lene Hansen
- Constituency: North Jutland

Personal details
- Born: 6 April 1966 (age 60) Kolding, Denmark
- Party: Social Democrats
- Education: Copenhagen Business School

Per Husted Nielsen (born 6 April 1966) is a Danish politician and former Member of the Folketing. A Social Democrat, he represented North Jutland from January 2010 to September 2011, and from November 2022 to March 2026. He was a substitute member of the Folketing on several occasions.

Husted was born on 6 April 1966 in Kolding. He was educated at Munkensdam Upper Secondary School and Kolding Købmandsskole. He has a Master of Science degree in economics and business administration from Copenhagen Business School (1993). He was Trade Promotion Officer for the Hadsund Trade Council from 1996 to 2006. He taught at Tradium Business School and Tradium Hobro Afdeling from 2006 to 2021. He has been a member of the municipal council in Mariagerfjord Municipality since 2022, having previously been a member from 2014 to 2018.

Husted is married to Lene Kolding Abrahamsen and has two children.

Electoral history of Per Husted
Election	Constituency	Party	Votes	Result
2007 general	North Jutland	Social Democrats	2,383	Not elected
2011 general	North Jutland	Social Democrats	6,261	Not elected
2013 local	Mariagerfjord Municipality	Social Democrats	2,748	Elected
2015 general	North Jutland	Social Democrats	6,165	Not elected
2019 general	North Jutland	Social Democrats	4,266	Not elected
2021 local	Mariagerfjord Municipality	Social Democrats	559	Elected
2022 general	North Jutland	Social Democrats	2,221	Elected
2026 general	North Jutland	Social Democrats	2,846	Not elected
