= Bjarne Laustsen =

Danish politician (born 1953)

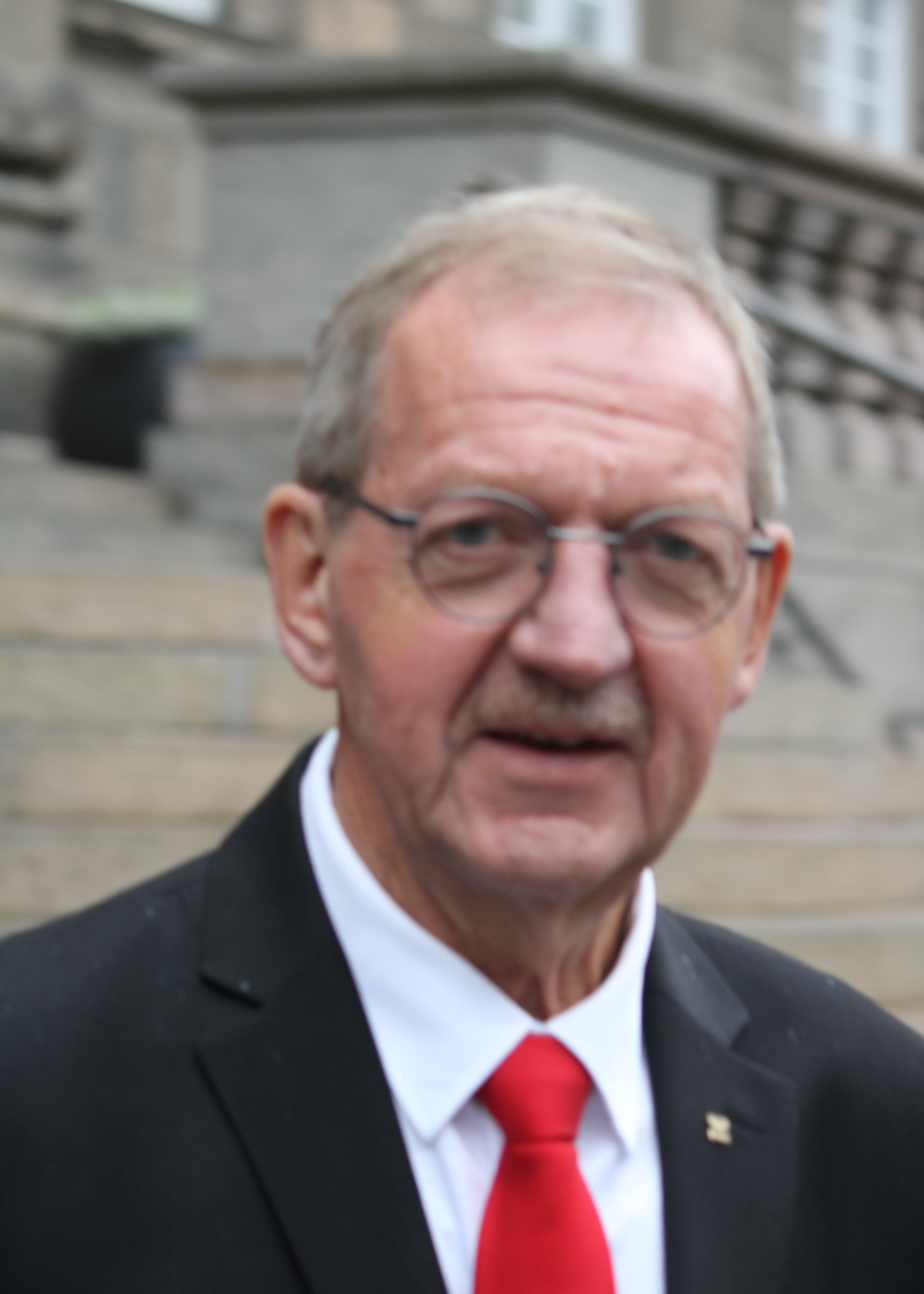
- Laustsen in 2025

Member of the Folketing
- Incumbent
- Assumed office 11 March 1998
- Constituency: North Jutland
- In office 11 November 1992 – 20 September 1994
- Constituency: North Jutland

Personal details
- Born: 9 December 1953 (age 72) Skivum, Denmark
- Party: Social Democrats

Bjarne Laustsen (born 19 December 1968) is a Danish politician, who is a member of the Folketing for the Social Democrats political party. He was elected into parliament in the 1998 Danish general election, having previously been in parliament between 1992 and 1994. He was on the municipal council of Støvring Municipality from 1986 to 1993.

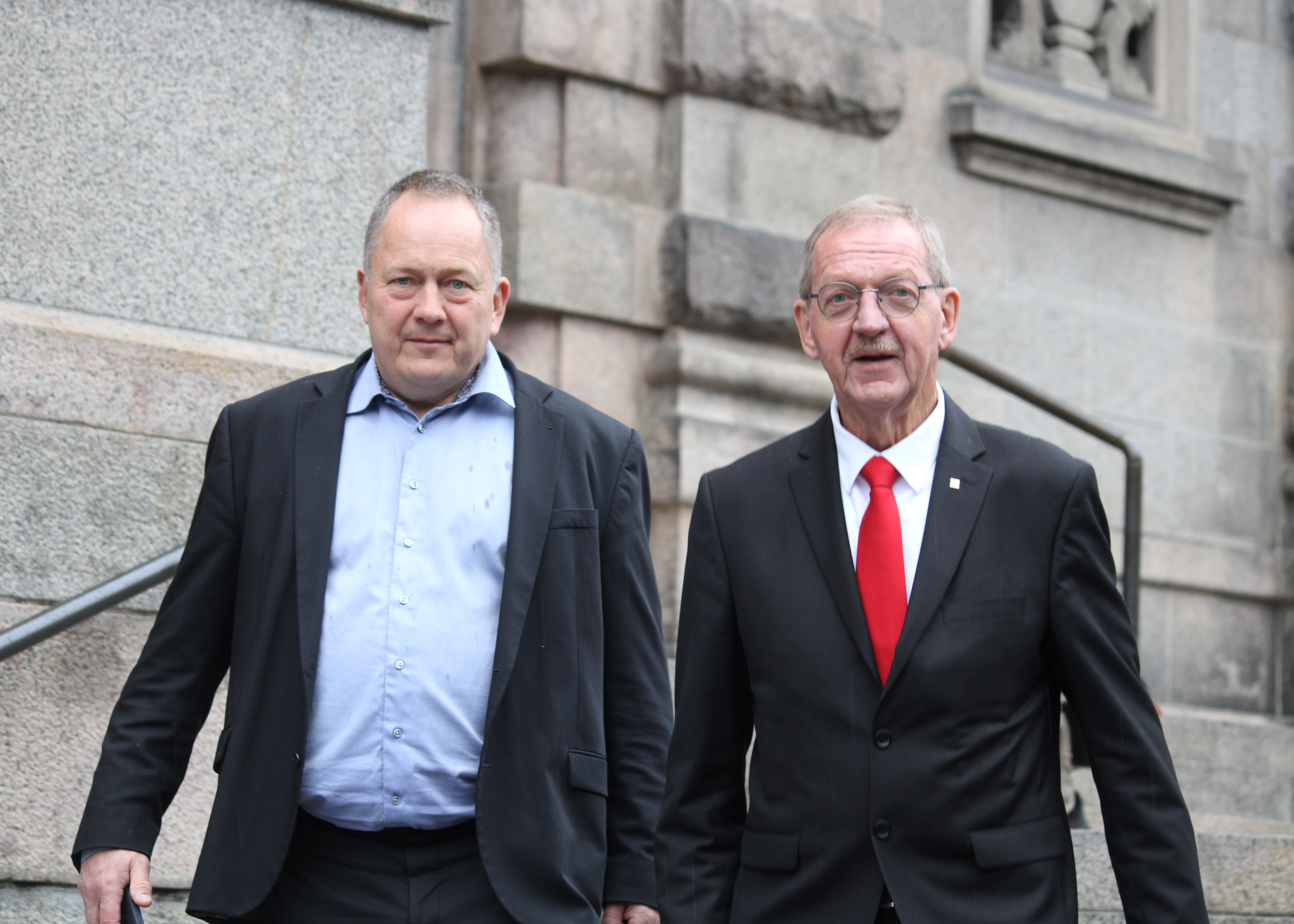
Laustsen with Henrik Møller at the 2025 opening of parliament
