= Anna Bjerre =

Danish politician (born 1998)

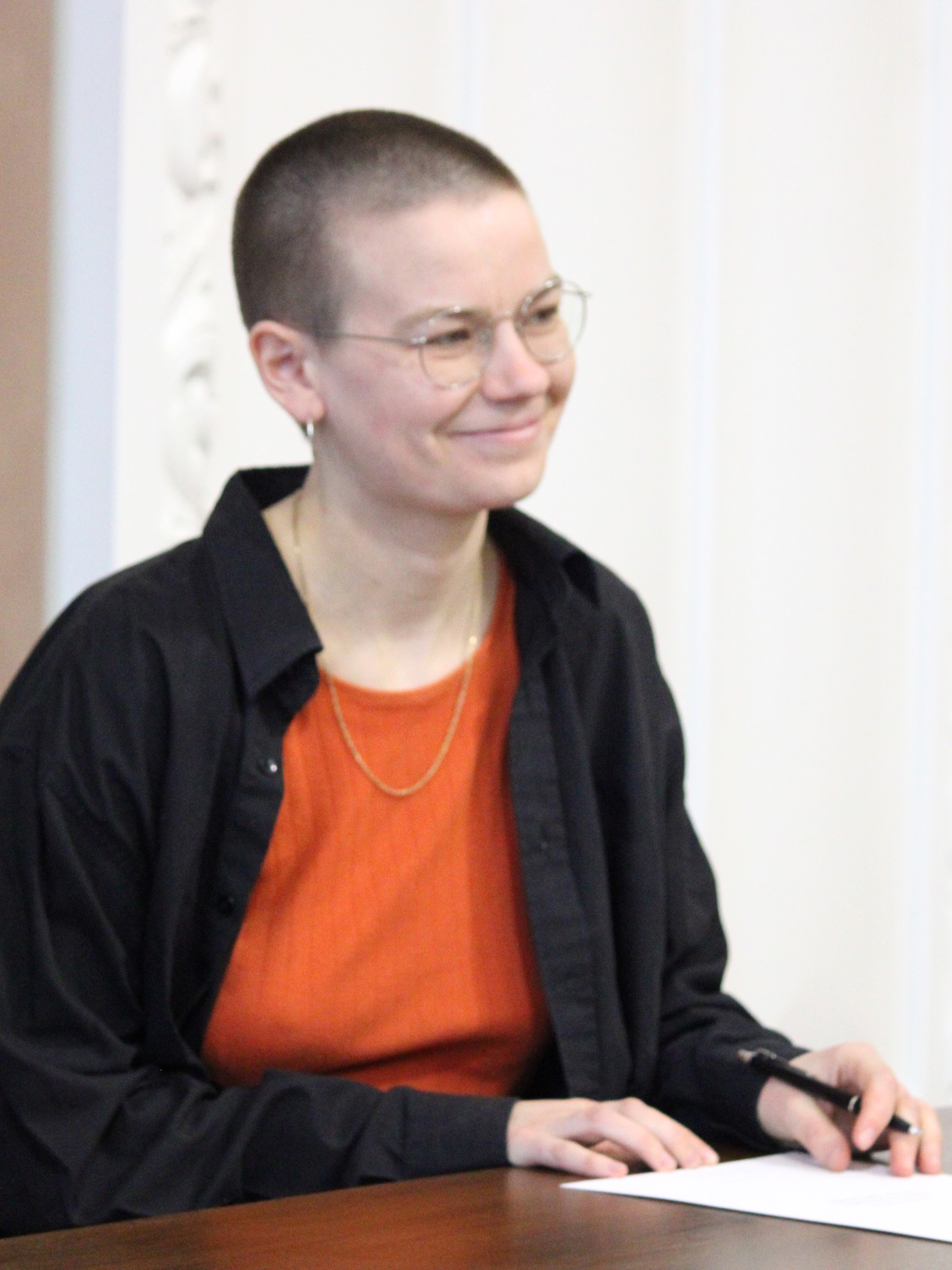

Member of the Folketing
- Incumbent
- Assumed office 24 March 2026
- Constituency: North Jutland

Personal details
- Born: 10 June 1998 (age 27)
- Party: The Alternative

Anna Bjerre Johansen (born 10 June 1998) is a Danish politician serving as a member of the Folketing since 2026. From 2023 to 2025, she worked as a rhetoric teacher at Krogerup.
