= Himmerland (nomination district) =

- Himmerland
- Nomination district constituency for the Folketing
- Location of Himmerland within North Jutland

- Location of North Jutland within Denmark
- Municipalities: Rebild; Vesthimmerland
- Constituency: North Jutland
- Electorate: 49,123 (2022)

Current constituency
- Created: 2007

Himmerland nominating district is one of the 92 nominating districts that was created for Danish elections following the 2007 municipal reform. It consists of Rebild and Vesthimmerland Municipality .

In the 2022 election, it became the nomination district in which parties commonly associated with the blue bloc of Danish politics received the highest % of votes of any located in the North Jutland folketing constituency.

== General elections results ==
=== General elections in the 2020s ===
2022 Danish general election

Parties	Vote		
Parties	Votes	%	+ / -
Social Democrats	11,968	28.98	-0.54
Denmark Democrats	7,872	19.06	New
Venstre	6,817	16.51	-15.09
Green Left	2,852	6.91	+0.54
Liberal Alliance	2,424	5.87	+4.38
Moderates	2,285	5.53	New
Conservatives	2,207	5.34	-0.08
New Right	1,708	4.14	+2.00
Social Liberals	821	1.99	-2.55
Red–Green Alliance	791	1.92	-1.08
Danish People's Party	760	1.84	-8.72
The Alternative	563	1.36	-0.11
Christian Democrats	147	0.36	-1.11
Independent Greens	51	0.12	New
Jette Møller	33	0.08	New
Total	41,299		

=== General elections in the 2010s ===
2019 Danish general election

Parties	Vote		
Parties	Votes	%	+ / -
Venstre	12,830	31.60	+5.41
Social Democrats	11,986	29.52	+3.38
Danish People's Party	4,288	10.56	-14.61
Green Left	2,588	6.37	+3.47
Conservatives	2,199	5.42	+1.97
Social Liberals	1,845	4.54	+1.63
Red–Green Alliance	1,217	3.00	-1.43
New Right	871	2.14	New
Stram Kurs	677	1.67	New
Liberal Alliance	604	1.49	-4.30
The Alternative	598	1.47	-0.77
Christian Democrats	597	1.47	+0.74
Klaus Riskær Pedersen Party	307	0.76	New
Total	40,607		

2015 Danish general election

Parties	Vote		
Parties	Votes	%	+ / -
Venstre	10,830	26.19	-5.90
Social Democrats	10,810	26.14	+1.14
Danish People's Party	10,409	25.17	+12.49
Liberal Alliance	2,396	5.79	+1.44
Red–Green Alliance	1,833	4.43	+1.36
Conservatives	1,427	3.45	-2.29
Social Liberals	1,203	2.91	-3.72
Green Left	1,198	2.90	-6.67
The Alternative	928	2.24	New
Christian Democrats	303	0.73	-0.10
Hans Schultz	14	0.03	0.00
Total	41,351		

2011 Danish general election

Parties	Vote		
Parties	Votes	%	+ / -
Venstre	13,516	32.09	+2.48
Social Democrats	10,528	25.00	+1.77
Danish People's Party	5,342	12.68	-0.67
Green Left	4,032	9.57	+0.07
Social Liberals	2,793	6.63	+3.00
Conservatives	2,419	5.74	-10.99
Liberal Alliance	1,833	4.35	+2.37
Red–Green Alliance	1,292	3.07	+2.20
Christian Democrats	349	0.83	-0.25
Hans Schultz	13	0.03	+0.02
Total	42,117		

=== General elections in the 2000s ===
2007 Danish general election

Parties	Vote		
Parties	Votes	%	+ / -
Venstre	12,350	29.61	
Social Democrats	9,690	23.23	
Conservatives	6,979	16.73	
Danish People's Party	5,567	13.35	
Green Left	3,961	9.50	
Social Liberals	1,513	3.63	
New Alliance	826	1.98	
Christian Democrats	449	1.08	
Red–Green Alliance	363	0.87	
Anders Gravers Pedersen	7	0.02	
Hans Schultz	3	0.01	
Total	41,708		

== European Parliament elections results ==
2024 European Parliament election in Denmark

Parties	Vote		
Parties	Votes	%	+ / -
Venstre	6,267	23.48	-15.78
Denmark Democrats	4,975	18.64	New
Social Democrats	3,887	14.56	-6.85
Green Left	3,051	11.43	+2.86
Conservatives	1,885	7.06	+2.77
Danish People's Party	1,602	6.00	-5.07
Liberal Alliance	1,513	5.67	+4.13
Social Liberals	1,167	4.37	-1.63
Moderates	1,080	4.05	New
Red–Green Alliance	884	3.31	+0.46
The Alternative	379	1.42	-0.23
Total	26,690		

2019 European Parliament election in Denmark

Parties	Vote		
Parties	Votes	%	+ / -
Venstre	12,092	39.26	+16.98
Social Democrats	6,594	21.41	+4.58
Danish People's Party	3,410	11.07	-18.46
Green Left	2,639	8.57	+0.89
Social Liberals	1,849	6.00	+1.67
Conservatives	1,322	4.29	-5.80
People's Movement against the EU	1,036	3.36	-3.40
Red–Green Alliance	879	2.85	New
The Alternative	509	1.65	New
Liberal Alliance	473	1.54	-0.95
Total	30,803		

2014 European Parliament election in Denmark

Parties	Vote		
Parties	Votes	%	+ / -
Danish People's Party	7,290	29.53	+15.46
Venstre	5,501	22.28	-6.08
Social Democrats	4,155	16.83	-1.70
Conservatives	2,492	10.09	-4.56
Green Left	1,897	7.68	-4.84
People's Movement against the EU	1,668	6.76	+2.12
Social Liberals	1,069	4.33	+1.41
Liberal Alliance	614	2.49	+2.08
Total	24,686		

2009 European Parliament election in Denmark

Parties	Vote		
Parties	Votes	%	+ / -
Venstre	7,648	28.36	
Social Democrats	4,998	18.53	
Conservatives	3,950	14.65	
Danish People's Party	3,794	14.07	
Green Left	3,376	12.52	
People's Movement against the EU	1,251	4.64	
June Movement	1,054	3.91	
Social Liberals	787	2.92	
Liberal Alliance	110	0.41	
Total	26,968		

== Referendums ==
2022 Danish European Union opt-out referendum

Option	Votes	%
✓ YES	20,651	65.22
X NO	11,014	34.78

2015 Danish European Union opt-out referendum

Option	Votes	%
X NO	18,608	54.53
✓ YES	15,517	45.47

2014 Danish Unified Patent Court membership referendum

Option	Votes	%
✓ YES	15,427	64.26
X NO	8,580	35.74

2009 Danish Act of Succession referendum

Option	Votes	%
✓ YES	22,636	86.65
X NO	3,488	13.35
