= Preben Bang Henriksen =

Danish lawyer, author and politician

Member of the Folketing
- Incumbent
- Assumed office 15 September 2011
- Constituency: North Jutland

Personal details
- Born: 11 February 1954 (age 72) Nørresundby, Denmark
- Party: Independent (Since 2026)
- Other political affiliations: Venstre (Until 2026)
- Education: Aarhus University

Preben Bang Henriksen (born 11 February 1954) is a Danish lawyer, author and politician, who is a member of the Folketing, formerly for the Venstre political party. He was elected into parliament at the 2011 Danish general election.

== Background ==
He graduated as master of law from Aarhus University in 1979, became a solicitor in 1982, gained the right to appear before the High Court from 1982 and right to appear before the Supreme Court from 1986.

== Bibliography ==
- Erhvervslejeretten i hovedtræk (1990)
- Erhvervslejeretten (1990)
- Skolens lejemål (1990)
- Erhvervslejemål - rettigheder og pligter efter den ny erhvervslejelov (2008)
