= Mariagerfjord (nomination district) =

- Mariagerfjord
- Nomination district constituency for the Folketing
- Location of Mariagerfjord within North Jutland

- Location of North Jutland within Denmark
- Municipalities: Mariagerfjord
- Constituency: North Jutland
- Electorate: 31,658 (2022)

Current constituency
- Created: 2007

Mariagerfjord nominating district is one of the 92 nominating districts that was created for Danish elections following the 2007 municipal reform. It consists of Mariagerfjord municipality.

Parties of the commonly nicknamed blue bloc has received more votes than the red bloc in all the general elections, but the Social Democrats has won the most votes since the 2011 election.

== General elections results ==
=== General elections in the 2020s ===
2022 Danish general election

Parties	Vote		
Parties	Votes	%	+ / -
Social Democrats	8,626	33.00	-0.94
Denmark Democrats	6,089	23.30	New
Venstre	3,047	11.66	-16.13
Liberal Alliance	1,505	5.76	+3.85
Moderates	1,368	5.23	New
Conservatives	1,317	5.04	-0.30
Green Left	1,272	4.87	+0.35
New Right	919	3.52	+1.66
Red–Green Alliance	594	2.27	-1.47
Danish People's Party	474	1.81	-8.95
Social Liberals	401	1.53	-3.37
The Alternative	385	1.47	+0.02
Christian Democrats	92	0.35	-1.07
Jette Møller	27	0.10	New
Independent Greens	20	0.08	New
Total	26,136		

=== General elections in the 2010s ===
2019 Danish general election

Parties	Vote		
Parties	Votes	%	+ / -
Social Democrats	8,795	33.94	+4.57
Venstre	7,202	27.79	+4.46
Danish People's Party	2,787	10.76	-13.77
Conservatives	1,384	5.34	+3.11
Social Liberals	1,270	4.90	+2.02
Green Left	1,170	4.52	+1.47
Red–Green Alliance	968	3.74	-1.66
Liberal Alliance	494	1.91	-3.79
New Right	483	1.86	New
Stram Kurs	407	1.57	New
The Alternative	376	1.45	-1.25
Christian Democrats	369	1.42	+0.68
Klaus Riskær Pedersen Party	207	0.80	New
Total	25,912		

2015 Danish general election

Parties	Vote		
Parties	Votes	%	+ / -
Social Democrats	7,757	29.37	-1.10
Danish People's Party	6,479	24.53	+11.49
Venstre	6,160	23.33	-5.76
Liberal Alliance	1,504	5.70	+1.30
Red–Green Alliance	1,427	5.40	+1.77
Green Left	805	3.05	-4.22
Social Liberals	761	2.88	-3.47
The Alternative	714	2.70	New
Conservatives	589	2.23	-2.63
Christian Democrats	195	0.74	-0.12
Hans Schultz	17	0.06	+0.03
Total	26,408		

2011 Danish general election

Parties	Vote		
Parties	Votes	%	+ / -
Social Democrats	8,227	30.47	+2.63
Venstre	7,856	29.09	+0.63
Danish People's Party	3,522	13.04	-1.10
Green Left	1,964	7.27	-2.18
Social Liberals	1,715	6.35	+2.72
Conservatives	1,311	4.86	-7.90
Liberal Alliance	1,189	4.40	+2.48
Red–Green Alliance	979	3.63	+2.80
Christian Democrats	233	0.86	-0.09
Hans Schultz	7	0.03	+0.02
Total	27,003		

=== General elections in the 2000s ===
2007 Danish general election

Parties	Vote		
Parties	Votes	%	+ / -
Venstre	7,647	28.46	
Social Democrats	7,478	27.84	
Danish People's Party	3,798	14.14	
Conservatives	3,429	12.76	
Green Left	2,540	9.45	
Social Liberals	974	3.63	
New Alliance	516	1.92	
Christian Democrats	254	0.95	
Red–Green Alliance	222	0.83	
Anders Gravers Pedersen	5	0.02	
Hans Schultz	2	0.01	
Total	26,865		

== European Parliament elections results ==
2024 European Parliament election in Denmark

Parties	Vote		
Parties	Votes	%	+ / -
Denmark Democrats	3,675	22.03	New
Social Democrats	3,002	18.00	-6.94
Venstre	2,749	16.48	-18.22
Green Left	1,903	11.41	+3.10
Conservatives	1,085	6.5	+2.89
Danish People's Party	1,077	6.46	-5.29
Liberal Alliance	896	5.37	+3.23
Moderates	796	4.77	New
Social Liberals	637	3.82	-1.91
Red–Green Alliance	586	3.51	+0.17
The Alternative	276	1.65	-0.22
Total	16,682		

2019 European Parliament election in Denmark

Parties	Vote		
Parties	Votes	%	+ / -
Venstre	6,761	34.70	+14.38
Social Democrats	4,860	24.94	+4.11
Danish People's Party	2,289	11.75	-18.17
Green Left	1,620	8.31	+0.74
Social Liberals	1,116	5.73	+2.05
Conservatives	704	3.61	-4.63
People's Movement against the EU	703	3.61	-3.42
Red–Green Alliance	651	3.34	New
Liberal Alliance	417	2.14	-0.26
The Alternative	364	1.87	New
Total	19,485		

2014 European Parliament election in Denmark

Parties	Vote		
Parties	Votes	%	+ / -
Danish People's Party	4,668	29.92	+15.02
Social Democrats	3,250	20.83	-1.21
Venstre	3,170	20.32	-3.70
Conservatives	1,286	8.24	-6.29
Green Left	1,181	7.57	-5.65
People's Movement against the EU	1,096	7.03	+1.60
Social Liberals	574	3.68	+0.93
Liberal Alliance	375	2.40	+1.94
Total	15,600		

2009 European Parliament election in Denmark

Parties	Vote		
Parties	Votes	%	+ / -
Venstre	4,144	24.02	
Social Democrats	3,803	22.04	
Danish People's Party	2,571	14.90	
Conservatives	2,507	14.53	
Green Left	2,280	13.22	
People's Movement against the EU	936	5.43	
Social Liberals	474	2.75	
June Movement	459	2.66	
Liberal Alliance	79	0.46	
Total	17,253		

== Referendums ==
2022 Danish European Union opt-out referendum

Option	Votes	%
✓ YES	12,339	61.95
X NO	7,579	38.05

2015 Danish European Union opt-out referendum

Option	Votes	%
X NO	12,687	57.28
✓ YES	9,464	42.72

2014 Danish Unified Patent Court membership referendum

Option	Votes	%
✓ YES	9,479	62.14
X NO	5,775	37.86

2009 Danish Act of Succession referendum

Option	Votes	%
✓ YES	14,334	86.06
X NO	2,322	13.94
