= Brønderslev (nomination district) =

- Brønderslev
- Nomination district constituency for the Folketing
- Location of Brønderslev within North Jutland

- Location of North Jutland within Denmark
- Municipalities: Brønderslev; Jammerbugt
- Constituency: North Jutland
- Electorate: 56,046 (2022)

Current constituency
- Created: 2007

Brønderslev nominating district is one of the 92 nominating districts that was created for Danish elections following the 2007 municipal reform. It consists of Brønderslev and Jammerbugt Municipality.

Parties of the commonly nicknamed blue bloc has received more votes than the red bloc in all the general elections, although the Social Democrats has won the most votes in the district in all general elections.

== General elections results ==
=== General elections in the 2020s ===
2022 Danish general election

Parties	Vote		
Parties	Votes	%	+ / -
Social Democrats	16,803	35.80	+0.63
Denmark Democrats	8,410	17.92	New
Venstre	6,994	14.90	-13.70
Liberal Alliance	2,843	6.06	+4.36
Moderates	2,689	5.73	New
Green Left	2,094	4.46	+0.06
New Right	1,985	4.23	+1.82
Conservatives	1,741	3.71	-0.75
Danish People's Party	1,054	2.25	-8.87
Red–Green Alliance	786	1.67	-1.29
Social Liberals	630	1.34	-2.25
The Alternative	581	1.24	-0.19
Christian Democrats	246	0.52	-1.07
Independent Greens	41	0.09	New
Jette Møller	40	0.09	New
Total	46,937		

=== General elections in the 2010s ===
2019 Danish general election

Parties	Vote		
Parties	Votes	%	+ / -
Social Democrats	16,301	35.17	+4.84
Venstre	13,255	28.60	+3.71
Danish People's Party	5,153	11.12	-12.69
Conservatives	2,067	4.46	+2.01
Green Left	2,038	4.40	+1.20
Social Liberals	1,665	3.59	+1.38
Red–Green Alliance	1,370	2.96	-1.99
New Right	1,117	2.41	New
Stram Kurs	799	1.72	New
Liberal Alliance	786	1.70	-3.34
Christian Democrats	738	1.59	+0.70
The Alternative	665	1.43	-0.78
Klaus Riskær Pedersen Party	400	0.86	New
Total	46,354		

2015 Danish general election

Parties	Vote		
Parties	Votes	%	+ / -
Social Democrats	14,351	30.33	-1.16
Venstre	11,776	24.89	-3.44
Danish People's Party	11,269	23.81	+11.30
Liberal Alliance	2,385	5.04	+1.24
Red–Green Alliance	2,342	4.95	+1.52
Green Left	1,513	3.20	-4.94
Conservatives	1,159	2.45	-3.00
The Alternative	1,048	2.21	New
Social Liberals	1,044	2.21	-3.70
Christian Democrats	423	0.89	-0.02
Hans Schultz	11	0.02	-0.02
Total	47,321		

2011 Danish general election

Parties	Vote		
Parties	Votes	%	+ / -
Social Democrats	15,237	31.49	+1.72
Venstre	13,707	28.33	+0.32
Danish People's Party	6,051	12.51	-1.64
Green Left	3,938	8.14	-0.86
Social Liberals	2,861	5.91	+2.87
Conservatives	2,635	5.45	-7.01
Liberal Alliance	1,838	3.80	+2.26
Red–Green Alliance	1,658	3.43	+2.71
Christian Democrats	440	0.91	-0.40
Hans Schultz	19	0.04	+0.04
Total	48,384		

=== General elections in the 2000s ===
2007 Danish general election

Parties	Vote		
Parties	Votes	%	+ / -
Social Democrats	14,134	29.77	
Venstre	13,298	28.01	
Danish People's Party	6,718	14.15	
Conservatives	5,914	12.46	
Green Left	4,273	9.00	
Social Liberals	1,443	3.04	
New Alliance	729	1.54	
Christian Democrats	623	1.31	
Red–Green Alliance	340	0.72	
Anders Gravers Pedersen	6	0.01	
Hans Schultz	2	0.00	
Total	47,480		

== European Parliament elections results ==
2024 European Parliament election in Denmark

Parties	Vote		
Parties	Votes	%	+ / -
Social Democrats	5,628	19.69	-9.04
Denmark Democrats	5,500	19.24	New
Venstre	5,361	18.76	-17.48
Green Left	3,048	10.66	+3.80
Danish People's Party	1,903	6.66	-4.19
Liberal Alliance	1,748	6.12	+4.78
Conservatives	1,673	5.85	+2.73
Moderates	1,338	4.68	New
Social Liberals	1,024	3.58	-0.91
Red–Green Alliance	1,005	3.52	+0.88
The Alternative	356	1.25	-0.25
Total	28,584		

2019 European Parliament election in Denmark

Parties	Vote		
Parties	Votes	%	+ / -
Venstre	12,680	36.24	+16.21
Social Democrats	10,052	28.73	+3.10
Danish People's Party	3,797	10.85	-17.50
Green Left	2,399	6.86	+1.22
Social Liberals	1,571	4.49	+1.69
People's Movement against the EU	1,478	4.22	-3.43
Conservatives	1,091	3.12	-3.94
Red–Green Alliance	923	2.64	New
The Alternative	526	1.50	New
Liberal Alliance	468	1.34	-1.51
Total	34,985		

2014 European Parliament election in Denmark

Parties	Vote		
Parties	Votes	%	+ / -
Danish People's Party	7,996	28.35	+14.95
Social Democrats	7,228	25.63	-0.69
Venstre	5,649	20.03	-4.13
People's Movement against the EU	2,157	7.65	+1.15
Conservatives	1,992	7.06	-5.59
Green Left	1,590	5.64	-5.80
Liberal Alliance	804	2.85	+2.45
Social Liberals	789	2.80	+0.28
Total	28,205		

2009 European Parliament election in Denmark

Parties	Vote		
Parties	Votes	%	+ / -
Social Democrats	7,685	26.32	
Venstre	7,053	24.16	
Danish People's Party	3,913	13.40	
Conservatives	3,694	12.65	
Green Left	3,341	11.44	
People's Movement against the EU	1,899	6.50	
June Movement	757	2.59	
Social Liberals	736	2.52	
Liberal Alliance	117	0.40	
Total	29,195		

== Referendums ==
2022 Danish European Union opt-out referendum

Option	Votes	%
✓ YES	22,239	62.31
X NO	13,450	37.69

2015 Danish European Union opt-out referendum

Option	Votes	%
X NO	23,022	58.51
✓ YES	16,328	41.49

2014 Danish Unified Patent Court membership referendum

Option	Votes	%
✓ YES	16,848	61.43
X NO	10,580	38.57

2009 Danish Act of Succession referendum

Option	Votes	%
✓ YES	24,123	85.68
X NO	4,032	14.32
