= Lise Bech =

Danish politician

Member of the Folketing
- Incumbent
- Assumed office 18 June 2015
- Constituency: North Jutland

Personal details
- Born: 16 September 1961 (age 64) Esbjerg, Denmark
- Party: Denmark Democrats (2022-)
- Other political affiliations: Danish People's Party (until 2022)

Lise Bech (born 16 September 1961) is a Danish politician, who is a member of the Folketing for the Danish People's Party. She was elected into the Folketing in the 2015 Danish general election.

== Political career ==
Bech was in the municipal council of Støvring Municipality from 1999 to 2006. She was later in the municipal council of Rebild Municipality from 2014 to 2015.

Bech first ran in the 2015 election, where she was elected after receiving 4,181 personal votes. She was reelected in the 2019 election with 2,306 votes, though this time her seat was a levelling seat. Since 2022, she has been a member of the Denmark Democrats party.
