= Peder Hvelplund =

Danish politician (born 1967)

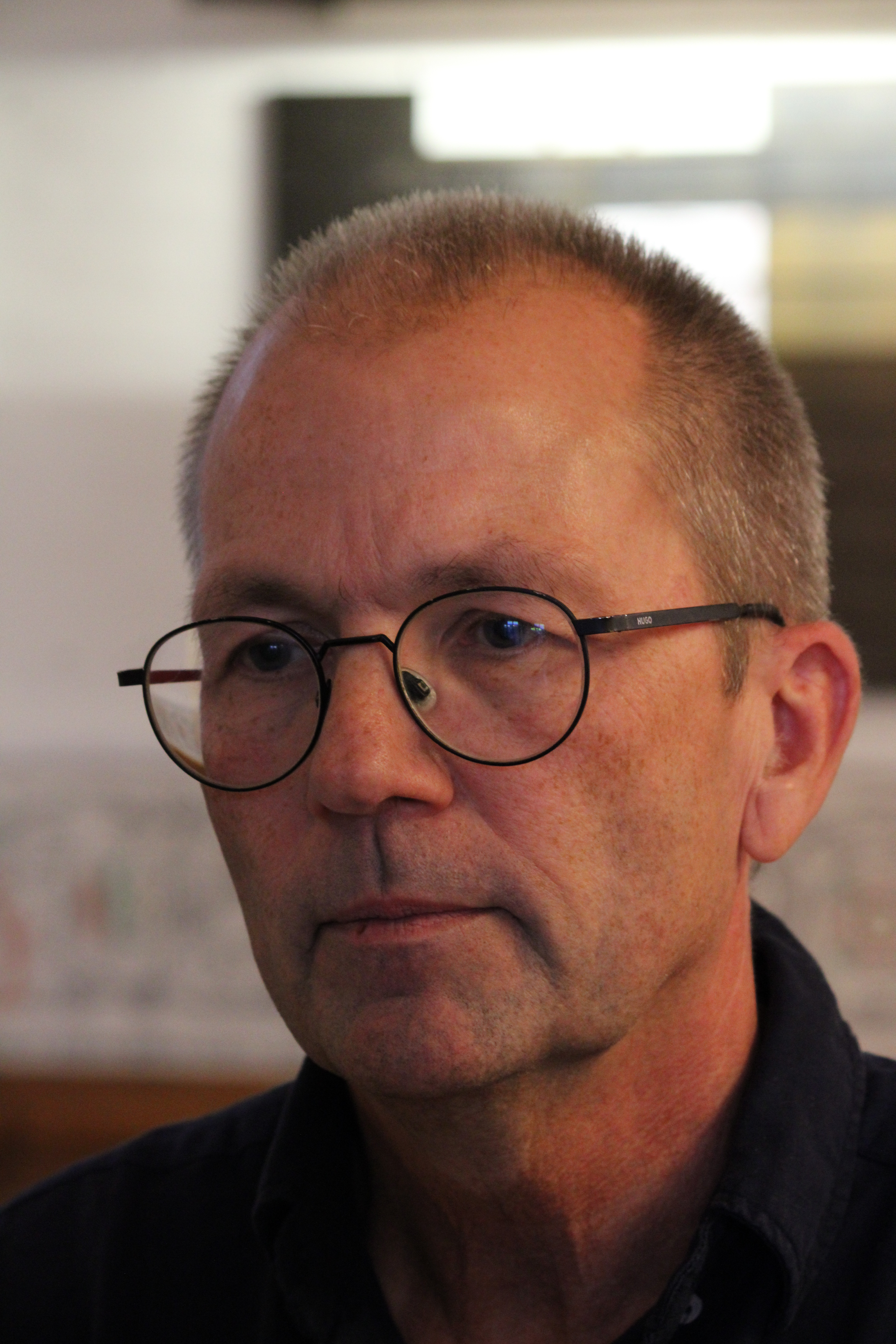
- Hvelplund in 2025

Member of the Folketing
- Incumbent
- Assumed office 5 June 2019
- Constituency: North Jutland

Personal details
- Born: 8 September 1967 (age 58) Ringkøbing, Denmark
- Party: Red-Green Alliance

Peder Hvelplund (born 8 September 1967) is a Danish politician, who is a member of the Folketing for the Red-Green Alliance political party. He was elected into parliament at the 2019 Danish general election.

== Political career ==
Hvelplund ran in the 2015 Danish general election but was not elected, receiving 423 votes. While not elected, this made him the Red-Green Alliance's primary substitute for the North Jutland constituency. Stine Brix was elected for the party in the constituency, and Hvelplund acted as substitute for her on two occasions: from 22 December 2018 to 7 May 2019 and from 29 March 2016 to 28 February 2017.

Hvelplund was elected into parliament at the 2019 election, where he received 1,028 votes. During the COVID-19 pandemic the Red-Green Alliance made Hvelplund the spokesman of Corona-related issues.
