= Kristian Klarskov =

Danish politician

Member of the Folketing
- In office 1 November 2022 – 23 November 2022
- Constituency: North Jutland

Personal details
- Born: 30 October 1975 (age 50) Skagen
- Children: 1

Military service
- Years of service: 1995
- Unit: Prince's Life Regiment

Kristian Klarskov (born 30 October 1975) is a Danish politician and entrepreneur who was a Member of the Folketing for the Moderates from 1 November 2022 to 23 November 2022.

== Career ==
Klarskov was elected to the Folketing at the 2022 Danish general election having received 1,772 personal votes.

On 23 November 2022, a week after he was officially sworn in, Klarskov resigned his position as Member of the Folketing. Among other things, Klarskov was accused of faking credentials on his resume and living a fake life of luxury, supposedly funded by several successful startups he had led, in an article published by Jyllands-Posten. One of the companies he had been director of, Wakk Ultrawear, has not had any activity since 2018. Klarskov was replaced by Mohammad Rona.

== Personal life ==
Klarskov is married and has one child.
