= Flemming Møller Mortensen =

Danish politician

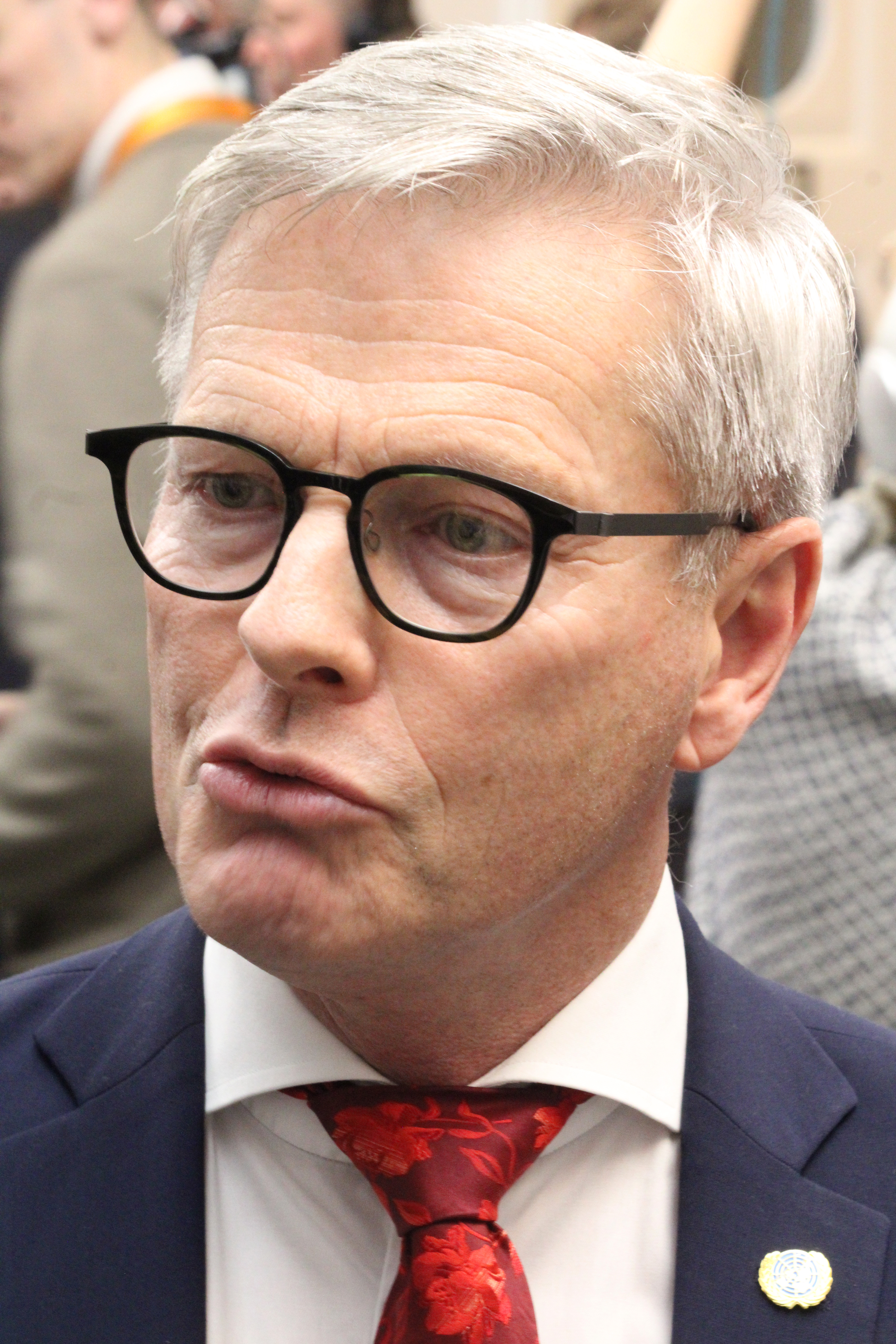
- Møller Mortensen in 2026

Minister for Development and Nordic Cooperation
- In office 19 November 2020 – 15 December 2022
- Prime Minister: Mette Frederiksen
- Preceded by: Rasmus Prehn (Development); Mogens Jensen (Nordic Cooperation)
- Succeeded by: Dan Jørgensen (Development); Louise Schack Elholm (Nordic Cooperation)

Member of the Folketing
- Incumbent
- Assumed office 13 November 2007
- Constituency: North Jutland

Personal details
- Born: 3 July 1963 (age 62) Store Brøndum, Denmark
- Party: Social Democrats

Flemming Møller Mortensen (born 3 July 1963) is a Danish politician of the Social Democrats who has been serving as a member of the Folketing since the 2007 elections. He served as the Minister for Development and Nordic Cooperation in the government of Prime Minister Mette Frederiksen between 2020 and 2022.

== Political career ==
Mortensen sat in the municipal council of Skørping Municipality from 2001 to 2007, and then sat in the newly formed Rebild Municipality's municipal council in 2007. In 2007 he was also elected into parliament.

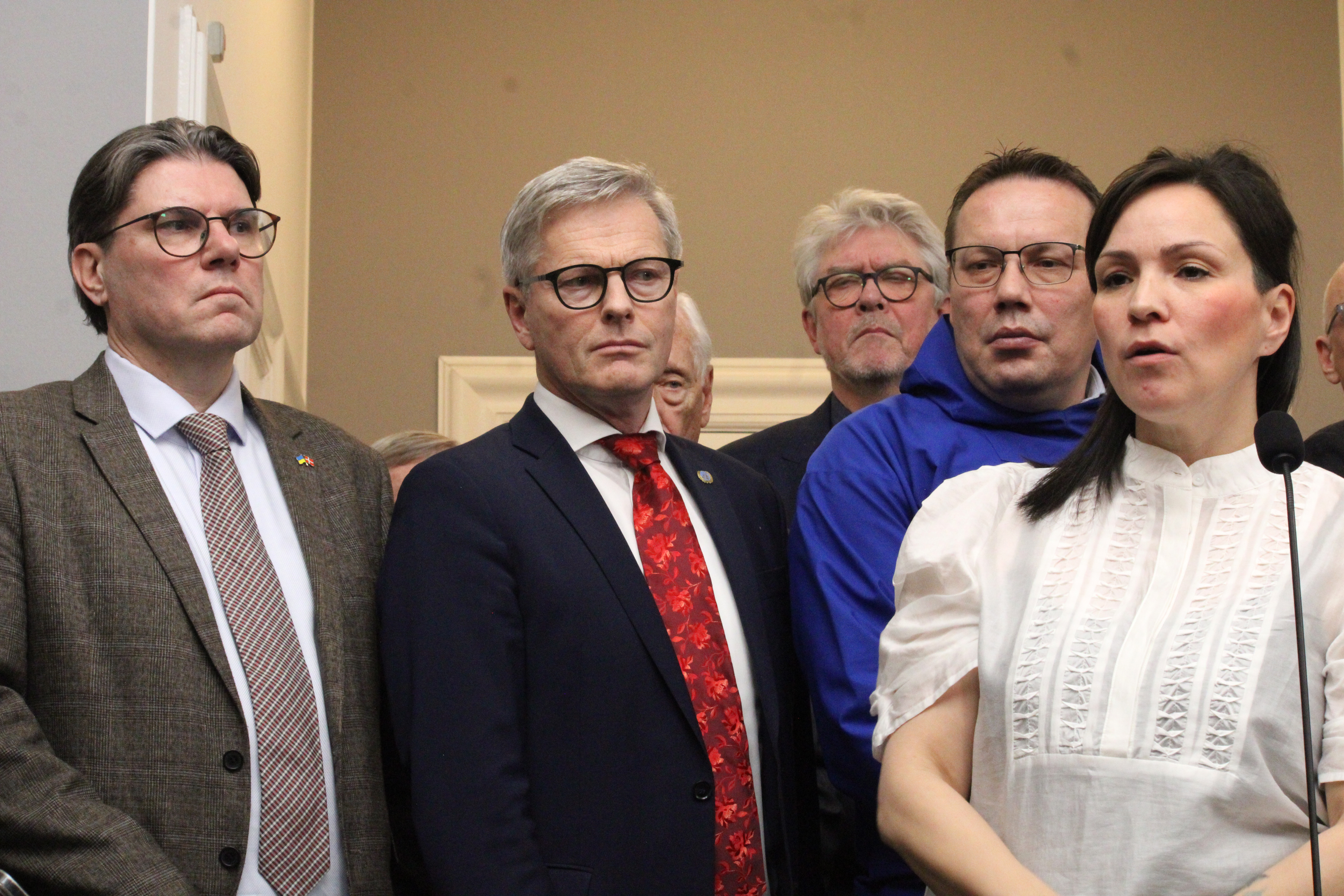
Møller Mortensen at a press conference about the Greenland crisis, 16 January 2026

On 19 November 2020, Mortensen was appointed Minister of Development and Nordic Cooperation. Following the 2022 election, he was replaced by Dan Jørgensen as minister for cooperation and Louise Schack Elholm as minister of Nordic cooperation.

== Other activities ==
- Joint World Bank-IMF Development Committee, Member (since 2022)
- World Bank, Ex-Officio Member of the Board of Governors (since 2020)

Political offices
Preceded by Rasmus Prehn	Minister for Development Cooperation; 2020–2022	Succeeded by Dan Jørgensen
Preceded by Mogens Jensen	Minister for Nordic Cooperation; 2020–2022	Succeeded by Louise Schack Elholm
