= Simon Kollerup =

Danish politician

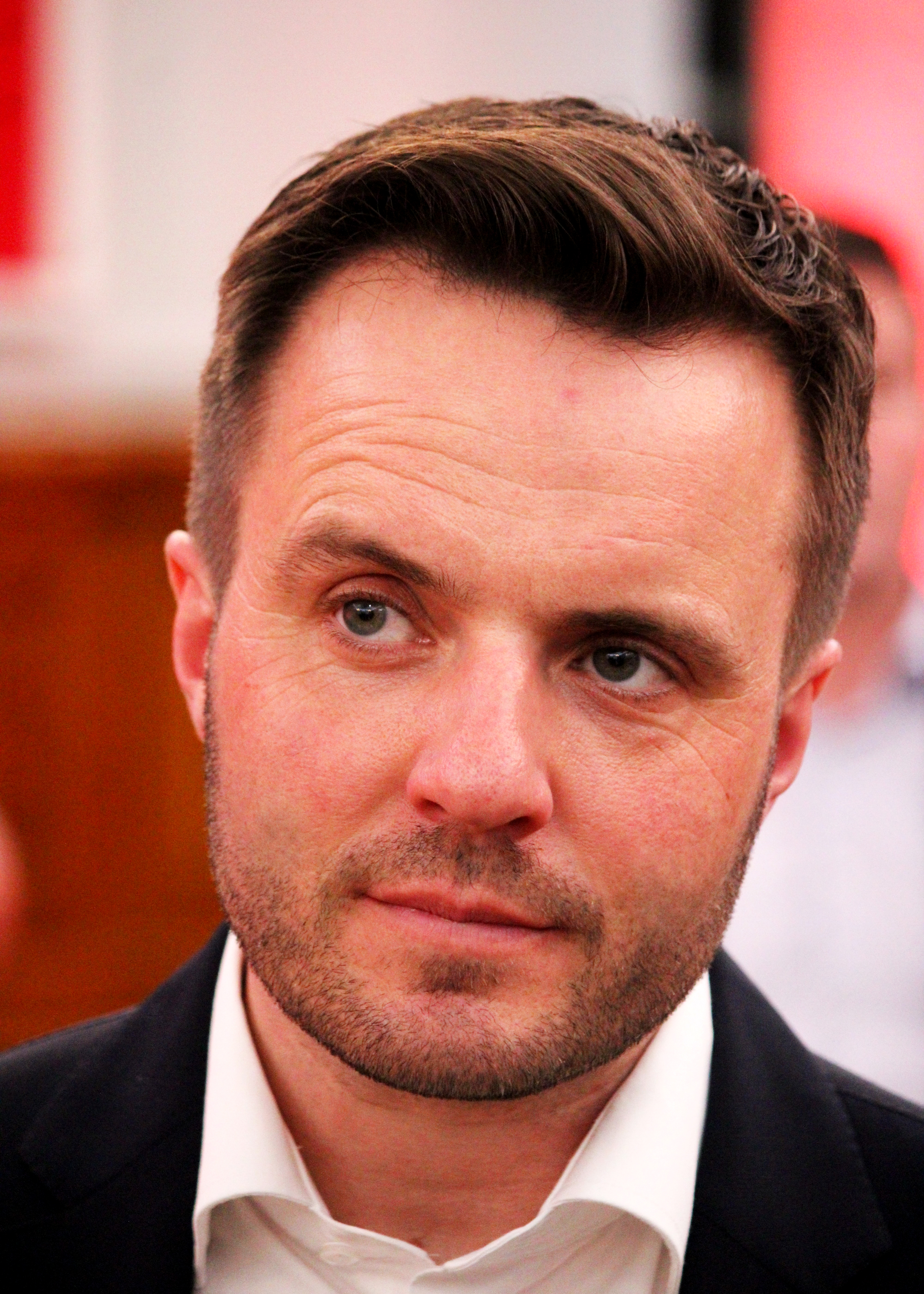
- Kollerup in 2026

Minister of Business Affairs
- In office 27 June 2019 – 15 December 2022
- Prime Minister: Mette Frederiksen
- Preceded by: Rasmus Jarlov
- Succeeded by: Morten Bødskov

Member of the Folketing
- Incumbent
- Assumed office 15 September 2011
- Constituency: North Jutland

Personal details
- Born: 20 May 1986 (age 40) Thisted, Denmark
- Party: Social Democrats (Denmark)

Simon Kollerup (born 20 May 1986) is a Danish politician, who is a member of the Folketing for the Social Democrats political party. He has been serving as Minister of Economic and Business Affairs in the Frederiksen Cabinet from 2019 to 2022.

== Political career ==
Kollerup has been a member of Folketinget since the 2011 elections. He was appointed Minister of Economic and Business Affairs in the cabinet of Prime Minister Mette Frederiksen from 27 June 2019.

In 2020, Kollerup publicly criticized a decision by Danske Bank’s mortgage provider to double the downpayment required for home buyers amid the COVID-19 pandemic in Denmark.

=== Other activities ===
- European Investment Bank (EIB), Ex-Officio Member of the Board of Governors (since 2019)
- European Bank for Reconstruction and Development (EBRD), Ex-Officio Member of the Board of Governors (since 2019)
- Nordic Investment Bank (NIB), Ex-Officio Member of the Board of Governors (since 2019)

Political offices
Preceded by Rasmus Jarlov	Minister of Business Affairs; 2019–	Succeeded by Incumbent
