= Bent Bøgsted =

Danish politician

Member of the Folketing
- Incumbent
- Assumed office 20 November 2001
- Constituency: North Jutland

Personal details
- Born: 4 January 1956 (age 70) Serritslev, Denmark
- Party: Danish People's Party (until 2022)

Bent Gunnar Bøgsted (born 4 January 1956) is a Danish politician, who is a member of the Folketing for the Danish People's Party. He was elected into parliament at the 2001 Danish general election.

== Background ==
Bøgsted graduated from Aalborg Technical School. Before being elected into parliament, Bøgsted has worked as an operator, gunsmith, farmer and shipyard worker.

== Political career ==
Bøgsted first ran for parliament in the 2001 Danish general election, where he was elected into parliament with 4,608 votes cast for him. He was reelected in the 2005, 2007, 2011, 2015 and 2019 elections.
