= Rasmus Prehn =

Danish politician (born 1973)

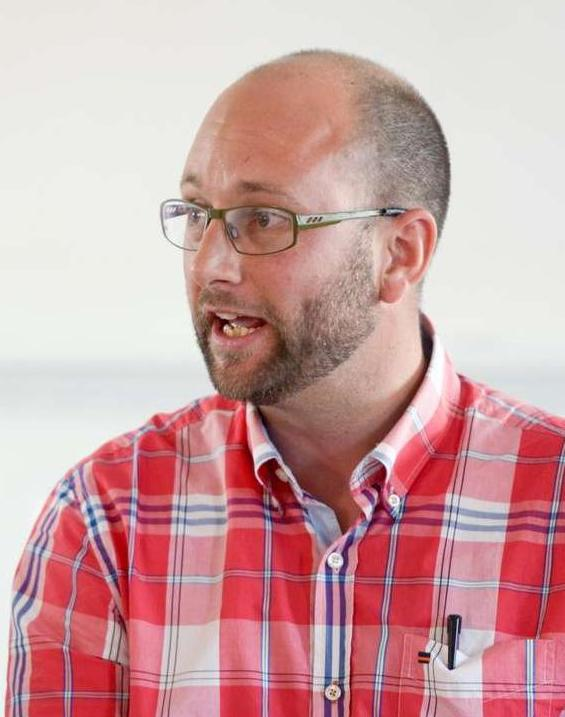
- Prehn at Folkemødet in 2012

Minister for Food, Agriculture and Fisheries
- In office 19 November 2020 – 15 December 2022
- Prime Minister: Mette Frederiksen
- Preceded by: Mogens Jensen
- Succeeded by: Jacob Jensen

Minister for Development Cooperation
- In office 27 June 2019 – 19 November 2020
- Prime Minister: Mette Frederiksen
- Preceded by: Ulla Tørnæs
- Succeeded by: Flemming Møller Mortensen

Member of the Folketing
- In office 8 February 2005 – 27 February 2025
- Succeeded by: Morten Klessen
- Constituency: North Jutland

Personal details
- Born: 18 June 1973 (age 53) Høje-Taastrup, Denmark
- Party: Social Democrats
- Children: 3
- Education: Aalborg University, University of Leeds

Rasmus Prehn (born 18 June 1973) is a Danish politician who has been a member of the Folketing since the 2005 Danish general election. He served as Minister for Development Cooperation from 2019 to 2020, and as Minister for Food, Agriculture and Fisheries from 2020 to 2022.

== Background ==
Prehn was born in Høje-Taastrup to Flemming Prehn and Birte Hanne Prehn, and is married to Heidi Linnemann Prehn. He studied at Aalborg University and the University of Leeds, graduating with a Master's degree in social science.

== Political career ==
Prehn has been a member of Folketinget for the Social Democrats since the 2005 national elections. During his time in parliament, he served as chairman of the Committee on Research, Education and Further Education.

Prehn was appointed Minister for Development Cooperation in the Frederiksen Cabinet on 27 June 2019. In this capacity, he pledged a total of US$51 million in contributions of Denmark to Global Fund to Fight AIDS, Tuberculosis and Malaria for the 2020-2022 period.

In 2022 it was revealed that Prehn had essentially committed embezzlement, by using his ministerial credit card, to pay for a dinner in 2020. When asked, he lied about it, and stated that the dinner had been with journalist Søren Wormslevs. Wormslevs denied ever having dined with Prehn, and Prehn later confirmed he had never dined with Wormslevs. As a result of the scandal, the state accountants decided that all ministers use of their ministerial credit cards from 2015 and onward was to be investigated. Prehn said it saddened him that he had contributed to the investigation being launched. He was however never convicted of a crime, due to the immunity politicians have in regards to indictments.

Also in 2022, Prehn was re-elected as Member of the Folketing, though with only a third of the votes he got in 2019. He was subsequently replaced as Minister for Development Cooperation by Jacob Jensen.

In February 2025, he announced he would resign from his Folketing seat to become the director of the Organic Association. The organization is heavily supported with 30-40 mill DKK per year by grants from the Socialdemocratic lead government indicating the position being a "patronage appointment", a practice commonly seen in Danish politics dominated by the Social Democrats.

== Personal life ==
Prehn has three children. One of his children, Nikoline Prehn (born 2002), is also a member of the Social Democrats, and was an unsuccessful candidate in the 2022 election.

Political offices
Preceded by Ulla Tørnæs	Minister for Development Cooperation; 2019–2020	Succeeded by Flemming Møller Mortensen
Preceded by Mogens Jensen	Minister for Food, Agriculture and Fisheries; 2020–	Succeeded by Incumbent
