= Sofie Therese Svendsen =

Danish politician (born 2002)

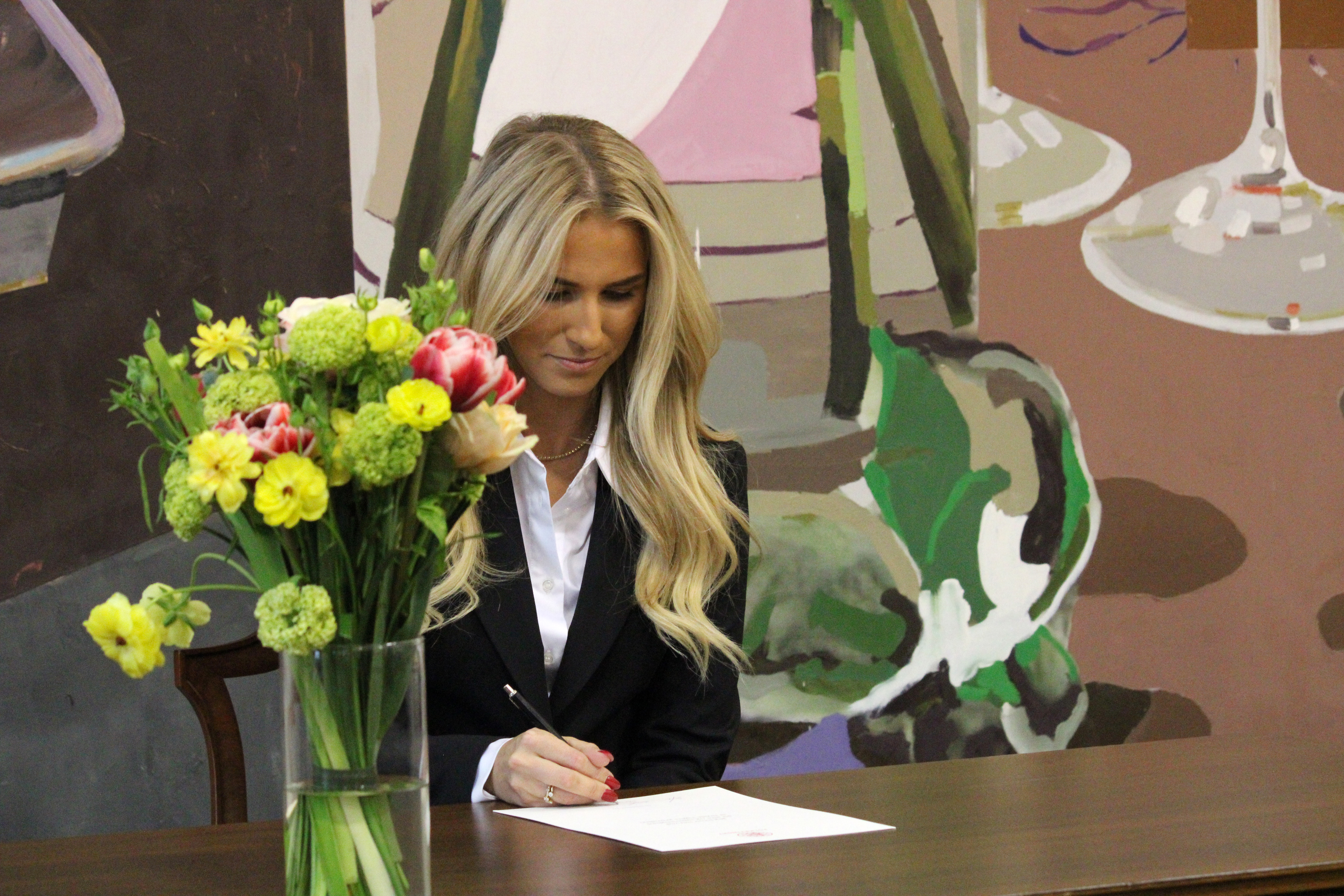
- Svendsen signing a pledge to uphold the Danish Constitution at Christiansborg, 14 April 2026

Member of the Folketing
- Incumbent
- Assumed office 24 March 2026
- Constituency: North Jutland

Personal details
- Born: 2002 (age 23–24)
- Party: Conservative People's Party

Sofie Therese Svendsen (born 2002) is a Danish politician who was elected member of the Folketing in 2026. She has been a municipal councillor of Aalborg since 2026.
