= Lisbeth Bech-Nielsen =

Danish politician

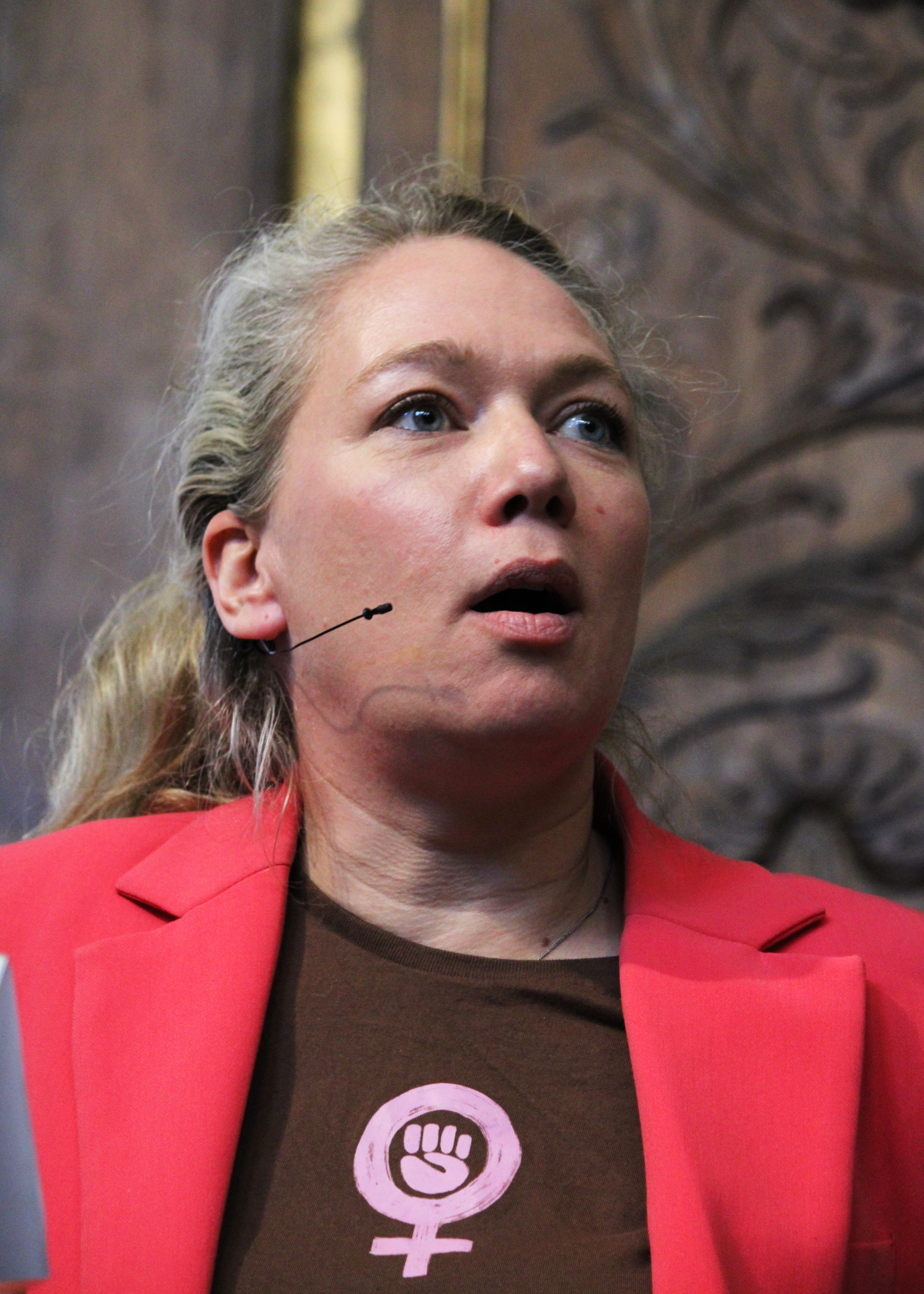
- Bech-Nielsen in 2026

Minister of Societal Resilience and Contingency
- Incumbent
- Assumed office 3 June 2026
- Prime Minister: Mette Frederiksen
- Preceded by: Torsten Schack Pedersen

Member of the Folketing
- Incumbent
- Assumed office 15 September 2011
- Constituency: North Jutland

Personal details
- Born: Lisbeth Bech Poulsen; 1 December 1982 (age 43) Sønderborg, Denmark
- Party: Socialist People's Party

Lisbeth Bech-Nielsen (née Poulsen; born 1 December 1982) is a Danish politician, who is a member of the Folketing for the Socialist People's Party. She was elected into the Folketing in the 2011 Danish general election.

== Political career ==
Bech-Nielsen first entered the Folketing after the 2011 election, receiving 1,334 votes. She was reelected with 1,652 votes in 2015. In both elections her seat was a levelling seat. In the 2019 election she received 2,645 votes, which was enough for a district seat.
