= Støvring Municipality =

Støvring Municipality Støvring Kommune
- Former municipalities of Denmark
- Interactive map of Støvring Municipality
- Country: Denmark
- Region: Region of North Jutland
- Seat: Støvring

Government
  - Mayor: Anny Winther (last)

Area
  - Total: 220 km^{2} (85 sq mi)

Population (2005)
  - Total: 28.457
  - Density: 0.13/km^{2} (0.34/sq mi)
- Time zone: UTC1 (CET)
  - Summer (DST): UTC2 (CEST)

Until 1 January 2007, Støvring Municipality was a municipality covering an area of 220 km², and with a total population of 13,057 (2005). Støvring municipality ceased to exist as the result of Kommunalreformen ("The Municipality Reform" of 2007). It was merged with Nørager and Skørping municipalities to form the new Rebild Municipality. This created a municipality with an area of 628 km² and a total population of 28,457 (2005).

== Mayors of Støvring Municipality ==
Name	Party	Time
Peter Kvist	Venstre	1970 - 1986
Holger Børresen	Venstre	1986 - 1990
Kjeld Jensen	Socialdemokratiet	1990 - 1998
Anny Winther	Venstre	1998 - 2007
