= List of members of the Folketing, 2015–2019 =

69th Folketing
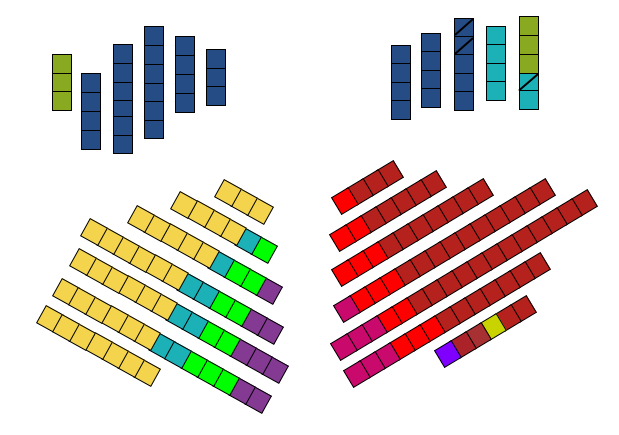
- Term: 18 June 2015 — 5 June 2019
- Speaker: O Pia Kjærsgaard
- Prime Minister: V Lars Løkke Rasmussen
- Cabinet: Løkke Rasmussen II; Løkke Rasmussen III
- Previous: 2011-2015
- Next: 2019-2022

This is a list of the 179 members of the Folketing, in the 2015 to 2019 session. They were elected at the 2015 general election.

== Election results ==
| Party | Votes | % | Seats | +/– |
Denmark proper
| Social Democrats | 924,940 | 26.3 | 47 | +3 |
| Danish People's Party | 741,746 | 21.1 | 37 | +15 |
| Venstre | 685,188 | 19.5 | 34 | –13 |
| Red–Green Alliance | 274,463 | 7.8 | 14 | +2 |
| Liberal Alliance | 265,129 | 7.5 | 13 | +4 |
| The Alternative | 168,788 | 4.8 | 9 | New |
| Danish Social Liberal Party | 161,009 | 4.6 | 8 | –9 |
| Socialist People's Party | 147,578 | 4.2 | 7 | –9 |
| Conservative People's Party | 118,003 | 3.4 | 6 | –2 |
| Christian Democrats | 29,077 | 0.8 | 0 | 0 |
| Independents | 3,066 | 0.1 | 0 | – |
| Invalid/blank votes | 41,073 | – | – | – |
| Total | 3,560,060 | 100 | 175 | 0 |
| Registered voters/turnout | 4,145,105 | 85.9 | – | – |
Faroe Islands
| Republic | 5,730 | 24.5 | 1 | +1 |
| Social Democratic Party | 5,666 | 24.3 | 1 | 0 |
| Union Party | 5,500 | 23.5 | 0 | –1 |
| People's Party | 4,368 | 18.7 | 0 | 0 |
| Progress | 749 | 3.2 | 0 | New |
| Centre Party | 605 | 2.6 | 0 | 0 |
| Self-Government Party | 403 | 1.7 | 0 | 0 |
| Independents | 345 | 1.5 | 0 | 0 |
| Total | 23,366 | 100 | 2 | 0 |
| Registered voters/turnout | | 65.6 | – | – |
Greenland
| Inuit Ataqatigiit | 7,904 | 38.5 | 1 | 0 |
| Siumut | 7,831 | 38.2 | 1 | 0 |
| Atassut | 1,526 | 7.4 | 0 | 0 |
| Democrats | 1,753 | 8.5 | 0 | 0 |
| Partii Naleraq | 962 | 4.7 | 0 | New |
| Invalid/blank votes | 538 | – | – | – |
| Total | 20,514 | 100 | 2 | 0 |
| Registered voters/turnout | 41,048 | 50.0 | – | – |
Source: DST, KVF, Qinersineq

== Seat distribution ==
Below is the distribution of the 179 seats as it appeared after the 2015 election, as well at the distribution at the end of the term.

| Party | Party leader | Elected seats | End seats | Change |
|---|---|---|---|---|
| A Social Democrats | Mette Frederiksen | 47 | 46 | ▼1 |
| B Social Liberal Party | Morten Østergaard | 8 | 8 | Steady |
| C Conservatives | Søren Pape Poulsen | 6 | 6 | Steady |
| F Socialist People's Party | Pia Olsen Dyhr | 7 | 7 | Steady |
| I Liberal Alliance | Anders Samuelsen | 13 | 13 | Steady |
| O Danish People's Party | Kristian Thulesen Dahl | 37 | 37 | Steady |
| V Liberals | Lars Løkke Rasmussen | 34 | 34 | Steady |
| Ø Red-Green Alliance | Johanne Schmidt-Nielsen (Note: Formally, the Red-Green Alliance have collective leadership, but Schmidt-Nielsen was their political spokesperson, and de facto leader of the party.) | 14 | 14 | Steady |
| Å The Alternative | Uffe Elbæk | 9 | 10 | ▲1 |
| TJ Republic | Høgni Hoydal | 1 | 1 | Steady |
| JF Social Democratic Party | Aksel V. Johannesen | 1 | 1 | Steady |
| IA Community of the People | Múte Bourup Egede | 1 | 1 | Steady |
| SI Forward | Kim Kielsen | 1 | - | ▼1 |
| NQ Descendants of our Country | Vittus Qujaukitsoq | - | 1 | ▲1 |

== Parliament members elected at the June 2015 election ==
| Name | Birth year | Party | Constituency |
|---|---|---|---|
| Mette Abildgaard | 1988 | C Conservatives | North Zealand |
| Pia Adelsteen | 1963 | O Danish People's Party | North Zealand |
| Karina Adsbøl | 1976 | O Danish People's Party | South Jutland |
| Alex Ahrendtsen | 1967 | O Danish People's Party | Funen |
| Yildiz Akdogan | 1973 | A Social Democrats | Copenhagen |
| Simon Emil Ammitzbøll-Bille | 1977 | I Liberal Alliance | Copenhagen |
| Hans Andersen | 1974 | V Liberals | North Zealand |
| Christine Antorini | 1965 | A Social Democrats | North Zealand |
| Ida Auken | 1978 | B Social Liberal Party | Copenhagen |
| Carsten Bach | 1975 | I Liberal Alliance | East Jutland |
| Britt Bager | 1976 | V Liberals | East Jutland |
| Lisbeth Bech-Nielsen | 1982 | F Socialist People's Party | North Jutland |
| Lise Bech | 1961 | O Danish People's Party | North Jutland |
| Pernille Bendixen | 1973 | O Danish People's Party | Funen |
| Kenneth Kristensen Berth | 1977 | O Danish People's Party | Greater Copenhagen |
| Liselott Blixt | 1965 | O Danish People's Party | Zealand |
| Mette Bock | 1957 | I Liberal Alliance | South Jutland |
| Erling Bonnesen | 1955 | V Liberals | Funen |
| Tilde Bork | 1993 | O Danish People's Party | East Jutland |
| Trine Bramsen | 1981 | A Social Democrats | Funen |
| Stine Brix | 1982 | Ø Red-Green Alliance | North Jutland |
| Henrik Brodersen | 1964 | O Danish People's Party | Zealand |
| Kirsten Brosbøl | 1977 | A Social Democrats | East Jutland |
| Morten Bødskov | 1970 | A Social Democrats | Greater Copenhagen |
| Bent Bøgsted | 1956 | O Danish People's Party | North Jutland |
| Jan Rytkjær Callesen | 1963 | O Danish People's Party | South Jutland |
| Erik Christensen | 1958 | A Social Democrats | Funen |
| René Christensen | 1970 | O Danish People's Party | Zealand |
| Villum Christensen | 1954 | I Liberal Alliance | Zealand |
| Kim Christiansen | 1956 | O Danish People's Party | East Jutland |
| Bjarne Corydon | 1973 | A Social Democrats | South Jutland |
| Henrik Dahl | 1960 | I Liberal Alliance | South Jutland |
| Jens Henrik Thulesen Dahl | 1961 | O Danish People's Party | Funen |
| Jonas Dahl | 1978 | F Socialist People's Party | East Jutland |
| Kristian Thulesen Dahl | 1969 | O Danish People's Party | South Jutland |
| Lennart Damsbo-Andersen | 1956 | A Social Democrats | Zealand |
| Thomas Danielsen | 1983 | V Liberals | West Jutland |
| Mette Hjermind Dencker | 1978 | O Danish People's Party | East Jutland |
| Mikkel Dencker | 1975 | O Danish People's Party | Greater Copenhagen |
| Pelle Dragsted | 1975 | Ø Red-Green Alliance | Copenhagen |
| Karina Due | 1966 | O Danish People's Party | West Jutland |
| Kaare Dybvad | 1984 | A Social Democrats | Zealand |
| Pia Olsen Dyhr | 1971 | F Socialist People's Party | Copenhagen |
| Christina Egelund | 1977 | I Liberal Alliance | North Jutland |
| Susanne Eilersen | 1964 | O Danish People's Party | South Jutland |
| Uffe Elbæk | 1954 | Å The Alternative | Copenhagen |
| Louise Schack Elholm | 1977 | V Liberals | Zealand |
| Karen Ellemann | 1969 | V Liberals | Greater Copenhagen |
| Jakob Ellemann-Jensen | 1973 | V Liberals | East Jutland |
| Benny Engelbrecht | 1970 | A Social Democrats | South Jutland |
| Søren Espersen | 1953 | O Danish People's Party | Zealand |
| Dennis Flydtkjær | 1978 | O Danish People's Party | West Jutland |
| Eva Flyvholm | 1981 | Ø Red-Green Alliance | Zealand |
| Josephine Fock | 1965 | Å The Alternative | East Jutland |
| Claus Hjort Frederiksen | 1947 | V Liberals | North Zealand |
| Mette Frederiksen | 1977 | A Social Democrats | Greater Copenhagen |
| René Gade | 1982 | Å The Alternative | West Jutland |
| Søren Gade | 1963 | V Liberals | North Zealand |
| Torsten Gejl | 1964 | Å The Alternative | North Jutland |
| Maria Reumert Gjerding | 1978 | Ø Red-Green Alliance | North Zealand |
| Mette Gjerskov | 1966 | A Social Democrats | Zealand |
| Karin Gaardsted | 1955 | A Social Democrats | West Jutland |
| Ane Halsboe-Jørgensen | 1983 | A Social Democrats | North Jutland |
| Aleqa Hammond | 1965 | SI Forward | Greenland |
| Claus Kvist Hansen | 1968 | O Danish People's Party | East Jutland |
| Eva Kjer Hansen | 1964 | V Liberals | South Jutland |
| Marlene Harpsøe | 1983 | O Danish People's Party | North Zealand |
| Orla Hav | 1952 | A Social Democrats | North Jutland |
| Jane Heitmann | 1968 | V Liberals | Funen |
| Martin Henriksen | 1980 | O Danish People's Party | Copenhagen |
| Preben Bang Henriksen | 1954 | V Liberals | North Jutland |
| Magnus Heunicke | 1975 | A Social Democrats | Zealand |
| Carl Holst | 1970 | V Liberals | South Jutland |
| Høgni Hoydal | 1966 | TJ Republic | Faroe Islands |
| Peter Hummelgaard | 1983 | A Social Democrats | Copenhagen |
| Henning Hyllested | 1954 | Ø Red-Green Alliance | South Jutland |
| Nick Hækkerup | 1968 | A Social Democrats | North Zealand |
| Karsten Hønge | 1958 | F Socialist People's Party | Funen |
| Bertel Haarder | 1944 | V Liberals | Zealand |
| Daniel Toft Jakobsen | 1978 | A Social Democrats | East Jutland |
| Jeppe Jakobsen | 1988 | O Danish People's Party | Zealand |
| Rasmus Jarlov | 1977 | C Conservatives | Greater Copenhagen |
| Marianne Jelved | 1943 | B Social Liberal Party | North Jutland |
| Jacob Jensen | 1973 | V Liberals | Zealand |
| Kristian Jensen | 1971 | V Liberals | West Jutland |
| Leif Lahn Jensen | 1967 | A Social Democrats | East Jutland |
| Michael Aastrup Jensen | 1976 | V Liberals | East Jutland |
| Mogens Jensen | 1963 | A Social Democrats | West Jutland |
| Thomas Jensen | 1970 | A Social Democrats | West Jutland |
| Jens Joel | 1978 | A Social Democrats | East Jutland |
| Jan Johansen | 1955 | A Social Democrats | Funen |
| Peter Juel-Jensen | 1966 | V Liberals | Bornholm |
| Christian Juhl | 1953 | Ø Red-Green Alliance | Zealand |
| Dan Jørgensen | 1975 | A Social Democrats | Funen |
| Jan E. Jørgensen | 1965 | V Liberals | Copenhagen |
| May-Britt Kattrup | 1962 | I Liberal Alliance | North Zealand |
| Naser Khader | 1963 | C Conservatives | East Jutland |
| Pia Kjærsgaard | 1947 | O Danish People's Party | Greater Copenhagen |
| Karen J. Klint | 1947 | A Social Democrats | South Jutland |
| Marcus Knuth | 1976 | V Liberals | Zealand |
| Peter Kofod | 1990 | O Danish People's Party | South Jutland |
| Simon Kollerup | 1986 | A Social Democrats | North Jutland |
| Astrid Krag | 1982 | A Social Democrats | Zealand |
| Marie Krarup | 1965 | O Danish People's Party | South Jutland |
| Henrik Dam Kristensen | 1957 | A Social Democrats | East Jutland |
| Christian Langballe | 1967 | O Danish People's Party | West Jutland |
| Rasmus Horn Langhoff | 1980 | A Social Democrats | Zealand |
| Esben Lunde Larsen | 1978 | V Liberals | West Jutland |
| Henrik Sass Larsen | 1966 | A Social Democrats | Zealand |
| Merete Dea Larsen | 1978 | O Danish People's Party | Zealand |
| Aaja Chemnitz | 1977 | IA Community of the People | Greenland |
| Karsten Lauritzen | 1983 | V Liberals | North Jutland |
| Bjarne Laustsen | 1953 | A Social Democrats | North Jutland |
| Martin Lidegaard | 1966 | B Social Liberal Party | North Zealand |
| Lars Chr. Lilleholt | 1965 | V Liberals | Funen |
| Annette Lind | 1969 | A Social Democrats | West Jutland |
| Laura Lindahl | 1983 | I Liberal Alliance | Copenhagen |
| Kristian Pihl Lorentzen | 1961 | V Liberals | West Jutland |
| Rune Lund | 1976 | Ø Red-Green Alliance | Funen |
| Mogens Lykketoft | 1946 | A Social Democrats | Greater Copenhagen |
| Sophie Løhde | 1983 | V Liberals | North Zealand |
| Morten Løkkegaard | 1964 | V Liberals | Greater Copenhagen |
| Christian Rabjerg Madsen | 1986 | A Social Democrats | South Jutland |
| Carolina Magdalene Maier | 1973 | Å The Alternative | Copenhagen |
| Morten Marinus | 1977 | O Danish People's Party | North Jutland |
| Jacob Mark | 1991 | F Socialist People's Party | Zealand |
| Anni Matthiesen | 1964 | V Liberals | South Jutland |
| Roger Courage Matthisen | 1976 | Å The Alternative | Funen |
| Mai Mercado | 1980 | C Conservatives | Funen |
| Jan Erik Messmann | 1948 | O Danish People's Party | North Zealand |
| Brian Mikkelsen | 1966 | C Conservatives | Zealand |
| Leif Mikkelsen | 1945 | I Liberal Alliance | West Jutland |
| Flemming Møller Mortensen | 1963 | A Social Democrats | North Jutland |
| Holger K. Nielsen | 1950 | F Socialist People's Party | Greater Copenhagen |
| Sofie Carsten Nielsen | 1975 | B Social Liberal Party | Greater Copenhagen |
| Rasmus Nordqvist | 1975 | Å The Alternative | Zealand |
| Karin Nødgaard | 1966 | O Danish People's Party | Zealand |
| Ellen Trane Nørby | 1980 | V Liberals | South Jutland |
| Ole Birk Olesen | 1972 | I Liberal Alliance | East Jutland |
| Joachim B. Olsen | 1977 | I Liberal Alliance | Greater Copenhagen |
| Maja Panduro | 1982 | A Social Democrats | East Jutland |
| Torsten Schack Pedersen | 1976 | V Liberals | North Jutland |
| Jesper Petersen | 1981 | A Social Democrats | South Jutland |
| Søren Pind | 1969 | V Liberals | Copenhagen |
| Christian Poll | 1965 | Å The Alternative | North Zealand |
| Ib Poulsen | 1965 | O Danish People's Party | North Jutland |
| Søren Pape Poulsen | 1971 | C Conservatives | West Jutland |
| Troels Lund Poulsen | 1976 | V Liberals | East Jutland |
| Rasmus Prehn | 1973 | A Social Democrats | North Jutland |
| Lars Løkke Rasmussen | 1964 | V Liberals | Zealand |
| Søren Egge Rasmussen | 1961 | Ø Red-Green Alliance | East Jutland |
| Mette Reissmann | 1963 | A Social Democrats | Copenhagen |
| Merete Riisager | 1976 | I Liberal Alliance | Funen |
| Lotte Rod | 1985 | B Social Liberal Party | South Jutland |
| Pernille Rosenkrantz-Theil | 1977 | A Social Democrats | Zealand |
| Anders Samuelsen | 1967 | I Liberal Alliance | North Zealand |
| Ulla Sandbæk | 1943 | Å The Alternative | Greater Copenhagen |
| Hans Christian Schmidt | 1953 | V Liberals | South Jutland |
| Johanne Schmidt-Nielsen | 1984 | Ø Red-Green Alliance | Copenhagen |
| Pernille Schnoor | 1967 | A Social Democrats | North Zealand |
| Hans Kristian Skibby | 1969 | O Danish People's Party | East Jutland |
| Pernille Skipper | 1984 | Ø Red-Green Alliance | Funen |
| Julie Skovsby | 1978 | A Social Democrats | Funen |
| Sjúrður Skaale | 1967 | JF Social Democratic Party | Faroe Islands |
| Peter Skaarup | 1964 | O Danish People's Party | Copenhagen |
| Zenia Stampe | 1979 | B Social Liberal Party | Zealand |
| Andreas Steenberg | 1983 | B Social Liberal Party | West Jutland |
| Inger Støjberg | 1973 | V Liberals | West Jutland |
| Jakob Sølvhøj | 1954 | Ø Red-Green Alliance | West Jutland |
| Søren Søndergaard | 1955 | Ø Red-Green Alliance | Greater Copenhagen |
| Finn Sørensen | 1946 | Ø Red-Green Alliance | Copenhagen |
| Mattias Tesfaye | 1981 | A Social Democrats | Greater Copenhagen |
| Helle Thorning-Schmidt | 1966 | A Social Democrats | Copenhagen |
| Trine Torp | 1970 | F Socialist People's Party | North Zealand |
| Dorthe Ullemose | 1964 | O Danish People's Party | Funen |
| Nikolaj Villumsen | 1983 | Ø Red-Green Alliance | East Jutland |
| Nicolai Wammen | 1971 | A Social Democrats | East Jutland |
| Lea Wermelin | 1985 | A Social Democrats | Bornholm |
| Morten Østergaard | 1976 | B Social Liberal Party | East Jutland |

== Party and member changes after the June 2015 elections ==
=== Party changes ===
Below are all parliament members that have joined another party or become independent during the term.

| Name | Old party | Constituency | New party | Date |
|---|---|---|---|---|
| Pernille Schnoor | A Social Democrats | North Zealand | Å The Alternative | 23 April 2016 |
| Aleqa Hammond | SI Forward | Greenland | . Independent | 22 August 2016 |
| Aleqa Hammond | . Independent | Greenland | NQ Descendants of our Country | 24 April 2018 |

=== Lasting member changes ===
Below are member changes that lasted through the entire term.

| Replacement | Birth year | Party | Constituency | Replaced MP | Date | Reason |
|---|---|---|---|---|---|---|
| Troels Ravn | 1961 | A Social Democrats | South Jutland | Bjarne Corydon | 12 Januar 2016 | Corydon resigned his seat. |
| Jakob Engel-Schmidt | 1983 | V Liberals | Greater Copenhagen | Morten Løkkegaard | 3 March 2016 | Løkkegaard resigned his seat. |
| Lars Aslan Rasmussen | 1978 | A Social Democrats | Copenhagen | Helle Thorning-Schmidt | 4 April 2016 | Thorning-Schmidt resigned her seat. |
| Kirsten N. Andersen | 1962 | F Socialist People's Party | East Jutland | Jonas Dahl | 8 August 2016 | Dahl resigned his seat. |
| Magni Arge | 1959 | TJ Republic | Faroe Islands | Høgni Hoydal | 11 December 2017 | Hoydal resigned his seat. |
| Øjvind Vilsholm | 1967 | Ø Red-Green Alliance | North Zealand | Maria R. Gjerding | 9 April 2018 | Gjerding resigned her seat. |
| Martin Geertsen | 1970 | V Liberals | Copenhagen | Søren Pind | 4 May 2018 | Pind resigned his seat. |
| Brigitte Klintskov Jerkel | 1969 | C Conservatives | Zealand | Brian Mikkelsen | 22 June 2018 | Mikkelsen resigned his seat. |
| Malou Lunderød | 1986 | A Social Democrats | North Zealand | Christine Antorini | 6 September 2018 | Antorini resigned her seat. |
| Carsten Kissmeyer | 1953 | V Liberals | West Jutland | Esben Lunde Larsen | 2 October 2018 | Larsen resigned his seat. |
| Julius Graakjær Grantzau | 1983 | Å The Alternative | East Jutland | Josephine Fock | 1 November 2018 | Fock resigned her seat. |

=== Temporary member changes ===
Below are temporary member replacements during the term.

| Replacement | Birth year | Party | Constituency | Replaced MP | Start | End | Length |
|---|---|---|---|---|---|---|---|
| Jeppe Bruus | 1978 | A Social Democrats | Greater Copenhagen | Mogens Lykketoft | 4 July 2015 | 30 September 2016 | 454 days |
| Magni Arge | 1959 | TJ Republic | Faroe Islands | Høgni Hoydal | 28 July 2015 | 10 December 2017 | 866 days |
| Rasmus Helveg Petersen | 1968 | B Social Liberal Party | Zealand | Zenia Stampe | 1 September 2015 | 31 December 2015 | 121 days |
| Per Husted | 1966 | A Social Democrats | North Jutland | Ane Halsboe-Jørgensen | 8 October 2015 | 27 April 2016 | 202 days |
| Carsten Kudsk | 1971 | O Danish People's Party | Funen | Alex Ahrendtsen | 21 October 2015 | 6 November 2015 | 16 days |
| Steen Holm Iversen | 1964 | I Liberal Alliance | South Jutland | Mette Bock | 22 October 2015 | 6 November 2015 | 15 days |
| Hans Christian Thoning | 1952 | V Liberals | South Jutland | Anni Matthiesen | 22 October 2015 | 6 November 2015 | 15 days |
| Fatma Øktem | 1973 | V Liberals | East Jutland | Michael Aastrup Jensen | 22 October 2015 | 6 November 2015 | 15 days |
| Rasmus Vestergaard Madsen | 1991 | Ø Red-Green Alliance | East Jutland | Nikolaj Villumsen | 26 October 2015 | 6 November 2015 | 11 days |
| Sisse Marie Welling | 1986 | F Socialist People's Party | Copenhagen | Pia Olsen Dyhr | 26 October 2015 | 6 November 2015 | 11 days |
| Nikolaj Amstrup | 1973 | Å The Alternative | Funen | Roger Courage Matthisen | 3 November 2015 | 2 May 2016 | 181 days |
| Jesper Kiel | 1966 | Ø Red-Green Alliance | Funen | Rune Lund | 3 November 2015 | 24 January 2016 | 82 days |
| Kasper Roug | 1979 | A Social Democrats | Zealand | Astrid Krag | 3 November 2015 | 3 June 2016 | 213 days |
| Malte Larsen | 1968 | A Social Democrats | East Jutland | Kirsten Brosbøl | 12 November 2015 | 18 March 2016 | 127 days |
| Ole Hækkerup | 1971 | A Social Democrats | Zealand | Kaare Dybvad | 13 November 2015 | 7 February 2016 | 86 days |
| Anders Johansson | 1981 | C Conservatives | Funen | Mai Mercado | 4 December 2015 | 19 January 2016 | 46 days |
| Hans Christian Thoning | 1952 | V Liberals | South Jutland | Carl Holst | 4 December 2015 | 2 March 2016 | 89 days |
| Emrah Tuncer | 1978 | B Social Liberal Party | Zealand | Zenia Stampe | 1 January 2016 | 31 March 2016 | 90 days |
| Malou Lunderød | 1986 | A Social Democrats | North Zealand | Nick Hækkerup | 1 February 2016 | 6 March 2016 | 34 days |
| Anne Paulin | 1988 | A Social Democrats | West Jutland | Thomas Jensen | 2 February 2016 | 3 June 2016 | 122 days |
| Anne Sina | 1987 | A Social Democrats | South Jutland | Jesper Petersen | 9 February 2016 | 18 March 2016 | 38 days |
| Malte Larsen | 1968 | A Social Democrats | East Jutland | Maja Panduro | 19 March 2016 | 30 June 2017 | 468 days |
| Peder Hvelplund | 1967 | Ø Red-Green Alliance | North Jutland | Stine Brix | 29 March 2016 | 28 February 2017 | 336 days |
| Sarah Glerup | 1985 | Ø Red-Green Alliance | Copenhagen | Pelle Dragsted | 4 April 2016 | 24 April 2016 | 20 days |
| Anders Johansson | 1981 | C Conservatives | Funen | Mai Mercado | 26 April 2016 | 27 November 2016 | 215 days |
| Johannes Lebech | 1948 | B Social Liberal Party | West Jutland | Andreas Steenberg | 10 May 2016 | 10 June 2016 | 31 days |
| Danny K. Malkowski | 1984 | I Liberal Alliance | Copenhagen | Laura Lindahl | 1 October 2016 | 31 December 2016 | 91 days |
| Carsten Kudsk | 1971 | O Danish People's Party | Funen | Alex Ahrendtsen | 4 October 2016 | 23 December 2016 | 80 days |
| Tórbjørn Jacobsen | 1955 | TJ Republic | Faroe Islands | Magni Arge | 18 October 2016 | 31 December 2016 | 74 days |
| Helle Osther Friedrichsen | 1963 | Ø Red-Green Alliance | North Zealand | Maria Reumert Gjerding | 26 October 2016 | 11 November 2016 | 16 days |
| Brigitte Klintskov Jerkel | 1969 | C Conservatives | Zealand | Brian Mikkelsen | 15 December 2016 | 21 June 2018 | 553 days |
| Anders Johansson | 1981 | C Conservatives | Funen | Mai Mercado | 15 December 2016 | 5 June 2019 | 902 days |
| Orla Østerby | 1952 | C Conservatives | West Jutland | Søren Pape Poulsen | 15 December 2016 | 5 June 2019 | 902 days |
| Bruno Jerup | 1957 | Ø Red-Green Alliance | Zealand | Eva Flyvholm | 1 January 2017 | 31 August 2017 | 242 days |
| Sanne Bjørn | 1974 | B Social Liberal Party | West Jutland | Andreas Steenberg | 31 January 2017 | 30 April 2017 | 89 days |
| Hans Christian Thoning | 1952 | V Liberals | South Jutland | Ellen Trane Nørby | 1 March 2017 | 10 May 2017 | 9 days |
| Klaus Markussen | 1975 | V Liberals | North Zealand | Hans Andersen | 20 March 2017 | 4 June 2017 | 76 days |
| Kristian Hegaard | 1991 | B Social Liberal Party | North Zealand | Martin Lidegaard | 18 April 2017 | 1 July 2017 | 74 days |
| Merete Scheelsbeck | 1986 | C Conservatives | Greater Copenhagen | Rasmus Jarlov | 2 May 2017 | 9 June 2017 | 38 days |
| Nikolaj Amstrup | 1973 | Å The Alternative | Funen | Roger Courage Matthisen | 8 September 2017 | 30 November 2017 | 83 days |
| Marianne Bredal | 1985 | V Liberals | West Jutland | Thomas Danielsen | 3 October 2017 | 15 March 2018 | 163 days |
| Per Husted | 1966 | A Social Democrats | North Jutland | Ane Halsboe-Jørgensen | 3 October 2017 | 31 May 2018 | 240 days |
| Malte Larsen | 1968 | A Social Democrats | East Jutland | Jens Joel | 3 October 2017 | 30 November 2017 | 58 days |
| Mads Fuglede | 1971 | V Liberals | Greater Copenhagen | Jakob Engel-Schmidt | 5 October 2017 | 5 June 2019 | 608 days |
| Marlene Borst Hansen | 1974 | B Social Liberal Party | South Jutland | Lotte Rod | 9 October 2017 | 31 July 2018 | 295 days |
| Claus Larsen-Jensen | 1953 | A Social Democrats | Bornholm | Lea Wermelin | 9 October 2017 | 2 April 2018 | 175 days |
| Jesper Kiel | 1966 | Ø Red-Green Alliance | Funen | Pernille Skipper | 10 October 2017 | 7 November 2017 | 28 days |
| Hans Christian Thoning | 1952 | V Liberals | South Jutland | Hans Christian Schmidt | 25 October 2017 | 10 November 2017 | 16 days |
| Carl Valentin | 1992 | F Socialist People's Party | Funen | Karsten Hønge | 25 October 2017 | 10 November 2017 | 16 days |
| Anders Stjernholm | 1980 | Å The Alternative | Greater Copenhagen | Ulla Sandbæk | 28 November 2017 | 3 March 2018 | 95 days |
| Jesper Kiel | 1966 | Ø Red-Green Alliance | Funen | Pernille Skipper | 30 November 2017 | 11 February 2018 | 73 days |
| Per Nørhave | 1954 | O Danish People's Party | Zealand | Merete Dea Larsen | 1 December 2017 | 21 August 2018 | 263 days |
| Tina Boel | 1960 | F Socialist People's Party | Zealand | Jacob Mark | 19 February 2018 | 25 February 2018 | 6 days |
| Rosa Lund | 1986 | Ø Red-Green Alliance | Copenhagen | Johanne Schmidt-Nielsen | 5 March 2018 | 28 February 2019 | 360 days |
| Kasper Roug | 1979 | A Social Democrats | Zealand | Rasmus Horn Langhoff | 12 March 2018 | 31 May 2018 | 80 days |
| Carsten Kudsk | 1971 | O Danish People's Party | Funen | Pernille Bendixen | 28 March 2018 | 14 May 2018 | 47 days |
| Carsten Hansen | 1957 | A Social Democrats | Funen | Trine Bramsen | 3 April 2018 | 1 June 2018 | 59 days |
| Jette Gottlieb | 1948 | Ø Red-Green Alliance | Copenhagen | Finn Sørensen | 17 April 2018 | 10 June 2018 | 54 days |
| Bjarni Hammer | 1975 | JF Social Democratic Party | Faroe Islands | Sjúrður Skaale | 7 May 2018 | 13 May 2018 | 6 days |
| Rasmus Vestergaard Madsen | 1991 | Ø Red-Green Alliance | East Jutland | Nikolaj Villumsen | 6 September 2018 | 1 February 2019 | 148 days |
| Rasmus Helveg Petersen | 1968 | B Social Liberal Party | Zealand | Zenia Stampe | 6 September 2018 | 7 May 2019 | 243 days |
| Merete Scheelsbeck | 1986 | C Conservatives | Greater Copenhagen | Rasmus Jarlov | 6 September 2018 | 5 June 2019 | 272 days |
| Serdal Benli | 1979 | F Socialist People's Party | Greater Copenhagen | Holger K. Nielsen | 30 September 2018 | 6 October 2018 | 6 days |
| Erik Lund | 1948 | C Conservatives | North Zealand | Mette Abildgaard | 8 October 2018 | 6 February 2019 | 121 days |
| Lene Foged | 1970 | I Liberal Alliance | West Jutland | Leif Mikkelsen | 25 October 2018 | 7 November 2018 | 13 days |
| Hans Christian Thoning | 1952 | V Liberals | South Jutland | Carl Holst | 25 October 2018 | 7 November 2018 | 13 days |
| Anne Marie Geisler Andersen | 1981 | B Social Liberal Party | North Zealand | Martin Lidegaard | 26 November 2018 | 11 January 2019 | 46 days |
| Peder Hvelplund | 1967 | Ø Red-Green Alliance | North Jutland | Stine Brix | 22 December 2018 | 7 May 2019 | 136 days |
| Malte Larsen | 1968 | A Social Democrats | East Jutland | Maja Panduro | 15 January 2019 | 7 May 2019 | 112 days |
| Henrik Old | 1947 | JF Social Democratic Party | Faroe Islands | Sjúrður Skaale | 15 January 2019 | 24 January 2019 | 9 days |
| Rigmor Dam | 1971 | JF Social Democratic Party | Faroe Islands | Sjúrður Skaale | 28 February 2019 | 7 March 2019 | 7 days |
