= Same-sex marriage in Denmark =

Same-sex marriage has been legal in Denmark since 15 June 2012. A bill for the legalization of same-sex marriages was introduced by the Thorning-Schmidt I Cabinet, and approved 85–24 by the Folketing on 7 June 2012. It received royal assent by Queen Margrethe II on 12 June and took effect three days later. Polling indicates that a significant majority of Danes support the legal recognition of same-sex marriage. Denmark was the fourth Nordic country, after Norway, Sweden and Iceland, the eighth in Europe and the eleventh in the world to legalize same-sex marriage. It was the first country in the world to enact registered partnerships, which provided same-sex couples with almost all of the rights and benefits of marriage, in 1989.

Same-sex marriage is also legal in the two other constituent countries of the Danish Realm. In Greenland, legislation to allow same-sex marriage passed the Inatsisartut by 27 votes to 0 on 26 May 2015. The Danish Parliament ratified the legislation on 19 January 2016, and the law took effect on 1 April 2016. In the Faroe Islands, same-sex marriage legislation passed the Løgting by a 19–14 vote on 29 April 2016. It was ratified by the Danish Parliament on 25 April 2017, received royal assent on 3 May, and took effect on 1 July 2017.

== Registered partnerships ==
Registered partnerships (Danish: registreret partnerskab, pronounced [ʁekiˈstʁeˀð̩ ˈpʰɑːtnɐˌskɛˀp]) were established in Denmark by a law passed on 7 June 1989, and which came into force on 1 October 1989. It was the first such law in the world. Attempts to expand the law in May 2003, in June 2003, and in June 2006 failed in Parliament. The law was successfully expanded regarding adoption rights and the care of children in June 2009, and in May 2010. On 17 March 2009, legislation granting registered partners the right to adopt children jointly was introduced to the Folketing. The bill was approved 60–54 on 4 May 2010 and took effect on 1 July 2010.

Registered partnerships had almost all the same qualities as marriage. All legal and fiscal rights and obligations were identical to those of opposite-sex marriages, with the following two exceptions: laws making explicit reference to the sexes of a married couple did not apply to registered partnerships; and regulations by international treaties did not apply unless all signatories agreed. Divorce for registered partners followed the same rules as opposite-sex divorces. Registered partners had to meet one of the following residency requirements to form a union: (1) one partner had to be a Danish citizen and be resident in Denmark, or (2) both parties must have been resident in Denmark for at least two years. Citizens of Finland, Iceland and Norway were treated as Danish citizens for the purpose of the residency requirement. Additionally, the Justice Ministry could order that a citizen of any other country with a registered partnership law similar to Denmark's be treated as a Danish citizen. Registered partnerships were conducted by civil ceremony only, but the Church of Denmark allowed priests to perform blessings of same-sex relationships. On 15 June 2012, the partnership law was repealed and replaced by a gender-neutral marriage law. Entering into new registered partnerships is no longer possible, though existing ones remain valid.

Denmark's role in being the first country in the world to provide almost all of the benefits of marriage to same-sex couples caught international attention. A two-year study of the registered partnership law by researcher Darren Spedale found that same-sex couples were more likely to register their union and less likely to divorce than opposite-sex married couples in Denmark. In particular, same-sex registered partners with children had very low rates of divorce as compared to opposite-sex couples.

== Same-sex marriage ==
=== Denmark ===
In 2006, five Social Liberal MPs introduced a resolution asking the Cabinet of Denmark to draft a gender-neutral marriage law. The resolution was debated in Parliament and opposed by members of the conservative governing coalition. The Minister for the Family, Carina Christensen, argued that registered partners already had the same rights as married partners except for the ability to marry in church, and thus that gender-neutral marriage was unnecessary. In January 2008, the Social Liberal Party's Equality Rapporteur, Lone Dybkjær, called for the legalization of same-sex marriage. The Copenhagen Mayor for Culture and Recreation, Pia Allerslev, from the liberal then-governing Venstre party, also publicly supported same-sex marriage, as did the Lord Mayor of Copenhagen, Ritt Bjerregaard.

In June 2010, the Parliament once again debated a same-sex marriage bill proposed by the opposition parties. It was rejected on a 52–57 vote. A motion calling for legalization was also voted down.

In October 2011, Manu Sareen, the Minister for Equality and Church Affairs, announced that the Thorning-Schmidt I Cabinet was seeking to legalize same-sex marriage by spring 2012. On 18 January 2012, the government published two draft bills. One of the bills would introduce a gender-neutral definition of marriage and allow same-sex couples to marry either in civil registry offices or in the Church of Denmark. In addition, registered partners would be able to convert their unions into marriages. The other bill would allow individual priests to refuse to conduct same-sex marriages. Other religious communities would also be allowed to conduct same-sex marriages but would not be compelled to do so. The bills were under consultation until 22 February 2012. On 14 March 2012, the cabinet submitted both bills to the Folketing. The bills were approved 85–24 on 7 June 2012 and received royal assent (kongelig stadfæstelse) by Queen Margrethe II on 12 June. The new laws took effect on 15 June 2012. The legislation was opposed by the Danish People's Party and the Christian Democrats, a religious conservative party, although the latter were not represented in the Danish Parliament at the time. Under the law, ministers can refuse to carry out same-sex marriage ceremonies, but they must arrange replacements for their church buildings. The first same-sex marriage in Denmark occurred on 15 June at the Frederiksberg Church in Copenhagen between Stig Elling and Steen Andersen, who had been together for 27 years.

Article 1 of the Marriage Act (Danish: Ægteskabsloven) was amended to read as follows:

Loven finder anvendelse på ægteskab mellem to personer af forskelligt køn og mellem to personer af samme køn.

(The law applies to marriages between two persons of different sex and between two persons of the same sex.)

7 June 2012 vote in the Folketing
Party	Voted for	Voted against	Abstained	Absent (Did not vote)
Venstre	18: Kim Andersen; Gitte Lillelund Bech; Peter Christensen; Karen Ellemann; Jakob Ellemann-Jensen; Lykke Friis; Martin Geertsen; Preben Bang Henriksen; Jacob Jensen; Michael Aastrup Jensen; Jan E. Jørgensen; Flemming Damgaard Larsen; Tina Nedergaard; Ellen Trane Nørby; Fatma Øktem; Hans Christian Schmidt; Inger Støjberg; Eyvind Vesselbo	9: Hans Andersen; Anne-Mette Winther Christiansen; Jane Heitmann; Birthe Rønn Hornbech; Peter Juel Jensen; Lars Christian Lilleholt; Anni Matthiesen; Troels Lund Poulsen; Ulla Tørnæs	2: Louise Schack Elholm; Torsten Schack Pedersen	18: Erling Bonnesen; Thomas Danielsen; Claus Hjort Frederiksen; Bertel Haarder; Eva Kjer Hansen; Henrik Høegh; Kristian Jensen; Karen Jespersen; Birgitte Josefsen; Esben Lunde Larsen; Karsten Lauritzen; Sophie Løhde; Kristian Pihl Lorentzen; Karsten Nonbo; Søren Pind; Lars Løkke Rasmussen; Mads Rørvig; Hans Christian Thoning
G Social Democrats	27: Sophie Hæstorp Andersen; Trine Bramsen; Kirsten Brosbøl; Lennart Damsbo-Andersen; Benny Engelbrecht; Mette Frederiksen; Mette Gjerskov; Karen Hækkerup; Ole Hækkerup; Ane Halsboe-Larsen; Orla Hav; Magnus Heunicke; Mogens Jensen; Jens Joel; Jan Johansen; Karen J. Klint; Jeppe Kofod; Simon Kollerup; Bjarne Laustsen; Annette Lind; Flemming Møller Mortensen; Maja Panduro; John Dyrby Paulsen; Troels Ravn; Mette Reissmann; Pernille Rosenkrantz-Theil; Julie Skovsby	–	–	17: Christine Antorini; Jacob Bjerregaard; Morten Bødskov; Bjarne Corydon; Karin Gaardsted; Nick Hækkerup; Carsten Hansen; Torben Hansen; Leif Lahn Jensen; Thomas Jensen; Henrik Dam Kristensen; Rasmus Horn Langhoff; Henrik Sass Larsen; Mogens Lykketoft; Rasmus Prehn; Helle Thorning-Schmidt; Nicolai Wammen
Danish People's Party	–	13: Pia Adelsteen; Karina Adsbøl; Alex Ahrendtsen; Liselott Blixt; Bent Bøgsted; Mette Hjermind Dencker; Jørn Dohrmann; Søren Espersen; Martin Henriksen; Marie Krarup; Christian Langballe; Morten Marinus; Hans Kristian Skibby	–	9: René Christensen; Kim Christiansen; Jens Henrik Thulesen Dahl; Kristian Thulesen Dahl; Mikkel Dencker; Dennis Flydtkjær; Pia Kjærsgaard; Karin Nødgaard; Peter Skaarup
G Danish Social Liberal Party	11: Liv Holm Andersen; Nadeem Farooq; Marianne Jelved; Sofie Carsten Nielsen; Rasmus Helveg Petersen; Lotte Rod; Manu Sareen; Zenia Stampe; Andreas Steenberg; Hans Vestager; Margrethe Vestager	–	–	6: Christian Friis Bach; Uffe Elbæk; Camilla Hersom; Lone Loklindt; Jeppe Mikkelsen; Morten Østergaard
G Socialist People's Party	11: Eigil Andersen; Pernille Vigsø Bagge; Özlem Sara Cekic; Jonas Dahl; Karina Lorentzen Dehnhardt; Steen Gade; Astrid Krag; Holger K. Nielsen; Jesper Petersen; Lisbeth Bech Poulsen; Annette Vilhelmsen	–	–	5: Ida Auken; Anne Baastrup; Pia Olsen Dyhr; Ole Sohn; Villy Søvndal
Red-Green Alliance	9: Jørgen Arbo-Bæhr; Stine Brix; Per Clausen; Lars Dohn; Henning Hyllested; Christian Juhl; Rosa Lund; Pernille Skipper; Nikolaj Villumsen	–	–	3: Frank Aaen; Johanne Schmidt-Nielsen; Finn Sørensen
Liberal Alliance	5: Simon Emil Ammitzbøll; Mette Bock; Villum Christensen; Leif Mikkelsen; Ole Birk Olesen	–	–	4: Thyra Frank; Joachim B. Olsen; Merete Riisager; Anders Samuelsen
Conservative People's Party	4: Lars Barfoed; Mai Henriksen; Mike Legarth; Per Stig Møller	2: Tom Behnke; Lene Espersen	–	2: Benedikte Kiær; Brian Mikkelsen
Inuit Ataqatigiit	–	–	–	1: Sara Olsvig
Siumut	–	–	–	1: Doris Jakobsen
Social Democratic Party	–	–	–	1: Sjúrður Skaale
Union Party	–	–	–	1: Edmund Joensen
Total	85	24	2	68
Total	47.5%	13.4%	1.1%	38.0%

In Danish, same-sex marriage is known as ægteskab mellem personer af samme køn or more commonly as homovielse (pronounced [ˈhoːmoˌviˀəlsə]) or kønsneutrale ægteskab (pronounced [ˈkʰœnsˌnœwtsʰʁɑˀlə ˈektəˌskɛˀp], meaning "gender-neutral marriage").

=== Greenland ===
Laws regarding same-sex partnerships in Europe¹ Marriage Civil union Limited domestic recognition (cohabitation) Unrecognized Constitution limits marriage to opposite-sex couples ¹ May include recent laws or court decisions that have not yet entered into effect.

Denmark's registered partnership law was extended to Greenland on 26 April 1996. Denmark's marriage law, as supported by the Naalakkersuisut, was to be considered by the Inatsisartut in the spring of 2014, but was postponed beyond the year due to early parliamentary elections. Legislation to grant same-sex couples marriage and adoption rights had its first reading on 25 March 2015. It was approved unanimously on second reading on 26 May 2015. Ratification of the legislation was required by the Danish Parliament, which approved the law on 19 January 2016. It came into effect on 1 April 2016.

Greenland's registered partnership law was repealed on the same day that the same-sex marriage law came into effect.

=== Faroe Islands ===
Denmark's registered partnership law was never extended to the Faroe Islands, and until 2017 it was the only Nordic region to not recognize same-sex unions in any form. A set of bills to extend the Danish gender-neutral marriage law to the Faroe Islands was submitted to the Løgting on 20 November 2013, though was rejected at second reading on 13 March 2014.

Following the Faroese general election in September 2015, a same-sex marriage bill was submitted to the Parliament. It received a first reading on 24 November 2015. On 26 April 2016, following a significant amount of parliamentary maneuvering, the bill passed its second reading by a vote of 19–14. It passed its final reading on 29 April 2016. The Danish Parliament voted unanimously to ratify the changes to its own marriage law on 25 April 2017. Minister of Justice Søren Pape Poulsen subsequently allowed the law to go into effect on 1 July 2017. Legislation exempting the Church of the Faroe Islands from performing same-sex marriages passed the Faroese Parliament on 30 May, and went into effect on 1 July alongside the new marriage law. The first same-sex wedding in the Faroe Islands was performed on 6 September 2017.

=== Impact ===
A study by the Danish Research Institute for Suicide Prevention (Dansk Forskningsinstitut for Selvmordsforebyggelse), released in 2019, showed that the legalisation of same-sex marriage, as well as other supportive policies and legislation, had decreased the suicide rate among same-sex partners. The study, conducted in both Sweden and Denmark, found a 46% fall in suicides of people in same-sex unions between the periods 1989–2002 and 2003–2016, compared to 28% among heterosexual couples.

=== Statistics ===
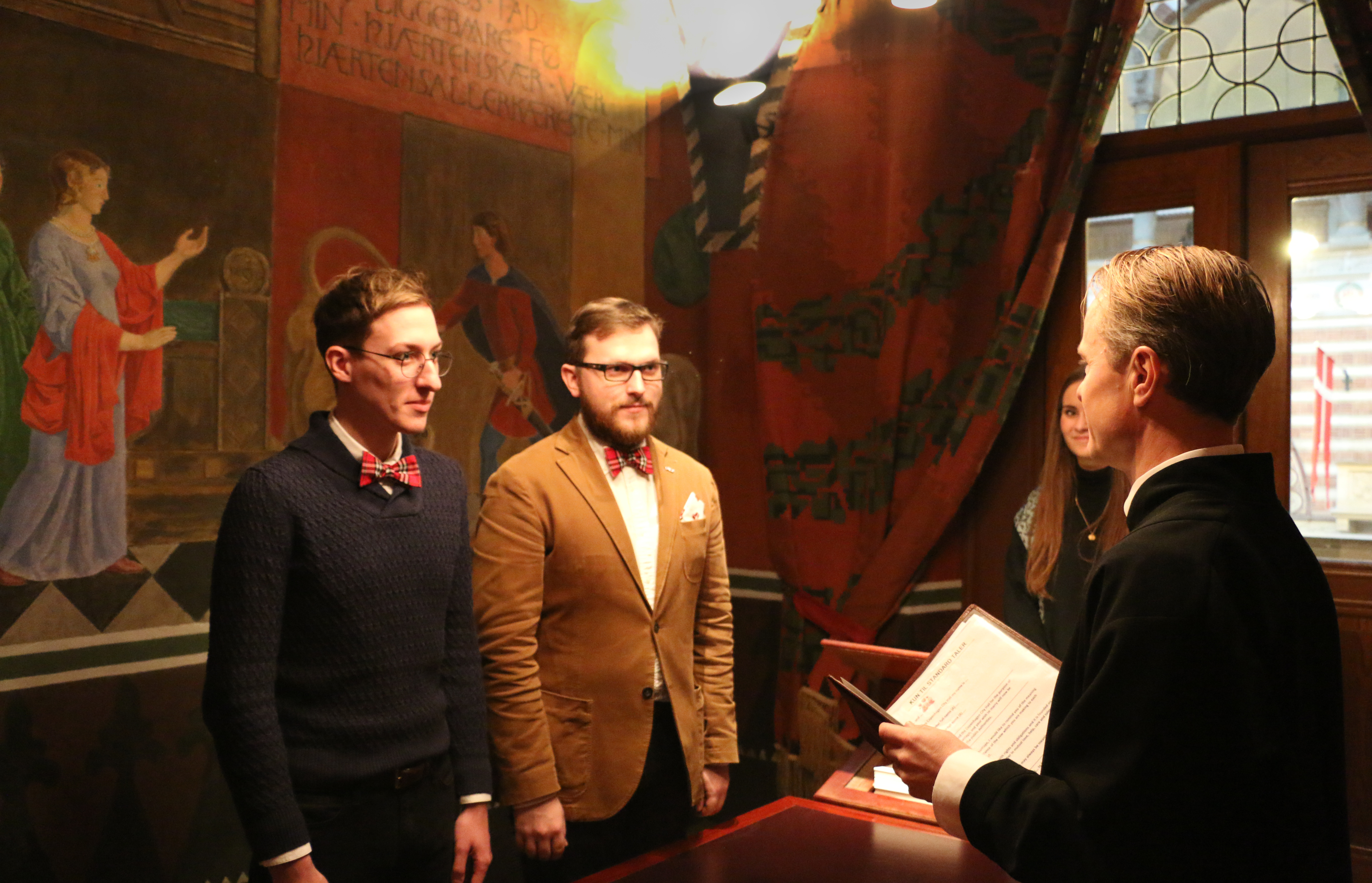
Russian couple Pavel Stotsko and Evgenii Voitsekhovskii marrying at Copenhagen City Hall, January 2018

The number of same-sex marriages performed in Denmark (excluding Greenland and the Faroe Islands) is shown in the table below. In 2021, the majority of same-sex marriages (79%) were performed in a civil ceremony, while 21% took place in a religious ceremony in the Church of Denmark. One marriage was performed in an embassy or consulate outside of Denmark.

Number of marriages performed in Denmark
Year	Same-sex marriages			Opposite-sex marriages	Total marriages	% same-sex
Year	Male	Female	Total	Opposite-sex marriages	Total marriages	% same-sex
2012	104	164	268	28,235	28,503	0.94%
2013	129	234	363	27,140	27,503	1.32%
2014	155	209	364	27,967	28,331	1.28%
2015	163	208	371	28,482	28,853	1.29%
2016	160	218	378	30,389	30,767	1.23%
2017	190	246	436	31,341	31,777	1.37%
2018	187	293	480	32,045	32,525	1.48%
2019	168	237	405	30,230	30,635	1.32%
2020	160	273	433	28,106	28,539	1.51%
2021	172	258	430	27,215	27,645	1.56%
2022	214	296	510	32,544	33,054	1.54%
2023	220	294	514	31,068	31,582	1.63%
2024	235	359	594	32,267	32,861	1.81%
2025	249	344	593	32,031	32,624	1.82%

=== Religious performance ===
Same-sex marriages can be officiated at places of worship of the Church of Denmark and the Church of Greenland, but not the Church of the Faroe Islands, which under the 2017 law that legalised same-sex marriage in the Faroe Islands is exempt from performing same-sex weddings. One of the first same-sex marriage ceremonies in the Church of Denmark occurred on 16 June 2012 at the Højdevang Church on Amager for Poul Cullura and Nicolai Bøcker Jensen. Previously, a priest, Harald Søbye, had married several same-sex couples. He first officiated at the marriage of a male same-sex couple on 8 February 1973 on the suggestion of a journalist from the Ekstra Bladet newspaper, which reported it as "the world's first gay wedding". On 25 February 1973, Søbye performed another wedding in a television programme, which was widely reported in the media. Over the following 15 years, Søbye performed approximately 210 blessings or weddings of same-sex couples. The marriages were not legally recognized, and proved controversial within the Church. The Old Catholic Church in Sweden and Denmark and the Forn Siðr — Ásatrú and Vanatrú Association in Denmark also support and solemnise same-sex marriages.

The Catholic Church opposes same-sex marriage and does not allow its priests to officiate at such marriages. In December 2023, the Holy See published Fiducia supplicans, a declaration allowing Catholic priests to bless couples who are not considered to be married according to church teaching, including the blessing of same-sex couples. The Bishop of Copenhagen, Czeslaw Kozon, reacted to the declaration, "Everyone must be able to feel at home in the Church, accepted and loved, even if they cannot receive all sacraments... Living in a relationship that is not a marriage, including as persons of the same sex, must therefore not mean a lack of care on the part of the institutional Church or from the community of the congregation. Sexual orientation is not chosen voluntarily... A relationship between two people of the same sex can also contain values such as care and faithfulness..."

== Public opinion ==
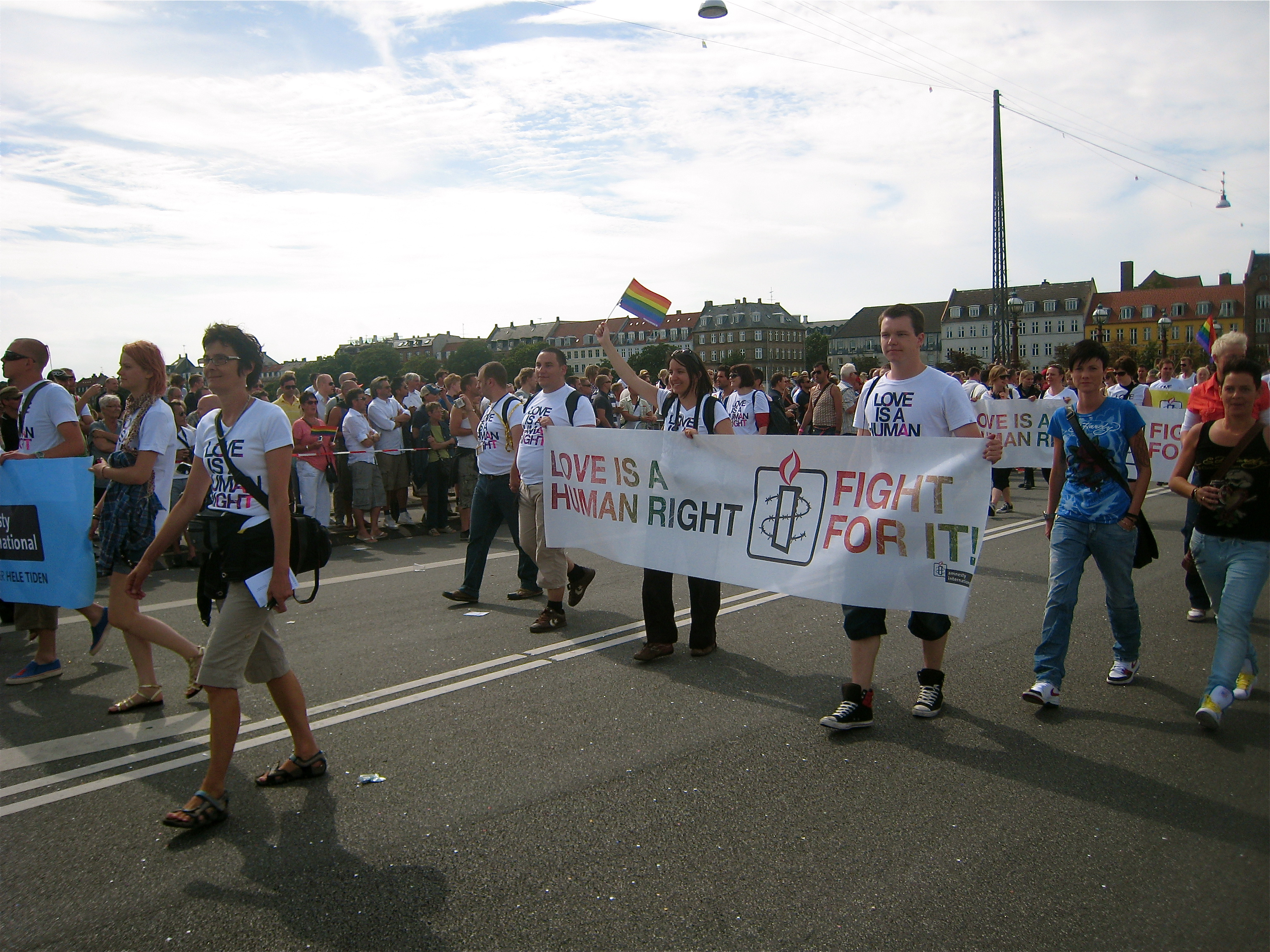
Amnesty International campaigning for same-sex marriage at Copenhagen Pride, 2009

A YouGov poll conducted between 27 December 2012 and 6 January 2013 found that 79% of Danes supported same-sex marriage and 16% were opposed. The remaining 6% had no opinion on the issue. The same poll also showed that 59% supported same-sex couples' right to adopt, while 31% were opposed and 11% had no opinion.

A May 2013 Gallup survey from the Faroe Islands found that 68% favoured civil marriage for same-sex couples, with 27% against and 5% undecided. All regions showed majority support and no age groups had more opponents than supporters. A 2014 poll from the Faroe Islands showed that 62% of respondents supported same-sex marriage. The regional divide was significant; support was greater on Streymoy (71% in Norðurstreymoy and 76% in Suðurstreymoy), which includes the capital Tórshavn, than in Norðoyar (42%) and Eysturoy (48%). An August 2014 Faroese poll asking 600 respondents for their views on civil marriage for same-sex couples showed that 61% supported the idea, while 32% were opposed and 7% had no opinion.

The 2015 Eurobarometer found that 87% of Danes supported same-sex marriage, while 9% were opposed and 4% were undecided. A Pew Research Center poll, conducted between April and August 2017 and published in May 2018, showed that 86% of Danes supported same-sex marriage, 9% were opposed and 5% did not know or had refused to answer. When divided by religion, 92% of religiously unaffiliated people, 87% of non-practicing Christians and 74% of church-attending Christians supported same-sex marriage. Among 18–34-year-olds, opposition to same-sex marriage was 6%. The 2019 Eurobarometer found that 89% of Danes thought same-sex marriage should be allowed throughout Europe, while 8% were opposed. The 2023 Eurobarometer showed that support had increased to 93%, while 5% were opposed. The survey also found that 93% of Danes thought that "there is nothing wrong in a sexual relationship between two persons of the same sex", while 6% disagreed.

== See also ==
- Axel and Eigil Axgil
- LGBT rights in Denmark
- LGBT rights in the Faroe Islands
- LGBT rights in Greenland
- Recognition of same-sex unions in Europe
