= Keld Nielsen =

Danish handball player (born 1957)

Personal information
- Nationality: Danish
- Born: 12 September 1957 (age 69) Copenhagen, Denmark

Sport
- Sport: Handball
- Position: Left wing

Senior clubs
- Years: Team
- ?-1986: SAGA
- 1986-?: Kristiansand IF
National team
Years	Team	Apps	(Gls)
1978-1987	Denmark	106	(274)

Teams managed
- 1997-1999: Denmark

Keld Nielsen (born 12 December 1957) is a Danish former handball player and handball coach who both played for and coached the Danish national team. As a player he competed in the 1984 Summer Olympics.

He played 106 matches for the Danish national team, scoring 274 goals. His national team debut was on 28 October 1978 in a 15:23 defeat against DDR. He scored one goal in the match. In 1984 he finished fourth with the Denmark men's national handball team in the 1984 Olympic tournament. He played five matches and scored eight goals.

He played his club handball with SAGA (Samvirkets Atletik- og Gymnastik Afdeling) in Denmark and Kristiansand IF in Norway.

== National team coach ==
Nielsen was the Danish national team coach between 1997 and 1999. He coached the team at the 1999 World Men's Handball Championship, but a disappointing result where Denmark was knocked out by Cuba in the round of 16, would lead to him being fired. He replaced by Leif Mikkelsen.

Immediately afterwards, he was offered the position as the head coach of the Egyptian national team, but he rejected it as he did not wish to move away from Denmark.
