= Stig Elling =

Danish businessman and politician

Stig Elling (born 15 March 1947 in Kongens Lyngby) is a Danish businessman, sales director at TUI Nordic and politician.

== Career ==
In 1980, he founded Sol-Rejser, which subsequently merged with Fritidsrejser, Falke Rejser and Team Sterling and became TUI Nordic, a branch of TUI Group. He became its sales director in 1986. In 2005, he was elected to the Frederiksberg Municipal Council as a member of the Conservative People's Party.

He came out as gay in his 2007 autobiography Hele Sandheden (The Whole Truth). Having previously lived in a registered partnership with his partner Steen Andersen, they married in Copenhagen on 15 June 2012, marking the first same-sex marriage in Denmark. Elling grew up Catholic but later joined the Church of Denmark as a protest against the child abuse cases in the Catholic Church.
