= Jakob Engel-Schmidt =

Danish politician

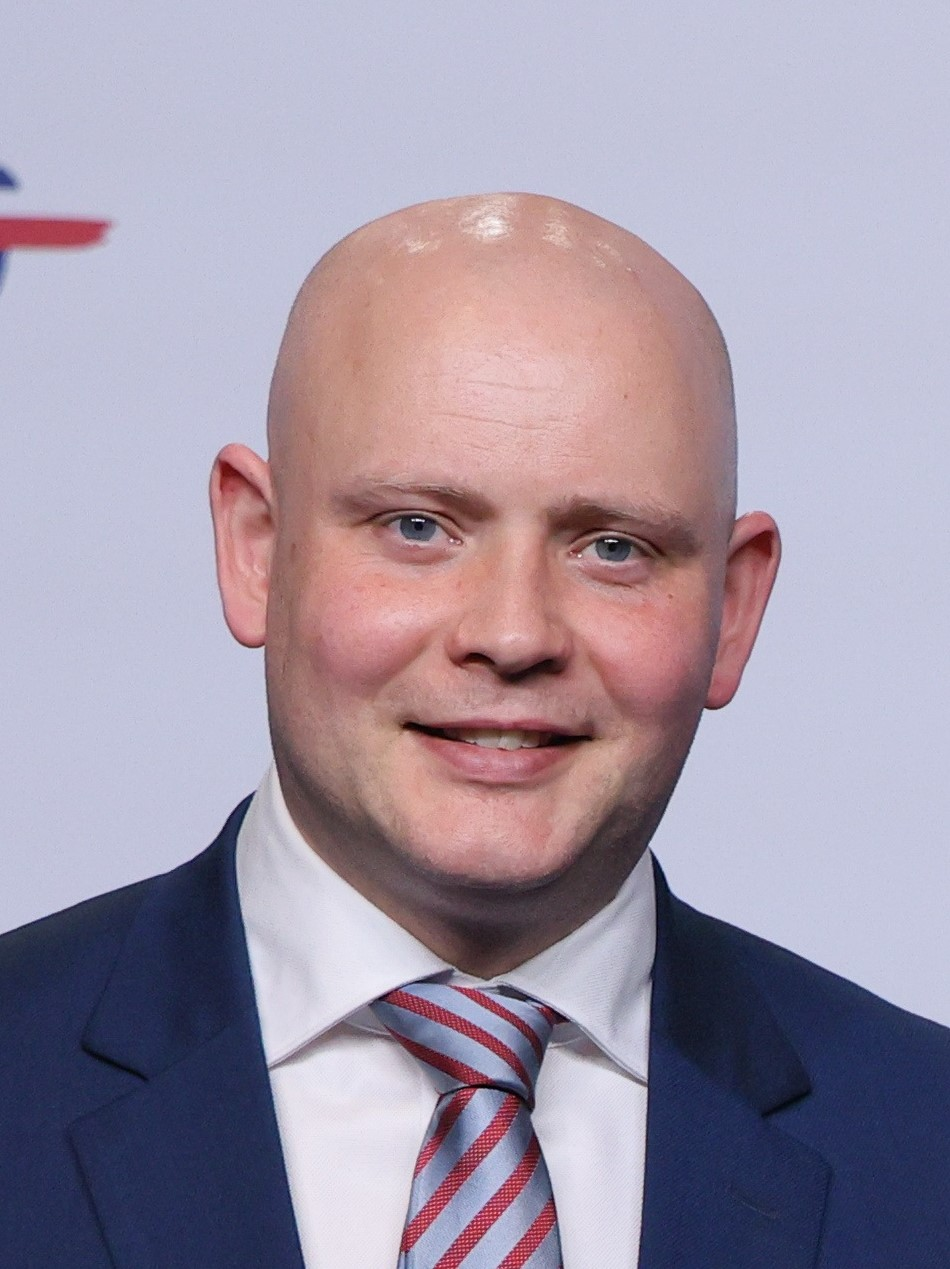
- Engel-Schmidt in 2025

Minister for Taxation
- Incumbent
- Assumed office 3 June 2026
- Prime Minister: Mette Frederiksen
- Preceded by: Ane Halsboe-Jørgensen

Minister for Culture
- In office 15 December 2022 – 3 June 2026
- Prime Minister: Mette Frederiksen
- Preceded by: Ane Halsboe-Jørgensen
- Succeeded by: Zenia Stampe

Member of the Folketing
- Incumbent
- Assumed office 1 November 2022
- Constituency: North Zealand
- In office 3 March 2016 – 5 June 2019
- Preceded by: Morten Løkkegaard
- Succeeded by: Mads Fuglede
- Constituency: Greater Copenhagen
- In office 15 August 2013 – 18 June 2015
- Preceded by: Gitte Lillelund Bech
- Constituency: Greater Copenhagen

Personal details
- Born: 24 October 1983 (age 42) Birkerød, Denmark
- Party: Moderates; Venstre (until 2022)

Jakob Engel-Schmidt (born 24 October 1983) is a Danish politician and Member of the Folketing from the Moderates. Since 15 December 2022 he has been minister for culture in the Frederiksen II Cabinet.

== Political career ==
In the 2009 Danish local elections, he ran unsuccessfully in Rudersdal Municipality.

He was a Venstre parliamentary candidate in the Lyngby constituency in the 2011 Danish general election and won 2,234 personal votes, but not enough to win a seat. The radio host Jarl Cordua endorsed him, calling him "an excellent liberal candidate".

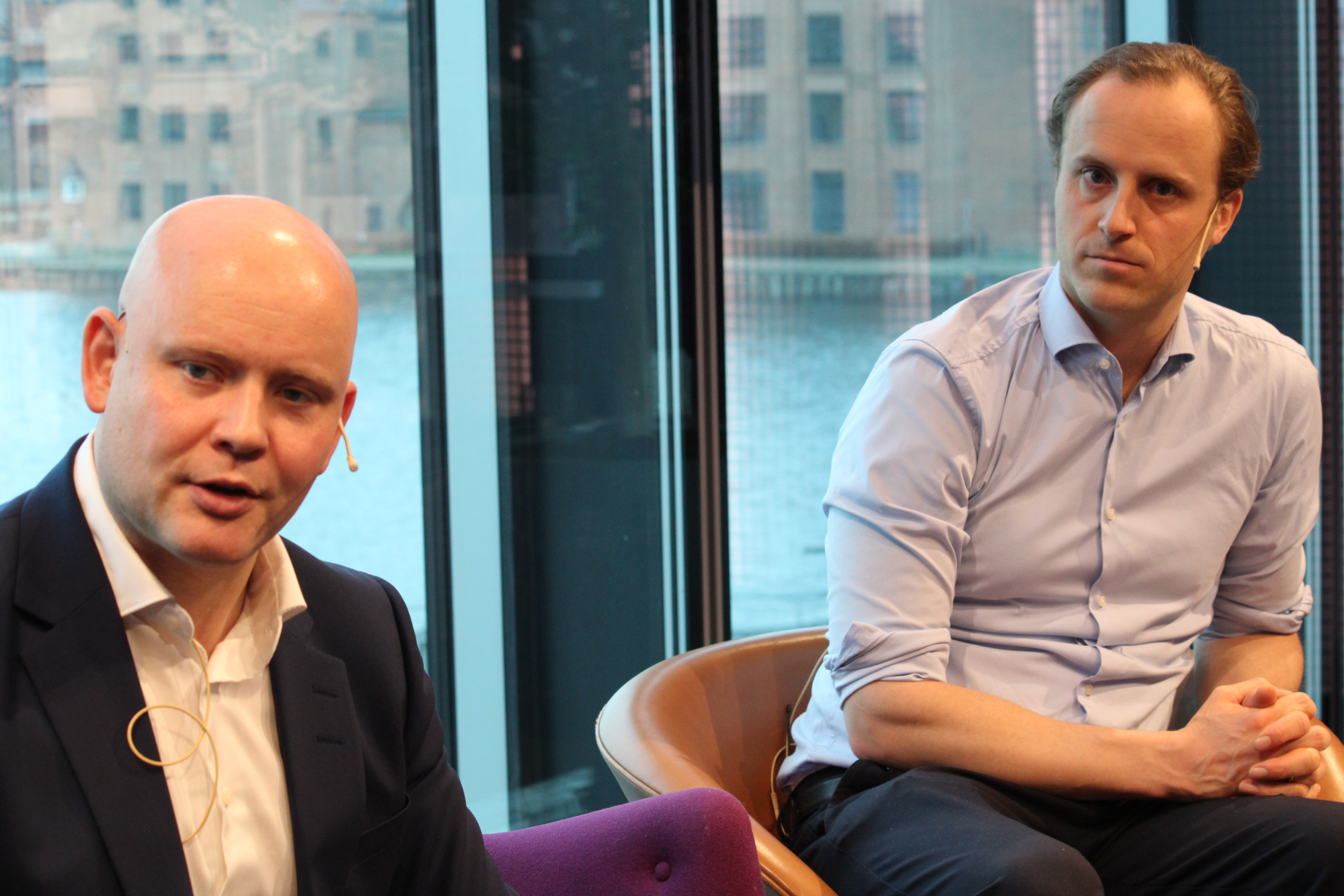
Engel-Schmidt speaking with Danish businessman Christian Arnstedt in Copenhagen, 2025

On 15 August 2013, he instead entered the Folketing as a substitute for Gitte Lillelund Bech who resigned from parliament.

In 2022, he left Venstre and joined the Moderates. On 15 December, he was appointed minister of culture in Mette Frederiksen's second cabinet.

In 2024 he issued a statement in Berlingske newspaper expressing his belief that Russian athletes should be banned from major international sports evens including e-sports, he said "As long as Russia continues its illegal war of aggression in Ukraine, I do not believe that Russian athletes should be allowed to participate in international sports. This of course also applies to e-sports"
