= Paula Larrain =

Danish journalist, author and politician (born 1970)

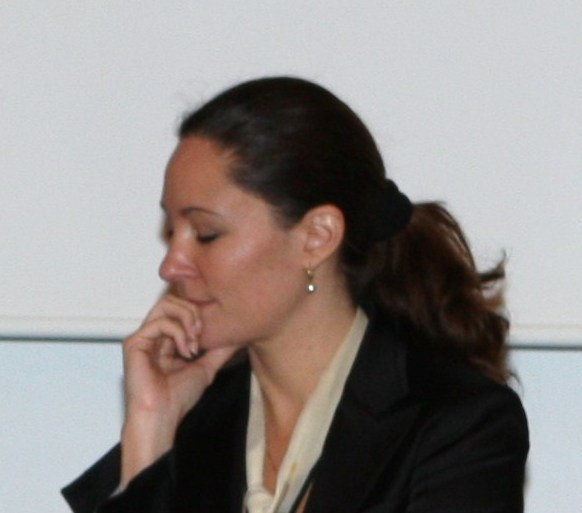
- Born: Paula Gabriela Alvarez Larrain; 29 January 1970 (age 56); Valparaíso, Chile
- Other name: Paula Gabriela Larrain Bjørn
- Political party: Conservative People's Party
- Spouse(s): Morten Løkkegaard (div.); Frederik Bjørn (mar. 2015)

Paula Gabriela Larrain Bjørn (born Paula Gabriela Alvarez Larrain; 29 January 1970 in Valparaíso, Chile) is a Danish journalist, author and politician. In the course of her career, she has written and presented for a variety of news organisations in Denmark. She has authored two books: I morgen skal vi hjem (2003) and Uden for citat (2008).

In addition to her journalistic career, Larrain was briefly a candidate for the Conservative People's Party. She ran during the 2007 Danish general election and again in 2008, but was not elected.

== Biography ==
Larrain was born on 29 January 1970 in Valparaíso, Chile. At the age of four, she was forced to leave Chile along with her parents and older sister. Her father had been a member of the Chilean Navy, and some statements he made following the 1973 Chilean coup d'état against President Salvador Allende forced him and his family to become political refugees. The family moved to Denmark. Initially, they lived in Brøndby, though Larrain's father's work took the family to Vallensbæk and eventually Esbjerg. She and her family were not allowed to return to Chile for many years. She wrote of her long-awaited return in her 2003 autobiography, I morgen skal vi hjem. Of her family, she is the only one who remains in Denmark, as her father has moved to Chile, her mother to Greenland, and her sister to London.

At the age of 18, Larrain started writing for her local newspaper, Esbjerg Ugeavis. She graduated from the Danish School of Journalism in Aarhus in 1994, and has since worked as a journalist for a variety of publications in Denmark, including the Danish Broadcasting Cooperation, Berlingske, Ekstra Bladet, TV Avisen, and Journalisten. Her first novel, Uden for citat, was published in 2008. The book was satirically critical of media and the Danish political process.

Larrain was a candidate for the Conservative People's Party in Copenhagen during the 2007 Danish general election. She received 2,230 votes, though she lost the election to Helle Sjelle. She was unanimously nominated by the party to run again in 2008, this time for the Hillerød constituency. Larrain was not elected, and has since withdrawn from her political career. She then became the campaign manager of the Danish Shipowners' Association tasked with recruiting young Danes.

Larrain was previously married to Morten Løkkegaard and the couple have a son, though they have since separated. In 2015, she married Frederik Bjørn, with whom she has a second son.

== Bibliography ==
- I morgen skal vi hjem, 2003
- Uden for citat, 2008
