= Ane Halsboe-Jørgensen =

Danish politician (born 1983)

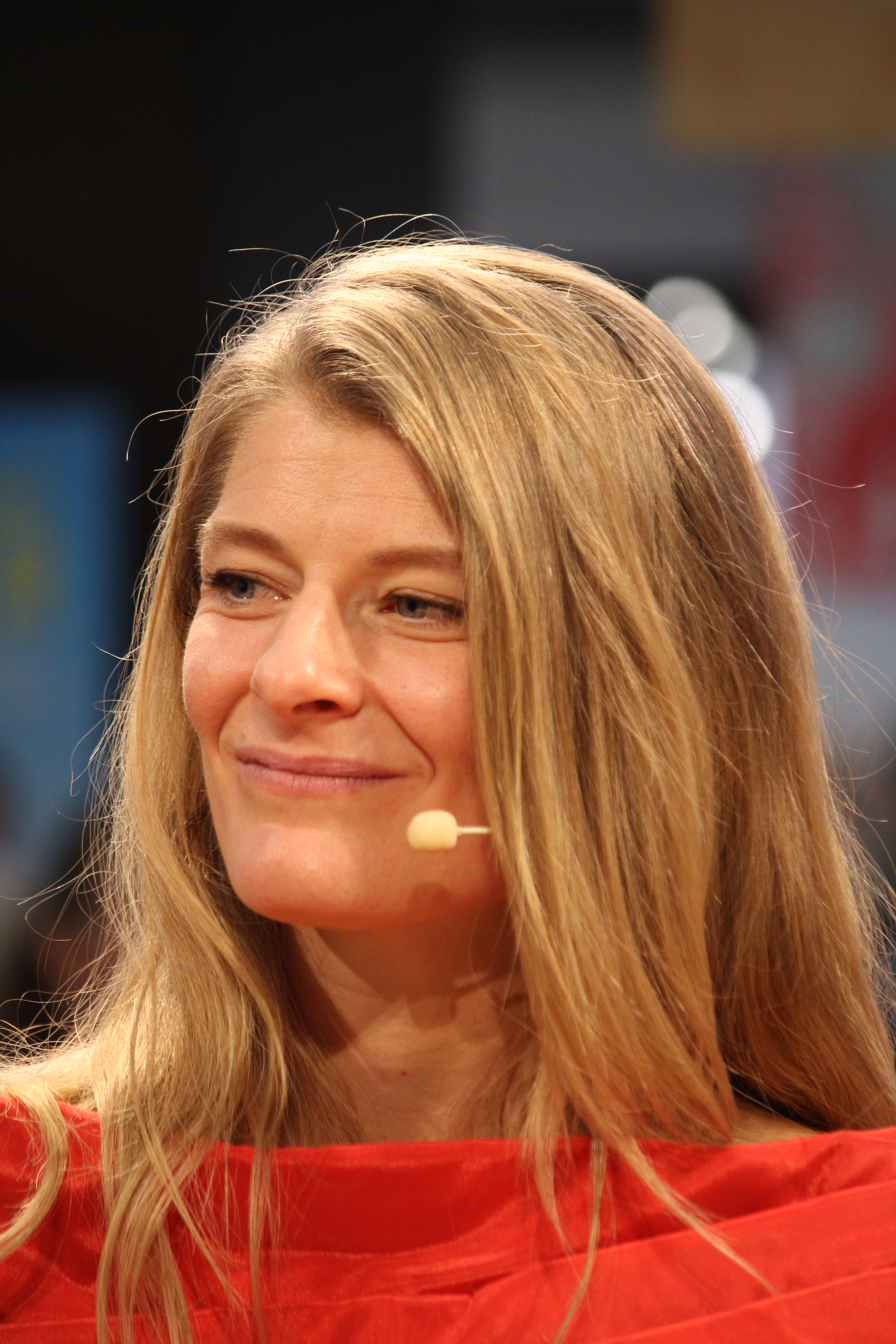
- Halsboe-Jørgensen in 2025

Minister for Employment
- In office 15 December 2022 – 23 September 2025
- Prime Minister: Mette Frederiksen
- Preceded by: Peter Hummelgaard Thomsen
- Succeeded by: Kaare Dybvad Bek

Minister for Culture and Ecclesiastical Affairs
- In office 16 August 2021 – 15 December 2022
- Prime Minister: Mette Frederiksen
- Preceded by: Joy Mogensen
- Succeeded by: Jakob Engel-Schmidt (Culture); Louise Schack Elholm (Ecclesiastical Affairs)

Minister of Higher Education and Science
- In office 27 June 2019 – 16 August 2021
- Prime Minister: Mette Frederiksen
- Preceded by: Tommy Ahlers
- Succeeded by: Jesper Petersen

Member of the Folketing
- Incumbent
- Assumed office 15 September 2011
- Constituency: North Jutland

Personal details
- Born: 4 May 1983 (age 43) Brovst, Denmark
- Party: Social Democrats

Ane Halsboe-Jørgensen (born 4 May 1983) is a Danish politician, who is a member of the Folketing for the Social Democrats. She has been the Minister of Taxation since 23 September 2025.

She was elected member of Folketinget for the Social Democrats in 2011. She was appointed Minister of Higher Education and Science in the Frederiksen Cabinet from 27 June 2019. On 16 August 2021, the former Minister of Church and Ecclesiastical Affairs Joy Mogensen resigned and Halsboe-Jørgensen took over the position. She then became Minister of Employment in late 2022.

== Political career ==
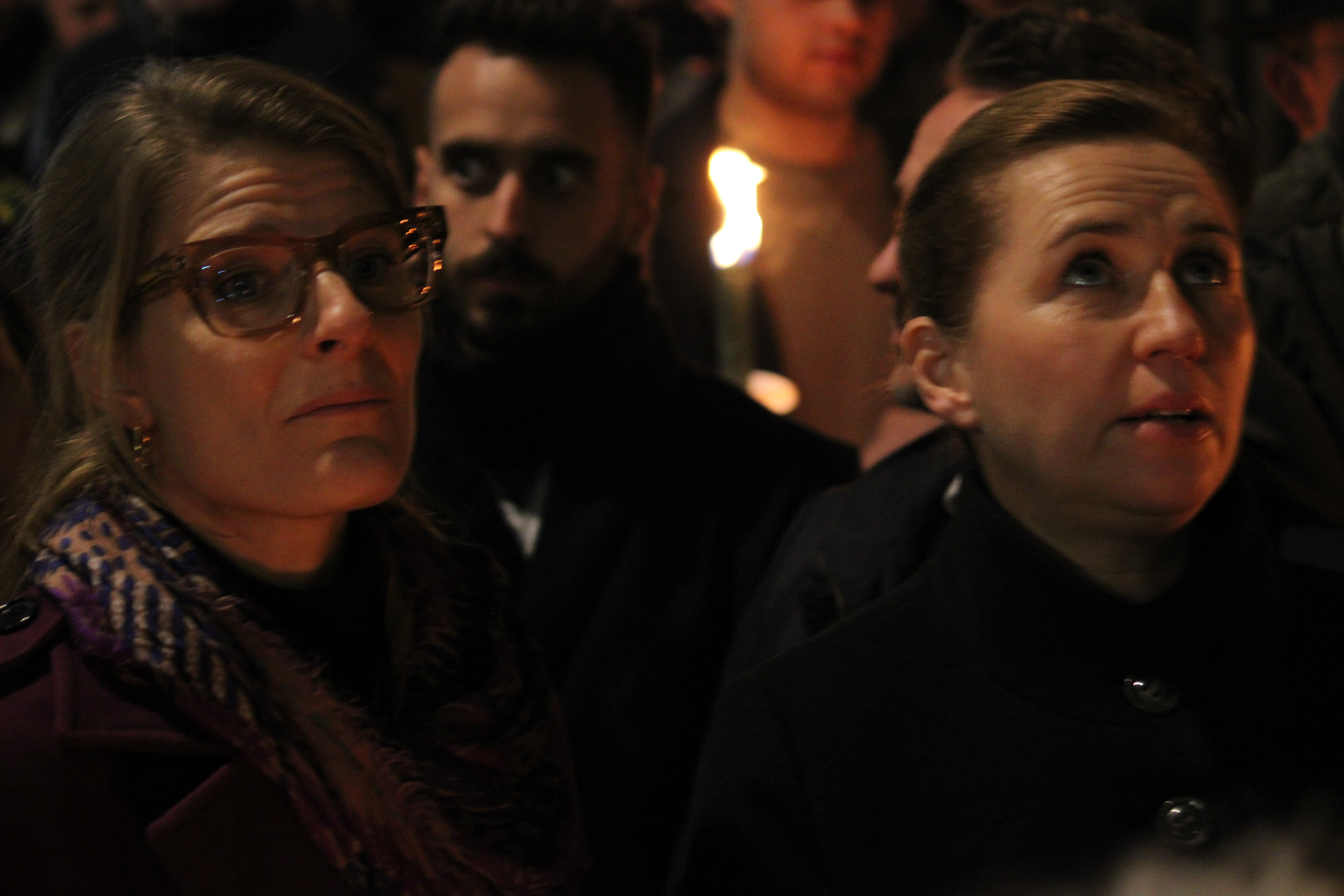
Halsboe-Jørgensen with prime minister Mette Frederiksen, 2025

Halsboe-Jørgensen was first elected into parliament at the 2011 Danish general election, where she received 5,171 votes. She was reelected in 2015 with 8,285 votes and in 2019 with 4,977 votes.

After a cabinet reshuffle in September 2025 she became Denmark's first female Minister of Taxation.

== Publications ==
It pays to invest in people: a book about social investments, early intervention, the Ministry of Finance's calculation models and SØM (with Pernille Rosenkrantz-Theil) (2018)

Political offices
Preceded by Tommy Ahlers	Minister of Higher Education and Science; 2019–2021	Succeeded by Jesper Petersen
Preceded by Joy Mogensen	Minister for Culture; 2021 –	Succeeded by Incumbent
Preceded by Joy Mogensen	Ministers for Ecclesiastical Affairs; 2021 –	Succeeded by Incumbent
