= Maria Reumert Gjerding =

Danish politician (born 1978)

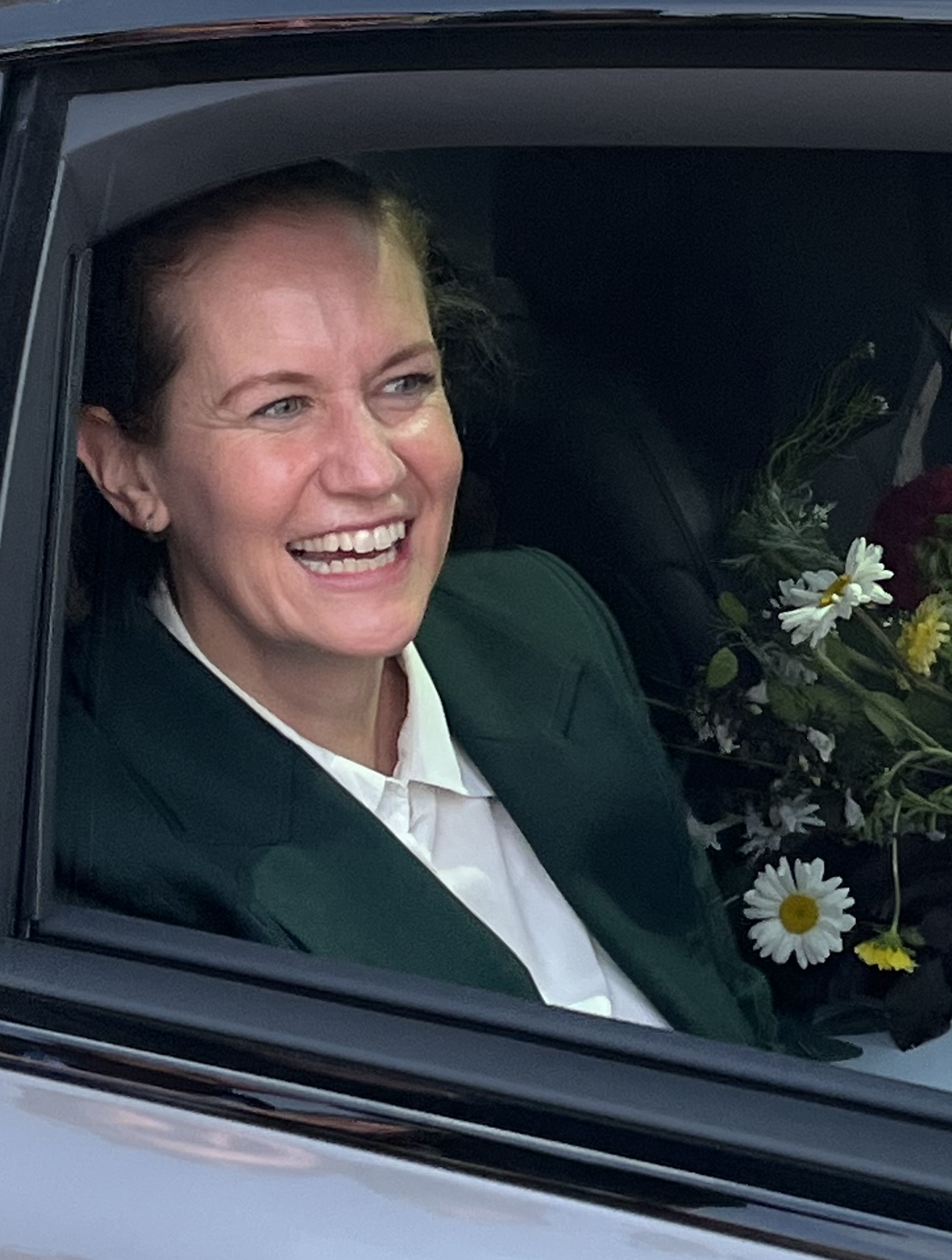

Minister for the Environment
- Incumbent
- Assumed office 3 June 2026
- Prime Minister: Mette Frederiksen
- Preceded by: Magnus Heunicke

President of Danish Society for Nature Conservation
- In office 7 April 2018 – 3 June 2026
- Preceded by: Ella Maria Bisschop-Larsen
- Succeeded by: TBD

Member of the Folketing
- In office 18 June 2015 – 7 April 2018

Personal details
- Born: 3 August 1978 (age 48) Copenhagen, Denmark
- Party: SF (since 2026)
- Other political affiliations: EL (2008–2026)
- Education: Roskilde University

Maria Reumert Gjerding (born 3 August 1978) is a Danish politician. She was a member of the Folketing for the Red-Green Alliance political party from 2015 to 2018. She was president of the Danish Society for Nature Conservation from 2018 to June 2026. She took the seat as Minister for the Environment on 3 June 2026 representing SF.

== Political career ==
Gjerding was elected into the parliament of Denmark at the 2015 election where she received 2,287 votes. On 8 April 2018 she resigned her seat, after having been chosen as president of the Danish Society for Nature Conservation. Her seat in parliament was taken over by Øjvind Vilsholm.
