= Morten Løkkegaard =

Danish politician (born 1964)

Morten Løkkegaard MEP
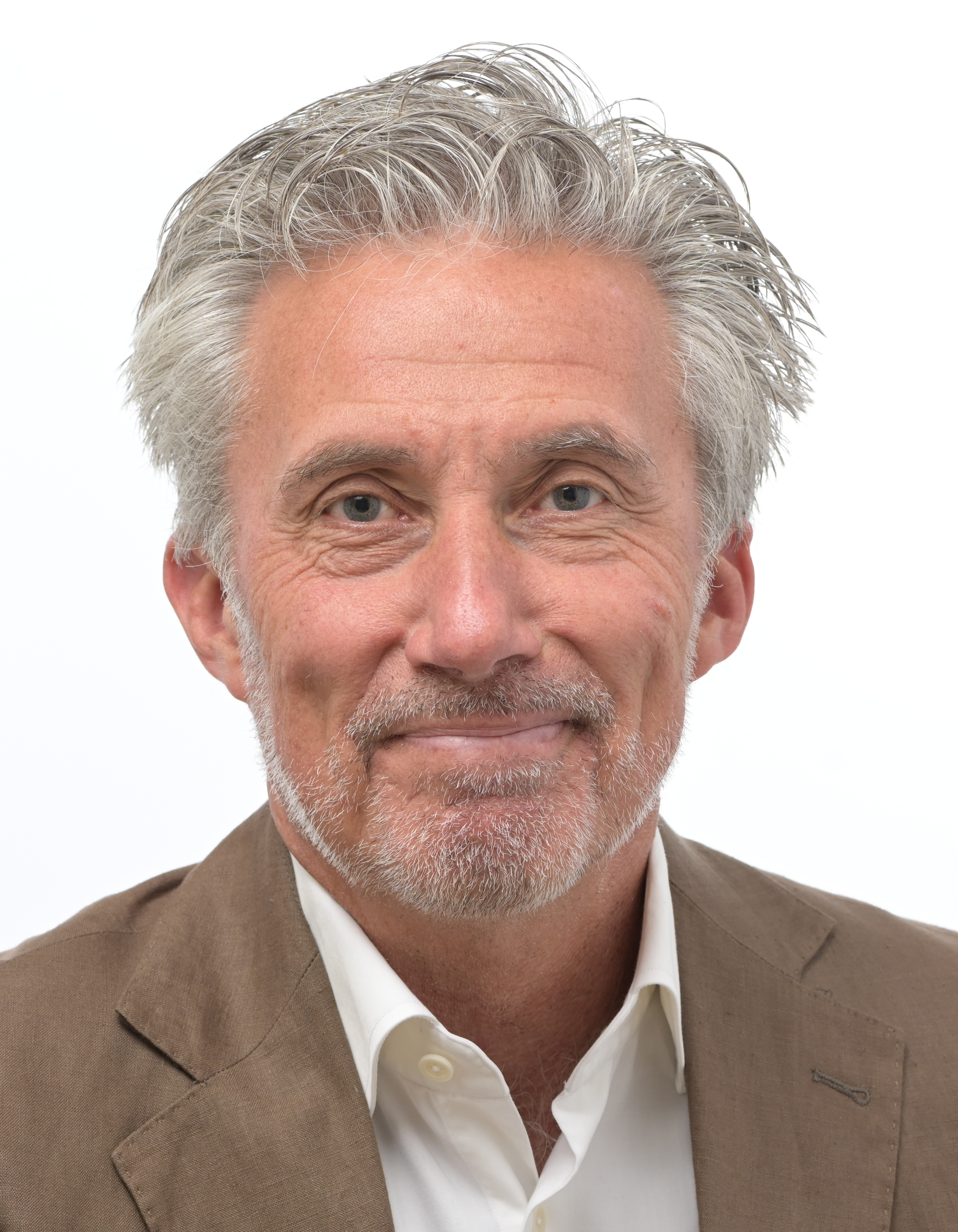
- Official portrait, 2024

Member of the European Parliament
- In office 2009–2014
- Incumbent
- Assumed office 2016
- Constituency: Denmark

Personal details
- Born: 20 December 1964 (age 61) Helsingør, Denmark
- Party: Danish: Venstre; EU: Alliance of Liberals and Democrats for Europe
- Spouse(s): Paula Larrain (div.); Connie Dahl Løkkegaard
- Website: https://loekkegaardiep.dk/

Morten Løkkegaard (born 20 December 1964) is a Danish politician who has served as a Member of the European Parliament (MEP) and the Danish Parliament intermittently since 2009. He has held his current position as a member of the European Parliament since 2016. He represents the Venstre political party and is affiliated with the Alliance of Liberals and Democrats for Europe.

== Early life and education ==
Løkkegaard was born on 20 December 1964 in Helsingør, Denmark. He graduated from Nørre Gymnasium in 1983 and from the Danish School of Journalism (da:Journalisthøjskolen; since 2008, the Danish School of Media and Journalism) in 1988. He was then a writer for Jyllands-Posten from 1988 to 1990.

== Early career ==
From 1990 until 2005, Løkkegaard worked for the Danish Broadcasting Corporation where he hosted political and entertainment television programs. In 1995, he was a German Marshall Fellow studying politics in the United States. In 2005, he founded an independent communications consultancy where he acted as a consultant, lecturer, and moderator.

== Political career ==
Løkkegaard was first elected to the European Parliament in 2009 and represented Denmark as a member of the Danish Liberal party, Venstre, and the Alliance of Liberals and Democrats for Europe. He was a rapporteur and the deputy chairman of the Danish delegation to the Nordic Council and to the Parliamentary Assembly of the Mediterranean. In 2014, his party lost seats at the EU and he lost his re-election. After losing his seat at the European Parliament, Løkkegaard became a candidate for the Danish Parliament in the Ballerup and Glostrup constituencies. He was elected in 2015, and represented Copenhagen as a member of Venstre, a seat which he held until March 2016.

In 2016, Løkkegaard was re-elected to the European Parliament, replacing Ulla Tornaes. He served as Vice Chair of the Committee on Culture and Education during his first term. He later served on the Committee on Employment and Social Affairs (2016–2017) and the Committee on the Internal Market and Consumer Protection (2016–2019). In this capacity, he was the Parliament's rapporteur on the European Accessibility Act in 2019.

In addition to his committee assignments, Løkkegaard was also a member of the Parliament's delegation with relations to South Africa and a substitute member of the delegation with relations to the United States. In 2018, he was his party's nomination for Spitzenkandidat.

Løkkegaard was re-elected to the European Parliament in 2019. He has since been serving as one of eight vice chairs of the Renew Europe group, under the leadership of chairman Dacian Cioloș. He also joined the Committee on the Internal Market and Consumer Protection (since 2019) and the Special Committee on Foreign Interference in all Democratic Processes in the European Union (since 2020). Since 2021, he has been part of the Parliament's delegation to the Conference on the Future of Europe.

In addition to his committee assignments, Løkkegaard is part of the Parliament's delegation for relations with Australia and New Zealand.

Løkkegaard is highly involved with issues related to communication on and about the EU, and to the creation of an actual European public sphere. He also works on issues related to jobs and growth creation–notably through a completion of the Single Market and through advocating the negotiation of large free trade agreements with our major trading partners (such as the BRICS and the U.S). His main political focus evolves around his practical experience and background, since he has more than 20 years of experience with in the Danish press as a journalist and anchorman on national TV in Denmark.

== Personal life ==
Løkkegaard was previously married to Paula Larrain, with whom he has a son, though they have since divorced. He is married to Connie Dahl Løkkegaard, and the couple have several children together.
