= Nikolaj Villumsen =

Danish politician (born 1983)

Nikolaj Villumsen MEP
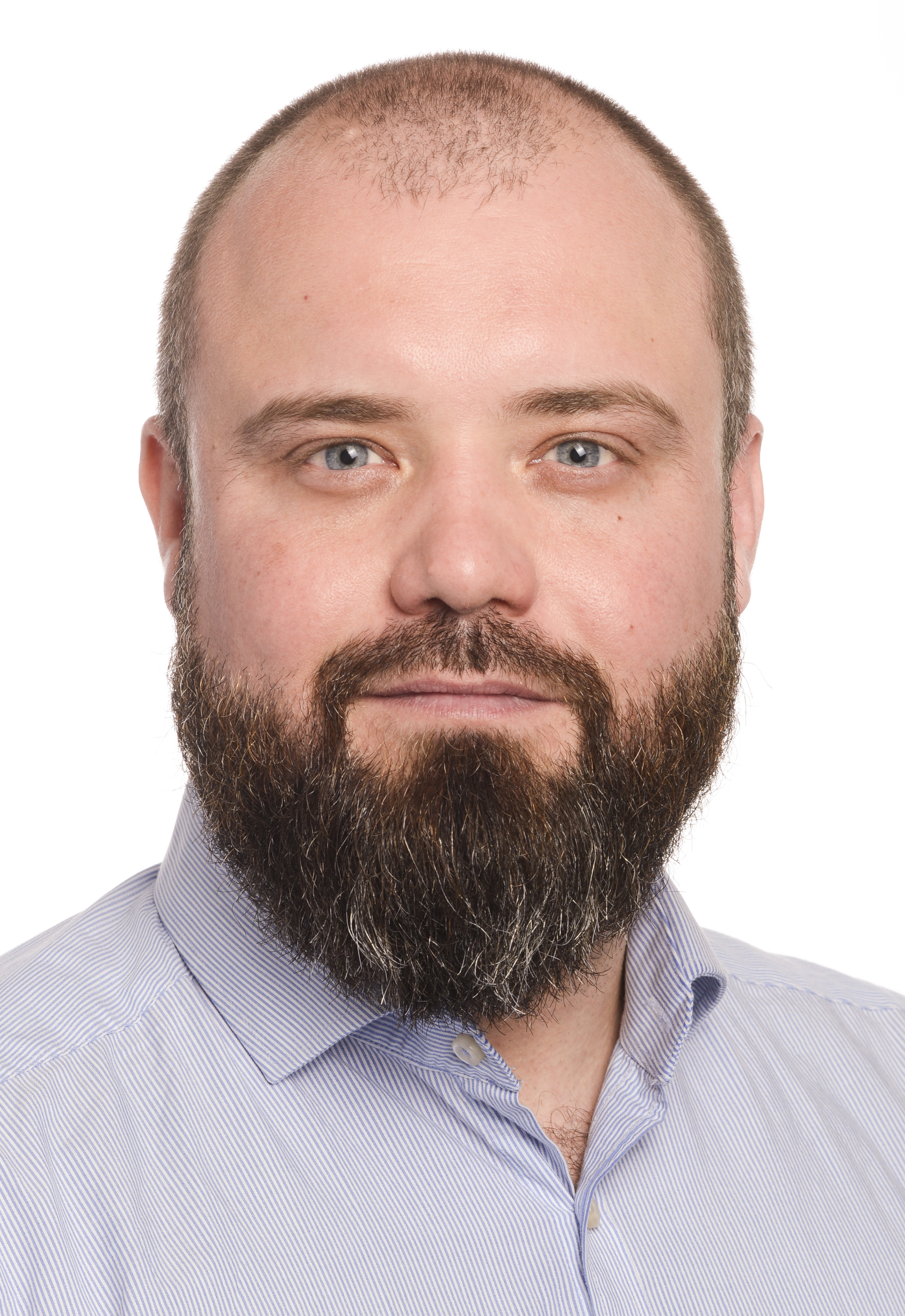

Member of the European Parliament for Denmark
- Incumbent
- Assumed office 2 July 2019

Personal details
- Born: 28 February 1983 (age 43) Aarhus, Denmark

Nikolaj Barslund Villumsen (born 28 February 1983) is a Danish politician who was elected as a Member of the European Parliament in 2019, representing Enhedslisten, a part of The Left group, where he serves as one of the four vice-chairs. Besides serving as vice-chair in The Left, Villumsen is a member of the Committee of Employment and Social Affairs, Committee on the Environment, Public Health and Food Safety and the Committee of Constitutional Affairs.

He was a member of the Folketing from September 2011 to June 2019, representing Enhedslisten.

For his many years of solidarity and support for Palestine and the Palestinian people, he received in August 2019 a Certificate of Appreciation from the former Palestanian Ambassador in Denmark, Mufeed Shami.

He has a bachelor's degree in history.
