= Torsten Schack Pedersen =

Danish politician

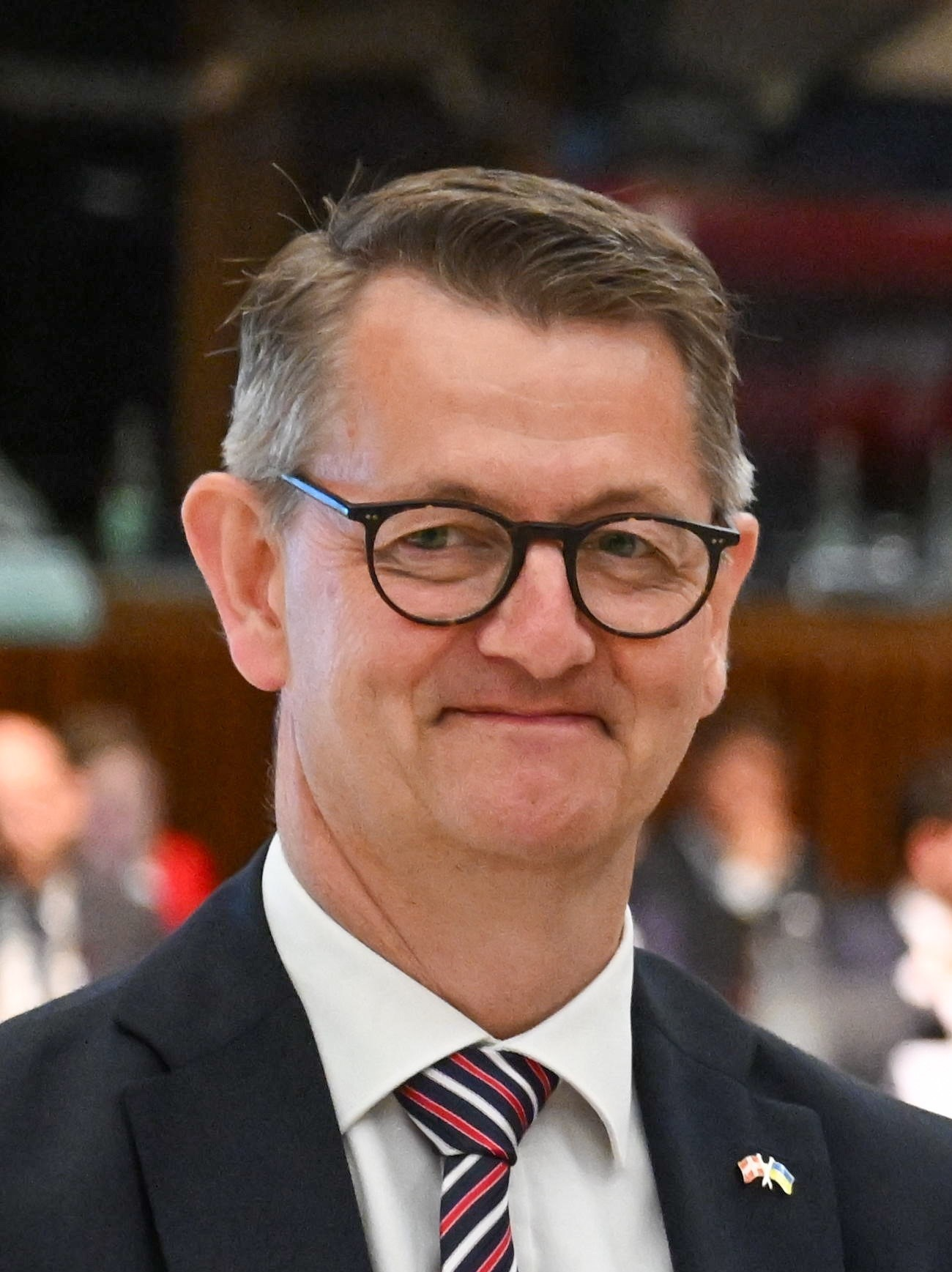
- Schack Pedersen in 2025

Minister of Societal Resilience and Contingency
- In office 29 August 2024 – 3 June 2026
- Prime Minister: Mette Frederiksen
- Preceded by: Position established
- Succeeded by: Lisbeth Bech-Nielsen

Member of the Folketing
- In office 8 February 2005 – 25 March 2026
- Constituency: North Jutland (2007–2026); Viborg (2005–2007)

Personal details
- Born: 26 June 1976 (age 50) Farsø, Denmark
- Party: Venstre
- Spouse: Louise Elholm (m. 2005)
- Children: 2
- Education: Copenhagen University

Torsten Schack Pedersen (born 26 June 1976) is a Danish politician, who was a member of the Folketing for the Venstre political party. He was elected into parliament at the 2005 Danish general election.

== Political career ==
=== Youth politics ===
Pedersen served as Chairman of Venstre's youth wing, Venstres Ungdom, between 2001 and 2003.

=== Parliament ===
He was elected into parliament at the 2005 election, and was reelected in 2007, 2011, 2015, 2019, and 2022. He, along with his wife, failed to get re-elected in the 2026 election.

In March 2023, he became the Commissioner of the Home Guard. He stepped down from the position in January 2024 to focus on his new leadership role in Parliament.

=== Minister of National Safety and Emergency Management ===
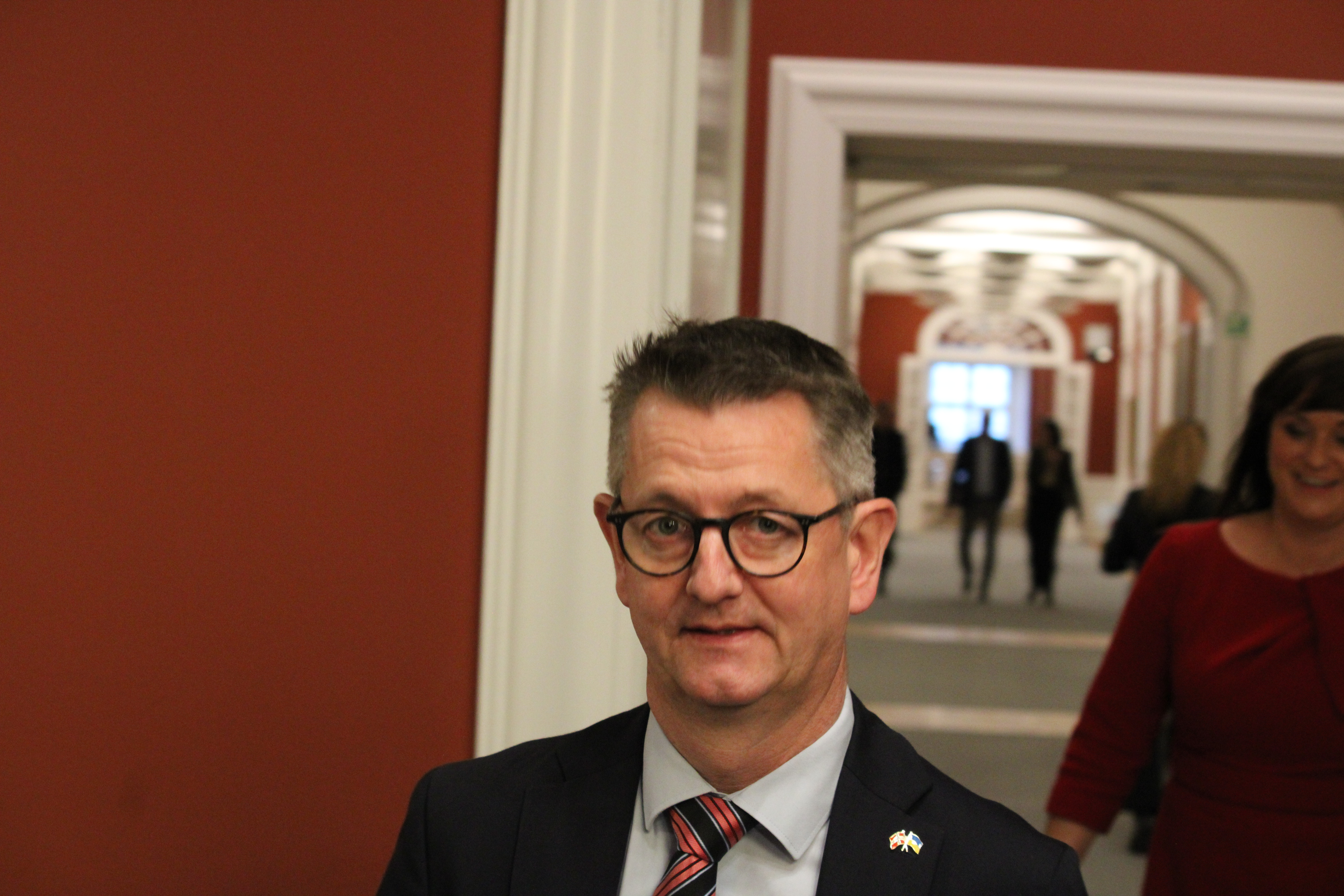
Schack Pedersen at Christiansborg, December 2025

Pedersen was appointed minister of societal resilience and contingency in a cabinet reshuffle on 29 August 2024.

In January 2025, he struck a deal with the government parties and seven opposition parties to strengthen civil protection with additional resources, improve emergency coordination, and develop a new national cybersecurity strategy.

== Personal life ==
Pedersen is married to fellow Venstre politician Louise Elholm. The couple has two children.
