= Annette Lind =

Danish politician (born 1969)

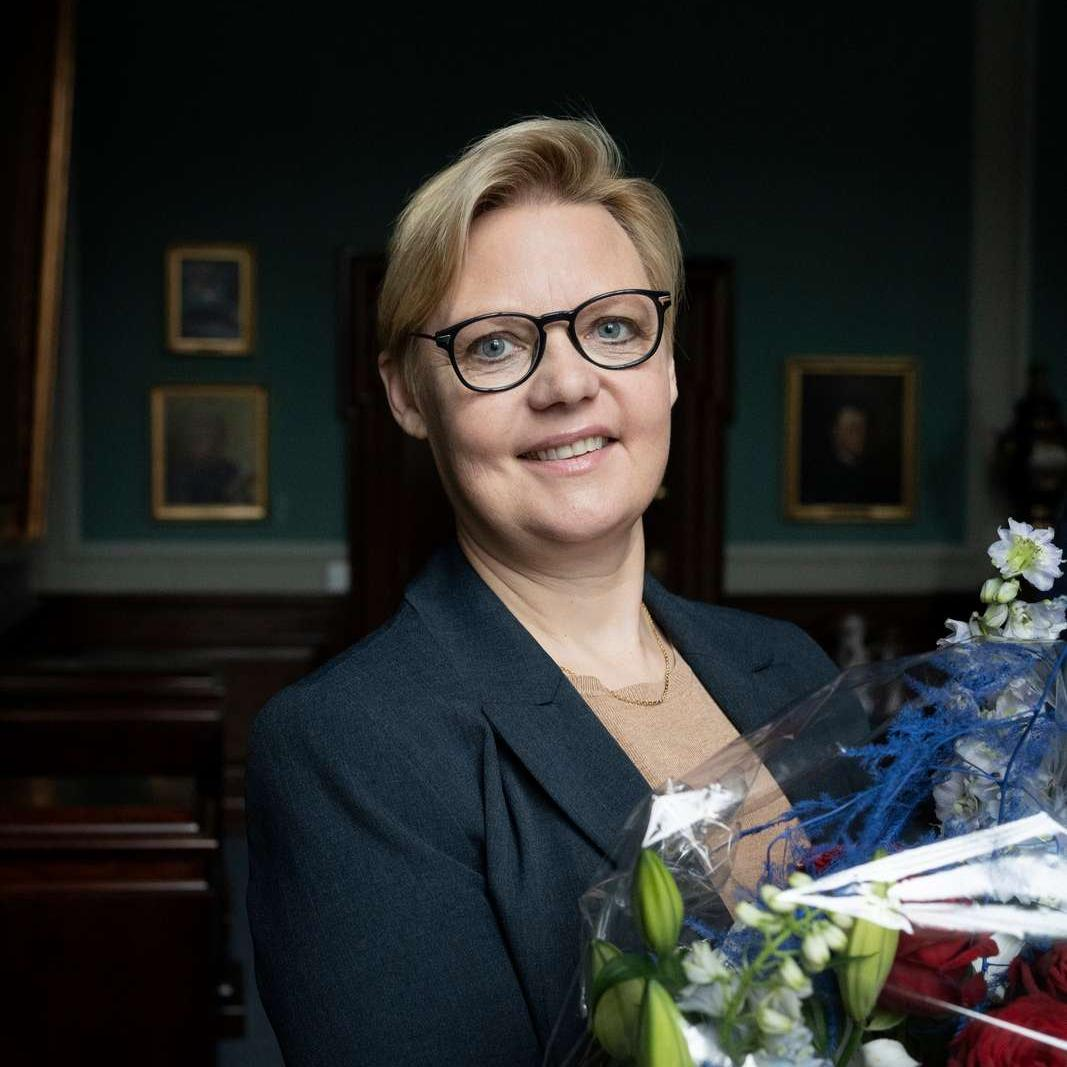

Member of the Folketing
- In office 15 September 2011 – 29 February 2024
- Succeeded by: Karin Gaardsted
- Constituency: West Jutland

Personal details
- Born: 2 June 1969 (age 56) Spøttrup, Denmark
- Party: Social Democrats

Annette Harbo Lind (born 2 June 1969) is a Danish politician who was a member of the Folketing for the Social Democrats from 2011 to 2024. She was elected at the 2011 Danish general election. She was a member of the municipal council of Holstebro Municipality from 2010 to 2011.

In 2024, she became consul general in Flensburg representing the Danish minority in Northern Germany.
