= Leif Mikkelsen =

Danish handball coach (born 1984)

Leif Mikkelsen (born 2 October 1948) is a Danish handball coach, who was the head coach of the Denmark men's national handball team from 1977 to 1987. His team has been descriped as the first modern Danish handball team.

== Career ==
=== Coach of Danish national team ===
He became the head coach for the Danish national team at the age of only 27. His first major international tournament was the 1978 World Championship in Denmark, where Denmark finished 4th. He then lead Denmark to two additional fourth-place finishes at the 1978 World Championship and at the 1984 Olympics.

He was inspired by the Yugoslavian handball coaching and especially the coach Vlado Stenzel.

He was also the interim coach for the Danish national team from 1999 to 2000, after Keld Nielsen was fired following the 1999 World Men's Handball Championship. He was replaced by Torben Winther. Later he coached IF Ajax.

=== Other posts ===
After his handball tenure he has worked with HR in DFDS and Hydro Texaco.

In 2004 he became the director for Team Copenhagen. He was in this position for the next 18 years.
