= Louise Schack Elholm =

Danish politician (born 1977)

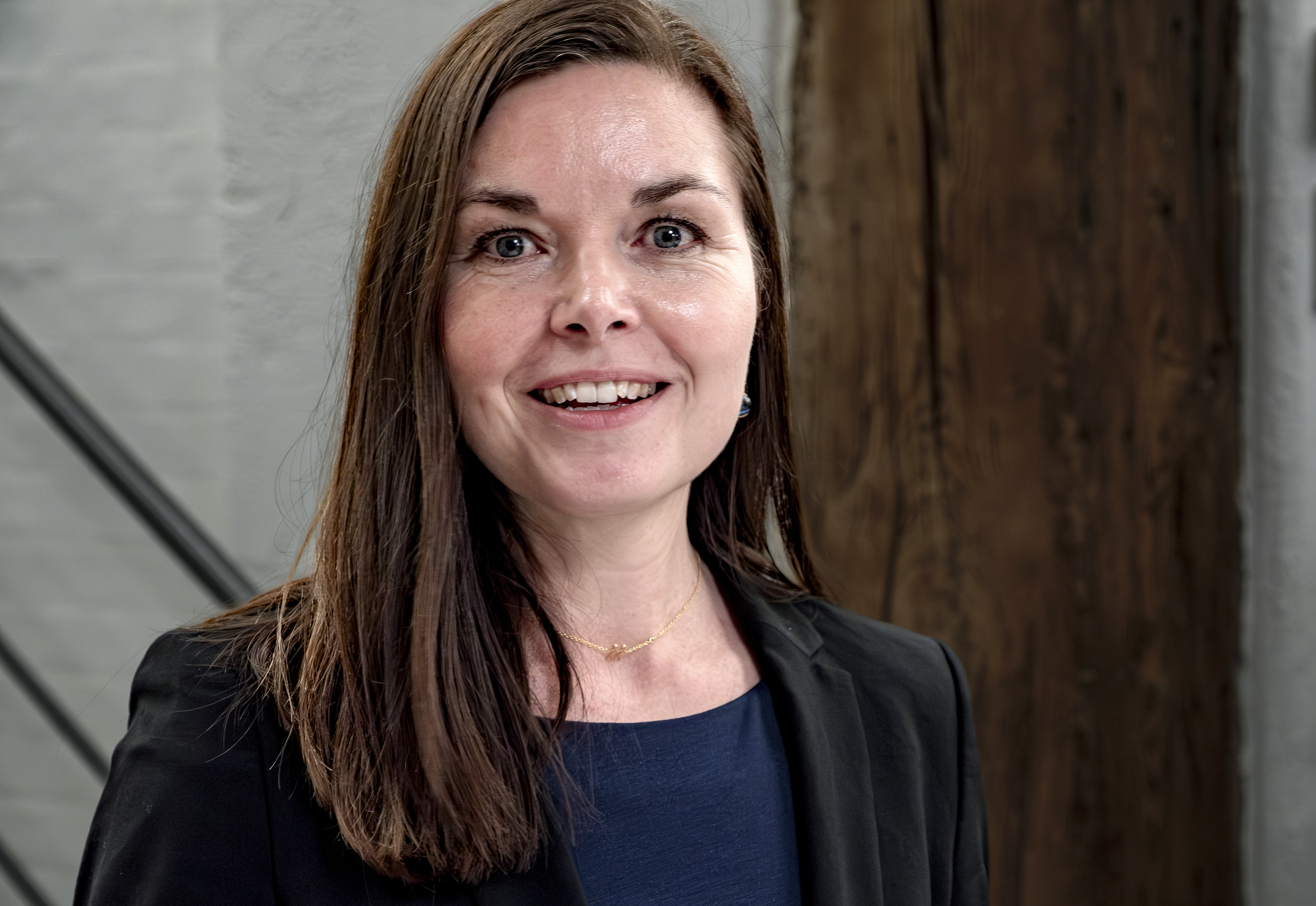
- Schack Elholm in 2023

Minister of Ecclesiastical Affairs
- In office 15 December 2022 – 23 November 2023
- Prime Minister: Mette Frederiksen
- Preceded by: Ane Halsboe-Jørgensen
- Succeeded by: Morten Dahlin

Member of the Folketing
- In office 13 November 2007 – 25 March 2026
- Constituency: Zealand

Personal details
- Born: 26 October 1977 (age 48) Slagelse, Denmark
- Party: Venstre
- Spouse: Torsten Schack Pedersen (m. 2005)

Louise Schack Elholm (born 26 October 1977) is a Danish politician who served as a member of the Folketing for the Venstre political party. She was elected into parliament at the 2007 Danish general election. She also served as minister of ecclesiastical affairs between 2022 and 2023.

== Political career ==
Elholm was first elected into the Folketing in the 2007 general election. She was reelected in 2011 with 5,379 votes cast for her. In the 2015 election she was elected with 3,185 votes and in 2019 with 4,229 votes. Elholm, along with her husband, failed to get re-elected in the 2026 election.

From 15 December 2022 to 23 November 2023, Elholm was appointed minister of ecclesiastical affairs in Mette Frederiksen's second cabinet.

== Personal life ==
Elholm is married to fellow Venstre politician Torsten Schack Pedersen. The couple has two children.
