= Jesper Petersen (politician) =

Danish politician (born 1981)

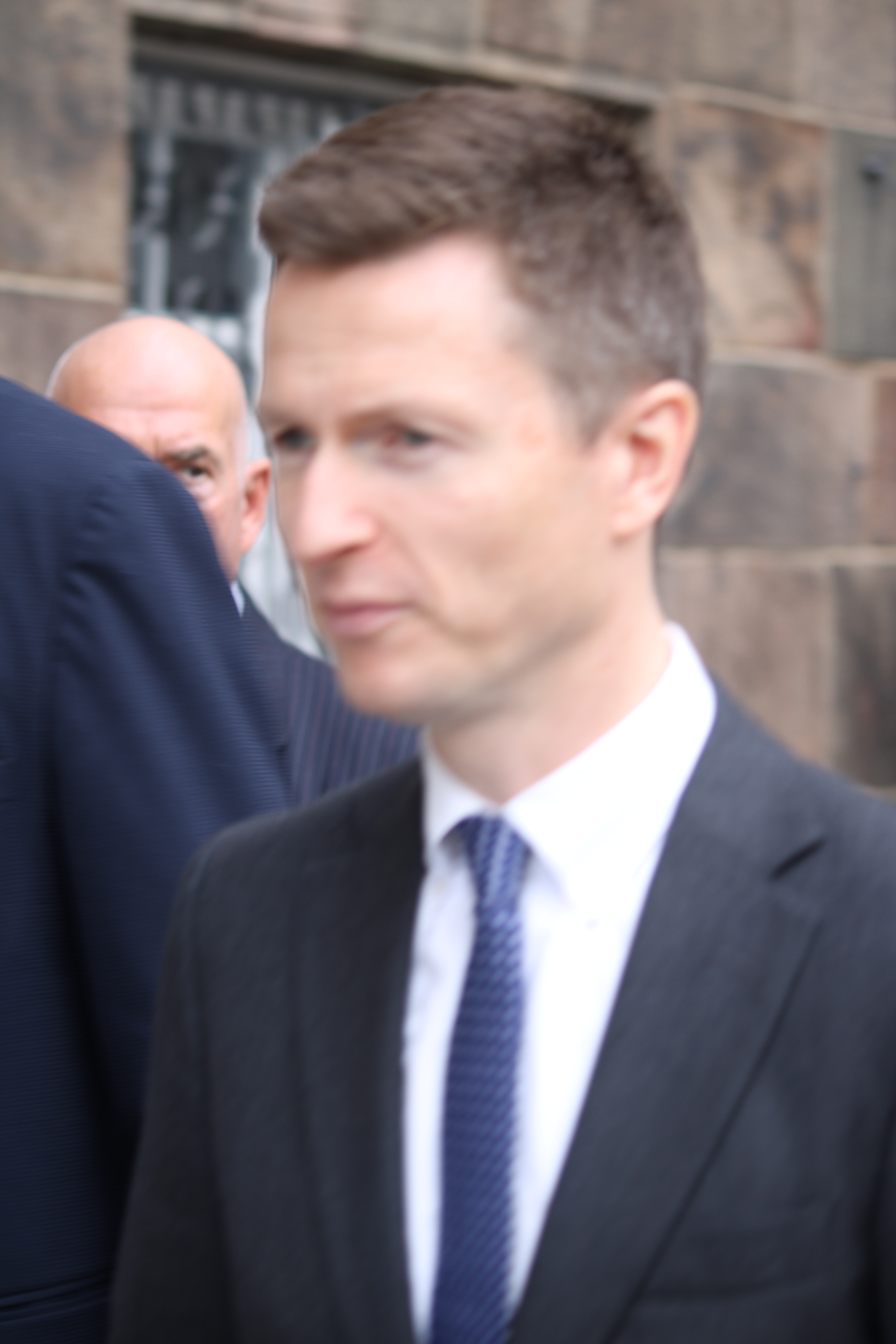
- Petersen in 2025

Minister of Higher Education and Science
- In office 16 August 2021 – 15 December 2022
- Prime Minister: Mette Frederiksen
- Preceded by: Ane Halsboe-Jørgensen
- Succeeded by: Christina Egelund

Member of the Folketing
- Incumbent
- Assumed office 13 November 2007
- Constituency: South Jutland

Personal details
- Born: 25 August 1981 (age 44) Haderslev, Denmark
- Party: Social Democrats; Socialist People's Party (until 2013)

Jesper Petersen (born 25 August 1981) is a Danish politician, who is a member of the Folketing for the Social Democrats political party. He was Minister of Higher Education and Science. He was elected into parliament at the 2007 Danish general election, as a member of the Socialist People's Party. He switched party to the Social Democrats in 2013.

== Political career ==
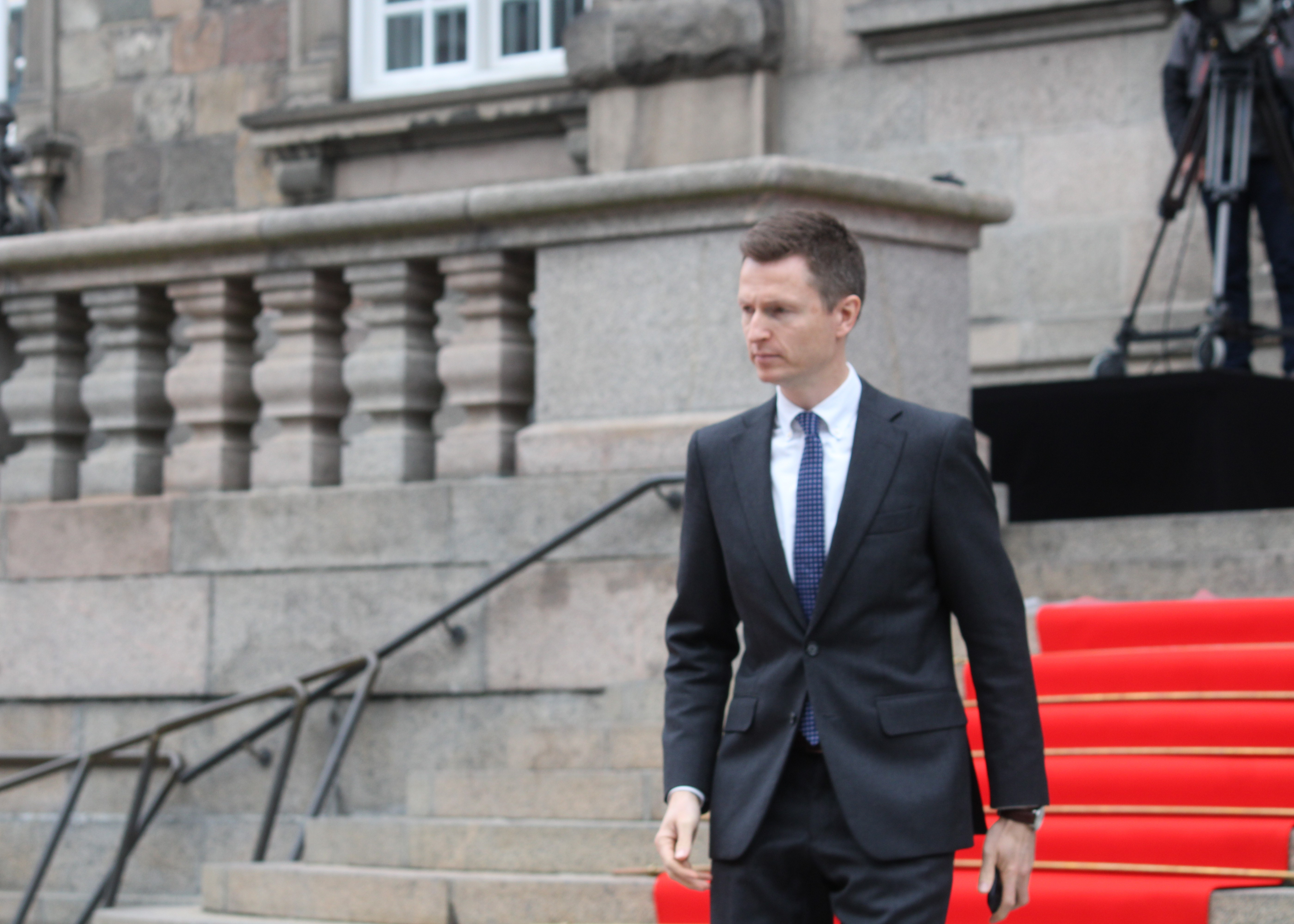
Petersen at the 2025 opening of parliament

Petersen was first elected into parliament at the 2007 election, where he was a member of the Socialist People's Party. He was reelected in 2011, but during the term he switched party to the Social Democrats. The switch happened on 21 March 2013. He was reelected as a member of his new party in 2015 and 2019. On 16 August he became the Minister of Higher Education and Science after a minor cabinet shuffle in the Frederiksen Cabinet.

Political offices
Preceded by Ane Halsboe-Jørgensen	Minister of Higher Education and Science; 2021–	Succeeded by Incumbent
