= Karin Gaardsted =

Danish politician

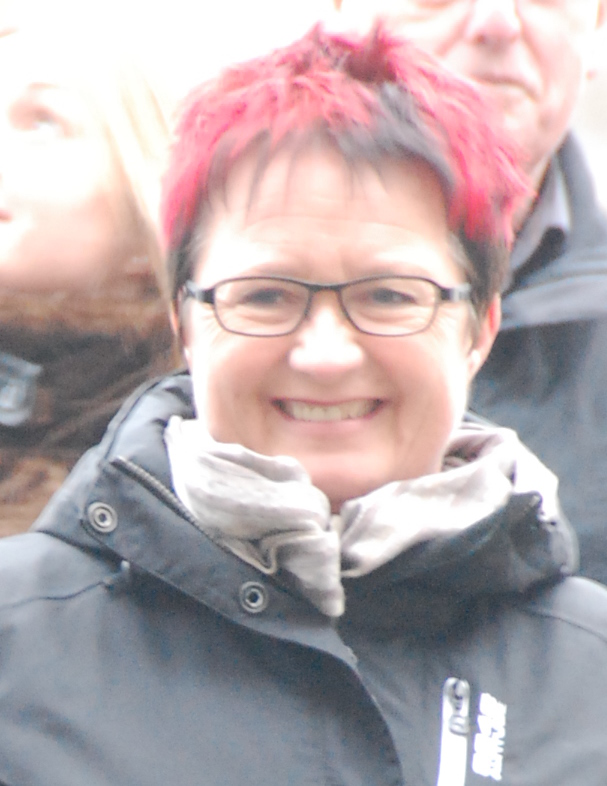

Member of the Folketing
- Incumbent
- Assumed office 1 March 2024
- Preceded by: Annette Lind
- Constituency: West Jutland
- In office 15 September 2011 – 5 June 2019
- Constituency: West Jutland

Deputy Mayor of Viborg Municipality
- In office 1 January 2010 – 12 October 2011
- Mayor: Søren Pape Poulsen
- Preceded by: Ib Bjerregaard
- Succeeded by: Per Møller Jensen

Personal details
- Born: Karin Rasmussen; 19 October 1955 (age 70) Ørre, Jutland, Denmark
- Party: Social Democrats
- Children: 1

Karin Gaardsted (born 19 October 1955) is a Danish politician. She was a member of the Folketing for the Social Democratic Party. She was elected into parliament at the 2011 Danish general election and then reelected again in the 2015 Danish general election. She was then temporary member of the Folketing for the Social Democratic Party in Western Jutland greater constituency as substitute for Anne Paulin in 2021. She entered Parliament again on 1 March 2024 when Annette Lind resigned her mandate to become consul general in Flensburg. From 1 January 2010 until her entry into the Folketing in 2011, she was deputy mayor of Viborg Municipality.

== Early life ==
Karin Gaardsted was born October 19, 1955, in Ørre Parish, Herning, the daughter of farmer Børge Gaardsted Rasmussen and Anna Rasmussen. She is the mother of Nana Cecilie Gaardsted Bøvling, born in 1991. She trained as a schoolteacher at Herning Teacher Training College, from 1975 to 1979. She was a primary school teacher, Houlkær School in 1990.

== Political career ==
Karin Gaardsted was elected to the municipal board in Viborg Municipality (Viborg Combination Committee) at the election 15 November 2005. She got 228 personal votes. This was the first time she was elected to a political post.

At the municipal elections in 2009, she had replaced the incumbent mayor Johannes Stensgaard as the Social Democrats' mayoral candidate. She got the election's biggest personal vote with 6561, against Ib Bjerregaard's (V) 5050 votes and Søren Pape Poulsen's (C) 3244 personal votes. There were a total of 47,772 votes counted. After a constitution agreement between Social Democracy, SF, Danish People's Party and Conservative People's Party, the conservative Søren Pape mayor and Karin Gaardsted deputy mayor for Viborg Municipality. In addition, Karin Gaardsted became chairman of the municipality's largest committee area, the Children and Youth Committee.

=== Folketing ===
In May 2010, she was elected as a parliamentary candidate for the Social Democrats in the Viborg Vestkredsen, replacing member of the Parliament, Jens Christian Lund. At the 2011 Danish general election, she was elected to the Danish Parliament for the Social Democrats.

In the Danish Parliament, in 2011 she became chairman of the Business, Growth and Export Committee. In the same year, she also became deputy chairman of the Nordic Council.

On 13 August 2013, she was appointed as IT- and telecoms rapporteur and innovation rapporteur for the Social Democrats, an area that she didn't have much insight into. In one of her first interviews after the appointment, she spoke positively about Denmark joining the EU's patent court.

In June 2015, she was re-elected as a member of parliament for the Social Democrats in the Viborg West constituency. Since the 2015 election, Karin has held the following positions in the Folketing, rapporteur for the IT and Telecom area, rapporteur for the consumer area, rapporteur for Greenland and rapporteur for the Faroe Islands. In 2019, she was not elected.

She entered Parliament again on 1 March 2024 when Annette Lind resigned her mandate to become consul general in Flensburg.
