= Zenia Stampe =

Danish politician (born 1979)

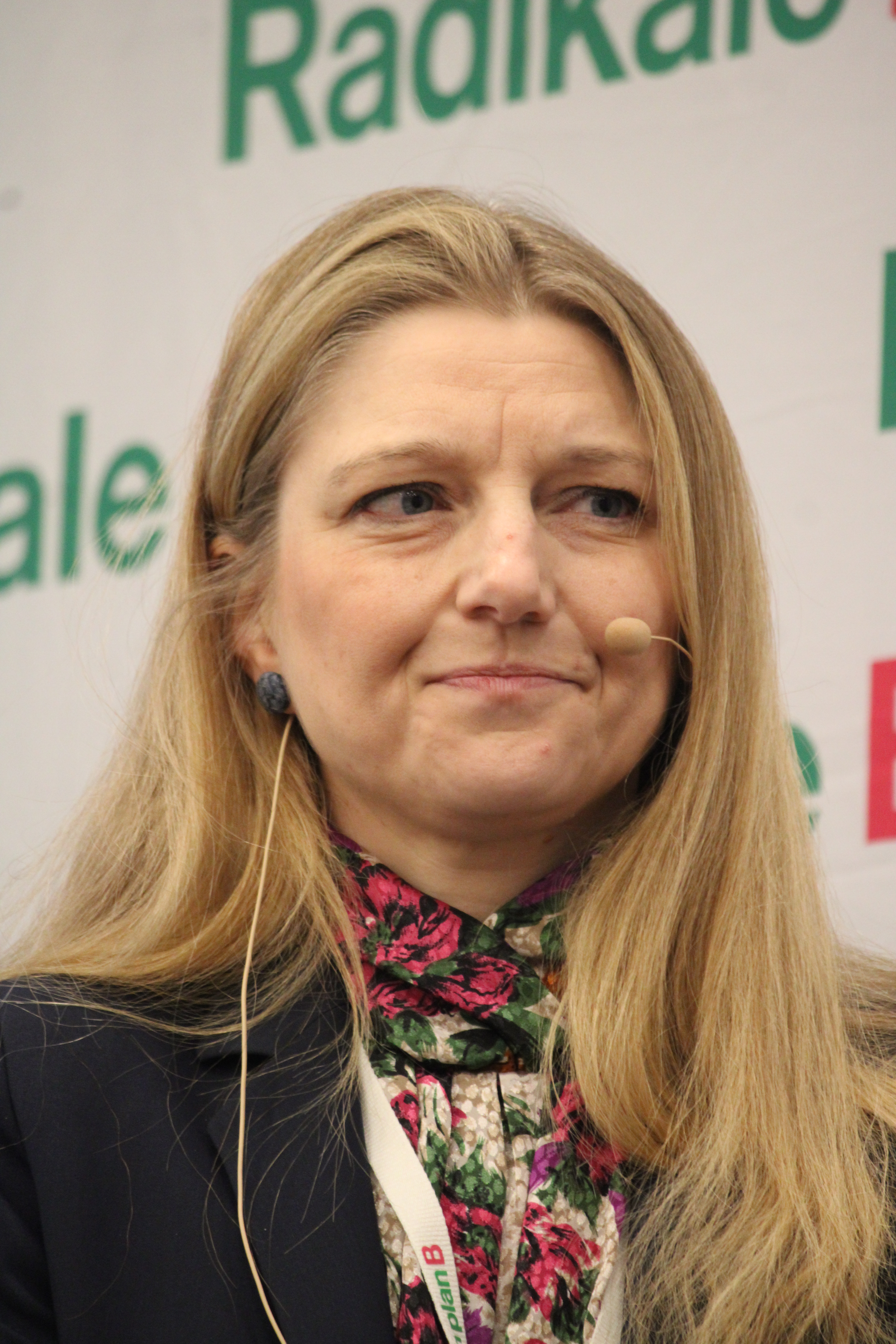
- Stampe in 2026

Minister for Culture
- Incumbent
- Assumed office 3 June 2026
- Prime Minister: Mette Frederiksen
- Preceded by: Jakob Engel-Schmidt

Member of the Folketing
- Incumbent
- Assumed office 15 September 2011
- Constituency: Zealand

Personal details
- Born: 30 March 1979 (age 47) Roskilde, Denmark
- Party: Social Liberal Party

Zenia Stampe Lyngbo (born 30 March 1979) is a Danish politician who is a member of the Folketing for the Social Liberal Party. She was elected into parliament at the 2011 Danish general election.

== Background ==
Stampe graduated from Copenhagen University with an MSc in political science in 2008. She worked in the Danish Business Authority (Danish: erhvervs- og bygge styrelsen) from 2010 to 2011, before being elected to represent the Zealand constituency. Her policy positions include effective climate action, strong criticism of tough immigration policies, and pro European and international co-operation. She has blogged for the Danish newspaper Politiken, and has been the target of abusive comments on social media.

== Political career ==
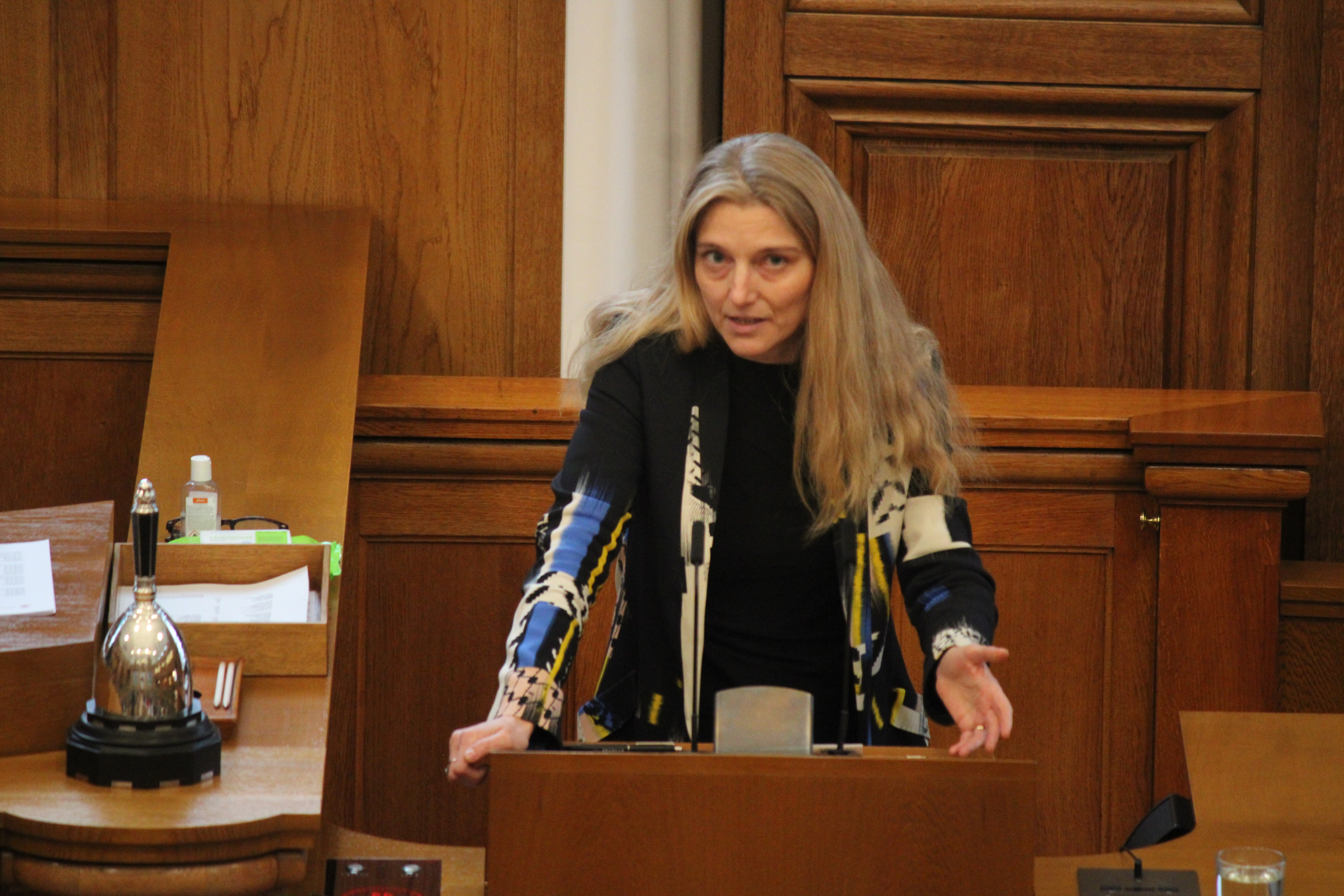
Stampe speaking in the Folketing at Christiansborg, 22 October 2025

Stampe was first elected to parliament in the 2011 election, and was reelected in 2015, 2019, and 2022.
