= Andreas Steenberg =

Danish politician

Member of the Folketing
- In office 15 September 2011 – 1 November 2022
- Constituency: West Jutland

Personal details
- Born: 22 July 1983 (age 42) Randers, Denmark
- Party: Social Liberal Party

Andreas Raaby Steenberg (born 22 July 1983 in Randers) is a Danish politician, who was a member of the Folketing for the Social Liberal Party. He was elected into parliament at the 2011 Danish general election, and lost his seat in 2022.

== Political career ==
Steenberg was elected into parliament at the 2011 election, where he received 2,341 personal votes. In 2015 he was reelected with 1,971 votes. He was reelected again in 2019 with 4,444 votes. In the 2022 Danish general election, where the Social Liberal Party lost more than half of their seats, Steenberg was not re-elected, losing out to party fellow Katrine Robsøe.
