= Liselott Blixt =

Swedish-Danish politician (born 1965)

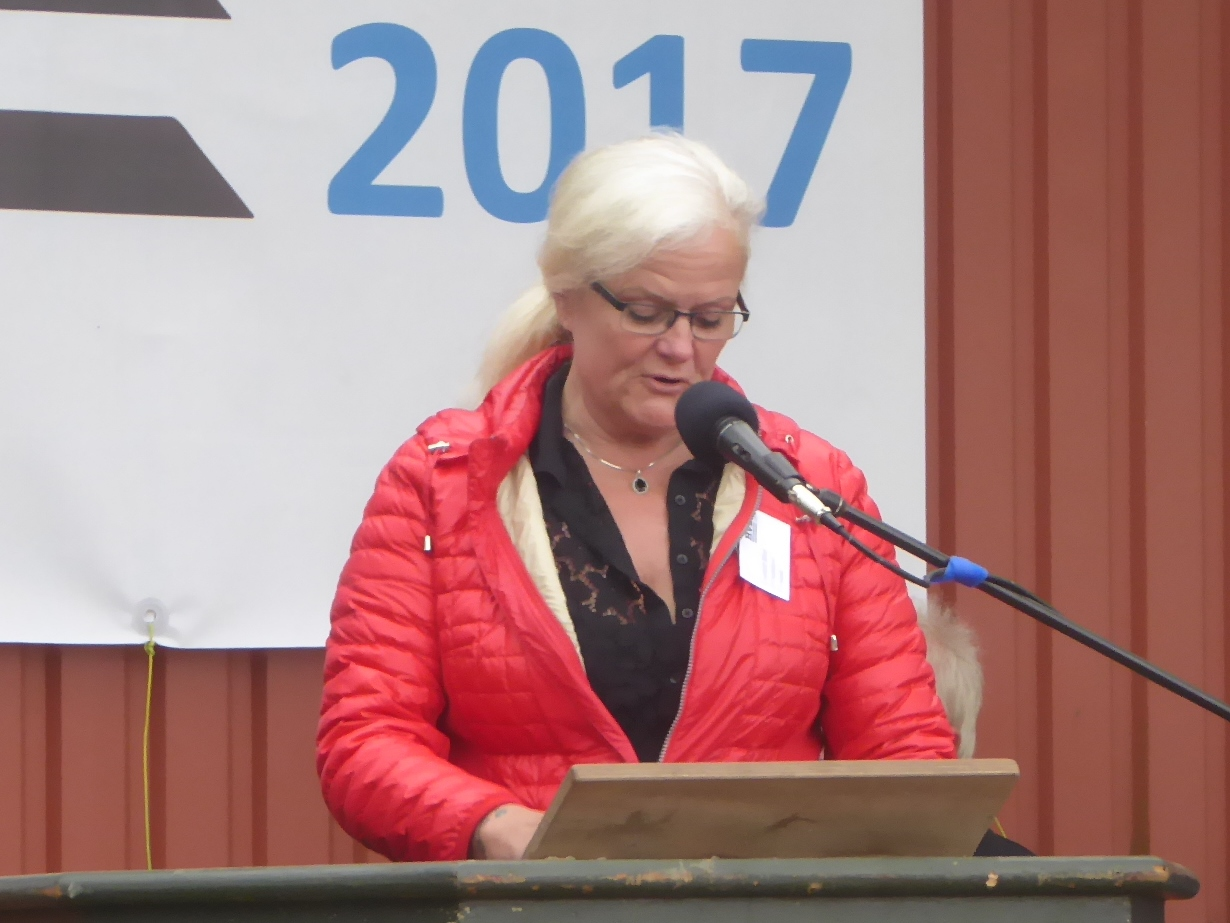
- Blixt in 2017

Member of the Folketing
- Incumbent
- Assumed office 13 November 2007 - 1 November 2022
- Constituency: Zealand

Personal details
- Born: 22 February 1965 (age 61) Lund, Sweden
- Party: Danish People's Party (until 2022)

Liselott Blixt (born 22 February 1965 in Lund) is a Swedish-Danish politician, who is a member of the Folketing for the Danish People's Party. She was elected into the Folketing in the 2007 Danish general election.

== Political career ==
Blixt has been a part of the municipal council of Greve Municipality since the 2001 Danish local elections. Since 2014 she has also been the deputy mayor of the municipality.

Blixt first ran for parliament in the 2007 election, and was elected with just 959 personal votes cast for her. She was reelected in 2011 with 1,306 votes, in 2015 with 5,981 votes and in 2019 with 2,427 votes.
