= Stine Brix =

Danish author and politician

Member of the Folketing
- In office 15 September 2011 – 5 June 2019
- Constituency: North Jutland

Personal details
- Born: 3 April 1982 (age 44) Glostrup, Denmark
- Party: Red–Green Alliance

Stine Maiken Brix (born 3 April 1982 in Glostrup) is a Danish politician, who was a member of the Folketing for the Red–Green Alliance from 2011 to 2019.

== Political career ==
Brix was first elected into parliament at the 2011 Danish general election, where she received 2,667. She was reelected in 2015 with 5.762 votes. She did not run in the 2019 election.
