= Karen Ellemann =

Danish politician (born 1969)

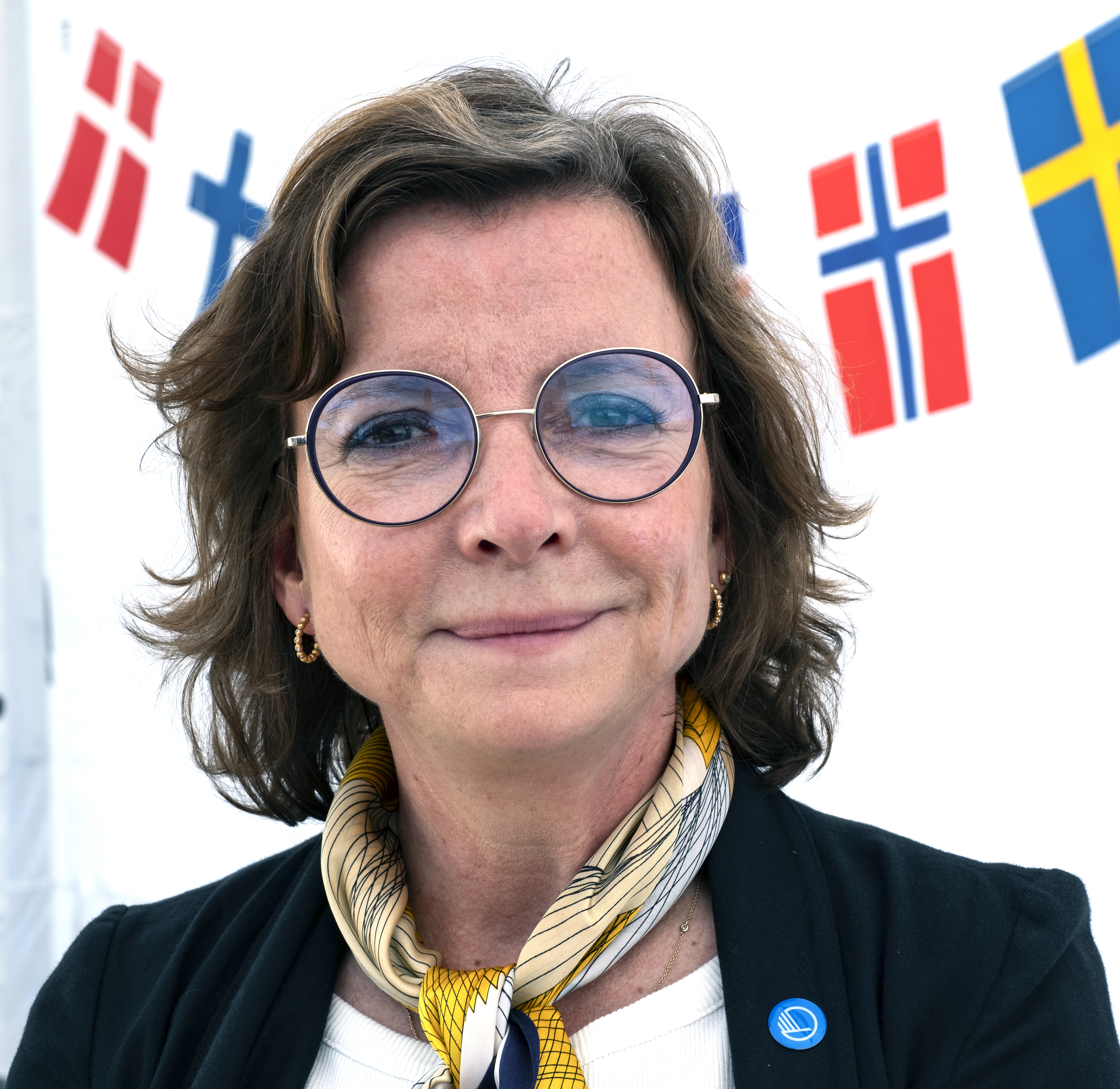

Secretary General of the Nordic Council of Ministers
- Incumbent
- Assumed office 1 January 2023
- Preceded by: Paula Lehtomäki

Member of the Folketing
- In office 13 November 2007 – 1 November 2022
- Constituency: Greater Copenhagen

Minister of Gender Equality and Nordic Cooperation Fisheries from 2017
- In office 28 November 2016 – 2 May 2018
- Prime Minister: Lars Løkke Rasmussen

Minister of Interior and Social Affairs
- In office 28 June 2015 – 28 November 2016
- Prime Minister: Lars Løkke Rasmussen

Minister of Environment and Nordic Cooperation
- In office 23 February 2010 – 3 October 2011
- Prime Minister: Lars Løkke Rasmussen

Minister of Interior and Social Affairs
- In office 7 April 2009 – 23 February 2010
- Prime Minister: Lars Løkke Rasmussen

Personal details
- Born: 26 August 1969 (age 56) Charlottenlund, Denmark
- Party: Venstre
- Spouses: Aren Boje Kharabian (divorced) Kresten Kloch (m. 2011)
- Children: 2
- Parent: Uffe Ellemann-Jensen (father)
- Relatives: Jakob Ellemann-Jensen (brother)

Karen Ellemann Kloch, formerly Karen Ellemann Karabian, (born 26 August 1969) is a Danish politician, who serves as the current Secretary General of the Nordic Council of Ministers. She was previously a member of the Folketing for the Venstre political party. She is a former minister, having held the positions of Minister of Fisheries, Equality and Nordic Cooperation, Minister of the Environment and Minister of the Interior and Social Affairs.

Ellemann is the daughter of former Foreign Minister, Uffe Ellemann-Jensen. She has a background as a teacher. She is married and has two children.

== Political career ==
Ellemann was elected in the municipal council of Rudersdal Municipality at the 2005 Danish local elections. It was the first time she ran for a political office and became one of the most voted-for politicians in the municipality, receiving 1,502 votes. She ran with an agenda focused on children and healthcare.

Following the 2007 Danish general election Ellemann was elected into parliament. She received 13,513 votes, which gave her a direct seat in the Greater Copenhagen constituency. She was appointed Minister of Interior and Social Affairs in the Lars Løkke Rasmussen I Cabinet, starting 7 April 2009. On 23 February 2010 there was a cabinet reshuffle, which resulted in Ellemann becoming the new Minister for Environment and Nordic Cooperation. At the time she had not been involved in environmental politics, which was commented on by the Danish Society for Nature Conservation and the opposition parties. They were worried that she would be unable to stand up to the new Minister of Agriculture Henrik Høegh.

She was reelected at the 2011 Danish general election, receiving 8,476 votes. This was the second-most votes received by a Venstre-politician in the municipality, with only Søren Pind receiving more votes with 15,101. She was elected again in the 2015 election with 7,020 votes. After the election Venstre had majority support in the Folketing, and Lars Løkke Rasmussen became the prime minister again. In his cabinet Ellemann was appointed Minister of the Interior and Social Affairs. She held this position until 28 November 2016, where Venstre went into a coalition government with Liberal Alliance and Conservative People's Party in the Lars Løkke Rasmussen III Cabinet. She became Minister for Gender Equality and Nordic Cooperation. 7 August 2017 she also became the Minister for Fisheries after a scandal involving the former Minister of Food, Agriculture and Fisheries Esben Lunde Larsen forced him to resign that part of his ministry. On 2 May 2018 Ellemann left the government to become the leader of Venstre's parliamentary group. She was the first woman holding that position.

Ellemann was reelected in the 2019 Danish general election, receiving 8,238 votes. In 2023, she became the Secretary General of the Nordic Council of Ministers.

Political offices
Preceded by Karen Jespersen	Minister of the Interior; 2009–2010	Succeeded by Bertel Haarder
Preceded by Karen Jespersen	Ministry of Social Affairs; 2009–2010	Succeeded by Benedikte Kiær
Preceded by Troels Lund Poulsen	Minister for the Environment; 2010–2011	Succeeded by Ida Auken
Preceded by Bertel Haarder	Minister for Nordic Cooperation; 2010–2011	Succeeded by Manu Sareen
Preceded by Manu Sareen	Minister of Social Affairs; 2015–2016	Succeeded by Mai Mercado
Preceded by Morten Østergaard	Minister of the Interior; 2015–2016	Succeeded by Simon Emil Ammitzbøll-Bille
Preceded by Ellen Trane Nørby	Minister for Gender Equality; 2016–2018	Succeeded by Eva Kjer Hansen
Preceded by Peter Christensen	Minister for Nordic Cooperation; 2016–2018	Succeeded by Eva Kjer Hansen
Preceded by Esben Lunde Larsen	Minister for Fisheries; 2016–2018	Succeeded by Eva Kjer Hansen
