= Lars Løkke Rasmussen III Cabinet =

Danish government from 2016 to 2019

Lars Løkke Rasmussen III
- 77th Cabinet of Denmark

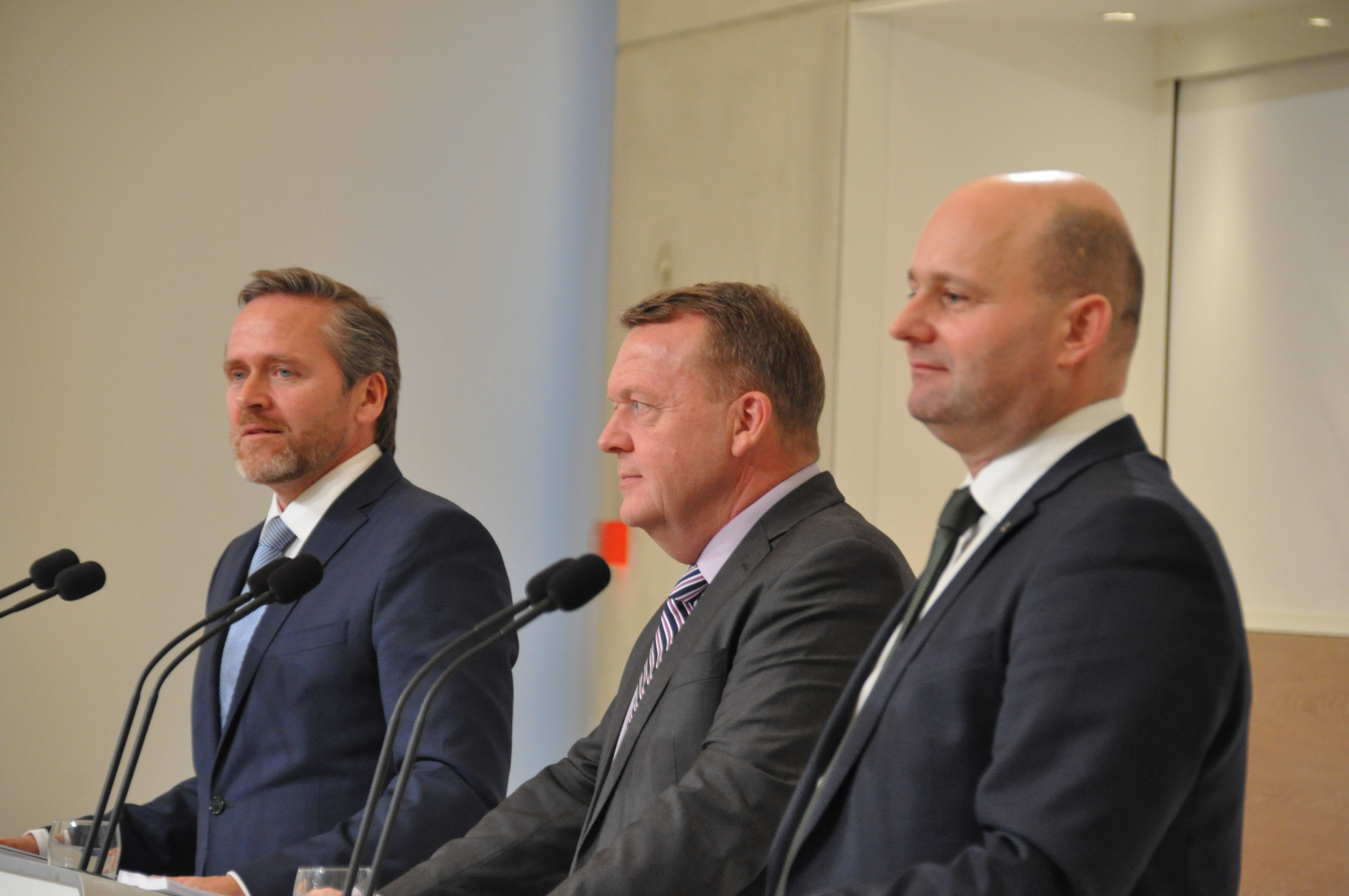
- Anders Samuelsen, Lars Løkke Rasmussen and Søren Pape Poulsen announcing the formation of the cabinet
- Date formed: 28 November 2016
- Date dissolved: 27 June 2019

People and organisations
- Monarch: Margrethe II
- Prime Minister: Lars Løkke Rasmussen
- Prime Minister's history: L. L. Rasmussen I; L. L. Rasmussen II
- Member parties: Venstre; Liberal Alliance; Conservatives; Supported by: Danish People's Party
- Status in legislature: Minority coalition government
- Opposition parties: Social Democrats; Red-Green Alliance; Alternative; Social Liberals; Green Left

History
- Election: —
- Legislature term: 2015–2019
- Predecessor: Løkke Rasmussen II
- Successor: Frederiksen I

The third cabinet of Lars Løkke Rasmussen (colloquially, VLAK-regeringen or trekløverregeringen) took office on 28 November 2016, succeeding the Second Cabinet of Lars Løkke Rasmussen. It was a minority coalition government consisting of Venstre, the Liberal Alliance and the Conservative People's Party. It relied on parliamentary support from the Danish People's Party. Following the 2019 general election, Rasmussen tabled his resignation and the government continued as a caretaker government until 27 June when the Frederiksen Cabinet was appointed.

== List of ministers ==
Portfolio	Minister	Took office	Left office	Party	Ref
Prime Minister	Lars Løkke Rasmussen	28 November 2016	27 June 2019	Venstre	
Minister of Foreign Affairs	Anders Samuelsen	28 November 2016	27 June 2019	Liberal Alliance	
Minister of Finance	Kristian Jensen	28 November 2016	27 June 2019	Venstre	
Minister of Economic Affairs and the Interior	Simon Emil Ammitzbøll	28 November 2016	27 June 2019	Liberal Alliance	
Minister of Justice	Søren Pape Poulsen	28 November 2016	27 June 2019	Conservatives	
Minister of Commerce, Business and Growth	Brian Mikkelsen	28 November 2016	21 June 2018	Conservatives	
Minister of Commerce, Business and Growth	Rasmus Jarlov	21 June 2018	27 June 2019	Conservatives	
Minister of Defence	Claus Hjort Frederiksen	28 November 2016	27 June 2019	Venstre	
Minister of Employment	Troels Lund Poulsen	28 November 2016	27 June 2019	Venstre	
Minister of Immigration and Integration	Inger Støjberg	28 November 2016	27 June 2019	Venstre	
Minister of Education	Merete Riisager	28 November 2016	27 June 2019	Liberal Alliance	
Minister of Health	Ellen Trane Nørby	28 November 2016	27 June 2019	Venstre	
Minister of Culture and Ecclesiastical Affairs	Mette Bock	28 November 2016	27 June 2019	Liberal Alliance	
Minister of Higher Education and Science	Søren Pind	28 November 2016	2 May 2018	Venstre	
Minister of Higher Education and Science	Tommy Ahlers	2 May 2018	27 June 2019	Independent	
Minister of Children and Social Affairs	Mai Mercado	28 November 2016	27 June 2019	Conservatives	
Minister of Transport, Building and Housing	Ole Birk Olesen	28 November 2016	27 June 2019	Liberal Alliance	
Minister of Taxation	Karsten Lauritzen	28 November 2016	27 June 2019	Venstre	
Minister of Elderly Affairs	Thyra Frank	28 November 2016	27 June 2019	Liberal Alliance	
Minister of Energy, Utilities and Climate	Lars Christian Lilleholt	28 November 2016	27 June 2019	Venstre	
Minister of Development Cooperation	Ulla Tørnæs	28 November 2016	27 June 2019	Venstre	
Minister of the Environment and Food	Esben Lunde Larsen	28 November 2016	2 May 2018	Venstre	
Minister of the Environment and Food	Jakob Ellemann-Jensen	2 May 2018	27 June 2019	Venstre	
Minister of Public Innovation	Sophie Løhde	28 November 2016	27 June 2019	Venstre	
Minister of Gender Equality and Minister of Nordic Cooperation	Karen Ellemann	28 November 2016	2 May 2018	Venstre	
Minister of Gender Equality and Minister of Nordic Cooperation	Eva Kjer Hansen	2 May 2018	27 June 2019	Venstre	

Preceded by Løkke Rasmussen II	Cabinet of Denmark; 2016–2019	Succeeded by Frederiksen
