= Minister of Food (Denmark) =

Danish minister

- Fødevareminister
- State coat of arms of the Kingdom of Denmark

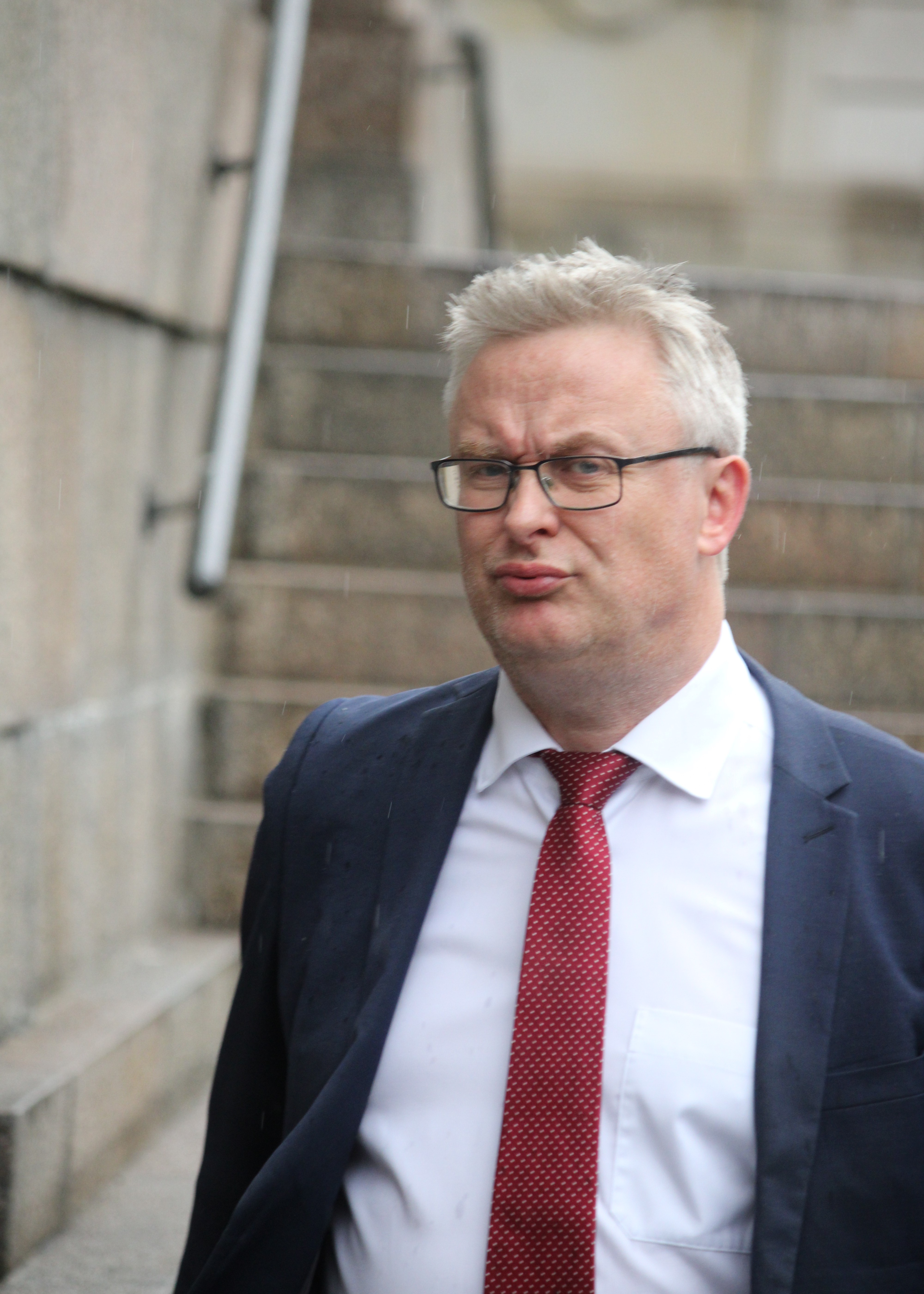
- Longest serving Jacob Jensen; 15 December 2022 – 3 June 2026
- Ministry of Food, Agriculture and Fisheries
- Type: Minister
- Member of: Cabinet; State Council
- Reports to: the Prime minister
- Seat: Slotsholmen
- Appointer: The Monarch (on the advice of the Prime Minister)
- Precursor: Minister of Agriculture; Minister for Fisheries
- Formation: 30 December 1996; 29 years ago
- First holder: Henrik Dam Kristensen
- Final holder: Jacob Jensen
- Abolished: 3 June 2026; 3 months ago
- Superseded by: Minister of Nature and Animal Welfare
- Succession: depending on the order in the State Council
- Deputy: Permanent Secretary
- Salary: 1.400.192,97 DKK (€187,839), in 2024
- Website: Official website

Minister of Food (Danish: Fødevareminister) is a Danish ministerial office. The responsibilities were originally placed with the Minister of Agriculture and Minister for Fisheries, first becoming collected in 1996.

== List of ministers ==
No.	Portrait	Name (born–died)	Term of office			Political party	Government	Ref.
No.	Portrait	Name (born–died)	Took office	Left office	Time in office	Political party	Government	Ref.
Minister for Food (Fødevareminister)
1		Henrik Dam Kristensen (born 1957)	30 December 1996	23 February 2000	3 years, 55 days	Social Democrats	P. N. Rasmussen III	
2		Ritt Bjerregaard (1941–2023)	23 February 2000	27 November 2001	1 year, 277 days	Social Democrats	P. N. Rasmussen IV	
3		Mariann Fischer Boel (born 1943)	27 November 2001	2 August 2004	2 years, 249 days	Venstre	A. F. Rasmussen I	
4		Hans Christian Schmidt (born 1953)	2 August 2004	12 September 2007	3 years, 41 days	Venstre	A. F. Rasmussen I–II	
5		Eva Kjer Hansen (born 1964)	12 September 2007	23 February 2010	2 years, 164 days	Venstre	A. F. Rasmussen II–III; L. L. Rasmussen I	
6		Henrik Høegh (born 1952)	23 February 2010	3 October 2011	1 year, 222 days	Venstre	L. L. Rasmussen I	
7		Mette Gjerskov (1966–2023)	3 October 2011	9 August 2013	1 year, 310 days	Social Democrats	Thorning-Schmidt I	
8		Karen Hækkerup (born 1974)	9 August 2013	12 December 2013	125 days	Social Democrats	Thorning-Schmidt I	
9		Dan Jørgensen (born 1975)	12 December 2013	28 June 2015	1 year, 198 days	Social Democrats	Thorning-Schmidt I–II	
Minister for the Environment and Food (Miljø- og fødevareminister)
(5)		Eva Kjer Hansen (born 1964)	28 June 2015	29 February 2016	246 days	Venstre	L. L. Rasmussen II	
10		Esben Lunde Larsen (born 1978)	29 February 2016	2 May 2018	2 years, 63 days	Venstre	L. L. Rasmussen II–III	
11		Jakob Ellemann-Jensen (born 1973)	2 May 2018	27 June 2019	1 year, 56 days	Venstre	L. L. Rasmussen III	
Minister for Food, Fishery and Gender Equality (Minister for fødevarer, fiskeri og ligestilling)
12		Mogens Jensen (born 1963)	27 June 2019	18 November 2020	1 year, 144 days	Social Democrats	Frederiksen I	
Minister for Agriculture, Food, Fishery (Minister for Landbrug-, Fødevare- og Fiskeri)
13		Rasmus Prehn (born 1973)	19 November 2020	15 December 2022	2 years, 26 days	Social Democrats	Frederiksen I	
14		Jacob Jensen (born 1973)	15 December 2022	3 June 2026	3 years, 170 days	Venstre	Frederiksen II	
