= Minister for the Environment (Denmark) =

Danish cabinet position

Minister of the Environment
- Miljøminister
- State coat of arms of the Kingdom of Denmark

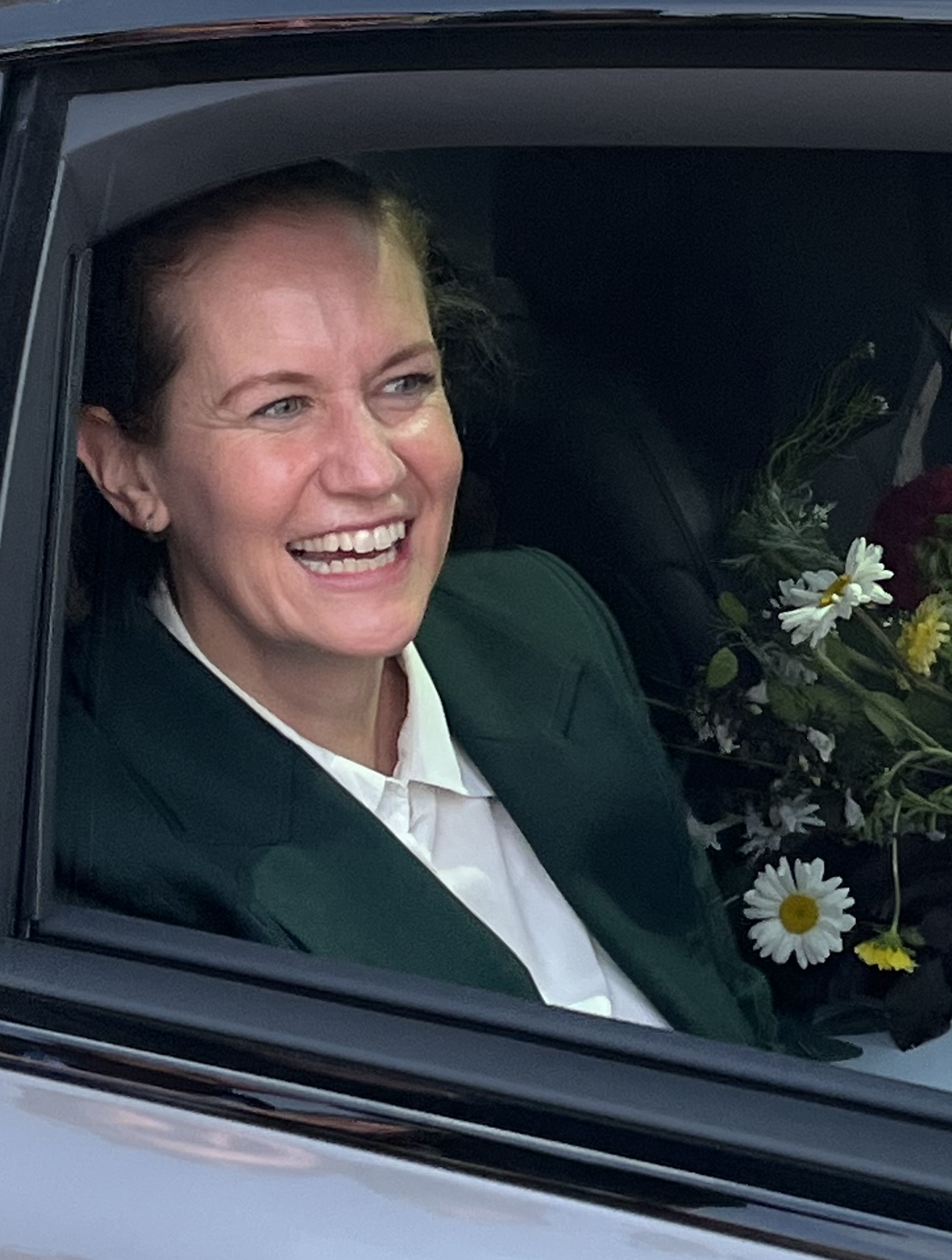
- Incumbent; Maria Reumert Gjerding since 3 June 2026
- Ministry of the Environment
- Type: Minister
- Member of: Cabinet; State Council
- Reports to: the Prime minister
- Seat: Slotsholmen
- Appointer: The Monarch (on the advice of the Prime Minister)
- Formation: 11 October 1971; 54 years ago
- First holder: Jens Kampmann
- Succession: depending on the order in the State Council
- Deputy: Permanent Secretary
- Salary: 1.624.503,02 DKK (€217,931), in 2026
- Website: Official website

The Danish Minister of the Environment (Danish: Miljøminister), is a minister in the government of Denmark, with overall responsibility for strategy and policy across the Ministry of the Environment. The ministry and the ministerial position were created in 1971. From 1971 to 1973, the ministry was named the "Ministry of Pollution Control".

== List of ministers ==
No.	Portrait	Name (born–died)	Term of office			Political party	Government	Ref.
No.	Portrait	Name (born–died)	Took office	Left office	Time in office	Political party	Government	Ref.
Minister of Public Works and Pollution Control (Minister for offentlige arbejder og forureningsbekæmpelse)
1		Jens Kampmann (1937–2026)	11 October 1971	27 September 1973	1 year, 351 days	Social Democrats	Krag III; Jørgensen I	
Minister of the Environment (Miljøminister)
2		Helge Nielsen (1918–1991)	27 September 1973	19 December 1973	1 year, 351 days	Social Democrats	Jørgensen I	
3		Holger Hansen (1929–2015)	19 December 1973	13 February 1975	1 year, 56 days	Venstre	Hartling	
(2)		Helge Nielsen (1918–1991)	13 February 1975	26 January 1977	1 year, 348 days	Social Democrat	Jørgensen II	
4		Svend Jakobsen (1935–2022)	26 January 1977	26 February 1977	31 days	Social Democrat	Jørgensen II	
5		Niels Matthiasen (1924–1980)	26 February 1977	30 August 1978	1 year, 185 days	Social Democrat	Jørgensen II	
6		Ivar Nørgaard (1922–2011)	30 August 1978	28 February 1980	1 year, 182 days	Social Democrat	Jørgensen III	
7		Erik Holst (1922–2013)	28 February 1980	10 September 1982	2 years, 194 days	Social Democrats	Jørgensen III–IV–V	
8		Christian Christensen (1925–1988)	10 September 1982	3 June 1988	5 years, 267 days	Christian Democrats	Schlüter I–II	
9		Lone Dybkjær (1940–2020)	3 June 1988	18 December 1990	2 years, 198 days	Social Liberal	Schlüter III	
10		Per Stig Møller (born 1942)	18 December 1990	25 January 1993	2 years, 38 days	Conservative People's Party	Schlüter IV	
Minister of the Environment and Energy (Miljø- og energiminister)
11		Svend Auken (1943–2009)	25 January 1993	27 November 2001	8 years, 306 days	Social Democrats	P. N. Rasmussen I–II–III–IV	
Minister of the Environment (Miljøminister)
12		Hans Christian Schmidt (born 1953)	27 November 2001	2 August 2004	2 years, 249 days	Venstre	A. F. Rasmussen I	
13		Connie Hedegaard (born 1960)	2 August 2004	23 November 2007	3 years, 113 days	Conservative People's Party	A. F. Rasmussen I–II	
14		Troels Lund Poulsen (born 1976)	23 November 2007	23 February 2010	2 years, 92 days	Venstre	A. F. Rasmussen III; L. L. Rasmussen I	
15		Karen Ellemann (born 1969)	23 February 2010	3 October 2011	1 year, 222 days	Venstre	L. L. Rasmussen I	
16		Ida Auken (born 1978)	3 October 2011	3 February 2014	2 years, 123 days	Green Left	Thorning-Schmidt I	
17		Kirsten Brosbøl (born 1977)	3 February 2014	28 June 2015	1 year, 145 days	Social Democrats	Thorning-Schmidt II	
Minister of the Environment and Food (Miljø- og fødevareminister)
18		Eva Kjer Hansen (born 1964)	28 June 2015	29 February 2016	246 days	Venstre	L. L. Rasmussen II	
19		Esben Lunde Larsen (born 1978)	29 February 2016	2 May 2018	2 years, 63 days	Venstre	L. L. Rasmussen II–III	
20		Jakob Ellemann-Jensen (born 1973)	2 May 2018	27 June 2019	1 year, 56 days	Venstre	L. L. Rasmussen III	
Minister of the Environment (Miljøminister)
21		Lea Wermelin (born 1985)	27 June 2019	15 December 2022	3 years, 171 days	Social Democrats	Frederiksen I	
22		Magnus Heunicke (born 1975)	15 December 2022	3 June 2026	3 years, 170 days	Social Democrats	Frederiksen II	
23		Maria Reumert Gjerding (born 1978)	3 June 2026	Incumbent	96 days	Green Left	Frederiksen III	
