= Minister for Gender Equality =

Minister for Gender Equality may refer to:

- Minister for Gender Equality (Denmark)
- Minister of Equality (Spain)
- Minister for Gender Equality (Sweden)
