= Minister for Nordic Cooperation (Denmark) =

Danish cabinet position

Minister of Nordic Cooperation
- Minister for Nordisk Samarbejde
- State coat of arms of the Kingdom of Denmark

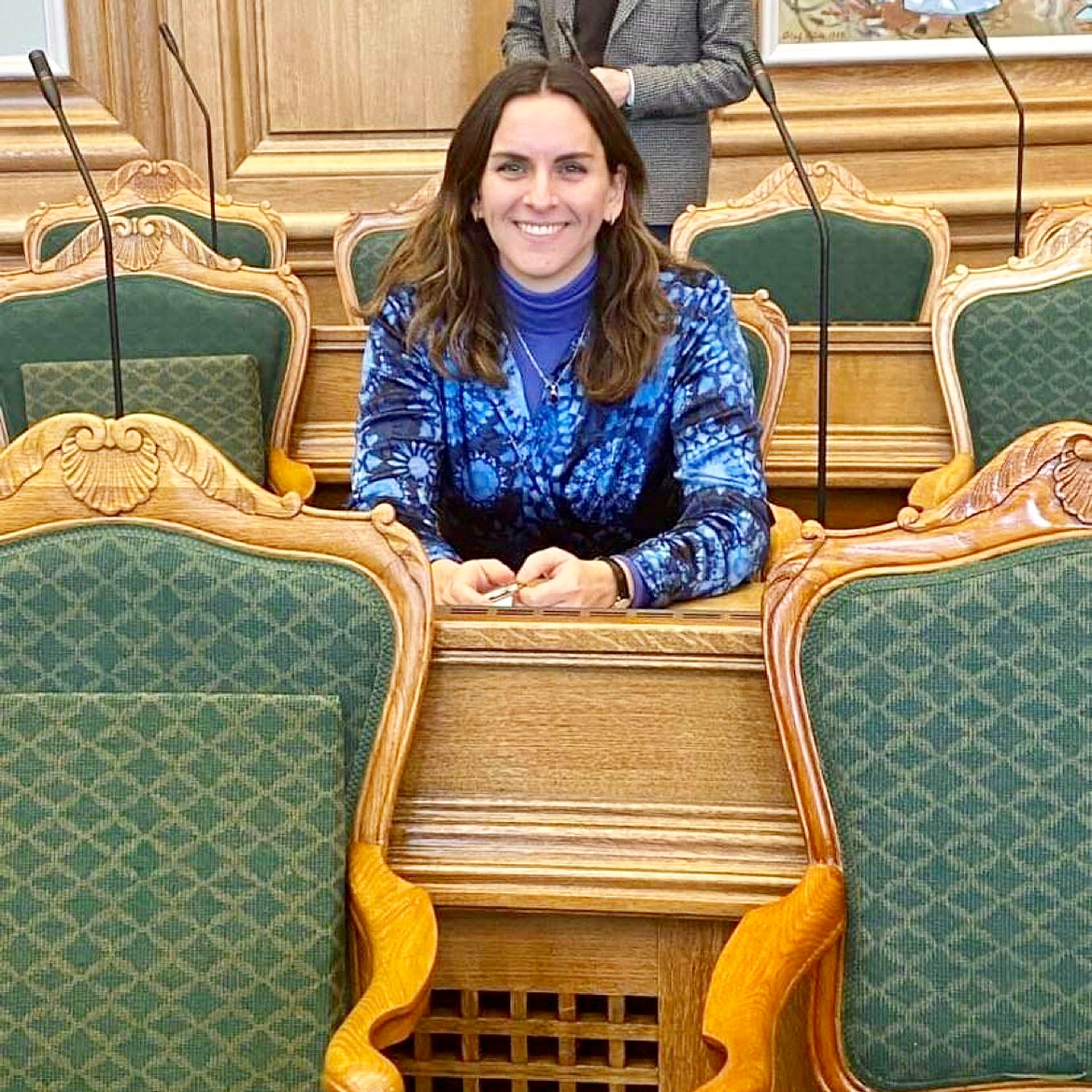
- Incumbent; Monika Rubin since 3 June 2026
- Type: Minister
- Member of: Cabinet; State Council
- Reports to: the Prime minister
- Seat: Slotsholmen
- Appointer: The Monarch; (on the advice of the Prime Minister)
- Formation: 28 May 1957; 69 years ago
- First holder: Bertel Dahlgaard
- Succession: depending on the order in the State Council
- Deputy: Permanent Secretary
- Salary: 1.624.503,02 DKK (€217,931), in 2026

The Minister of Nordic Cooperation (Danish: Minister for Nordisk Samarbejde; prev. Minister of Nordic Affairs (Danish: Minister for Nordiske Anliggender)) is a cabinet minister within the Danish Government appointed by the Prime Minister of Denmark.

The minister is responsible for issues regarding Nordic affairs, trade and development. The current Minister for Nordic Cooperation is Monika Rubin, appointed on 3 June 2026.

== List of ministers ==
No.	Portrait	Name (born-died)	Term of office			Political party	Government	Ref.
No.	Portrait	Name (born-died)	Took office	Left office	Time in office	Political party	Government	Ref.
Minister of Nordic Affairs (Danish: Minister for nordiske anliggender)
1		Bertel Dahlgaard (1887–1972)	28 May 1957	18 November 1960	3 years, 174 days	Social Liberal	Hansen II	
2		Henry Grünbaum (1911–2006)	8 October 1964	15 July 1965	280 days	Social Democrats	Krag II	
3		Lars P. Jensen (1909–1986)	15 July 1965	21 September 1966	1 year, 68 days	Social Democrats	Krag II	
4		Tyge Dahlgaard (1921–1985)	21 September 1966	1 October 1967	1 year, 10 days	Social Democrats	Krag II	
5		Ove Hansen (1909–1997)	1 October 1967	2 February 1968	124 days	Social Democrats	Krag II	
6		Poul Nyboe Andersen (1913–2004)	2 February 1968	11 October 1971	3 years, 251 days	Venstre	Baunsgaard	
7		Ivar Nørgaard (1922–2011)	11 October 1971	19 December 1973	1 year, 351 days	Social Democrats	Krag III; Jørgensen I	
Minister of Foreign Economic and Nordic Affairs (Minister for udenrigsøkonomi og for nordiske anliggender)
(7)		Ivar Nørgaard (1922–2011)	29 January 1975	26 February 1977	2 years, 28 days	Social Democrats	Jørgensen II	
Minister of Nordic Affairs (Minister for nordiske anliggender)
8		Lise Østergaard (1924–1996)	28 February 1980	10 September 1982	2 years, 194 days	Social Democrats	Jørgensen IV–V	
9		Christian Christensen (1925–1988)	10 September 1982	10 September 1987	5 years, 0 days	Christian Democrats	Schlüter I	
Minister of Nordic Cooperation (Minister for nordiske samarbejde)
10		Lars P. Gammelgaard (1945–1994)	10 September 1987	3 June 1988	267 days	Conservative People's Party	Schlüter II	
11		Thor Pedersen (born 1945)	3 June 1988	19 December 1992	4 years, 199 days	Venstre	Schlüter III–IV	
12		Knud Enggaard (1929–2024)	19 December 1992	25 January 1993	37 days	Venstre	Schlüter IV	
13		Flemming Kofod-Svendsen (born 1944)	25 January 1993	27 September 1994	1 year, 245 days	Christian Democrats	P. N. Rasmussen I	
14		Marianne Jelved (born 1943)	27 September 1994	27 November 2001	7 years, 61 days	Social Liberal	P. N. Rasmussen II–III–IV	
15		Bendt Bendtsen (born 1954)	27 November 2001	18 June 2002	203 days	Conservative People's Party	A. F. Rasmussen I	
16		Flemming Hansen (1939–2021)	18 June 2002	18 February 2005	2 years, 245 days	Conservative People's Party	A. F. Rasmussen I	
17		Connie Hedegaard (born 1960)	18 February 2005	23 November 2007	2 years, 278 days	Conservative People's Party	A. F. Rasmussen II	
18		Bertel Haarder (born 1944)	23 November 2007	23 February 2010	2 years, 92 days	Venstre	A. F. Rasmussen III; L. L. Rasmussen I	
19		Karen Ellemann (born 1969)	23 February 2010	3 October 2011	1 year, 222 days	Venstre	L. L. Rasmussen I	
20		Manu Sareen (born 1967)	3 October 2011	3 February 2014	2 years, 123 days	Social Liberal	Thorning-Schmidt I	
21		Carsten Hansen (born 1957)	3 February 2014	28 June 2015	1 year, 145 days	Social Democrat	Thorning-Schmidt II	
22		Carl Holst (born 1970)	28 June 2015	30 September 2015	94 days	Venstre	L. L. Rasmussen II	
23		Peter Christensen (1975–2025)	30 September 2015	28 November 2016	1 year, 59 days	Venstre	L. L. Rasmussen II	
(19)		Karen Ellemann (born 1969)	28 November 2016	2 May 2018	1 year, 155 days	Venstre	L. L. Rasmussen III	
24		Eva Kjer Hansen (born 1964)	2 May 2018	27 June 2019	1 year, 56 days	Venstre	L. L. Rasmussen III	
25		Mogens Jensen (born 1963)	27 June 2019	18 November 2020	1 year, 144 days	Social Democrats	Frederiksen I	
26		Flemming Møller Mortensen (born 1963)	19 November 2020	15 December 2022	2 years, 26 days	Social Democrats	Frederiksen I	
27		Louise Schack Elholm (born 1977)	15 December 2022	23 November 2023	343 days	Venstre	Frederiksen II	
28		Morten Dahlin (born 1989)	23 November 2023	3 June 2026	2 years, 192 days	Venstre	Frederiksen II	
29		Monika Rubin (born 1987)	3 June 2026	Incumbent	143 days	Moderates	Frederiksen III	

== See also ==
- Minister for Nordic Cooperation (Finland)
- Minister for Nordic Cooperation (Iceland)
- Minister for Nordic Cooperation (Sweden)
