= Lars Løkke Rasmussen I Cabinet =

Danish cabinet (2009-2011)

First cabinet of Lars Løkke Rasmussen
- 73rd Cabinet of Denmark

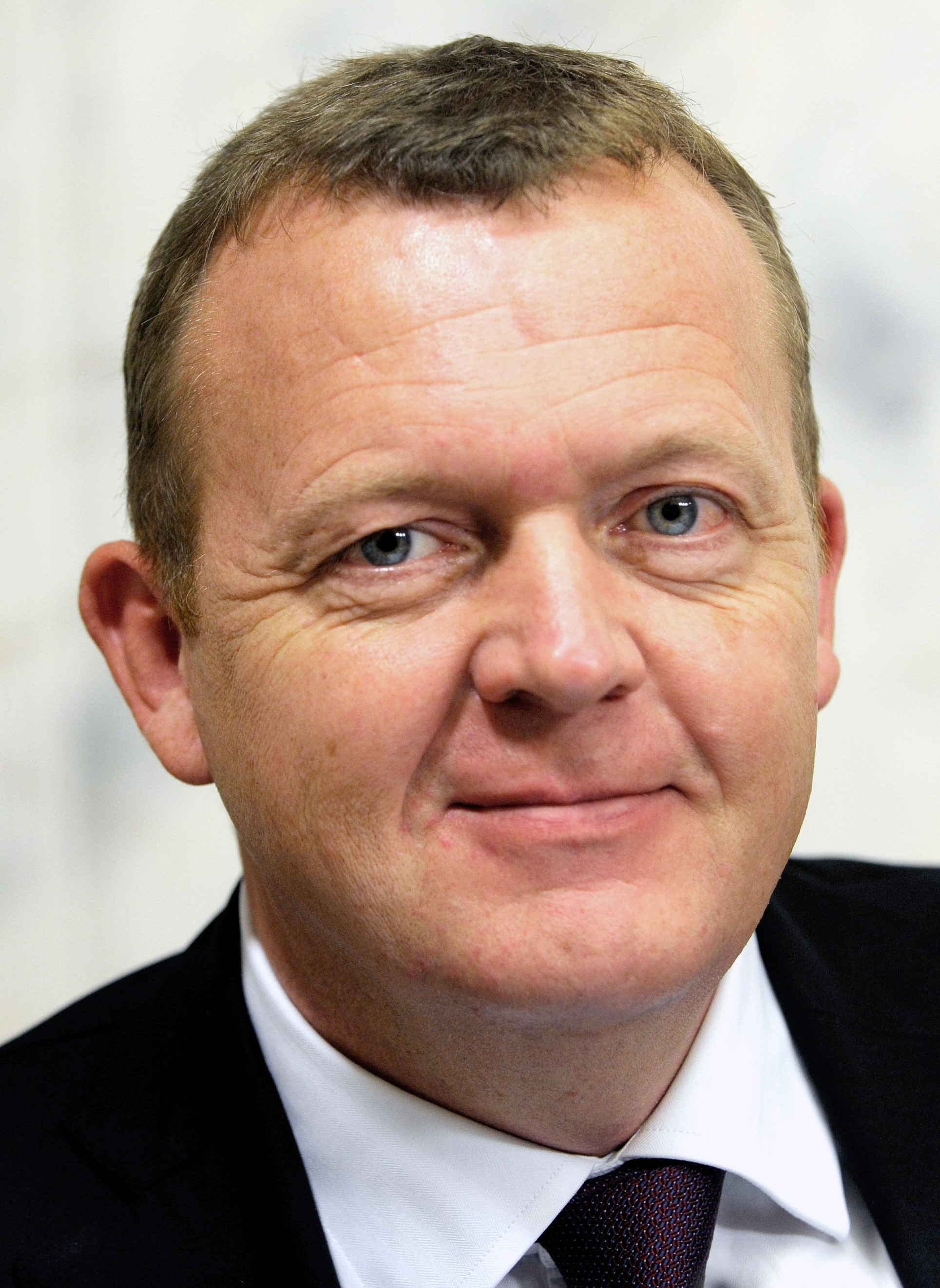
- Date formed: 5 April 2009
- Date dissolved: 3 October 2011

People and organisations
- Monarch: Margrethe II of Denmark
- Prime Minister: Lars Løkke Rasmussen
- No. of ministers: 23
- Total no. of members: 36
- Member parties: Venstre; Conservatives; Supported by: Danish People's Party
- Status in legislature: Minority coalition government
- Opposition parties: Social Democrats; Green Left; Social Liberals; Liberal Alliance; Red-Green Alliance

History
- Predecessor: A. F. Rasmussen III
- Successor: Thorning-Schmidt I

The First cabinet of Lars Løkke Rasmussen, was announced on 5 April 2009 as Lars Løkke became prime minister after Anders Fogh Rasmussen was offered the post of Secretary General of NATO on 4 April 2009.

Following the 2011 parliamentary election, Lars Løkke Rasmussen was replaced as Prime Minister of Denmark by the Social Democrat Helle Thorning-Schmidt.

== Changes from the cabinet of Anders Fogh Rasmussen III ==
On 7 April 2009 Lars Løkke Rasmussen announced the following changes from the cabinet of Anders Fogh Rasmussen III: Claus Hjort Frederiksen became Minister of Finance after Lars Løkke Rasmussen, and Frederiksen's previous post of Minister of Employment is filled by Inger Støjberg, previously not a minister, who also becomes Minister for Equal Rights. Following Karen Jespersen's announcement that she wished to withdraw as Minister for Social Welfare, that ministry is abolished and a new combined ministry of the interior and of social affairs is taken over by Karen Ellemann.

On 23 February 2010 Løkke Rasmussen announced a major reshuffle, which affected all ministers except for Claus Hjort Frederiksen, Birthe Rønn Hornbech and the prime minister himself.

On 8 March 2011 some minor changes were announced in connection with the firing of Birthe Rønn Hornbech from her position as Minister for Integration as a result of a scandal involving the right of citizenship for stateless residents.

== List of ministers and portfolios ==
Some periods in the table below start before April 2009 because the ministers were also in the Cabinet of Anders Fogh Rasmussen I, II and III.

Portfolio	Minister	Took office	Left office	Party
Prime Minister	Lars Løkke Rasmussen	5 April 2009	3 October 2011	Venstre
Foreign Minister	Per Stig Møller	27 November 2001	23 February 2010	Conservatives
Foreign Minister	Lene Espersen	23 February 2010	3 October 2011	Conservatives
Finance Minister	Claus Hjort Frederiksen	7 April 2009	3 October 2011	Venstre
Justice Minister	Brian Mikkelsen	10 September 2008	23 February 2010	Conservatives
Justice Minister	Lars Barfoed	23 February 2010	3 October 2011	Conservatives
Minister of Defense	Søren Gade	24 April 2004	23 February 2010	Venstre
Minister of Defense	Gitte Lillelund Bech	23 February 2010	3 October 2011	Venstre
Culture Minister	Carina Christensen	10 September 2008	23 February 2010	Conservatives
Culture Minister	Per Stig Møller	23 February 2010	3 October 2011	Conservatives
Minister of the Interior	Karen Ellemann	7 April 2009	23 February 2010	Venstre
Minister of the Interior	Bertel Haarder	23 February 2010	3 October 2011	Venstre
Minister for Taxation	Kristian Jensen	2 August 2004	23 February 2010	Venstre
Minister for Taxation	Troels Lund Poulsen	23 February 2010	8 March 2011	Venstre
Minister for Taxation	Peter Christensen	8 March 2011	3 October 2011	Venstre
MMinister of Business Affairs and Growth	Lene Espersen	10 September 2008	23 February 2010	Conservatives
MMinister of Business Affairs and Growth	Brian Mikkelsen	23 February 2010	3 October 2011	Conservatives
Minister of Nordic Cooperation	Bertel Haarder	23 November 2007	3 October 2011	Venstre
Minister for Food, Agriculture and Fisheries	Eva Kjer Hansen	12 September 2007	23 February 2010	Venstre
Minister for Food, Agriculture and Fisheries	Henrik Høegh	23 February 2010	3 October 2011	Venstre
Minister of Employment	Inger Støjberg	7 April 2009	3 October 2011	Venstre
Minister of Science, Technology and Development	Helge Sander	27 November 2001	23 February 2010	Venstre
Minister of Science, Technology and Development	Charlotte Sahl-Madsen	23 February 2010	3 October 2011	Conservatives
Minister of Education	Bertel Haarder	18 February 2005	23 February 2010	Venstre
Minister of Education	Tina Nedergaard	23 February 2010	8 March 2011	Venstre
Minister of Education	Troels Lund Poulsen	8 March 2011	3 October 2011	Venstre
Minister for Ecclesiastical Affairs	Birthe Rønn Hornbech	23 November 2007	8 March 2011	Venstre
Minister for Ecclesiastical Affairs	Per Stig Møller	8 March 2011	3 October 2011	Conservatives
Minister for Development Cooperation	Ulla Tørnæs	18 February 2005	23 February 2010	Venstre
Minister for Development Cooperation	Søren Pind	23 February 2010	3 October 2011	Venstre
Minister of Social Affairs	Karen Ellemann	7 April 2009	23 February 2010	Venstre
Minister of Social Affairs	Benedikte Kiær	23 February 2010	3 October 2011	Conservatives
Minister for Equal Rights	Inger Støjberg	7 April 2009	23 February 2010	Venstre
Minister for Equal Rights	Lykke Friis	23 February 2010	3 October 2011	Venstre
Minister for Climate and Energy	Connie Hedegaard	23 November 2007	24 November 2009	Conservatives
Minister for Climate and Energy	Lykke Friis	24 November 2009	3 October 2011	Venstre
Minister for Transport	Lars Barfoed	10 September 2008	23 February 2010	Conservatives
Minister for Transport	Hans Christian Schmidt	23 February 2010	3 October 2011	Venstre
Minister of Health and Prevention	Jakob Axel Nielsen	23 November 2007	23 February 2010	Conservatives
Minister of Health and Prevention	Bertel Haarder	23 February 2010	3 October 2011	Venstre
Minister of Refugees, Immigrants and Integration	Birthe Rønn Hornbech	23 November 2007	8 March 2011	Venstre
Minister of Refugees, Immigrants and Integration	Søren Pind	8 March 2011	3 October 2011	Venstre
Minister for the Environment	Troels Lund Poulsen	23 November 2007	23 February 2010	Venstre
Minister for the Environment	Karen Ellemann	23 February 2010	3 October 2011	Venstre

Preceded by Anders Fogh Rasmussen III	Cabinet of Denmark; 5 April 2009 – 3 october 2011	Succeeded by Helle Thorning-Schmidt I
