= Ellen Trane Nørby =

Danish politician (born 1980)

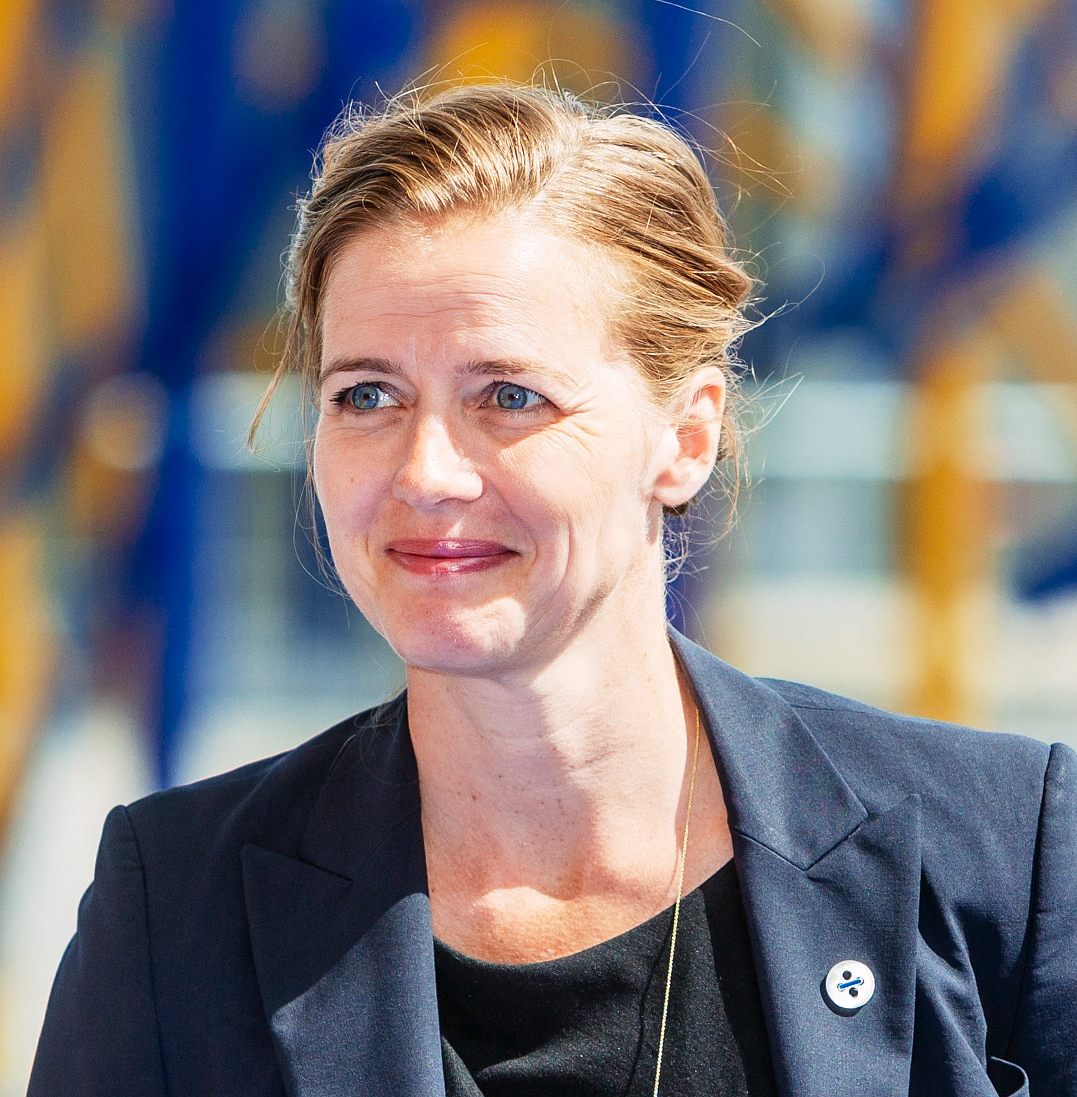
- Ellen Trane Nørby

Minister of Health
- In office 28 November 2016 – 27 June 2019

Minister for Children, Education and Gender Equality
- In office 28 June 2015 – 28 November 2016

Member of the Folketing
- Incumbent
- Assumed office 8 February 2005
- Constituency: South Jutland

Personal details
- Born: 1 February 1980 (age 46) Herning, Denmark
- Party: Venstre

Ellen Trane Nørby (born 1 February 1980 in Herning) is a Danish politician, who is a member of the Folketing for the Venstre political party. From 28 November 2016 to 27 June 2019, she was Denmark's Minister of Health.

== Background ==
Ellen Trane Nørby was born in Herning, a midsized manufacturing and administrative town in the centre of Jutland. She grew up in Nørre Nissum, a large village on the edge of Lemvig along country's west coast. Jørgen Andreas Nørby, her father, is a biologist and secondary school teacher who served as municipal mayor of Lemvig between 1998 and 2006. Her mother is an architect. Nørby attended school in Nørre Nissum between 1985 and 1995, then moving on to the Gymnasium (Upper School) at Lemwig. She enrolled at Copenhagen University where from 1998 she studied Art History, with a side module between 1999 and 2001 on political sciences. She concluded her university level studies in 2005 with a "Master of Arts" degree.

While still a student she had already worked at the Christiansborg Palace, home to Denmark's government and national parliament.

== Political career ==
She joined the Venstre party and its youth organisation in 1995. In 1999, she became vice-president of the European Liberal Youth organisation comprising, for the most part, the youth wings of members of the Alliance of Liberals and Democrats for Europe Party. Between 2002 and 2004 she was the association president. In 2004, she stood for election to the European parliament. Her 24,380 votes were not sufficient to win her a seat in the assembly, however.

She stood for election to the national parliament in 2005. Venstre had been in power as the largest party in a coalition government since 2001, and although their support slipped in 2005 they remained the largest party. Nørby won 5,073 votes which was enough to secure her a seat in parliament. She became her party's spokesperson for culture and the arts. Support for Venstre slipped again in 2007, but they were still, by a small margin, the largest party. Nørby's own support increased to 12,804 votes in her South Jutland electoral district. In this parliamentary session her focus was on social issues and gender equality. Her vote level increased again in 2011, this time to 18,059 votes. This was the highest number of votes received by any of the Venstre candidates in 2011. Her 12,012 votes in the 2015 election were again comfortably more than were won by most (if, this time, not quite all) of her fellow Venstre candidates. Between 2006 and her first ministerial appointment, in 2015, Ellen Trane Nørby was her party's spokesperson on "new media" questions.

On 28 June 2015, she was appointed Minister for Children, Education and Equality in the Lars Løkke Rasmussen minority government formed that year. On 28 November 2016, when that government was replaced by the Lars Løkke Rasmussen coalition government, she was transferred to the Ministry of Health.

=== Media profile ===
In Autumn 2012, as an opposition spokesperson, Ellen Trane Nørby submitted 696 parliamentary questions to Uffe Elbæk, the Minister for Culture and The Arts. This performance earned Nørby the soubriquet "Spørge-Ellen" ("Questions Ellen") from the mass-market tabloid newspaper BT.

A more negative press encounter came about in January 2013 when the BT journalist Lars Fogt reported the allegation that student supporters working for Nørby had made more than thirty changes to her Danish Wikipedia entry since March 2011. She reacted promptly and fiercely, asserting that she was being subjected to a "journalistic campaign of personal hatred" from the tabloid BT, which was then being picked up and reported without critical evaluation by other press outlets.

== Publications ==
- Smag på Europa – med honning & chili (Saxo, 2004)

Political offices
Preceded by Sophie Løhde	Minister of Health; 2016–2019	Succeeded by Magnus Heunicke
Preceded by Manu Sareen	Minister for Children; 2015–2016	Succeeded by Mai Mercado
Preceded by Christine Antorini	Minister of Education; 2015–2016	Succeeded by Merete Riisager
Preceded by Manu Sareen	Minister for Gender Equality; 2015–2016	Succeeded by Karen Ellemann
