= Svend Auken =

Danish politician

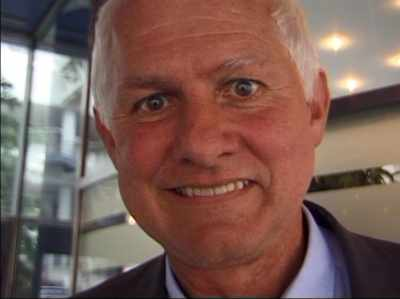
- Svend Auken, 1998

Leader of the Social Democrats
- In office 1987–1992
- Preceded by: Anker Jørgensen
- Succeeded by: Poul Nyrup Rasmussen

Member of the Folketing
- In office 21 September 1971 – 4 August 2009
- Constituency: Aarhus East

Minister for Employment
- In office 1 October 1977 – 10 September 1982
- Prime Minister: Anker Jørgensen
- Preceded by: Erling Jensen
- Succeeded by: Grethe Fenger Møller

Minister for the Environment
- In office 25 January 1993 – 27 November 2001
- Prime Minister: Poul Nyrup Rasmussen
- Preceded by: Per Stig Møller
- Succeeded by: Hans Christian Schmidt

Minister of the Environment and Energy
- In office 27 September 1994 – 27 November 2001
- Prime Minister: Poul Nyrup Rasmussen
- Preceded by: Jann Sjursen
- Succeeded by: Flemming Hansen (Transport and Energy)

Personal details
- Born: 24 May 1943 Aarhus, Denmark
- Died: 4 August 2009 (aged 66) Copenhagen, Denmark
- Resting place: Cemetery of Holmen
- Party: Social Democrats

Svend Gunnarsen Auken (Danish pronunciation: [ˈsvenˀ ˈɑwˀkŋ̍]; 24 May 1943 – 4 August 2009) was a Danish politician. He represented the Social Democrats as a member of the Danish parliament (Folketinget) from 1971 until his death.

He was married to journalist and editor Bettina Heltberg from 1966 to 1993. At his death he was married to film director Anne Wivel. He had four children. Margrete Auken is his sister.

He died of prostate cancer on 4 August 2009.

== Political career ==
Auken held a degree in political science from the University of Aarhus and also taught there for a period in the very early 1970s. He was Minister of Employment from 1 October 1977 to 10 September 1982 in the Cabinet of Anker Jørgensen II, III, IV, and V.

In 1987 Svend Auken succeeded Jørgensen as leader of the Danish Social Democrats, at that time an opposition party to the government of Prime Minister Poul Schlüter. After making big gains in the 1990 general election, he was subsequently unable to put together a workable coalition, partly because of bad personal relations with prominent politicians in the traditional coalition party of the Social Democrats, Det Radikale Venstre (The Social Liberal Party of Denmark).

His position as leader of the Social Democrats was challenged in 1992 by Poul Nyrup Rasmussen, who went on to win the internal election. That gave Auken the dubious distinction of being the first Social Democratic leader since 1910 to not become prime minister. (Subsequently, this has happened to Mogens Lykketoft, leader from 2002 to 2005, as well.)

Poul Nyrup Rasmussen went on to become Prime Minister of Denmark in 1993, and Auken served as Minister for the Environment from 25 January 1993 to 27 September 1994 in the Cabinet of Poul Nyrup Rasmussen I and was Minister for the Environment and Energy from 27 September 1994 to 27 November 2001 in the Cabinet of Poul Nyrup Rasmussen II, III and IV.

After the defeat of Rasmussen's government in the general election of 2001, Svend Auken continued to serve as a member of the Danish parliament. He was the EU-affairs spokesman of his party until his death, and he maintained a high profile on environmental issues.

Svend Auken was generally acknowledged to be one of the most naturally gifted and charismatic Danish politicians of his generation, and he is sometimes referred to as "the best Prime Minister Denmark never had". He is one of the few Danish politicians to be honoured in the United States House of Representatives by Steny Hoyer.

Political offices
Preceded by Erling Jensen	Minister of Employment; 1 October 1977 – 10 September 1982	Succeeded by Grethe Fenger Møller
Preceded by Per Stig Møller	Minister for the Environment; 25 January 1993 – 27 November 2001	Succeeded by Hans Christian Schmidt
Preceded by Jann Sjursen	Energy Minister; 27 September 1994 – 27 November 2001	Succeeded by Office abolished
Party political offices
Preceded by Anker Jørgensen	Leader of the Danish Social Democrats; 1987–1992	Succeeded by Poul Nyrup Rasmussen
