= Lykke Friis =

Danish politician (born 1969)

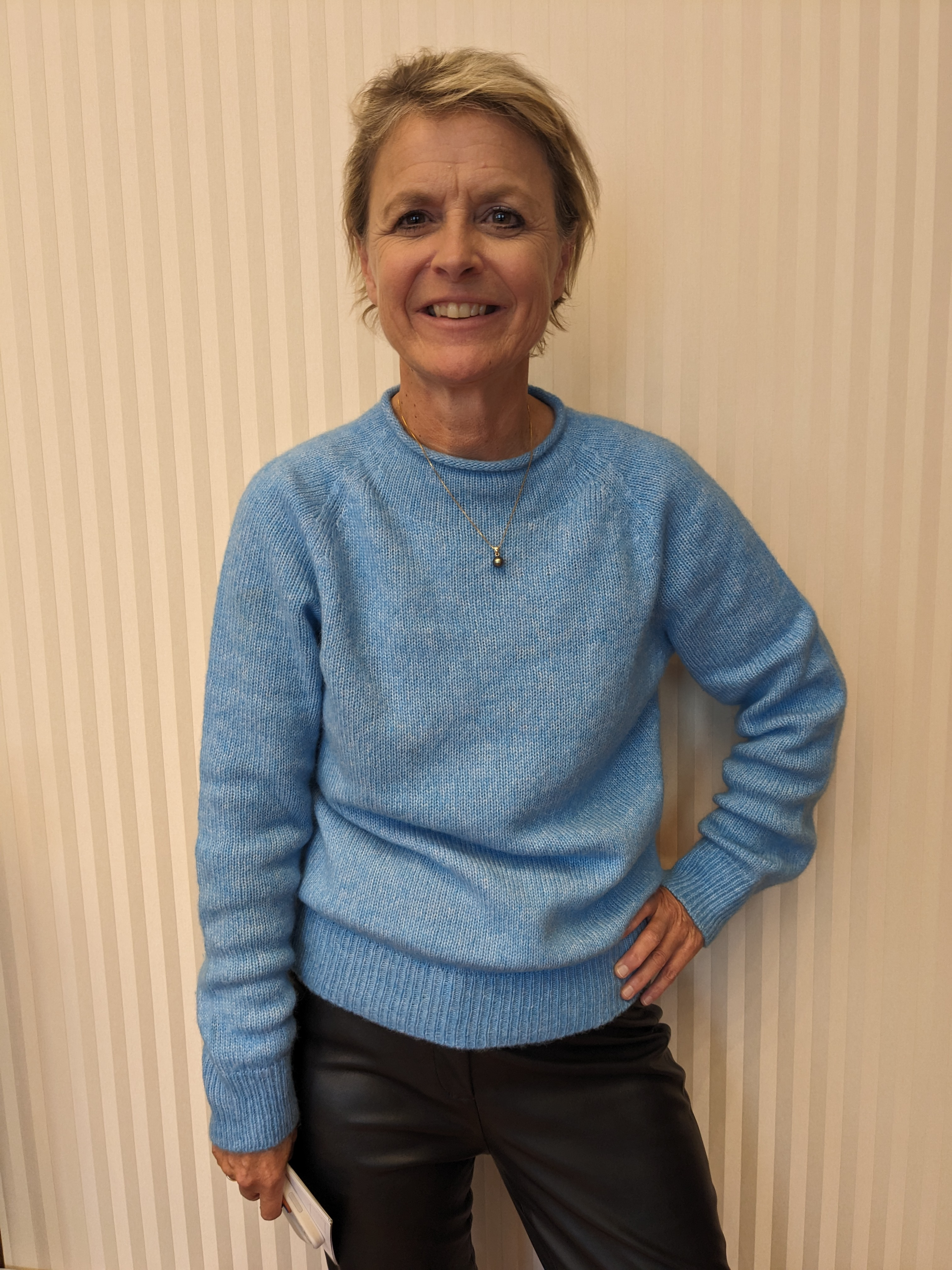
- Lykke Friis i Berlin, 2023

Minister for Climate and Energy
- In office 2009–2011
- Monarch: Margrethe II
- Prime Minister: Lars Løkke Rasmussen
- Preceded by: Connie Hedegaard
- Succeeded by: Martin Lidegaard and Ida Auken

Minister for Equal Rights
- In office 2010–2011

Personal details
- Born: 27 October 1969 (age 56)
- Party: Venstre

Lykke Friis (born 27 October 1969) is a Danish academic official and former politician. She is currently Prorector for Education at the University of Copenhagen, a position she previously held from 2006 to 2009. A member of the party Venstre, Friis served as Minister for Climate and Energy from 2009 to 2011, and Minister for Gender Equality from 2010 to 2011.

== Early life and education ==
Lykke Friis is the daughter of a Danish father and a German mother. She graduated from Øregård Gymnasium and studied political science at the University of Copenhagen. Lykke Friis obtained her M.Sc. in economics and political science from London School of Economics in 1992, followed by a M.Sc. in political science from University of Copenhagen in 1993. She got a PhD in international politics from the University of Copenhagen in 1997. Eisenhower Fellowships selected Friis in 2002 to represent Denmark.

== Career ==
Friis has worked as an academic in the Ministry of Economic and Business Affairs, and as a researcher in Dansk Udenrigspolitisk Institut. From 2003 until 2006, she was head of European Politics in the Confederation of Danish Industries. She has taught at both the University of Copenhagen Faculty of Social Sciences and at Copenhagen Business School in international relations.

During her time as minister, Friis presided over the 2009 United Nations Climate Change Conference in Copenhagen. In 2011, she oversaw the Danish government's plan to wean itself off coal, oil and natural gas by 2050 by boosting energy efficiency and the use of renewable energy sources.

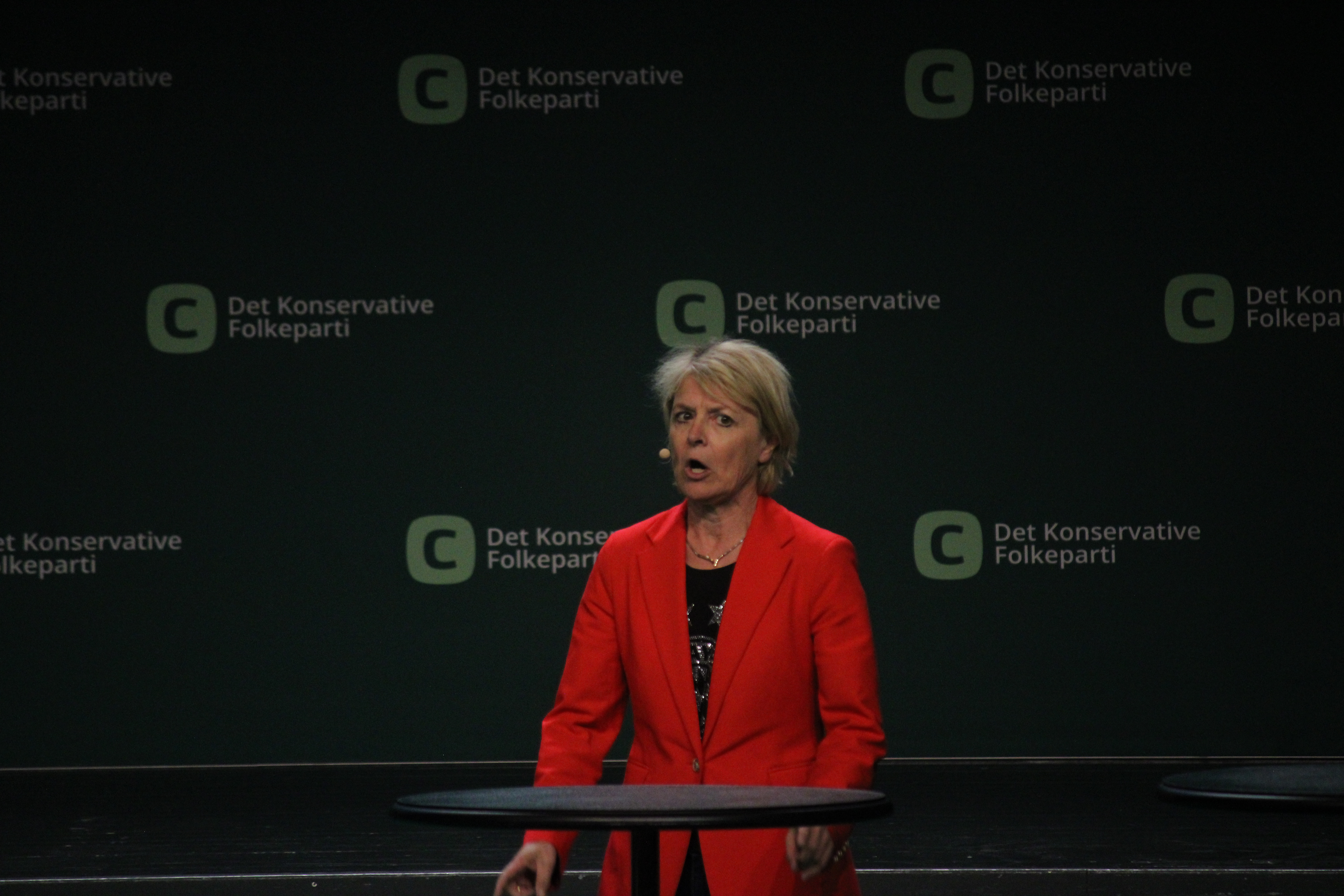
Lykke Friis til De Konservatives ekstraordinære landsråd i april 2024

Friis has contributed to newspapers, radio, TV, and seminars on EU-related issues, and has written a number of articles and books and such subjects. Her ability to make the EU material accessible secured her the DR Rosenkjærprisen in 2008.

== Other activities ==
=== Corporate boards ===
- Vestas, Member of the Board of Directors (2014-2018)

=== Non-profit organizations ===
- Danish Foreign Policy Society, Chairwoman of the Board of Directors
- Rockwool Fonden, Member of the Board of Directors
- European Council on Foreign Relations (ECFR), Co-chair (since 2019)
- Trilateral Commission, Member of the European Group
- International Crisis Group (ICG), Board of Trustees (since 2012)

== Personal life ==
Friis is known as a connoisseur of German football and is a fan of FC Bayern Munich.

== Notes ==
Political offices
Preceded by Connie Hedegaard	Minister for Climate and Energy	Succeeded by Martin Lidegaard and Ida Auken
Preceded by Inger Støjberg	Minister for Equal Rights	Succeeded by Manu Sareen
