= Mogens Jensen (politician) =

Danish politician (born 1963)

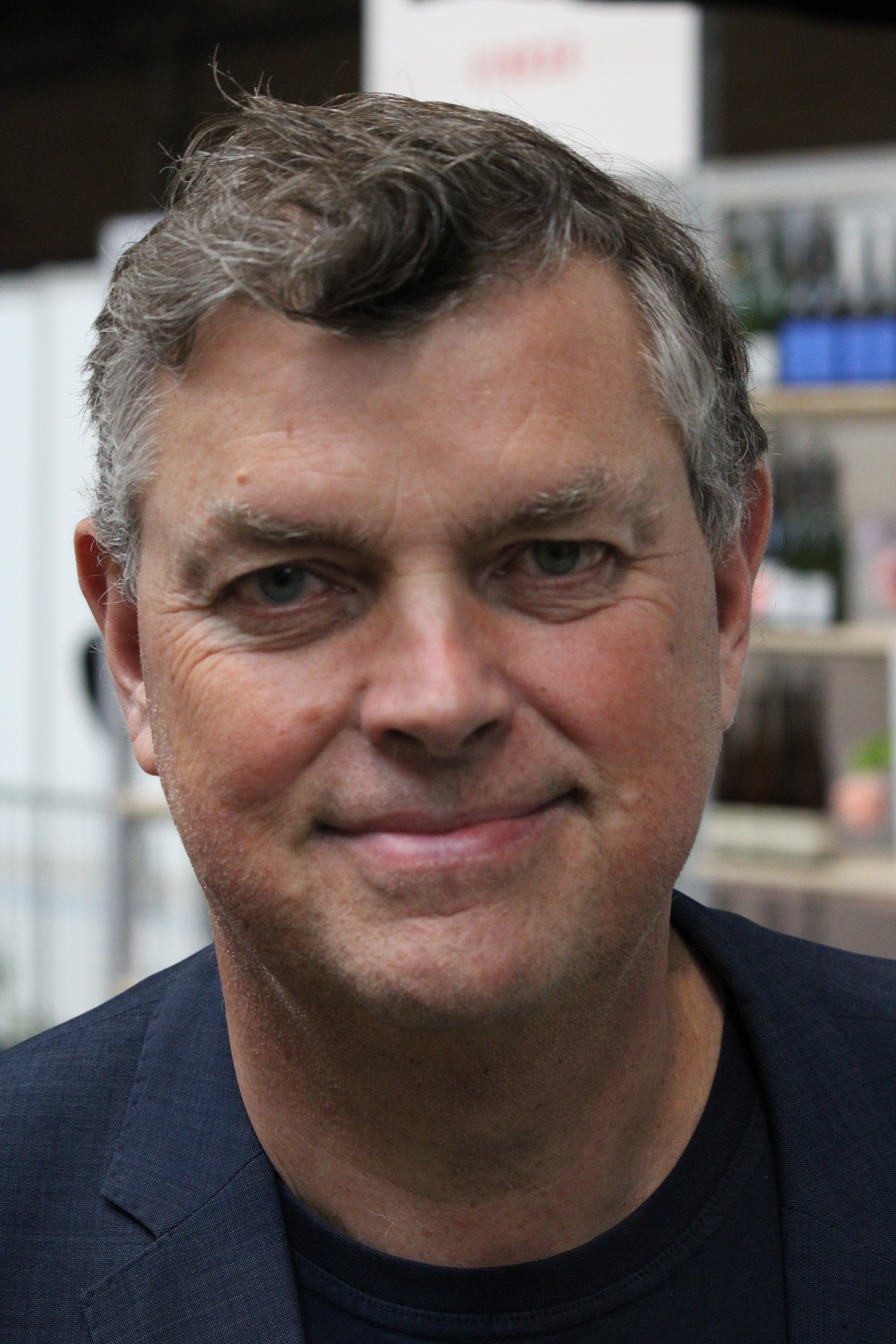
- Jensen in 2025

Minister for Food, Fishery & Gender Equality and Minister for Nordic Cooperation
- In office 27 June 2019 – 18 November 2020
- Prime Minister: Mette Frederiksen

Minister for Trade and Development Cooperation
- In office 21 November 2013 – 2 February 2014
- Prime Minister: Helle Thorning-Schmidt

Member of the Folketing
- Incumbent
- Assumed office 8 February 2005
- Constituency: West Jutland (from 2007); Ringkøbing (2005–2007)

Personal details
- Born: 31 October 1963 (age 62) Nykøbing Mors, Denmark
- Party: Social Democrats

Mogens Jensen (born 31 October 1963) is a Danish politician, who is a member of the Folketing for the Social Democrats political party. He served as the Minister for Food, Agriculture and Fisheries, Minister for Gender Equality, and Minister for Nordic Cooperation from 2019 to November 2020, when he was forced to resign following a botched handling of Cluster 5 resulting in an order to cull the mink population during the COVID-19 pandemic in Denmark.

== Political career ==
Jensen was elected member of Folketinget for the Social Democrats in the 2005 Danish general election. In the government of Prime Minister Helle Thorning-Schmidt, Jensen served as Minister for Trade and Development Cooperation from 2013 until 2014. In response to the introduction of an Ugandan law imposing harsh penalties for homosexuality in 2014, he led Denmark's move to divert 50 million crowns ($9 million) of development aid away from the Ugandan government. Also, under his leadership, Denmark joined the Asian Infrastructure Investment Bank (AIIB) in 2015.

Jensen was appointed Minister for Food, Agriculture and Fisheries, Minister for Gender Equality and Minister for Nordic Cooperation in the Frederiksen Cabinet from 27 June 2019. He saw himself forced to resign as minister on 18 November 2020 due to the mishandling of a case, where – in an attempt to prevent harmful coronavirus mutations in the mink population – the Danish mink fur industry had been ordered by the Danish Veterinary and Food Administration to cull the entire Danish mink population without proper legal provision.

In addition to his role in parliament, Jensen served as member of the Danish delegation to the Parliamentary Assembly of the Council of Europe from 2008 until 2019. He has in the past served as the Assembly's rapporteur on sports governance (2018).

== Personal life ==
Jensen was born in Nykøbing Mors to Harry Jensen and Ebba Møller Jensen. He is openly gay. On 7 March 2023, he publicly expressed his intention to marry his through five years boyfriend Markus Hjortshøj.

Political offices
Preceded by Nick Hækkerup	Minister for Trade; 2014–2015	Succeeded by Position abolished
Preceded by Rasmus Helveg Petersen	Minister for Development Cooperation; 2014–2015	Succeeded by Ulla Tørnæs
Preceded by Eva Kjer Hansen	Minister for Nordic Cooperation; 2019–2020	Succeeded by Flemming Møller Mortensen
Preceded by Eva Kjer Hansen	Minister for Gender Equality; 2019–2020	Succeeded by Peter Hummelgaard Thomsen
Preceded by Eva Kjer Hansen	Minister for Food, Agriculture and Fisheries; 2019–2020	Succeeded by Rasmus Prehn
