= Lars Løkke Rasmussen II Cabinet =

Danish government cabinet 2015–2016

Second cabinet of Lars Løkke Rasmussen
- 76th Cabinet of Denmark

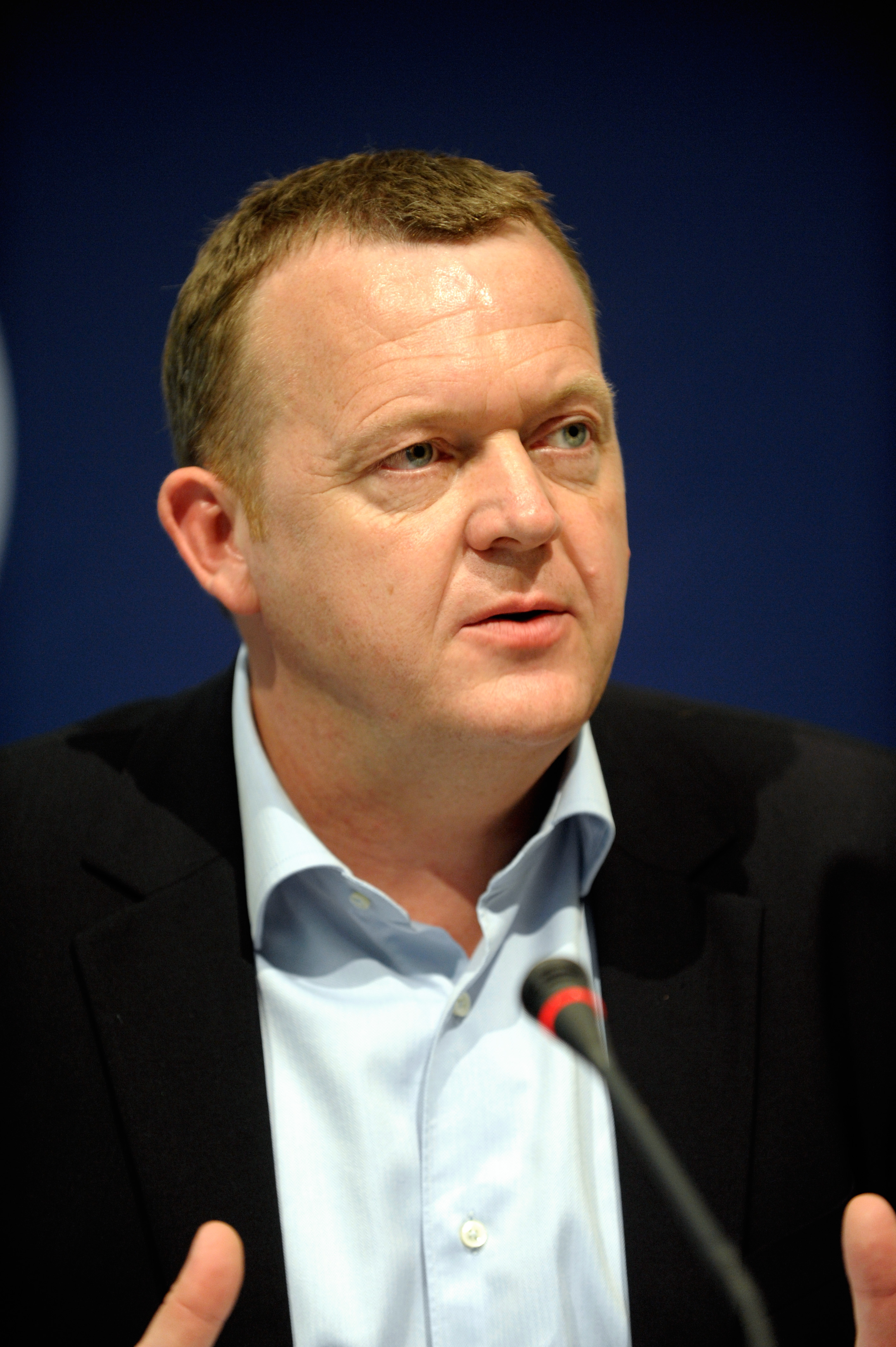
- Date formed: 28 June 2015
- Date dissolved: 28 November 2016

People and organisations
- Head of state: Margrethe II of Denmark
- Head of government: Lars Løkke Rasmussen
- Member parties: Venstre; Supported by: Danish People's Party; Liberal Alliance; Conservatives
- Status in legislature: Minority government
- Opposition party: Social Democrats; Red-Green Alliance; Alternative; Social Liberals; Green Left

History
- Election: 2015 general election
- Legislature term: 2015–2019
- Predecessor: Thorning-Schmidt Cabinet II
- Successor: Løkke Rasmussen III

The Second cabinet of Lars Løkke Rasmussen was the Government of Denmark, in office between 28 June 2015 and 28 November 2016, when Lars Løkke Rasmussen third cabinet took over.

It was a single-party minority government consisting of Venstre, the first of this kind since Anker Jørgensen V Cabinet in 1981–82. It was supported by the Danish People's Party, the Liberal Alliance and the Conservative People's Party.

== List of ministers ==
Portfolio	Minister	Took office	Left office	Party
Prime Minister's Office
Prime Minister	Lars Løkke Rasmussen	28 June 2015	28 November 2016	Venstre
Minister of Foreign Affairs	Kristian Jensen	28 June 2015	28 November 2016	Venstre
Minister of Finance	Claus Hjort Frederiksen	28 June 2015	28 November 2016	Venstre
Minister of Culture and Minister of Ecclesiastical Affairs	Bertel Haarder	28 June 2015	28 November 2016	Venstre
Minister of Business Affairs and Growth	Troels Lund Poulsen	28 June 2015	28 November 2016	Venstre
Minister of the Environment and Food	Eva Kjer Hansen	28 June 2015	27 February 2016	Venstre
Minister of the Environment and Food	Esben Lunde Larsen	29 February 2016	28 November 2016	Venstre
Minister of Transport and Construction	Hans Christian Schmidt	28 June 2015	28 November 2016	Venstre
Minister of Foreigners, Integration and Housing	Inger Støjberg	28 June 2015	28 November 2016	Venstre
Minister of the Interior and Social Affairs	Karen Ellemann	28 June 2015	28 November 2016	Venstre
Minister of Justice	Søren Pind	28 June 2015	28 November 2016	Venstre
Minister of Energy, Utilities and Climate	Lars Christian Lilleholt	28 June 2015	28 November 2016	Venstre
Minister of Children, Education and Gender Equality	Ellen Trane Nørby	28 June 2015	28 November 2016	Venstre
Minister of Health and Elderly Affairs	Sophie Løhde	28 June 2015	28 November 2016	Venstre
Minister of Taxation	Karsten Lauritzen	28 June 2015	28 November 2016	Venstre
Minister of Higher Education and Science	Esben Lunde Larsen	28 June 2015	29 February 2016	Venstre
Minister of Higher Education and Science	Ulla Tørnæs	29 February 2016	28 November 2016	Venstre
Minister of Defence	Carl Holst	28 June 2015	30 September 2015	Venstre
Minister of Defence	Peter Christensen	30 September 2015	28 November 2016	Venstre
Minister of Employment	Jørn Neergaard Larsen	28 June 2015	28 November 2016	Venstre

Preceded by Thorning-Schmidt II	Cabinet of Denmark; 2015–2016	Succeeded by Løkke Rasmussen III
