= Rønshoved højskole =

Coordinates: 54°52′24″N 9°31′08″E

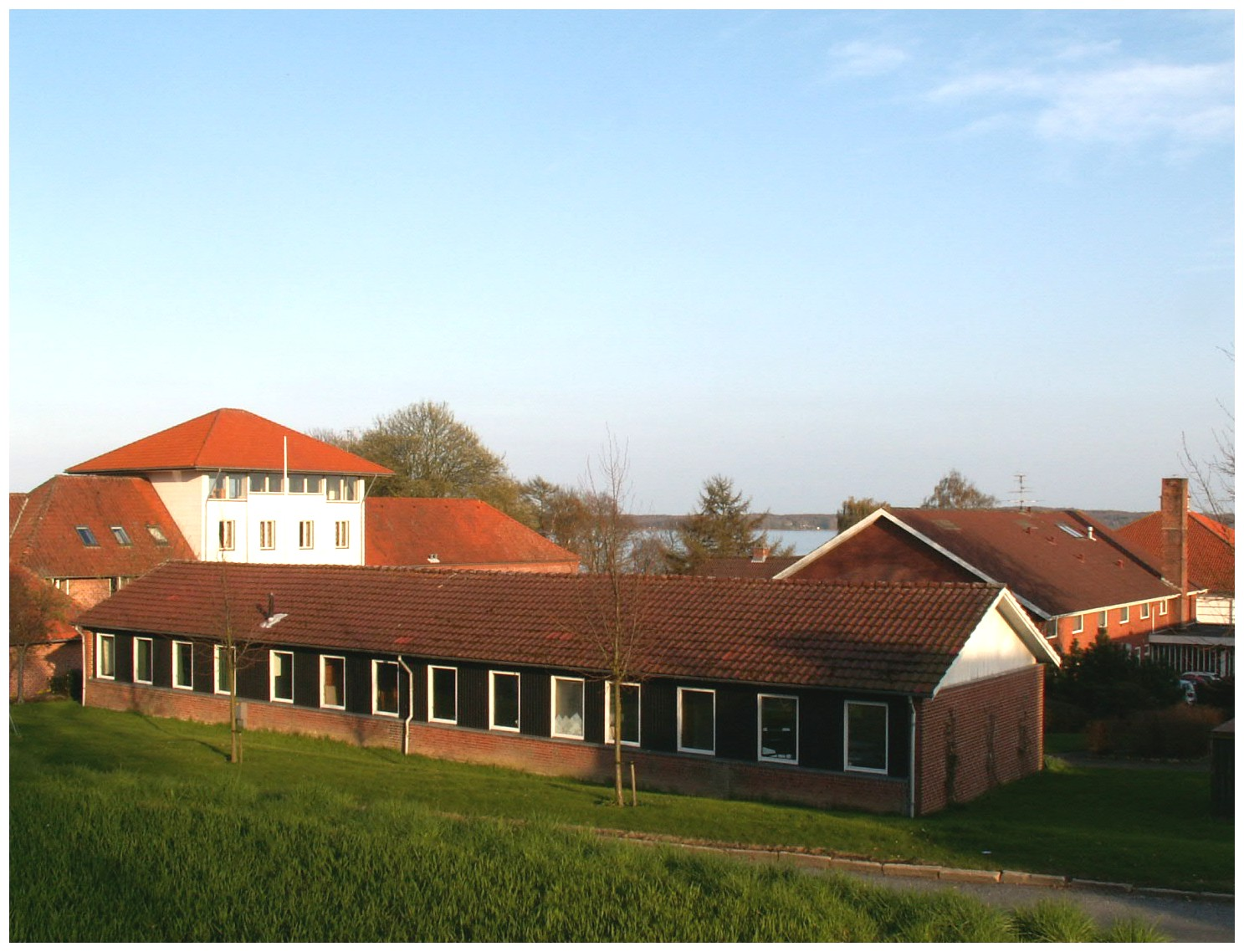
Ronshoved

Rønshoved High School (Danish: Rønshoved Højskole) is a folk high school (Danish: Højskole) in southern Denmark on the northern banks of Flensburg Firth. It was founded in 1921 by its first headmaster, Aage Møller, who was inspired by the Danish philosopher and pastor N. F. S. Grundtvig. The school is general in the sense that it is not specialized but it offers a wide variety of intellectual subjects (history, religion, philosophy, literature, psychology, etc.), creative subjects (music, arts, writing, etc.), languages (Danish, English, German, French, Latin, and Hebrew), and sports (volleyball, badminton, kayaking, mountain biking, etc.). The classes are open to foreigners as well as to Danish students.

The short courses (1–2 weeks) are only held in Danish, whereas the long courses are held in Danish and/or English.

The Danish minister of culture and ecclesiastical affairs since 2015, Bertel Haarder, was born and grew up at Rønshoved High School.

== Headmasters since 1921 ==
- 1921–1941 Aage Møller (1885–1978)
- 1941–1967 Hans Haarder (1905–1990)
- 1967–1979 Hans and Oscar Haarder
- 1979–1987 Oscar Haarder (1932–2011)
- 1987–1996 Laurits Kjær-Nielsen (1936–2009)
- 1996–2001 Erik Lindsø (1954)
- 2001–present Nina (1962) and Thue Kjærhus (1954)

== Sources ==
- Rønshoved Højskoles årsskrifter
- Fædre og arv, Et tilbageblik med bidrag til den nødvendige samtale om højskolens nutid og fremtid – Rønshoved Højskole 1921-1996, Rønshoved Højskole, 1996.
- Poul Engberg, Nordens højskoler – perspektiver og aktualiteter, Kirkeligt Samfunds forlag, 1948
- Erica Simon, Réveil national et culture populaire en Scandinavie, 1960

== See also ==
- Folk High School
- Nikolai Frederik Severin Grundtvig
