= Jens Kampmann =

Danish politician (1937–2026)

Minister of Taxes and Duties
- In office 26 February 1977 – 30 August 1978
- Preceded by: Svend Jakobsen
- Succeeded by: Anders Ejnar Andersen

Minister of Public Works
- In office 11 October 1971 – 19 December 1973
- Preceded by: Ove Guldberg
- Succeeded by: Kresten Damsgaard

Minister of Public Works and Pollution Control
- In office 11 October 1971 – 27 September 1973
- Preceded by: position established
- Succeeded by: Helge Nielsen

Member of the Folketing
- In office 22 November 1966 – 5 October 1978
- Constituency: Skanderborg County constituency Århus County constituency (1970–1978)

Personal details
- Born: 30 March 1937 Frederiksberg, Denmark
- Died: May 2026 (aged 89)
- Party: S
- Education: University of Copenhagen (Cand.polit.)
- Occupation: Civil servant

Jens Kampmann (30 March 1937 – May 2026) was a Danish politician. A member of the Social Democrats, he served in the Folketing from 1966 to 1978 and was Minister of Public Works and Pollution Control from 1971 to 1973 and Minister of Taxes and Duties from 1977 to 1978.

Kampmann died in May 2026, at the age of 89.
