= Eva Kjer Hansen =

Danish politician (born 1964)

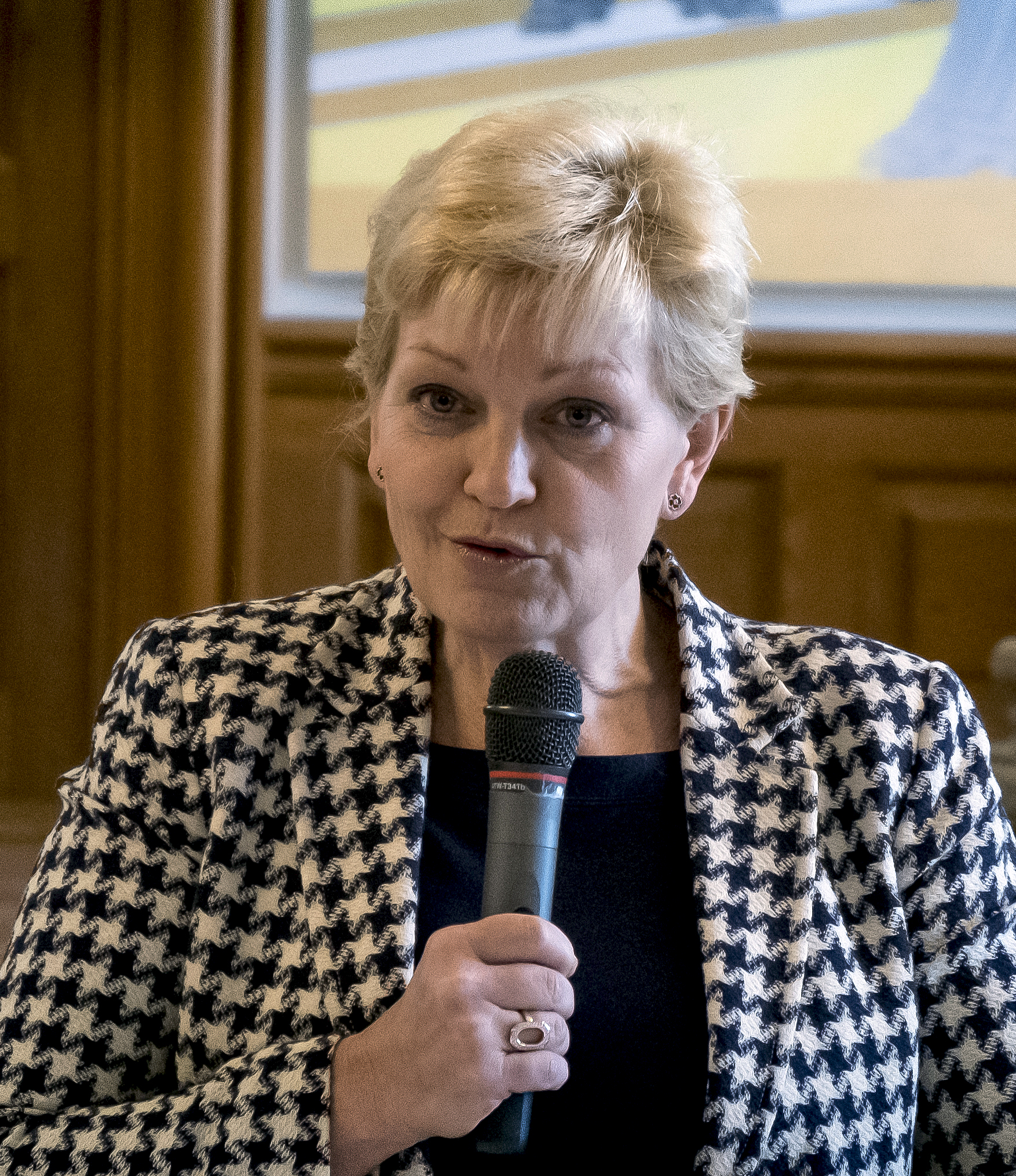

Member of the Folketing
- In office 12 December 1990 – 1 November 2022
- Constituency: South Jutland (from 2007); Vejle (1990–2007)

Minister of Fisheries, Equality and Nordic Cooperation
- In office 2 May 2018 – 27 June 2019
- Prime Minister: Lars Løkke Rasmussen
- Preceded by: Karen Ellemann
- Succeeded by: Mogens Jensen

Minister of the Environment and Food
- In office 28 June 2015 – 29 February 2016
- Prime Minister: Lars Løkke Rasmussen
- Preceded by: Dan Jørgensen
- Succeeded by: Esben Lunde Larsen

Minister of Food, Agriculture and Fisheries
- In office 12 September 2007 – 23 February 2010
- Prime Minister: Anders Fogh Rasmussen; Lars Løkke Rasmussen
- Preceded by: Hans Christian Schmidt
- Succeeded by: Henrik Høegh

Minister of Social Affairs and Equality
- In office 2 August 2004 – 12 September 2007
- Prime Minister: Anders Fogh Rasmussen

Personal details
- Born: 22 August 1964 (age 61) Aabenraa, Denmark
- Party: Venstre

Eva Kjer Hansen (born 26 August 1964) is a Danish former politician, who was a member of the Folketing for the Venstre political party. She held many ministerial positions, the last being as minister of Fisheries, Gender Equality and Nordic Cooperation from 2 May 2018 to 27 June 2019. Hansen was a member of parliament from the 1990 Danish general election to the 2022 Danish general election where she was not re-elected.

== Political career ==
She was the Danish Minister for Food, Agriculture and Fisheries as member of the Cabinet of Anders Fogh Rasmussen II, III and the Lars Løkke Rasmussen I Cabinet from 12 September 2007 until 23 February 2010, and she was Minister of Social Affairs and Minister for Women's Rights from 2 August 2004 to 12 September 2007, as member of the Cabinet of Anders Fogh Rasmussen I and II. As part of the Lars Løkke Rasmussen II Cabinet she was Minister for Food, Agriculture and Fisheries from 28 June 2015 until 29 February 2016. She was Minister for Gender Equality, Fisheries and Nordic Cooperation from 2 May 2018 to 27 June 2019. After the 2019 election Venstre became the opposition to the new Social Democrats government, and Hansen lost her position as minister. Having lost her seat in the Folketing following the 2022 Danish general election, Hansen quit politics, including resigning from her position as councilor in Kolding Municipality. Hansen intends to find a new job.

Political offices
Preceded by Henriette Kjær	Minister of Social Affairs and Gender Equality; 2004 – 2007	Succeeded by Karen Jespersen
Preceded by Hans Christian Schmidt	Minister for Food, Agriculture and Fisheries of Denmark; 2007 – 2010	Succeeded by Henrik Høegh
Preceded by Dan Jørgensen	Minister for the Environment; 2015 – 2016	Succeeded by Esben Lunde Larsen
Preceded by Kirsten Brosbøl	Minister for Food; 2015 – 2016	Succeeded by Esben Lunde Larsen
Preceded by Esben Lunde Larsen	Minister for Fisheries; 2018 – 2019	Succeeded by Mogens Jensen
Preceded by Karen Ellemann	Minister for Gender Equality and Nordic Cooperation; 2018 – 2019	Succeeded by Mogens Jensen
