= Minister for Gender Equality (Denmark) =

Danish cabinet position

Minister of Gender Equality
- Ligestillingsminister
- State coat of arms of the Kingdom of Denmark

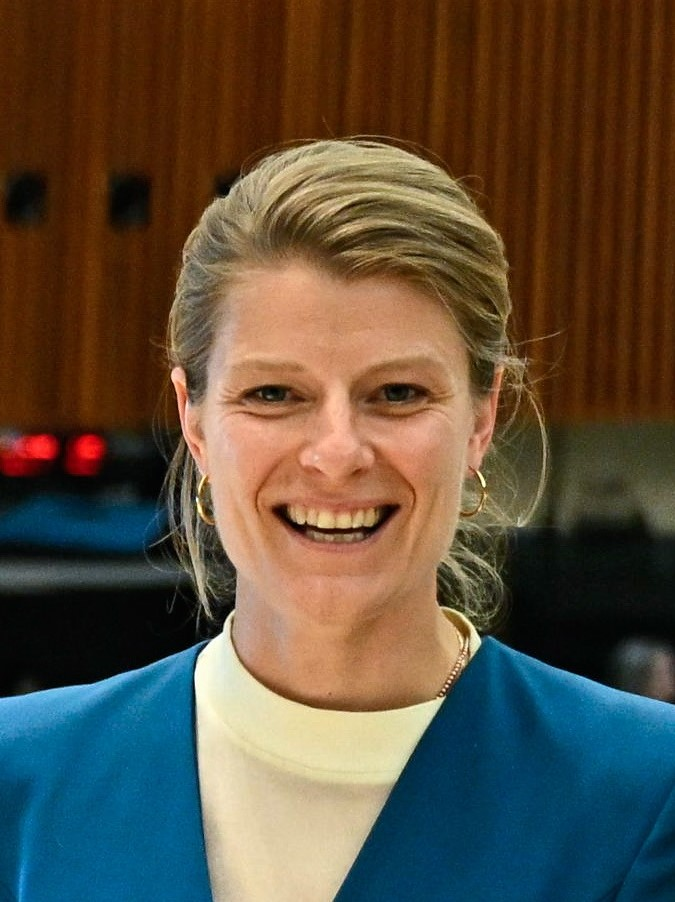
- Incumbent; Ane Halsboe-Jørgensen since 3 June 2026
- Ministry of Environment and Gender Equality
- Type: Minister
- Member of: Cabinet; State Council
- Reports to: the Prime minister
- Seat: Slotsholmen
- Appointer: The Monarch (on the advice of the Prime Minister)
- Formation: 27 September 1999; 26 years ago
- First holder: Jytte Andersen
- Succession: depending on the order in the State Council
- Deputy: Permanent Secretary
- Salary: 1.624.503,02 DKK (€217,931), in 2026

The Minister for Gender Equality (Danish: Ligestillingsminister) is a Danish minister that works on improving equal gender rights. The first Minister for Gender Equality was appointed on 1 July 1999.

Every minister has held this title alongside another title. Jytte Andersen and Lotte Bundsgaard were also city and housing ministers. Henriette Kjær, Eva Kjer Hansen were social ministers. Karen Jespersen was also Social Minister, later welfare minister. Inger Støjberg was also employment minister and Lykke Friis was also climate minister. Manu Sareen, the first male Minister for Gender Equality, was also Church and Minister for Nordic Cooperation, and Ellen Trane Nørby were also Education minister. Marie Bjerre was also Minister for Digitalization. Ane Halsboe-Jørgensen is also Minister for Employment.

== List of ministers ==
No.	Portrait	Name (born-died)	Term of office			Political party	Government	Ref.
No.	Portrait	Name (born-died)	Took office	Left office	Time in office	Political party	Government	Ref.
Minister for Gender Equality (Minister for ligestilling)
1		Jytte Andersen (born 1942)	27 September 1999	21 December 2000	1 year, 85 days	Social Democrats	P. N. Rasmussen III–IV	
2		Lotte Bundsgaard (born 1973)	21 December 2000	27 November 2001	341 days	Social Democrats	P. N. Rasmussen IV	
3		Henriette Kjær (born 1966)	27 November 2001	2 August 2004	2 years, 249 days	Conservative	A. F. Rasmussen I	
4		Eva Kjer Hansen (born 1964)	2 August 2004	12 September 2007	3 years, 41 days	Venstre	A. F. Rasmussen I–II	
5		Karen Jespersen (born 1947)	12 September 2007	7 April 2009	1 year, 207 days	Venstre	A. F. Rasmussen II–III; L. L. Rasmussen I	
6		Inger Støjberg (born 1973)	7 April 2009	23 February 2010	322 days	Venstre	L. L. Rasmussen I	
7		Lykke Friis (born 1969)	23 February 2010	3 October 2011	1 year, 222 days	Venstre	L. L. Rasmussen I	
8		Manu Sareen (born 1967)	3 October 2011	28 June 2015	3 years, 268 days	Social Liberals	Thorning-Schmidt I–II	
9		Ellen Trane Nørby (born 1980)	28 June 2015	28 November 2016	1 year, 153 days	Venstre	L. L. Rasmussen II	
Minister for Fisheries, and Gender Equality (Minister for fiskeri og ligestilling)
10		Karen Ellemann (born 1969)	28 November 2016	2 May 2018	1 year, 155 days	Venstre	L. L. Rasmussen III	
(4)		Eva Kjer Hansen (born 1964)	2 May 2018	27 June 2019	1 year, 56 days	Venstre	L. L. Rasmussen III	
Minister for Food, Fisheries, and Gender Equality (Minister for fødevarer, fiskeri og ligestilling)
11		Mogens Jensen (born 1963)	27 June 2019	18 November 2020	1 year, 144 days	Social Democrats	Frederiksen I	
Minister for Gender Equality (Minister for ligestilling)
12		Peter Hummelgaard Thomsen (born 1983)	18 November 2020	4 February 2022	1 year, 78 days	Social Democrats	Frederiksen I	
13		Trine Bramsen (born 1981)	4 February 2022	15 December 2022	314 days	Social Democrats	Frederiksen I	
14		Marie Bjerre (born 1986)	15 December 2022	23 November 2023	343 days	Venstre	Frederiksen II	
15		Mia Wagner (born 1977)	23 November 2023	7 December 2023	14 days	Venstre	Frederiksen II	
(14)		Marie Bjerre (born 1986)	7 December 2023	29 August 2024	266 days	Venstre	Frederiksen II	
16		Magnus Heunicke (born 1981)	29 August 2024	3 June 2026	1 year, 278 days	Social Democrats	Frederiksen II	
17		Ane Halsboe-Jørgensen (born 1983)	3 June 2026	Incumbent	96 days	Social Democrats	Frederiksen III	
