= Bertel Haarder =

Danish politician

Bertel Geismar Haarder
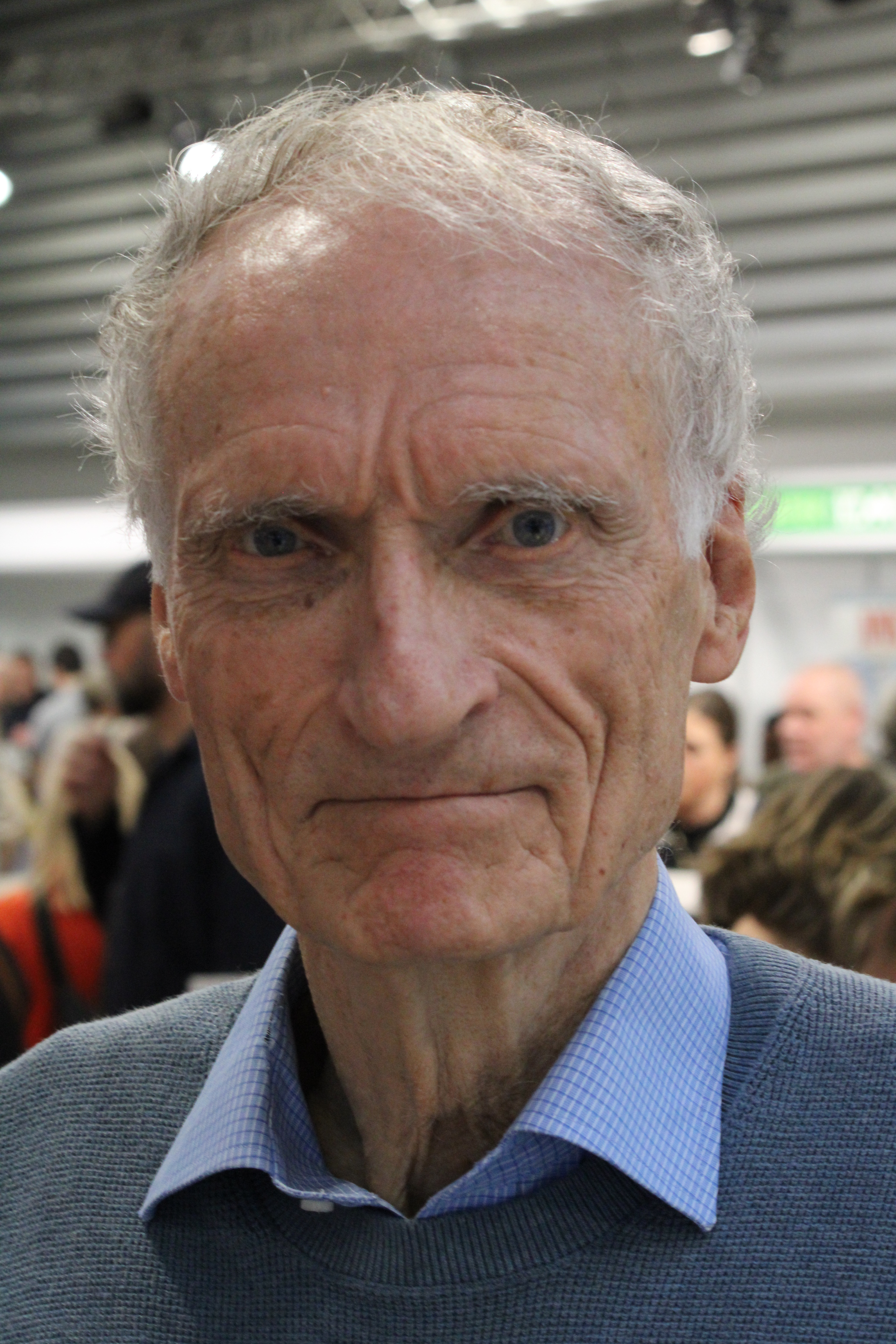
- Haarder in 2025

Minister of Education
- In office 10 September 1982 – 25 January 1993
- Prime Minister: Poul Schlüter
- Preceded by: Dorte Bennedsen
- Succeeded by: Ole Vig Jensen

Minister for Refugees, Immigrants, Integration and European Affairs
- In office 27 November 2001 – 1 January 2003
- Prime Minister: Anders Fogh Rasmussen

Minister for Refugees, Immigrants and Integration
- In office 1 January 2003 – 2 August 2004
- Prime Minister: Anders Fogh Rasmussen

Minister for Refugees, Immigrants, Integration and Development Cooperation
- In office 2 August 2004 – 18 February 2005
- Prime Minister: Anders Fogh Rasmussen

Minister of Education and Ecclesiastical Affairs
- In office 18 February 2005 – 23 November 2007
- Prime Minister: Anders Fogh Rasmussen

Minister of Education and Nordic Cooperation
- In office 18 February 2005 – 23 November 2007
- Prime Minister: Anders Fogh Rasmussen; Lars Løkke Rasmussen

Minister of the Interior and Health
- In office 23 February 2010 – 3 October 2011
- Prime Minister: Lars Løkke Rasmussen

Minister for Culture and Ecclesiastical Affairs
- In office 28 June 2015 – 28 November 2016
- Prime Minister: Lars Løkke Rasmussen

Member of the Folketing
- In office 8 February 2005 – 1 November 2022
- Constituency: Zealand (from 2011); Greater Copenhagen (2007-2011); Vestsjælland (2005-2007)
- In office 9 January 1975 – 30 September 1999
- Constituency: København (1977-1999); Nordjylland (1975-1977)

Member of the European Parliament for Denmark
- In office 1994–2001

President of Nordic Council
- In office 2011–2011
- In office 2020–2021

Personal details
- Born: 7 September 1944 (age 82) Rønshoved, Denmark
- Party: Venstre
- Education: Aarhus University

Bertel Geismar Haarder (born 7 September 1944) is a Danish writer, teacher and politician, who was a member of the Folketing for the Venstre political party. He has served as minister several times, including Minister of Education from 1982 to 1993 and again in 2005 to 2010, and most recently as Minister for Culture and Ecclesiastical Affairs from 2015 to 2016 in the L. L. Rasmussen II Cabinet. He is a former member of European Parliament, serving from 1994 to 2001. He has also served as president of the Nordic Council on two occasions, first in 2011 and latest from 2020 to 2021.

== Political career ==
Haarder was first elected to the Folketing (Parliament) in 1975. Until 1977 he was a member of the Folketing representing North Jutland County constituency, and from 1977 to 1999 he was a member of the Folketing from Copenhagen County constituency. From 2005 to 2007, he was a member from Vestsjælland County constituency, and since 2007 he has been a member from Greater Copenhagen constituency. He was also a Member of the European Parliament from 1994 to 2001, and he served as vice-chairman of the European Parliament from 1997 to 1999.

From 10 September 1982 to 25 January 1993 he was Education Minister in various cabinets of Poul Schlüter, during which he became involved in the mayonnaise war. From 10 September 1987 to 25 January 1993 he was also the Minister of Research.

From November 2001 to February 2005 he was Minister for Refugees, Immigrants and Integration in the Cabinet of Anders Fogh Rasmussen I, and enacted a policy of tough measures designed to limit the number of immigrants coming to Denmark. From February 2005 until February 2010 Haarder was once more the Education Minister in the Cabinet of Anders Fogh Rasmussen II. From February 2010 to October 2011 he was Interior and Health Minister in the Lars Løkke Rasmussen I Cabinet

Furthermore, from February 2005 to November 2007 he was minister for Ecclesiastical Affairs and from November 2007 until February 2010 the Minister of Nordic Cooperation in the Cabinet of Anders Fogh Rasmussen III. In February 2010 the veteran minister took over as Interior and Health Minister until October 2011. He is the longest serving Danish minister.

In 2021 Haarder announced he would not be standing at the 2022 Danish general election and subsequently lost his seat in the Folketing.

In 2026, Haarder wrote the foreword to Den usynlige ånd, a book by the leader of Liberal Alliance, Alex Vanopslagh. In that, he proposed that Venstre and Liberal Alliance should be merged into one party; however, he later stated that this would likely be impossible.

== Personal life ==
Haarder was born 7 September 1944 on Rønshoved højskole, son of Hans Haarder and Agnete Haarder. He graduated in political science from Aarhus University in 1970. From 1968 to 1973 he worked as a teacher on Askov Højskole. From 1971 to 1973 he worked as a teacher at Haderslev State Teacher Training College. From 1973 to 1975 he worked as a lecturer at Aalborg Teacher Training College.

== Bibliography ==
- Statskollektivisme og Spildproduktion (1973)
- Institutionernes Tyranni (1974)
- Den organiserede arbejdsløshed (1975)
- Danskerne år 2002 (1977)
- Midt i en klynketid (1980)
- Kampen om gymnasiet (1982, co-author)
- Ny-liberalismen – og dens rødder (1982, co-author)
- Grænser for politik (1990)
- Slip friheden løs (1990)
- Lille land, hvad nu? (1994)
- Den bløde kynisme (1997)
- Op mod strømmen - med højskolen i ryggen (2012)
- Bertels bedste - sange og fortællinger fra Borgen (2018)

== Honours and decorations ==
- Order of Merit of the Federal Republic of Germany, Grand Cross 1st Class
- Order of St. Olav, Grand Cross
- Order of the Polar Star, Commander 1st Class
- Order of the Falcon, Grand Cross
- Order of the Dannebrog, Grand Cross
- Grand Decoration of Honour in Gold with Star
- Order of the White Rose of Finland

Political offices
Preceded by Dorte Bennedsen	Minister of Education; 1982 — 1993	Succeeded by Ole Vig Jensen
Preceded by New office	Minister of Research; 1987 — 1993	Succeeded by Svend Bergstein
Preceded by New office	Minister for Refugees, Immigrants and Integration; 2001 — 2004	Succeeded by Rikke Hvilshøj
Preceded by New office	Minister for European Affairs; 2001 – 2003	Succeeded by Office abolished
Preceded by New office	Minister for Development Cooperation; 2004 — 2005	Succeeded by Ulla Tørnæs
Preceded by Ulla Tørnæs	Education Minister of Denmark; 2005 – 2010	Succeeded by Tina Nedergaard
Preceded by Tove Fergo	Minister for Ecclesiastical Affairs of Denmark; 2005 – 2007	Succeeded by Birthe Rønn Hornbech
Preceded by Connie Hedegaard	Minister of Nordic Cooperation; 2007 – 2010	Succeeded by Karen Ellemann
Preceded by Karen Ellemann	Minister of the Interior; 2010 – 2011	Succeeded by Margrethe Vestager
Preceded by Jakob Axel Nielsen	Minister of Health; 2010 – 2011	Succeeded by Astrid Krag
Preceded by Marianne Jelved	Minister for Culture and Ecclesiastical Affairs; 2015 – 2016	Succeeded by Mette Bock
