= Søren Pind =

Danish lawyer and politician

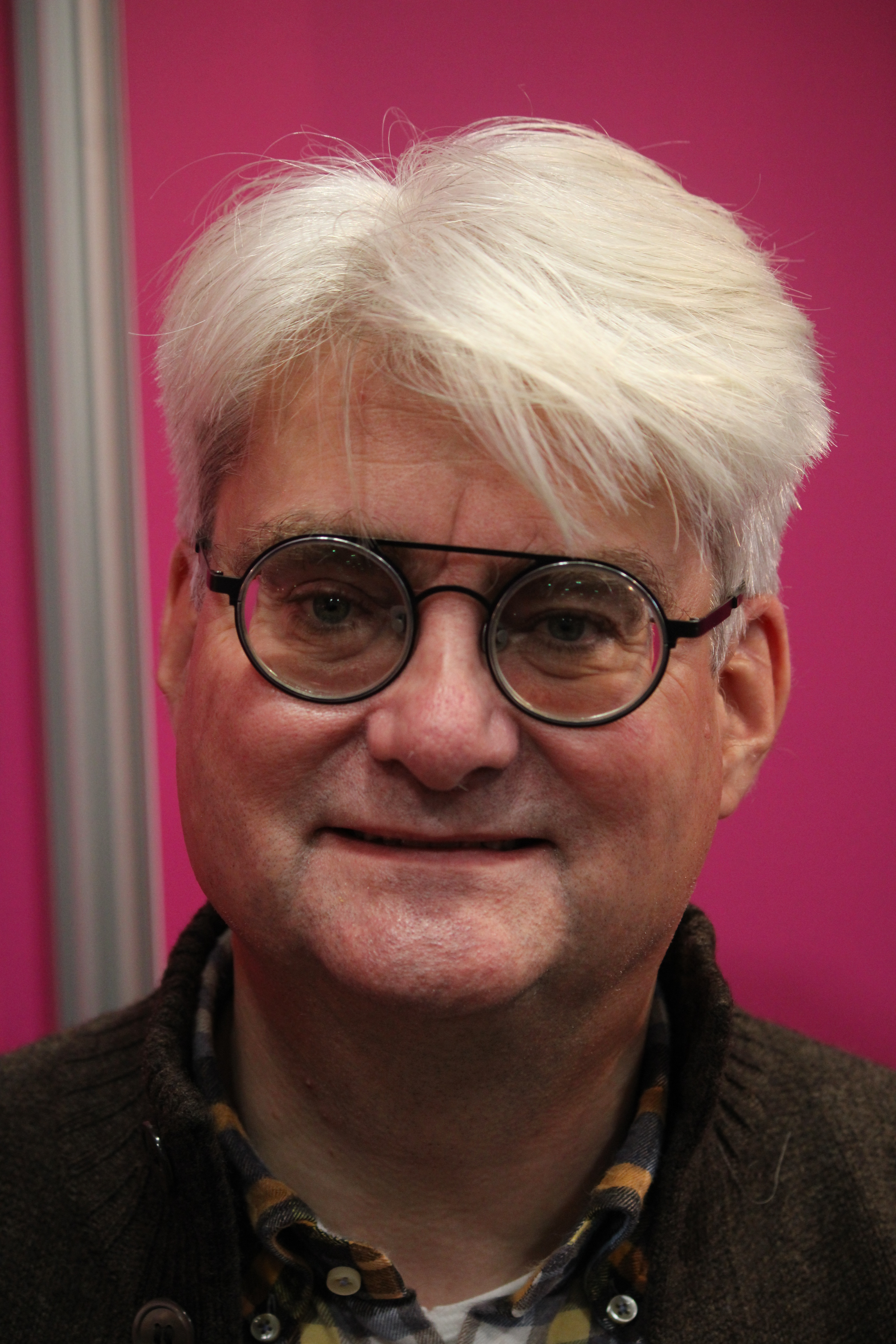
- Pind in 2025

Minister of Science, Technology, Information and Higher Education
- In office 28 November 2016 – 2 May 2018
- Prime Minister: Lars Løkke Rasmussen
- Preceded by: Ulla Tørnæs
- Succeeded by: Tommy Ahlers

Minister of Justice
- In office 28 June 2015 – 28 November 2016
- Prime Minister: Lars Løkke Rasmussen
- Preceded by: Mette Frederiksen
- Succeeded by: Søren Pape Poulsen

Minister for Refugees, Immigrants and Integration
- In office 8 March 2011 – 3 October 2011
- Prime Minister: Lars Løkke Rasmussen
- Preceded by: Birthe Rønn Hornbech
- Succeeded by: Position abolished

Minister of Development Cooperation
- In office 23 February 2010 – 3 October 2011
- Prime Minister: Lars Løkke Rasmussen
- Preceded by: Ulla Tørnæs
- Succeeded by: Christian Friis Bach

Personal details
- Born: 20 November 1969 (age 56) Herning, Denmark
- Party: Venstre
- Occupation: Politician
- Profession: Lawyer

Søren Pind (born 20 November 1969) is a Danish lawyer and former politician. He served as Danish Minister of Justice from 2015 to 2016, and as Minister of Science, Technology, Information and Higher Education from 2016 to May 2018, whereupon he retired from politics.

Pind was born in Herning. He served as councillor in the Copenhagen City Council from 1994 to 2005, and has taught at the University of Copenhagen.

Pind is considered more liberal than most other members of his party. In 2003, he was part of a group of party members who issued the "ten liberal theses", a document unsuccessfully challenging the direction the party was taking under Prime Minister Anders Fogh Rasmussen.

== Political career ==
He was appointed to the Lars Løkke Rasmussen I Cabinet during a cabinet reshuffle in February 2010, becoming Minister for Development Cooperation. He was appointed Minister for Refugees, Immigrants and Integration on 8 March 2011, thus holding double ministerial office.

Pind's first term as minister ended on 3 October 2011, after the center-left coalition prevailed in the 2011 parliamentary election.

On 28 June 2015 he was appointed as Minister of Justice in the Cabinet of Lars Løkke Rasmussen II.

On 28 November 2016 he was appointed as Minister of Science, Technology, Information and Higher Education in Prime Minister Lars Løkke Rasmussen's Cabinet III.

== Other activities ==
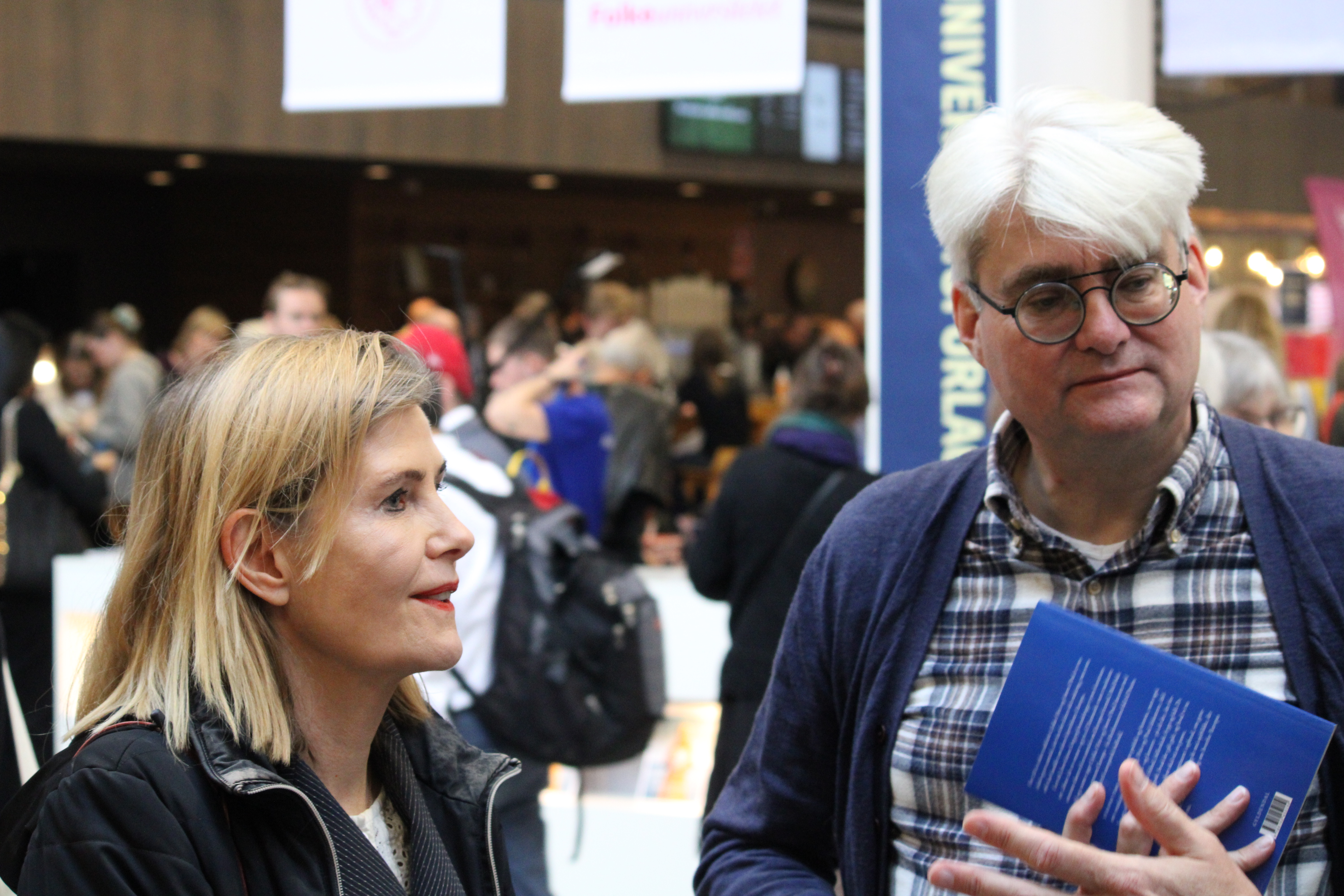
Pind with Anna Libak at Bogforum 2025

- European Council on Foreign Relations (ECFR), Member

== Honours and decorations ==
- Denmark : Commander (Kommandør) of the Order of the Dannebrog 17 March 2017.
- France : Chevalier (Knight) of the Legion of Honour on 12 March 2015.

Political offices
Preceded by Ulla Tørnæs	Minister for Development Cooperation of Denmark; 2010–2011	Succeeded by Christian Friis Bach
Preceded by Birthe Rønn Hornbech	Minister for Refugees, Immigrants and Integration; 2011–2011	Office abolished
Preceded by Mette Frederiksen	Justice Minister of Denmark; 2015–2016	Succeeded by Søren Pape Poulsen
Preceded by Ulla Tørnæs	Minister of Science, Technology, Information and Higher Education; 2016–2018	Succeeded by Tommy Ahlers
