= Hans Christian Schmidt =

Danish politician

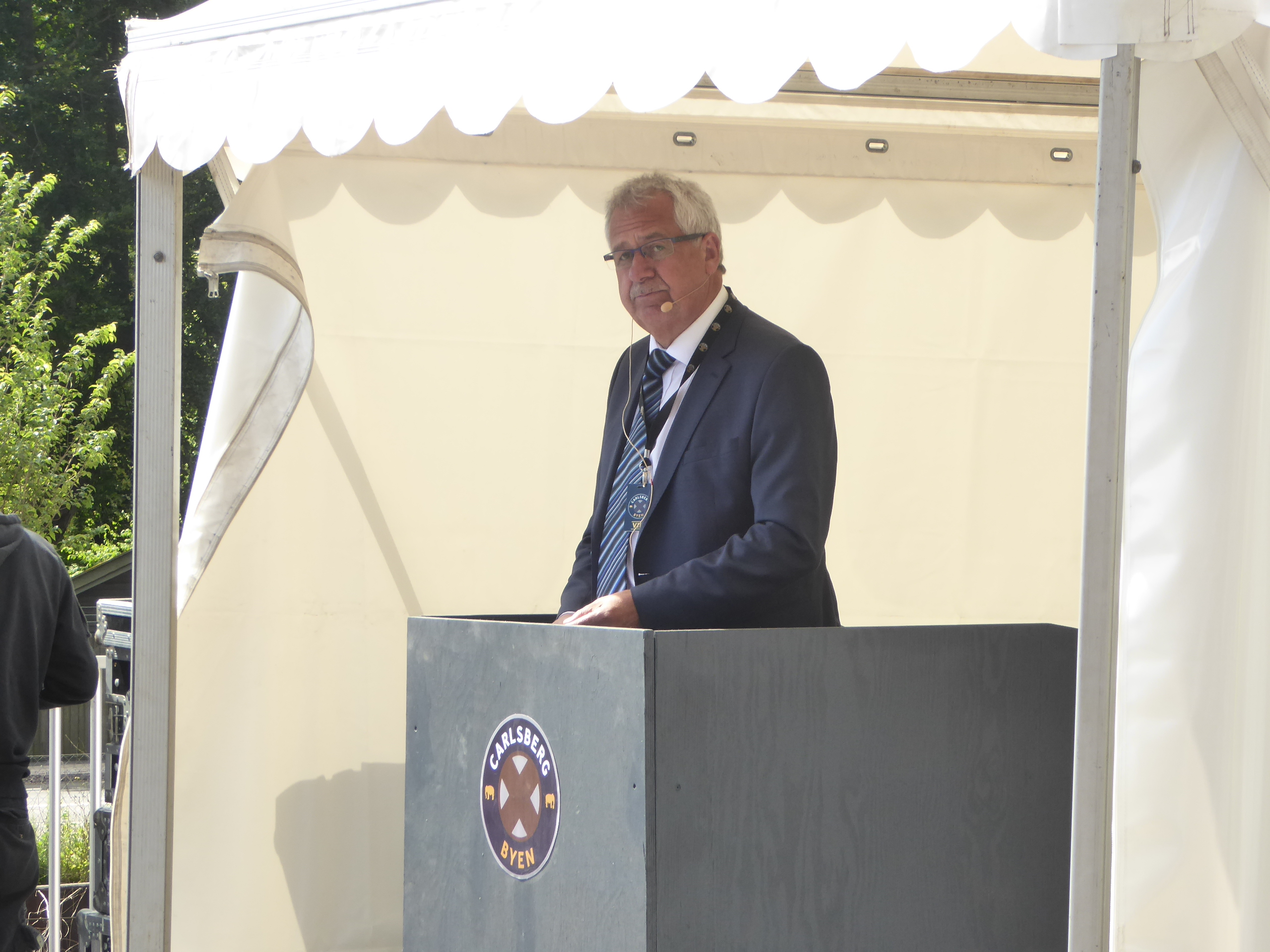
- Schmidt in 2016

Minister for the Environment
- In office 27 November 2001 – 2 August 2004

Minister for Food, Agriculture and Fisheries
- In office 2 August 2004 – 12 September 2007

Minister of Transport
- In office 23 February 2010 – 3 October 2011
- In office 28 June 2015 – 28 November 2016

Member of the Folketing
- Incumbent
- Assumed office 21 September 1994
- Constituency: South Jutland

Personal details
- Born: 25 August 1953 (age 72) Nustrup, Denmark
- Party: Venstre

Hans Christian Schmidt (born 25 August 1953) is a Danish politician, who is a member of the Folketing for the Venstre political party. He is a teacher by profession, and has served as Denmark's Minister of Transport from 2010 to 2011 and again from 2015 to 2016, as well as Minister for Food, Agriculture and Fisheries from 2004 to 2007, and Minister for the Environment from 2001 to 2004. He has been a member of parliament since the 1994 Danish general election.

== Background ==
Schmidt is the son of Holger and Ingrid Schmidt, who lived and worked on a farm. He was a school teacher in Vojens until 1984 before entering government. He is a longtime resident of the town of Vojens in Jutland.

== Political career ==
Schmidt was first elected into parliament in the 1994 election, and has been reelected in every election since. He has been a member of the municipal council of Vojens Municipality from 1982 to 2001, and served as deputy mayor from 1998 to 2001.

Political offices
Preceded by Svend Auken	Minister for the Environment; 2001—2004	Succeeded by Connie Hedegaard
Preceded by Mariann Fischer Boel	Minister of Food; 2004—2007	Succeeded by Eva Kjer Hansen
Preceded by Lars Barfoed	Minister of Transport; 2010—2011	Succeeded by Henrik Dam Kristensen
Preceded by Magnus Heunicke	Minister of Transport; 2015—2016	Succeeded by Ole Birk Olesen
