= Ministry of Food, Agriculture and Fisheries (Denmark) =

Danish Ministry

- Ministeriet for Fødevarer, Landbrug og Fiskeri
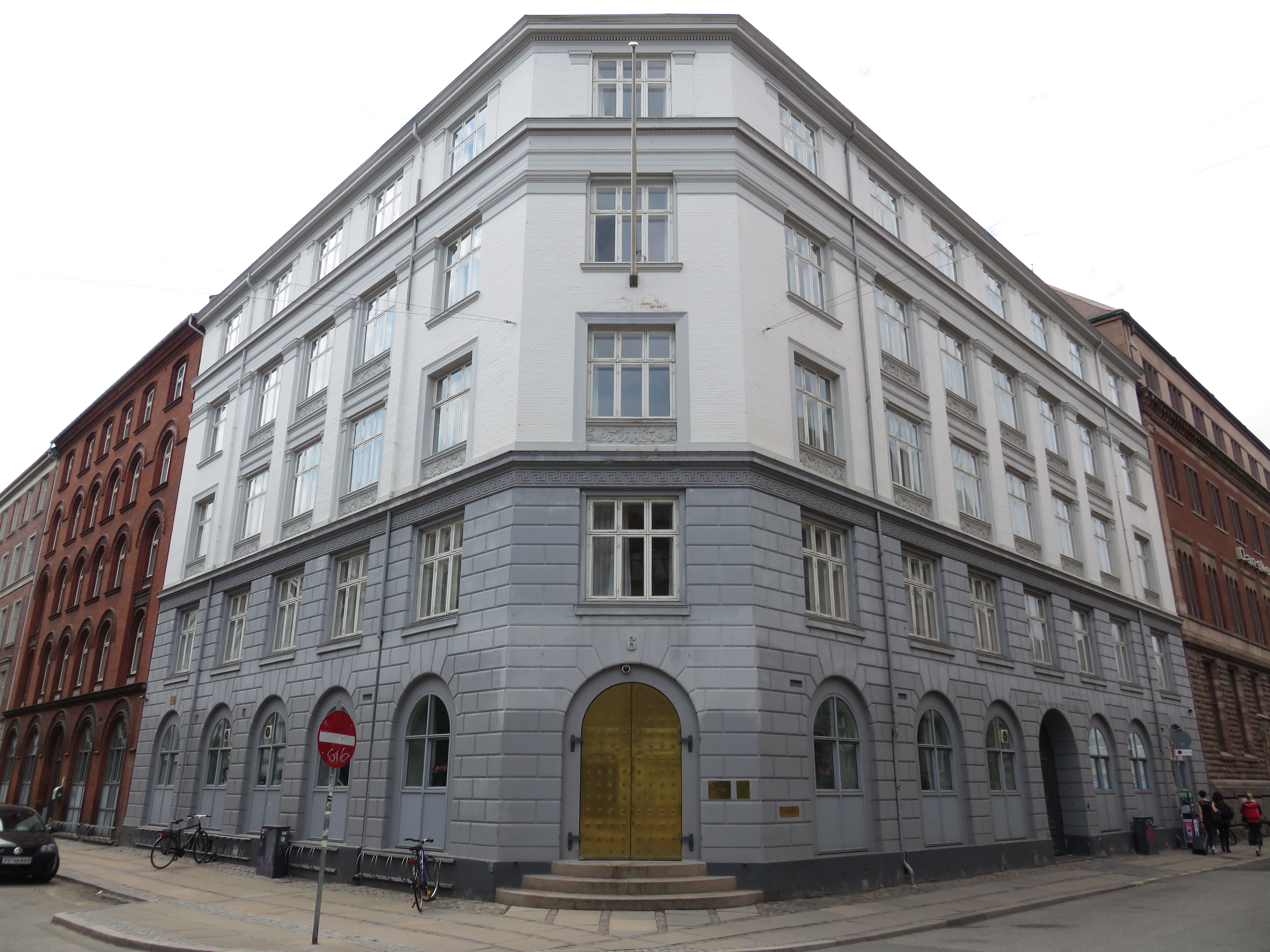
- Entrance to the ministry

Ministry overview
- Formed: 30 December 1996
- Dissolved: June 2026
- Headquarters: Holbergsgade 6; 1057 København K
- Employees: 3,000 (2025)
- Minister responsible: Jacob Jensen, Minister of Food, Agriculture and Fisheries
- Ministry executive: Henrik Kjærgaard, Permanent Secretary
- Child agencies: Agricultural Agency; Fisheries Agency; Veterinary and Food Administration
- Website: en.fvm.dk

The Ministry of Food, Agriculture and Fisheries (Danish: Ministeriet for Fødevarer, Landbrug og Fiskeri) is a Danish governmental ministry responsible for policy related to food production in Denmark. It oversees matters related to consumer protection, animal welfare, agricultural exportation, and investments in sustainable food production. The ministry is composed of one governing department and three agencies: the Danish Veterinary and Food Administration (Fødevarestyrelsen), The Danish Agricultural Agency (Landbrugsstyrelsen), and The Danish Fisheries Agency (Fiskeristyrelsen).

As of 2025, the ministry employs approximately 3000 people. Its politically appointed head serves as a member of the Cabinet. Since 15 December 2022, Jacob Jensen has served as Minister for Food, Agriculture and Fisheries in the Frederiksen II Cabinet.

== History ==
The ministry was created on 22 May 1896 and originally named the Ministry of Agriculture. Up until that point, agricultural and fishing policy was overseen by the Ministry of the Interior.

In 1929 the Directorate of Fishing was spun off into the separate Ministry of Shipping and Fishing, but was reabsorbed in 1935, and the name of the ministry was changed to Ministry of Agriculture and Fishing. In 1947 the Ministry of Fishing was created again, and the name of the ministry changed back to the Ministry of Agriculture, which lasted until 1994 when it was again folded into the Ministry of Agriculture and Fishing. On 30 December 1996 the name of the ministry was changed to the current Ministry of Food, Agriculture and Fisheries, often referred to simply as the Ministry of Food.

In 2015, the ministry was merged by the Lars Løkke Rasmussen II Cabinet with the Ministry of Environment to form the Ministry of Environment and Food. This merger was short-lived and the two ministries were again made independent on 19 November 2020.

In 2026, the ministry was dissolved by the Mette Frederiksen III Cabinet. Denmark's agricultural portfolio is set to be overtaken by five other ministries, including the newly-formed Ministry of Nature and Animal Welfare.
