= Manu Sareen =

Danish politician (born 1967)

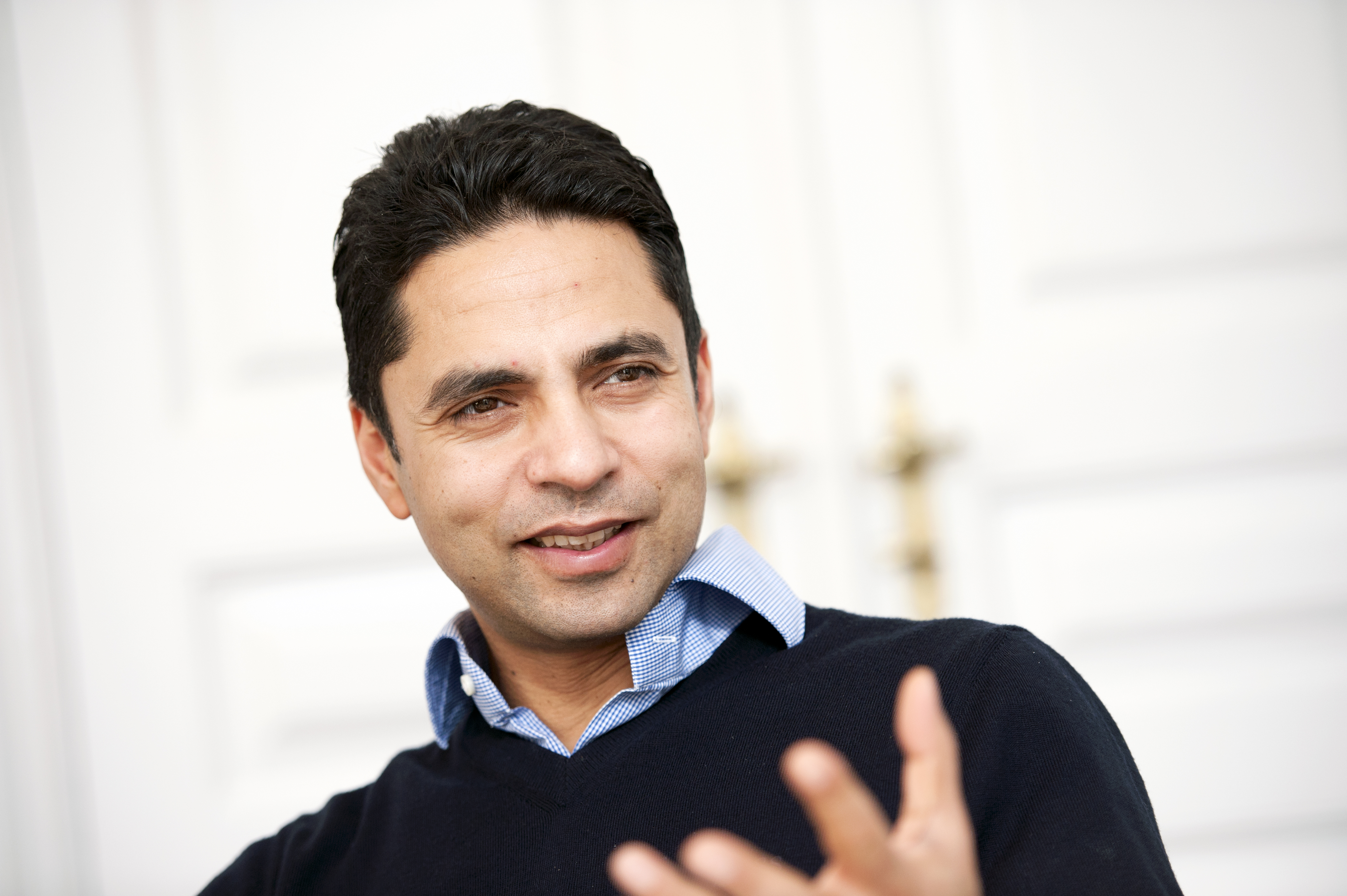
- Born: 16 May 1967 (age 59); India
- Occupations: formerly Minister for Children, Gender Equality, Integration and Social Affairs (Denmark)
- Years active: 2011-present
- Spouse: Anya Degn Sareen

Manu Sareen (born 16 May 1967) is the former Minister for Equality and former Church and Nordic Cooperation, in the Cabinet of Helle Thorning-Schmidt and former statsrevisor and member of the Copenhagen City Council, elected for the Danish Social Liberal Party.

== Life ==
Sareen was raised on Amager, where his family moved to from India in 1970. He is a trained social worker and mediator. He has been employed by the Hour Liaison/Ethnic consultant team since 1997, and has been affiliated with the City of Copenhagen as an ethnic consultant since 1999. He is also a lecturer and teacher, and has written several books, including a book about forced marriages. In 2006 he debuted as a children's book author, and in 2007 he published the second book in the series about Iqbal Farooq. Sareen was elected to the Copenhagen City Council in 2002 and became the group leader of the Danish Social Liberal Party in 2006. At the general election 2005 he was a candidate in Vesterbro district, and go the second-most votes in the Western constituency. He was thus the first alternate to MP Lone Dybkjær. In 2011 he was elected to parliament for the Nørrebro district. Manu Sareen was nominated for Politician of the Year in 2003, 2006 and 2007 by the National Association for Gays and Lesbians. On 3 October 2011 he was appointed the first male minister for equality.

Sareen is the first minister of Denmark with a non-European ethnic background. He is married to Anya Degn Sareen. The couple have three children.

== Bibliography ==
- When love becomes coercion - generational conflict and forced marriages (2003)
- Iqbal Farooq - and the black pierrot (2006)
- How to avoid dropout AZ (2006)
- Iqbal Farooq - and the crown jewels (2007)
- Iqbal Farooq - and the Indian super chip (2009)
- Clumsy Hassan (2011)

== External links and sources ==
- Manu Sareen website
- Autobiography on the website of the Danish Parliament (Folketinget)
- Vestager overturns gender, 02.10.2011, Ekstra Bladet
