= Esben Lunde Larsen =

Danish politician

Esben Lunde Larsen (born November 14, 1978) is a former Danish politician. He was a member of the Folketing (the Danish Parliament) for the Venstre party in the Ringkøbing district of the West Jutland constituency from the 2011 parliamentary election until October 1, 2018. From June 18, 2015, to January 29, 2016, he served as the Minister for Higher Education and Science. Afterward, he was the Minister for the Environment and Food until May 2, 2018, when he resigned as minister following involvement in several corruption cases.

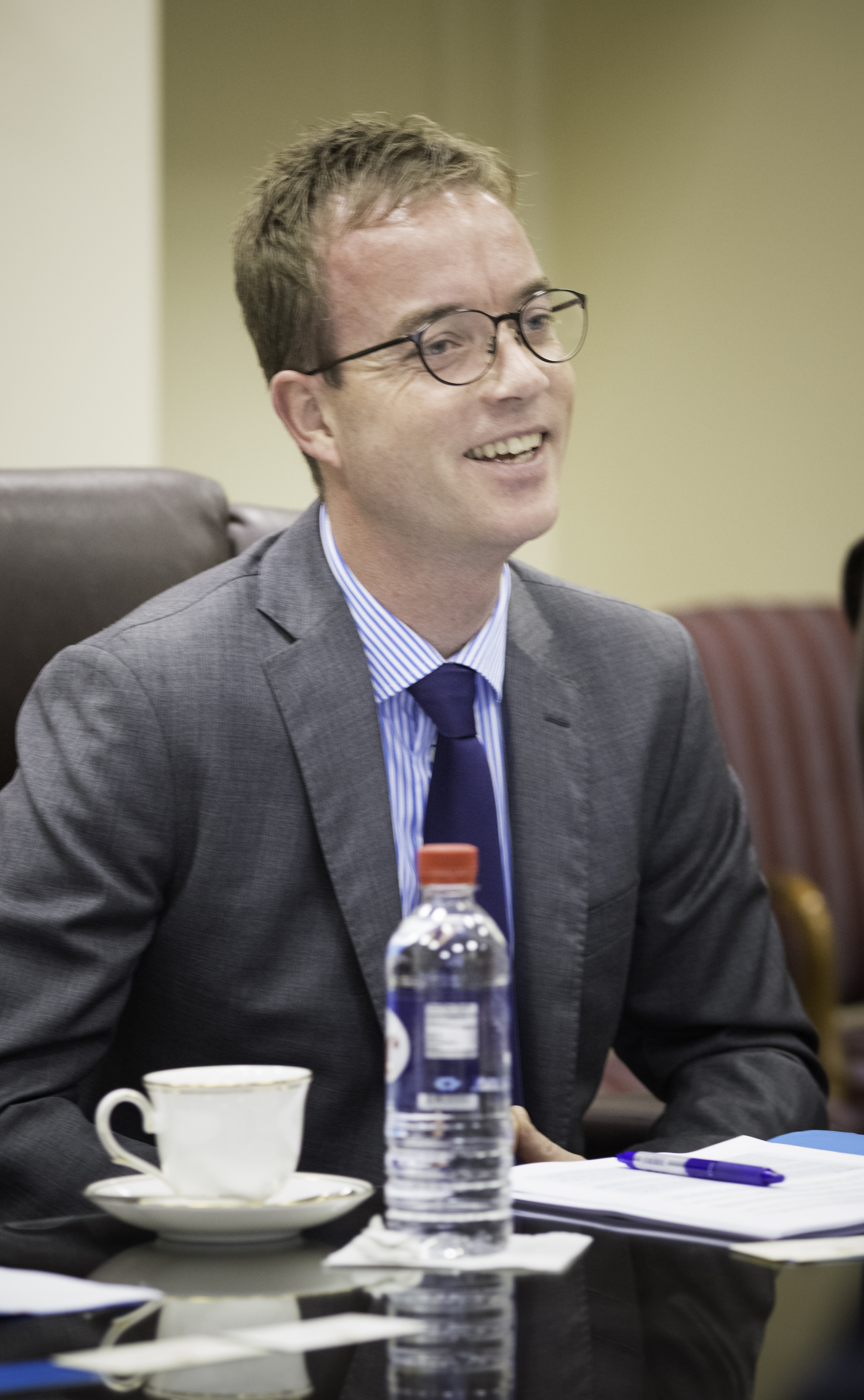
Esben Lunde Larsen met with Acting Deputy Agriculture Secretary Michael Scuse

In July 2018, he announced that he would leave the Folketing to work for the American organization World Resources Institute in Washington, D.C. In 2021, he was promoted from being a fellow at WRI to a newly created position as Director of Faith and Sustainability.

== Political career ==
Lunde Larsen joined the youth wing of the Venstre party, Venstres Ungdom, in 1995. He was elected to the municipal council for Ringkøbing-Skjern Municipality in 2006 and became deputy mayor in 2010. In the council, Lunde Larsen served as chairman of the Knowledge Committee and vice-chairman of the Finance and Business Committee.

In the 2011 parliamentary election, Lunde Larsen was elected to the Folketing with 10,183 personal votes. After the election, he became a member of Venstre's group board and was appointed as Venstre's spokesperson for Research, Innovation, and Higher Education, as well as spokesperson for the State Educational Grant (SU).
