= Anders Fogh Rasmussen III Cabinet =

Danish government from 2007 to 2009

Third Fogh Rasmussen Cabinet
- 72nd Cabinet of Denmark

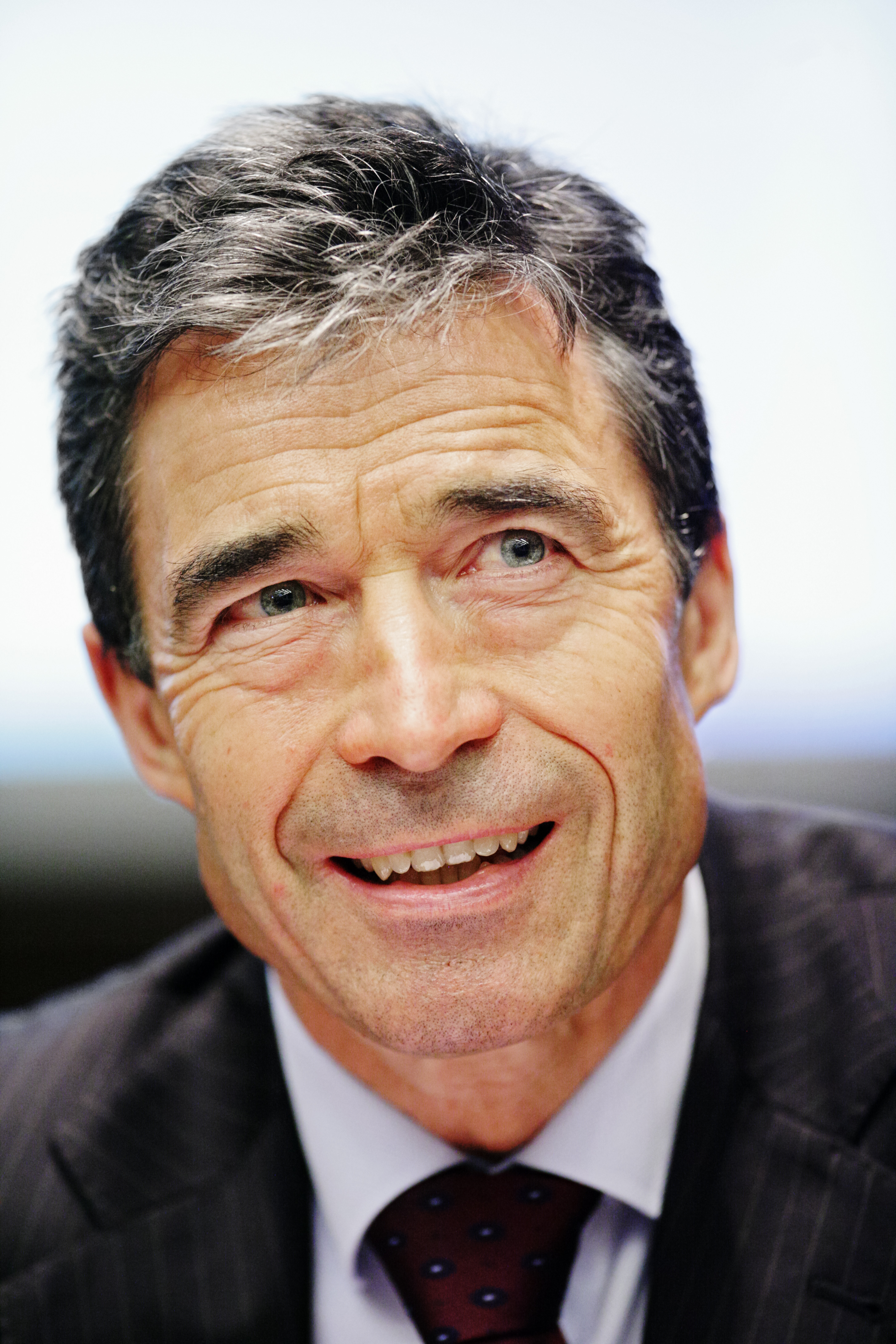
- Date formed: 23 November 2007
- Date dissolved: 5 April 2009

People and organisations
- Head of state: Margrethe II of Denmark
- Head of government: Anders Fogh Rasmussen
- No. of ministers: 20
- Total no. of members: 21
- Member parties: Venstre; Conservatives; Supported by: Danish People's Party
- Status in legislature: Minority coalition government
- Opposition parties: Social Democrats; Green Left; Social Liberals; Liberal Alliance; Red-Green Alliance

History
- Election: 2007
- Legislature term: 2007–2011
- Predecessor: A. F. Rasmussen II
- Successor: L. L. Rasmussen I

The third Cabinet of Danish Prime Minister Anders Fogh Rasmussen was announced on 23 November 2007.

== Changes from the Cabinet of Anders Fogh Rasmussen II ==
- Former Minister of Finances Thor Pedersen did instead of his old post take the seat as Speaker of Parliament, formerly held by Christian Mejdahl.
- Minister of Education and Ecclesiastical Affairs Bertel Haarder is retained as Minister of Education, but changes his second portfolio to being Minister of Nordic Cooperation.
- Social Minister and Minister of Equal Rights Karen Jespersen becomes minister of a new Welfare Ministry, merging the former Ministry of Interior Affairs, Ministry of Family and Consumer Affairs and Social Ministry into one.
- Former Interior and Health Minister Lars Løkke Rasmussen is appointed Minister of Finances.
- Former Minister of Environmental Affairs and Nordic Cooperation Connie Hedegaard is appointed Minister of Climate and Energy, thus splitting the former Ministry of Environmental Affairs up into two parts, the "traditional" Ministry of Environmental Affairs being taken over by newcomer Troels Lund Poulsen.
- Former Minister of Family and Consumer Affairs Carina Christensen is appointed new Minister of Transportation.
- Former Minister of Transportation Jakob Axel Nielsen is appointed new Minister of Health and Preventional Measures.
- Seasoned veteran Birthe Rønn Hornbech is appointed new Minister of Refugees, Immigrants and Integration along with Minister of Ecclesiastical Affairs.

== List of ministers and portfolios ==
Some periods in the table below start before 18 February 2005 or end after 23 November 2007 because the minister was also in the Cabinet of Anders Fogh Rasmussen I or III.

Portfolio	Minister	Took office	Left office	Party
Prime Minister's Office
Prime Minister	Anders Fogh Rasmussen	27 November 2001	5 April 2009	Venstre
Minister of Economic and Business Affairs	Bendt Bendtsen	27 November 2001	9 September 2008	Conservatives
Minister of Economic and Business Affairs	Lene Espersen	10 September 2008	23 February 2010	Conservatives
Minister for Foreign Affairs	Per Stig Møller	27 November 2001	23 February 2010	Conservatives
Minister for Finance	Lars Løkke Rasmussen	23 November 2007	5 April 2009	Venstre
Minister of Employment	Claus Hjort Frederiksen	27 November 2001	7 April 2009	Venstre
Minister for Justice	Lene Espersen	27 November 2001	10 September 2008	Conservatives
Minister for Justice	Brian Mikkelsen	10 September 2008	23 February 2010	Conservatives
Minister of Defence	Søren Gade	24 April 2004	23 February 2010	Venstre
Minister for Culture	Brian Mikkelsen	27 November 2001	10 September 2008	Conservatives
Minister for Culture	Carina Christensen	10 September 2008	23 February 2010	Conservatives
Minister for Taxation	Kristian Jensen	2 August 2004	24 February 2010	Venstre
Minister of Education & Minister for Nordic Cooperation	Bertel Haarder	23 November 2007	3 October 2011	Venstre
Minister for Climate and Energy	Connie Hedegaard	23 November 2007	24 November 2009	Conservatives
Minister of Traffic	Carina Christensen	23 November 2007	10 September 2008	Conservatives
Minister of Traffic	Lars Barfoed	10 September 2008	23 February 2010	Conservatives
Minister for Family and Consumer Affairs	Lars Barfoed	18 February 2005	14 December 2006	Conservatives
Minister for Family and Consumer Affairs	Carina Christensen	15 December 2006	23 November 2007	Conservatives
Minister for Food	Eva Kjer Hansen	12 September 2007	23 February 2010	Venstre
Minister for Science, Technology and Development	Helge Sander	27 November 2001	23 February 2010	Venstre
Minister for Ecclesiastical Affairs & Minister for Refugees, Immigrants and Integration	Birthe Rønn Hornbech	23 November 2007	8 March 2011	Venstre
Minister of Social Affairs & Minister for Gender Equality	Karen Jespersen	12 September 2007	7 April 2009	Venstre
Minister of Health and Prevention	Jakob Axel Nielsen	23 November 2007	23 February 2010	Conservatives
Minister for the Environment	Troels Lund Poulsen	23 November 2007	23 February 2010	Venstre
Minister for Development Cooperation	Ulla Tørnæs	18 February 2005	23 February 2010	Venstre

Preceded by Anders Fogh Rasmussen II	Cabinet of Denmark; 23 November 2007 – 5 April 2009	Succeeded by Lars Løkke Rasmussen
