= Anders Fogh Rasmussen II Cabinet =

Danish government from 2005 to 2007

Second Fogh Rasmussen Cabinet
- 71st Cabinet of Denmark

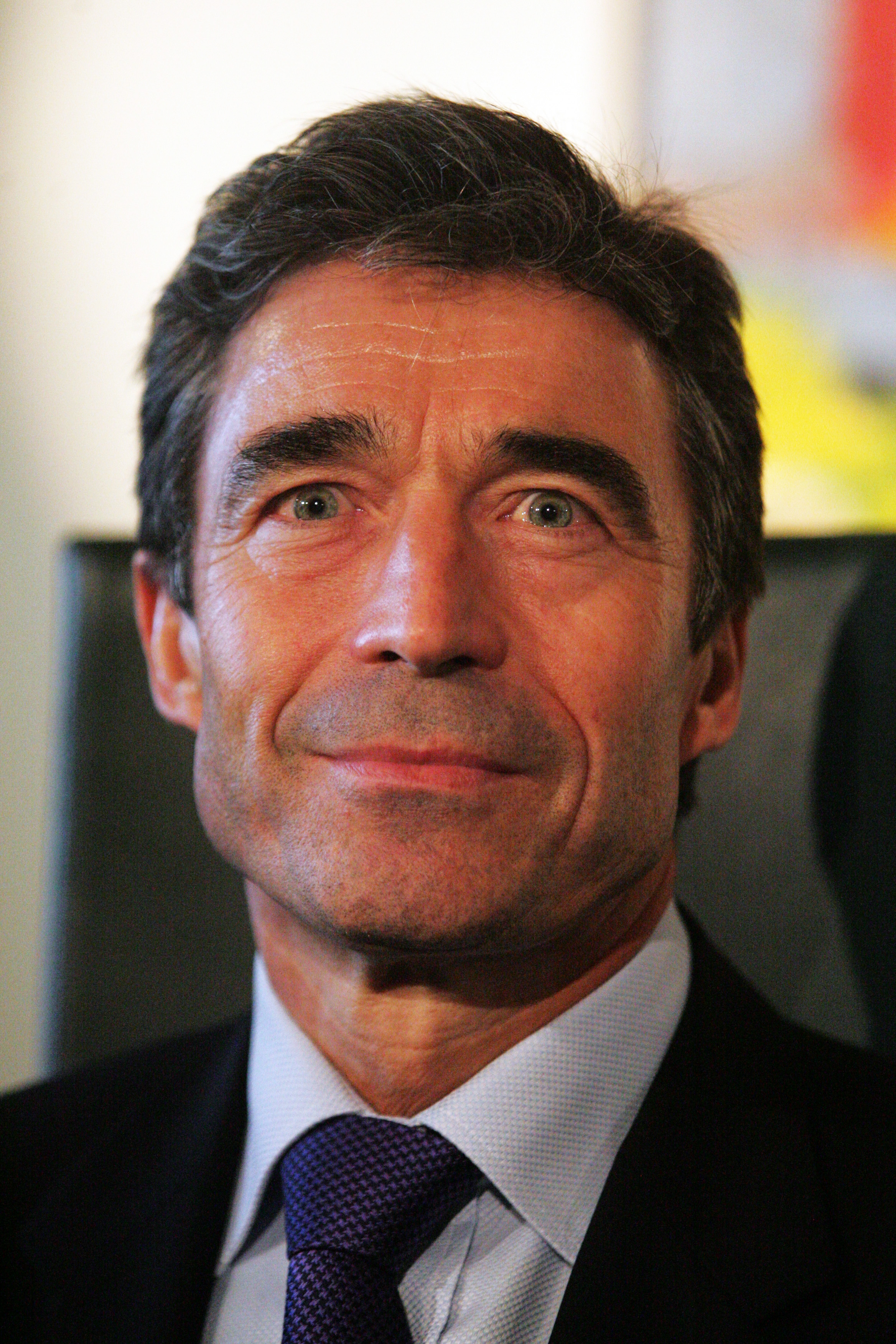
- Date formed: 18 February 2005
- Date dissolved: 23 November 2007

People and organisations
- Head of state: Margrethe II of Denmark
- Head of government: Anders Fogh Rasmussen
- No. of ministers: 20
- Ministers removed: 3
- Total no. of members: 23
- Member party: Venstre; Conservatives; Supported by: Danish People's Party
- Status in legislature: Minority coalition government
- Opposition parties: Social Democrats; Social Liberals; Green Left; Red-Green Alliance

History
- Election: 2005
- Outgoing election: 2007
- Legislature term: 2005–2007
- Predecessor: A. F. Rasmussen I
- Successor: A. F. Rasmussen III

Prime Minister Anders Fogh Rasmussen retained his parliamentary support in the 2005 Danish parliamentary election, and was able to continue as head of his government. On 18 February 2005, he presented his updated cabinet, the Cabinet of Anders Fogh Rasmussen II. One of the main issues of the cabinet was administrative reform that slashed the number of municipalities and replaced the thirteen counties with five regions.

Anders Fogh Rasmussen has referred to the reform as the biggest reform in thirty years. Furthermore, a reform of the police and judicial systems was initiated in January 2007, changing the numbers of police districts and city courts from 54 to 12 and 82 to 22 respectively. Rasmussen retained parliamentary support in the 2007 election and continued as Prime Minister in the Cabinet of Anders Fogh Rasmussen III, formed on 23 November 2007.

== Notable events ==
- On 8 June 2005 somebody made an arson attack on Minister for Refugees, Immigrants and Integration Rikke Hvilshøj's home. Rikke Hvilshøj, her husband, and her two small children escaped unharmed. It is not clear who was behind the attack (Though one unknown group has claimed responsibility), or what the motive were. Following the attack security was stepped up for several ministers.
- In January 2006 Prime Minister Anders Fogh Rasmussen became embroiled in the controversy of the Muhammad cartoons which initially were published in the Danish newspaper Jyllands-Posten.
- On 13 December 2006 Lars Barfoed was forced to resign as Minister of Family and Consumption because of issues with the ministry's food inspections. Carina Christensen was named as Barfoed's replacement.
- On 21 February 2007 Prime Minister Anders Fogh Rasmussen said that the 460 Danish troops in Iraq will have left by August.

== Changes from the Cabinet of Anders Fogh Rasmussen I ==
- Bertel Haarder changed from being Minister for Development Cooperation and Minister for Refugees, Immigrants and Integration to being Church Minister and Minister of Education.
- Tove Fergo, who failed to get reelected to parliament (though that is not a requirement for a minister) was replaced as Church Minister.
- Ulla Tørnæs switched from being Minister of Education to being Minister for Development Cooperation.
- Rikke Hvilshøj was appointed Minister for Refugees, Immigrants and Integration.
- Lars Barfoed replaced Henriette Kjær as Minister of Family and Consumption, after there had been some criticism Henriette Kjær because her personal finances were in disorder. Barfoed himself resigned, effective 14 December 2006.

== List of ministers and portfolios ==
Some periods in the table below start before 18 February 2005 or end after 23 November 2007 because the minister was also in the Cabinet of Anders Fogh Rasmussen I or III.

Portfolio	Minister	Took office	Left office	Party
Prime Minister's Office
Prime Minister	Anders Fogh Rasmussen	27 November 2001	5 April 2009	Venstre
Minister of Economic and Business Affairs	Bendt Bendtsen	27 November 2001	9 September 2008	Conservatives
Minister for Foreign Affairs	Per Stig Møller	27 November 2001	23 February 2010	Conservatives
Minister for Finance	Thor Pedersen	27 November 2001	23 November 2007	Venstre
Minister of Employment	Claus Hjort Frederiksen	27 November 2001	7 April 2009	Venstre
Minister of the Interior and Health	Lars Løkke Rasmussen	27 November 2001	23 November 2007	Venstre
Minister for Justice	Lene Espersen	27 November 2001	10 September 2008	Conservatives
Minister of Defence	Søren Gade	24 April 2004	23 February 2010	Venstre
Minister for Culture	Brian Mikkelsen	27 November 2001	10 September 2008	Conservatives
Minister for Taxation	Kristian Jensen	2 August 2004	24 February 2010	Venstre
Minister for Nordic Cooperation	Connie Hedegaard	18 February 2005	23 November 2007	Conservatives
Minister of Traffic & Minister for Energy	Flemming Hansen	27 November 2001	12 September 2007	Conservatives
Minister of Traffic & Minister for Energy	Jakob Axel Nielsen	12 September 2007	23 November 2007	Conservatives
Minister for Family and Consumer Affairs	Lars Barfoed	18 February 2005	14 December 2006	Conservatives
Minister for Family and Consumer Affairs	Carina Christensen	15 December 2006	23 November 2007	Conservatives
Minister for Food	Hans Christian Schmidt	2 August 2004	12 September 2007	Venstre
Minister for Food	Eva Kjer Hansen	12 September 2007	23 February 2010	Venstre
Minister for Science, Technology and Development	Helge Sander	23 March 1998	23 February 2010	Venstre
Minister of Education	Bertel Haarder	18 February 2005	23 February 2010	Venstre
Minister for Ecclesiastical Affairs	Bertel Haarder	18 February 2005	23 November 2007	Venstre
Minister of Social Affairs & Minister for Gender Equality	Eva Kjer Hansen	2 August 2004	12 September 2007	Venstre
Minister of Social Affairs & Minister for Gender Equality	Karen Jespersen	12 September 2007	23 November 2007	Venstre
Minister for the Environment	Connie Hedegaard	2 August 2004	23 November 2007	Conservatives
Minister for Development Cooperation	Ulla Tørnæs	18 February 2005	23 February 2010	Venstre
Minister for Refugees, Immigrants and Integration	Rikke Hvilshøj	18 February 2005	23 November 2007	Venstre

Preceded by Anders Fogh Rasmussen I	Cabinet of Denmark; 18 February 2005 – 23 November 2007	Succeeded by Anders Fogh Rasmussen III
