= Cabinet of Anders Fogh Rasmussen =

Cabinet of Anders Fogh Rasmussen may refer to:

- Cabinet of Anders Fogh Rasmussen I, formed after the 2001 Danish parliamentary election
- Cabinet of Anders Fogh Rasmussen II, formed after the 2005 Danish parliamentary election
- Cabinet of Anders Fogh Rasmussen III, formed after the 2007 Danish parliamentary election
