= Henriette Kjær =

Danish politician (born 1966)

Henriette Kjær (born 3 May 1966) is a retired Danish politician, former member of the Danish parliament (Folketinget) for the Conservative People's Party elected in Aarhus' fourth constituency.

Henriette Kjær was Social Minister and Minister for Gender Equality from 27 November 2001 to 2 August 2004 and Minister for Family and Consumer Affairs from 2 August 2004 to 18 February 2005, both posts in the Cabinet of Anders Fogh Rasmussen I.

On 17 January 2005, when Henriette Kjær was Minister for Family and Consumer Affairs, she announced that there would be no initiatives for families with children in the next two months. However, on the next day, when the 2005 Danish parliamentary election was announced, the coalition leaders Anders Fogh Rasmussen and Bendt Bendtsen announced lower institution child care costs and higher børnecheck (direct financial aid for all families with children) . In February 2005, just before the 2005 Danish parliamentary election, her domestic partner, Erik Skov Pedersen, became the subject of media attention due to disorder in the couple's private finances, forcing them to default on their payments. On 16 February 2005, a week after the 2005 Danish parliamentary election had taken place and two days before Prime Minister Anders Fogh Rasmussen was to announce his new cabinet, Henriette Kjær resigned as minister.

Henriette Kjær was later appointed political spokesperson and group leader of the Conservative party, but resigned from those posts on 25 January 2011, due to renewed media attention concerning the state of her private finances and her ability to fulfil her political tasks. Furthermore, she announced her intention to leave politics altogether after the parliamentary election held on 15 September 2011.

Karina Boldsen succeeded Henriette Kjær as a parliamentary candidate on 14 April 2011 but was not elected receiving 2,432 direct votes against 'Henriette Kjær's 10,195 on 13 November 2007 .

Political offices
Preceded by Henrik Dam Kristensen	Social Minister; 2001 – 2004	Succeeded by Eva Kjer Hansen
Preceded by Lotte Bundsgaard	Minister for Gender Equality; 2001 – 2004	Succeeded by Eva Kjer Hansen
Preceded by New office	Minister for Family and Consumer Affairs; 2004 – 2005	Succeeded by Lars Barfoed
