= Helge Sander =

Danish politician (born 1950)

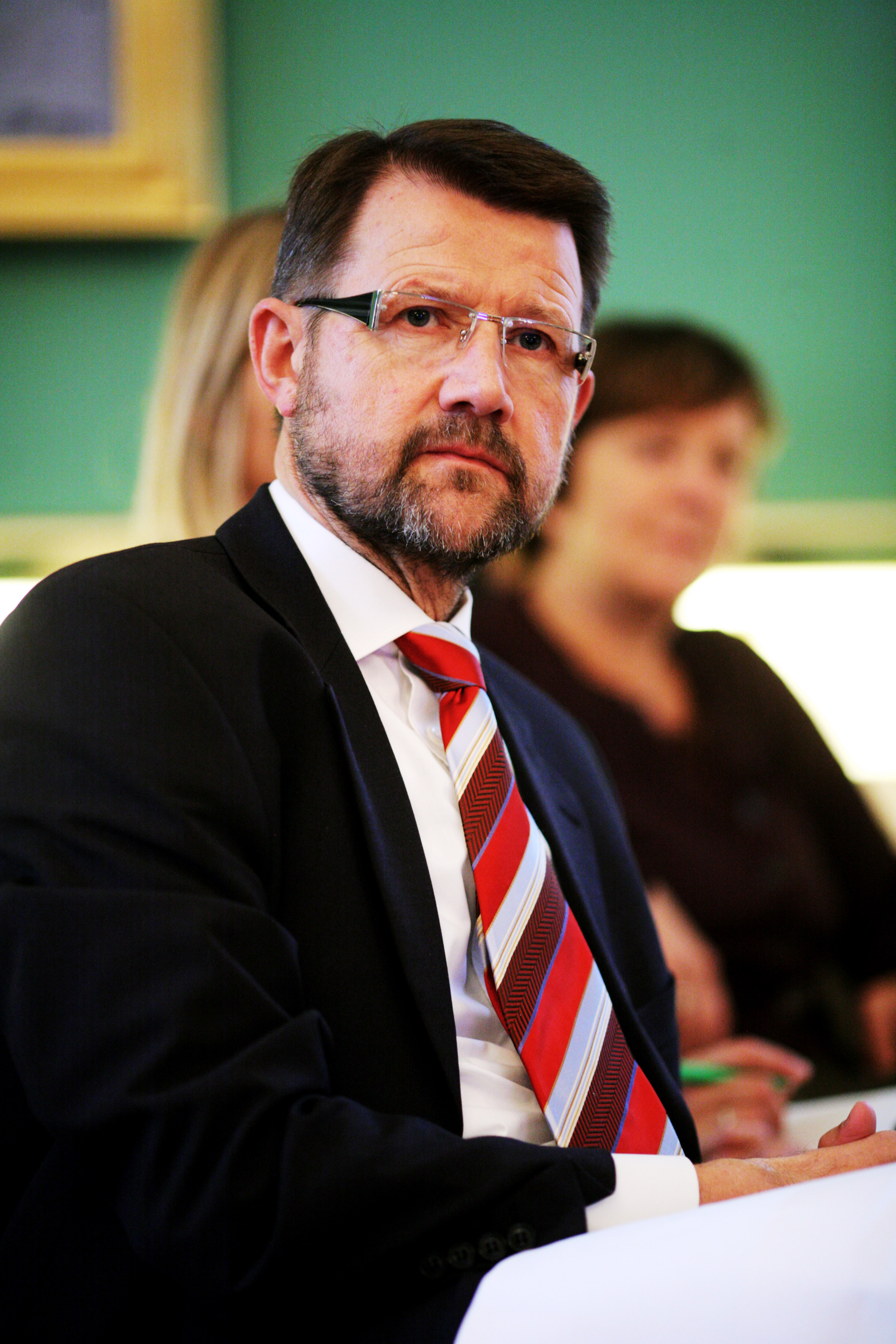
Helge Sander at the Nordic Council in Copenhagen in 2006

Helge Mølsted Sander (born 27 August 1950) is a Danish politician. He is the former Danish Minister of Science, Technology and Development (Ministry of Science, Technology and Innovation of Denmark) (from 27 November 2001, as member of the Cabinet of Anders Fogh Rasmussen I, II and III). He is a member of the Liberal Party, and was a member of parliament (Folketinget) from 10 January 1984 to 31 January 1998; and again from 2005.

== Education and career ==
He received his Lower Secondary School Examination degree from Aulum Urban School. Then he trained as a journalist with the newspaper Herning Folkeblad from 1968 to 1971. He was a journalist with the newspaper Morgenavisen Jyllands-Posten from 1972 to 1973, Head of Arrangements at A/S Exhibition Centre Herning from 1973 to 1977, and then Director of A/S Herning Fremad Football Club from 1978 to 1979. Sander was a member of the Town Council of Herning from 1974 to 1979, and from 1994 to 2001; during the latter period, he was Deputy Mayor from 1994 to 1998, and Mayor from 1998 to 2001.

== Reform controversy ==
During Sander's time as Minister of Science, he has been behind the implementation of a series of controversial reforms of Danish Universities: Under the heading of "from thought to invoice", Sander has removed faculty and scientific personnel from the decision process and placed institutional power with an external board, having a majority of members appointed by the ministry.

Subsequently, a survey of European universities placed Denmark 21 out of 23 European countries with regards to the protection of academic freedom. DM (Dansk Magisterforening) has submitted a complaint to UNESCO that this fails to comply with the 1997 UNESCO Recommendation concerning the Status of Higher-Education Teaching Personnel, which the Danish Government has signed.

The reforms have resulted in declining efficiency, where the yearly expenses of Danish Universities towards administration have increased by a sum of 700 million DKR, while most researchers report having less time to do research.

As of November 2008, close to 50% of Danish researchers have signed a petition asking for improvement in working conditions and the protection of academic freedom. Theoretical biologist and philosopher Claus Emmeche was one of the organizers of the petition and was surprised with the ease at which the petition gained a large amount of support.

== Notes ==
Political offices
Preceded by Birte Weiss	Minister of Science, Technology and Development; 2001 - 2010	Succeeded by Charlotte Sahl-Madsen
