= Minister of Consumer Affairs =

Minister of Consumer Affairs may refer to:

- Minister for Family and Consumer Affairs of Denmark
- Minister of Consumer and Corporate Affairs in Canada
- Minister of Consumer and Corporate Affairs (Manitoba) in Canada
- Minister of Consumer Affairs, Food and Public Distribution (India)
- Minister of Consumer Affairs (New Zealand)
