= Low carbon leakage =

Low carbon leakage refers to the phenomenon of a country or a region losing its low carbon industries to another country or region. The underlying low carbon leakage trend can also be identified by looking into clean energy patent distribution around the World. The threat of low carbon leakage to the European Union has been repeatedly expressed by a number of European Politicians such as climate Commissioner Connie Hedegaard, UK Energy Secretary Edward Davey and others.

The low carbon leakage increases its relevance for the industrial competitiveness as the low carbon economy grows and has reached in 2013 $4 trillion and continues to grow at 4% per year. Not taking relevant part in this growth opportunity is also considered as low carbon leakage.

In October 2014 E&Y published a report "European Low Carbon Industries. A Health Check." specifically examining the state of the European low carbon sectors. The report lists a wide variety of cases in which "low carbon leakage" occurs or could occur.

Low carbon leakage could lead to a significant loss of competitiveness for Europe. According to former German federal minister Trittin: “In reality there is no carbon leakage. The danger of low carbon leakage is much more real." I typical example is the solar panel manufacturing that has developed rapidly in China and shrunk in Europe.
