= 2005 Danish general election =

- 8 February 2005
- All 179 seats in the Folketing; 90 seats needed for a majority
- Turnout: 84.20%
Party	Leader	Vote %	Seats	+/–
Venstre	Anders Fogh Rasmussen	29.03	52	−4
Social Democrats	Mogens Lykketoft	25.84	47	−5
DPP	Pia Kjærsgaard	13.25	24	+2
Conservatives	Bendt Bendtsen	10.27	18	+2
Social Liberals	Marianne Jelved	9.18	17	+8
SF	Holger K. Nielsen	5.99	11	−1
Red–Green	Collective leadership	3.40	6	+2
Elected in the Faroe Islands
Republican	Høgni Hoydal	25.36	1	0
People's	Anfinn Kallsberg	24.02	1	+1
Elected in Greenland
Siumut	Hans Enoksen	33.66	1	0
Inuit Ataqatigiit	Josef Motzfeldt	25.04	1	0
This lists parties that won seats. See the complete results below.

Government before	Government after election
Fogh Rasmussen I V–K	Fogh Rasmussen II; V–K

General elections were held in Denmark on 8 February 2005. Prime Minister Anders Fogh Rasmussen's Venstre remained the largest party in the Folketing and his governing coalition with the Conservative People's Party remained intact, with the Danish People's Party providing the parliamentary support needed for the minority government. The Danish Social Liberal Party made the biggest gains of any party, although it remained outside the governing group of parties. The elections marked the second time in a row that the Social Democrats were not the largest party in parliament, a change from most of the 20th century. The Social Democrats lost five seats and leader Mogens Lykketoft resigned immediately after the elections. Voter turnout was 85% in Denmark proper, 73% in the Faroe Islands and 59% in Greenland.

== Background ==
Prior to the SARS pandemic in 2003 and with Boxing Day tsunami in December 2004, Prime Minister Rasmussen called the elections on 18 January. Rasmussen still had almost a year left in his term, but he said that the country wanted to call the election before municipal elections in November. His reasoning was that he wanted a clear mandate for the municipal and county government restructuring that his government was implementing.

In the previous elections in 2001, the governing coalition of Venstre and the Conservative People's Party had won 94 of the 175 seats together with the supporting Danish People's Party.

== Electoral system ==
This was the last election in which the counties were used as constituencies.

== Campaign ==
Venstre campaigned on their municipal restructuring plan, as well as a continuation of the "tax-freeze" and tight immigration requirements. They also promised to see 60,000 jobs created during a second term.

The largest opposition party, the Social Democrats focused on employment, which they claim has decreased under the current government.

The Danish People's Party, which supported the Venstre–Conservative coalition, criticized the "tax-freeze" but agreed, conditionally, to support it for another parliamentary term. They also wanted increasingly tough immigration restrictions.

== Results ==
63 out of the 179 members of the new Folketing were newly elected. Although women made up 38% of the total, several women held prominent positions, notably Pia Kjærsgaard, leader of the third largest party, the Danish People's Party. Marianne Jelved (leader of the Danish Social Liberal Party), Connie Hedegaard (Minister of the Environment), Pernille Rosenkrantz-Theil (front figure of Enhedslisten) and Helle Thorning-Schmidt (later elected as leader of Social Democrats) were other important woman in the parliament. A couple of parties, including the Social Democrats were holding leadership races, which might have been won by women. 9 of the top 20 candidates, in terms of personal votes, were women.

Party	Votes	%	Seats	+/–
Denmark proper
Venstre	974,636	29.03	52	–4
Social Democrats	867,349	25.84	47	–5
Danish People's Party	444,947	13.25	24	+2
Conservative People's Party	344,886	10.27	18	+2
Danish Social Liberal Party	308,212	9.18	17	+8
Socialist People's Party	201,047	5.99	11	–1
Red–Green Alliance	114,123	3.40	6	+2
Christian Democrats	58,071	1.73	0	–4
Centre Democrats	33,880	1.01	0	0
Minority Party	8,850	0.26	0	New
Independents	1,211	0.04	0	0
Total	3,357,212	100.00	175	0
Valid votes	3,357,212	99.19		
Invalid/blank votes	27,348	0.81		
Total votes	3,384,560	100.00		
Registered voters/turnout	4,003,616	84.54		
Faroe Islands
Republican Party	6,301	25.36	1	0
People's Party	5,967	24.02	1	+1
Social Democratic Party	5,518	22.21	0	0
Union Party	5,333	21.47	0	–1
Centre Party	829	3.34	0	New
Self-Government	585	2.35	0	0
Independents	309	1.24	0	New
Total	24,842	100.00	2	0
Valid votes	24,842	99.62		
Invalid/blank votes	94	0.38		
Total votes	24,936	100.00		
Registered voters/turnout	34,166	72.98		
Greenland
Siumut	7,761	33.66	1	0
Inuit Ataqatigiit	5,774	25.04	1	0
Democrats	4,909	21.29	0	New
Atassut	3,774	16.37	0	0
Independents	841	3.65	0	0
Total	23,059	100.00	2	0
Valid votes	23,059	98.06		
Invalid/blank votes	457	1.94		
Total votes	23,516	100.00		
Registered voters/turnout	39,588	59.40		
Source: Danmarks Statistik, Nohlen & Stöver

=== Maps ===
Largest party within each nomination district and constituency.

Largest party within each municipality.

== Aftermath ==
Following the elections, Prime Minister Anders Fogh Rasmussen reformed his liberal-conservative cabinet as the Cabinet of Anders Fogh Rasmussen II with parliamentary support from Danish People's Party.

== See also ==
- List of members of the Folketing, 2005–2007
