= Anders Fogh Rasmussen I Cabinet =

Danish government from 2001 to 2005

First Anders Fogh Rasmussen
- 70th Cabinet of Denmark

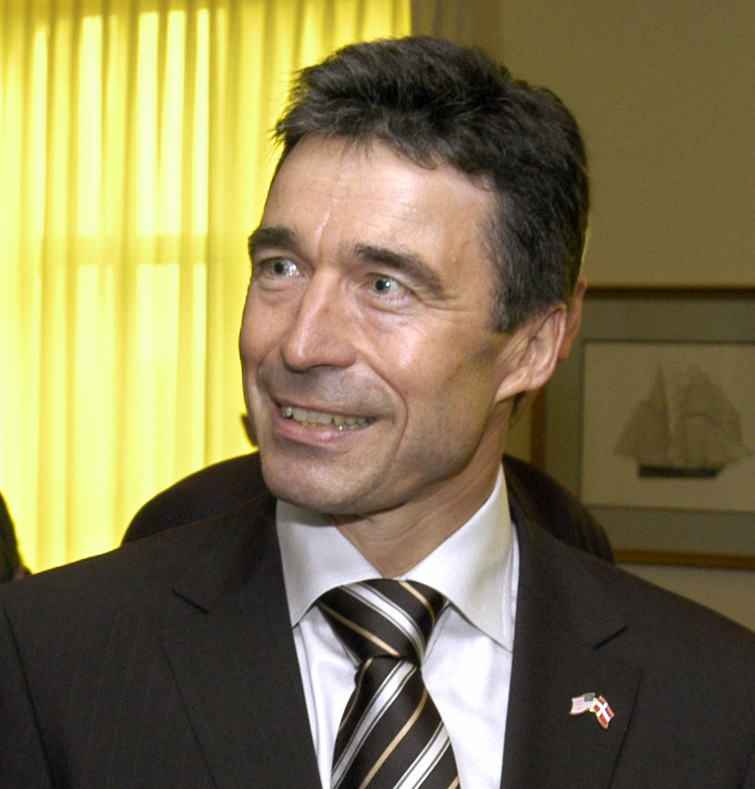
- Date formed: 27 November 2001
- Date dissolved: 18 February 2005

People and organisations
- Head of state: Margrethe II of Denmark
- Head of government: Anders Fogh Rasmussen
- No. of ministers: 20
- Ministers removed: 4
- Total no. of members: 24
- Member parties: Venstre; Conservatives; Supported by: Danish People's Party
- Status in legislature: Minority coalition government
- Opposition parties: Social Democrats; Green Left; Social Liberals; Red-Green Alliance; Christian Democrats

History
- Election: 2001
- Outgoing election: 2005
- Legislature term: 2001–2005
- Predecessor: P. N. Rasmussen IV
- Successor: A. F. Rasmussen II

After the 2001 Danish parliamentary election, Anders Fogh Rasmussen was able form a government coalition of his own Liberal Party Venstre and the Conservative People's Party. It was a minority government with the parliamentary support of the Danish People's Party. The resulting cabinet is called the Cabinet of Anders Fogh Rasmussen I. Apart from the EU Presidency in 2002 during which the enlargement of the European Union was decided, the main issues for the cabinet were the so-called tax freeze, which ended the upward drift in municipal income tax rates, tax cuts, law and order, limiting the number of refugees and immigrants coming to Denmark as well as the war in Afghanistan and Iraq.

In the 2005 Danish parliamentary election, Anders Fogh Rasmussen retained his parliamentary support, and was able to reform his cabinet as the Cabinet of Anders Fogh Rasmussen II, with a few changes from the Cabinet of Anders Fogh Rasmussen I.

== Cabinet changes ==
On 18 June 2002 Flemming Hansen replaced Bendt Bendtsen as Minister of Nordic Cooperation.

In April 2004 Svend Aage Jensby resigned and was replaced by Søren Gade.

On 2 August 2004 there was a cabinet change:

- Henriette Kjær was appointed to the new post of Minister of Family and Consumption.
- Bertel Haarder was appointed to the new post of Minister for Development Cooperation.
- Kristian Jensen replaced Svend Erik Hovmand as Tax Minister.
- Hans Christian Schmidt replaced Mariann Fischer Boel as Minister of Food. Mariann Fischer Boel became a member of the European Commission.
- Eva Kjer Hansen replaced Henriette Kjær as Social Minister and Minister for Women's Rights.
- Connie Hedegaard replaced Hans Christian Schmidt as Minister for the Environment.

== List of ministers and portfolios ==
Some periods in the table below end after 18 February 2005 because the minister also serves in Anders Fogh Rasmussens second cabinet.

Portfolio	Minister	Took office	Left office	Party
Prime Minister's Office
Prime Minister	Anders Fogh Rasmussen	27 November 2001	5 April 2009	Venstre
Minister of Economic and Business Affairs	Bendt Bendtsen	27 November 2001	9 September 2008	Conservatives
Minister for Foreign Affairs	Per Stig Møller	27 November 2001	23 February 2010	Conservatives
Minister for Finance	Thor Pedersen	27 November 2001	23 November 2007	Venstre
Minister of Employment	Claus Hjort Frederiksen	27 November 2001	7 April 2009	Venstre
Minister of the Interior and Health	Lars Løkke Rasmussen	27 November 2001	23 November 2007	Venstre
Minister for Justice	Lene Espersen	27 November 2001	10 September 2008	Conservatives
Minister of Defence	Svend Aage Jensby	27 November 2001	24 April 2004	Venstre
Minister of Defence	Søren Gade	24 April 2004	23 February 2010	Venstre
Minister for Culture	Brian Mikkelsen	27 November 2001	10 September 2008	Conservatives
Minister for Taxation	Svend Erik Hovmand	27 November 2001	2 August 2004	Venstre
Minister for Taxation	Kristian Jensen	2 August 2004	24 February 2010	Venstre
Minister for Nordic Cooperation	Bendt Bendtsen	27 November 2001	18 June 2002	Conservatives
Minister for Nordic Cooperation	Flemming Hansen	18 June 2002	18 February 2005	Conservatives
Minister of Traffic & Minister for Energy	Flemming Hansen	27 November 2001	12 September 2007	Conservatives
Minister for Family and Consumer Affairs (Created 2 August 2004)	Henriette Kjær	2 August 2004	18 February 2005	Conservatives
Minister for Food	Mariann Fischer Boel	27 November 2001	2 August 2004	Venstre
Minister for Food	Hans Christian Schmidt	2 August 2004	12 September 2007	Venstre
Minister for Science, Technology and Development	Helge Sander	23 March 1998	23 February 2010	Venstre
Minister of Education	Ulla Tørnæs	27 November 2001	18 February 2005	Venstre
Minister for Ecclesiastical Affairs	Tove Fergo	27 November 2001	18 February 2005	Venstre
Minister of Social Affairs & Minister for Gender Equality	Henriette Kjær	27 November 2001	2 August 2004	Conservatives
Minister of Social Affairs & Minister for Gender Equality	Eva Kjer Hansen	2 August 2004	12 September 2007	Venstre
Minister for the Environment	Hans Christian Schmidt	27 November 2001	2 August 2004	Venstre
Minister for the Environment	Connie Hedegaard	2 August 2004	23 November 2007	Conservatives
Minister for Development Cooperation (Re-created 2 August 2004)	Bertel Haarder	2 August 2004	18 February 2005	Venstre
Minister for Refugees, Immigrants and Integration	Bertel Haarder	27 November 2001	18 February 2005	Venstre
Minister without Portfolio/Minister of European Affairs	Bertel Haarder	27 November 2001	31 December 2002	Venstre

Preceded by Poul Nyrup Rasmussen IV	Cabinet of Denmark; 27 November 2001 – 18 February 2005	Succeeded by Anders Fogh Rasmussen II
