= Carina Christensen =

Danish politician (born 1972)

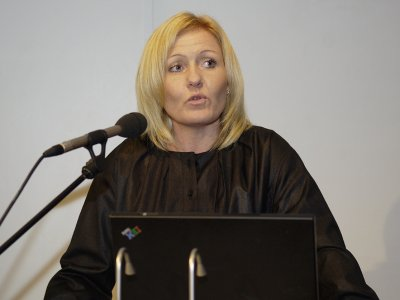
Carina Christensen

Carina Christensen (born 8 November 1972, in Fredericia) is a Danish politician representing the Conservative People's Party. She was the Minister of Family and Consumer Affairs in the Cabinet of Anders Fogh Rasmussen II from 15 December 2006 to 23 November 2007. She replaced Lars Barfoed after he had been criticized for poor official food quality inspections. Such inspections fall under the portfolio of the Family and Consumption Ministry.

Christensen was the Minister for Transportation from 23 November 2007 to 10 September 2008 and she has since been Culture Minister, both as a member of the Cabinet of Anders Fogh Rasmussen III.

== Early life ==
Born in Fredericia. She graduated in business administration and languages from South Jutland University Centre.

Political offices
Preceded by Lars Barfoed	Minister of Family and Consumption; 15 December 2006 – 23 November 2007	Succeeded by Office abolished
Preceded by Jakob Axel Nielsen	Minister for Transportation; 23 November 2007 – 10 September 2008	Succeeded by Lars Barfoed
Preceded by Brian Mikkelsen	Culture Minister of Denmark; 2008–2010	Succeeded by Per Stig Møller
