= Rikke Hvilshøj =

Danish politician (born 1970)

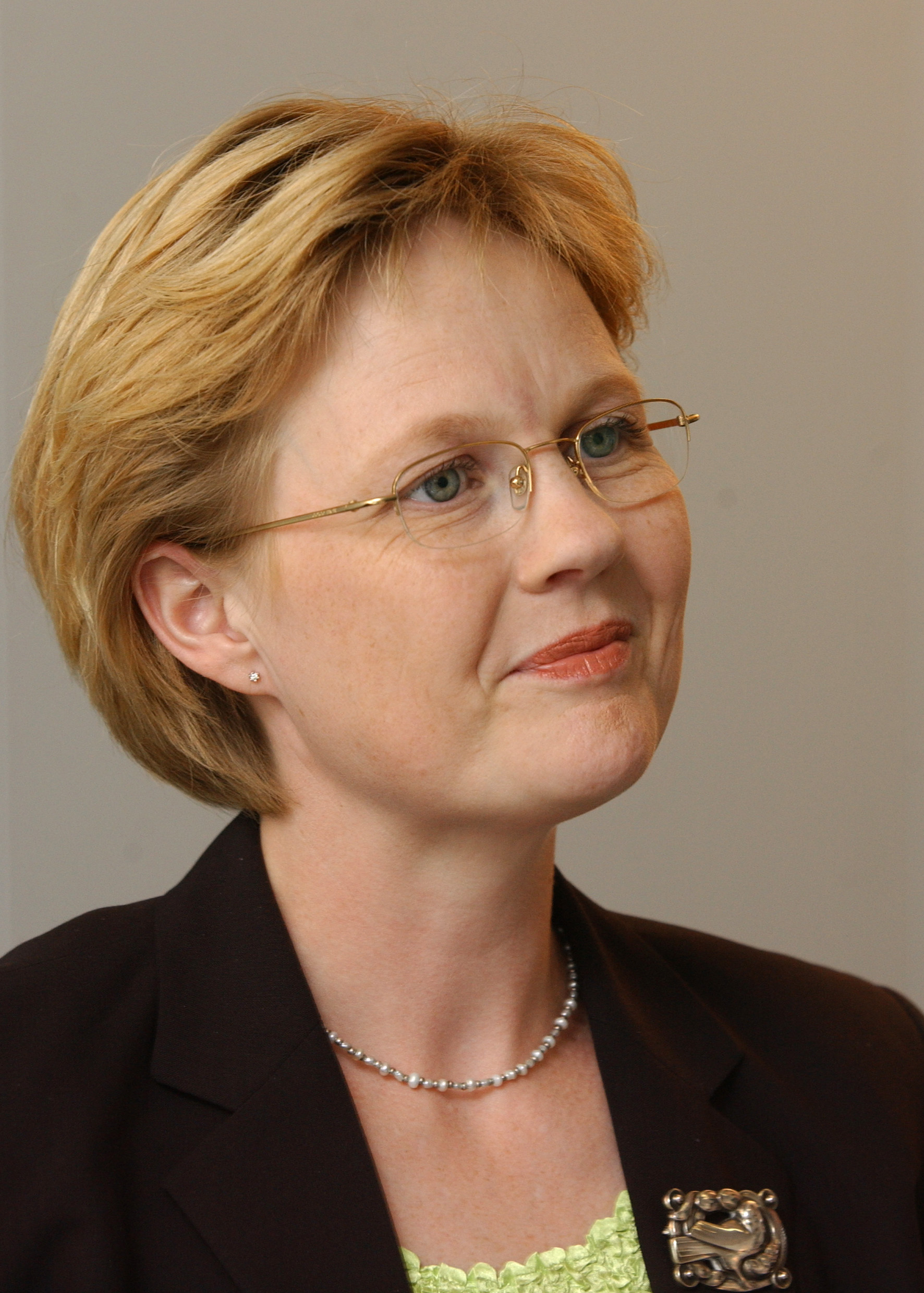
Rikke Hvilshøj in 2005

Rikke Hvilshøj (born 5 May 1970 in Aarhus) is a Danish politician representing the liberal party Venstre. She was the Minister for Refugees, Immigrants and Integration in the Cabinet of Anders Fogh Rasmussen II from 18 February 2005 to 23 November 2007. She became a member of Folketinget on 11 March 1998, but on 13 May 2008 announced that she would be leaving parliament to begin work for an organization representing Danish industry from August 2008.

== 2005 arson attack ==
At 3am on 8 June 2005 her car, parked in a garage alongside her house, was set on fire. The car and a side of the house were burned, but Hvilshøj, her husband, and her two small children escaped unharmed. As of 2008 no arrests had been made, and it is not known who started the fire; a young man seen running away from the house was identified by police, who said he was not under suspicion.

An unknown group calling itself "Aktionsgruppen Grænseløse Beate", The Actiongroup Borderless Beate ("Beate" is a name) sent an email claiming responsibility, citing what it called the government's "racist refugee politics" as the reason for the attack. The police say that the email was composed the day before the attack, on a Yahoo! Mail account in the Internet cafe Powerplay on Østerbro, Copenhagen.

At one point the police announced that they had the person who had composed the email in custody. However, the man was found to have an alibi documenting that he could not have been at the internet cafe at the indicated time. It was later reported that the employees who had pointed out the man had lied to cover internal affairs in the cafe, which they did not want the police to see (the news article is not explicit, but implies that the internal affairs they tried to hide are unrelated to the arson attack). The two men who lied were charged with making false witness statements, an imprisonable offence.

Political offices
Preceded by Bertel Haarder	Minister for Refugees, Immigrants and Integration; 18 February 2005 – 23 November 2007	Succeeded by Birthe Rønn Hornbech
