= Elsebeth Gerner Nielsen =

Danish politician (born 1960)

Member of Parliament
- In office 1994–2007

Minister for Culture
- In office 23 March 1998 – 27 November 2001
- Preceded by: Ebbe Lundgaard
- Succeeded by: Brian Mikkelsen

Personal details
- Born: 5 January 1960 (age 66)
- Party: Danish Social Liberal Party
- Education: Odense University
- Occupation: Politician

Elsebeth Gerner Nielsen (born 5 January 1960) is a Danish politician, former principal of Design School Kolding, and former Minister of Culture and former Member of Parliament for the Radical Left.

She was a Member of Parliament for Vejle County from 21 September 1994, and was Minister of Culture from 23 March 1998 to 27 November 2001.

== Life ==
Nielsen graduated from Odense University, and was subsequently assigned as education assistant at the university. She was elected member of Folketinget for the Danish Social Liberal Party from 1994 to 2007. She was Minister for Culture in Poul Nyrup Rasmussen's fourth cabinet from 1998 to 2001.

She is married and has four children.

In March 2020, she tested positive for coronavirus.
