= Minister for Integration (Denmark) =

Danish cabinet position

Minister of Integration
- Integrationsminister
- State coat of arms of the Kingdom of Denmark

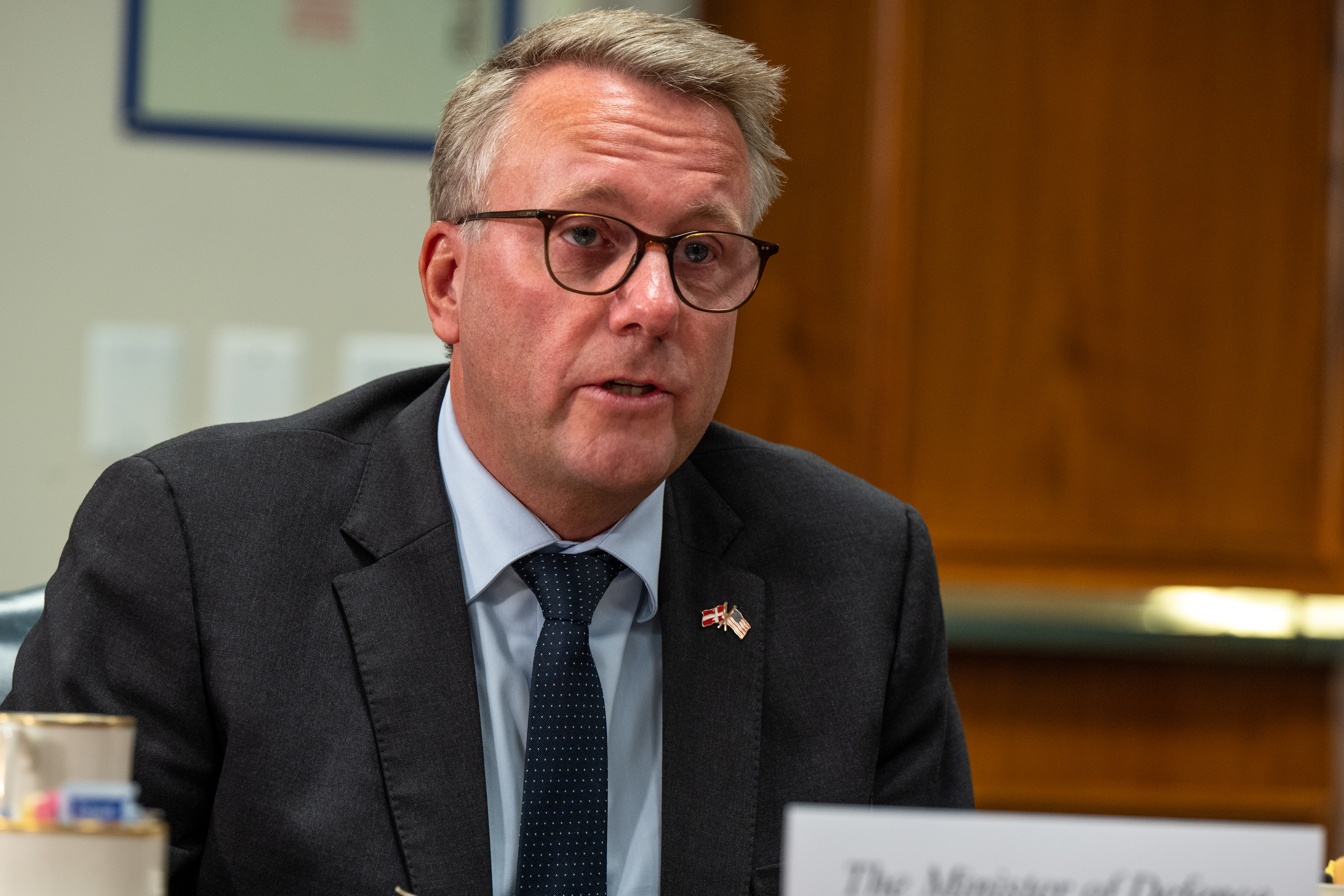
- Incumbent; Morten Bødskov since 3 June 2026
- Ministry of Immigration and Integration
- Type: Minister
- Member of: Cabinet; State Council
- Reports to: the Prime minister
- Seat: Slotsholmen
- Appointer: The Monarch (on the advice of the Prime Minister)
- Formation: 27 November 2001; 24 years ago
- First holder: Bertel Haarder
- Succession: depending on the order in the State Council
- Deputy: Permanent Secretary
- Salary: 1.624.503,02 DKK (€217,931), in 2026
- Website: Official website

Minister for Integration (Danish: Integrationsminister) is a Danish ministerial office. The office was created by Prime Minister Anders Fogh Rasmussen on 27 November 2001 when he formed the Cabinet of Anders Fogh Rasmussen I after the 2001 Danish parliamentary election, in which refugees, immigration, and integration of people from non-western countries had been important issues.

One of the stated goals of the Anders Fogh cabinet, and especially the supporting Danish People's Party which secured the government's majority, was to "stem the flow" of refugees to Denmark, and new tougher rules did drastically reduce the number of refugees being granted asylum. Another initiative was the 24 year rule, which stated that spouses must be 24 or older before they could immigrate to Denmark through family reunification (there had been many cases of arranged marriages of young people being used to get around immigration restrictions).

== List of ministers ==
No.	Portrait	Name (born-died)	Term of office			Political party	Government	Ref.
No.	Portrait	Name (born-died)	Took office	Left office	Time in office	Political party	Government	Ref.
Minister for Refugees, Immigrants and Integration (Minister for flygtninge, indvandrere og integration)
1		Bertel Haarder (born 1944)	27 November 2001	18 February 2005	3 years, 83 days	Venstre	A. F. Rasmussen I	
2		Rikke Hvilshøj (born 1970)	18 February 2005	23 November 2007	2 years, 278 days	Venstre	A. F. Rasmussen II	
3		Birthe Rønn Hornbech (born 1943)	23 November 2007	8 March 2011	3 years, 105 days	Venstre	A. F. Rasmussen III; L. L. Rasmussen I	
4		Søren Pind (born 1969)	8 March 2011	3 October 2011	209 days	Venstre	L. L. Rasmussen I	
Minister of Social Affairs and Integration (Social- og integrationsminister)
5		Karen Hækkerup (born 1974)	3 October 2011	9 August 2013	1 year, 310 days	Social Democrats	Thorning-Schmidt I	
Minister of Social Affairs, Children and Integration (Social-, børne- og integrationsminister)
6		Annette Vilhelmsen (born 1959)	9 August 2013	3 February 2014	178 days	Green Left	Thorning-Schmidt I	
Minister for Children, Gender Equality, Integration and Social Affairs (Minister for børn, ligestilling, integration og sociale forhold)
7		Manu Sareen (born 1967)	3 February 2014	28 June 2015	1 year, 145 days	Social Liberals	Thorning-Schmidt II	
Minister for Foreigners, Integration and Housing (Udlændinge-, integrations- og boligminister)
8		Inger Støjberg (born 1973)	28 June 2015	28 November 2016	1 year, 153 days	Venstre	L. L. Rasmussen II	
Minister for Foreigners and Integration (Udlændinge- og integrationsminister)
8		Inger Støjberg (born 1973)	28 November 2016	27 June 2019	2 years, 211 days	Venstre	L. L. Rasmussen III	
9		Mattias Tesfaye (born 1981)	27 June 2019	2 May 2022	2 years, 309 days	Social Democrats	Frederiksen I	
10		Kaare Dybvad (born 1984)	2 May 2022	23 September 2025	3 years, 144 days	Social Democrats	Frederiksen I–II	
11		Rasmus Stoklund (born 1984)	23 September 2025	3 June 2026	253 days	Social Democrats	Frederiksen II	
12		Morten Bødskov (born 1970)	3 June 2026	Incumbent	96 days	Social Democrats	Frederiksen III	
