= Per Stig Møller =

Danish politician

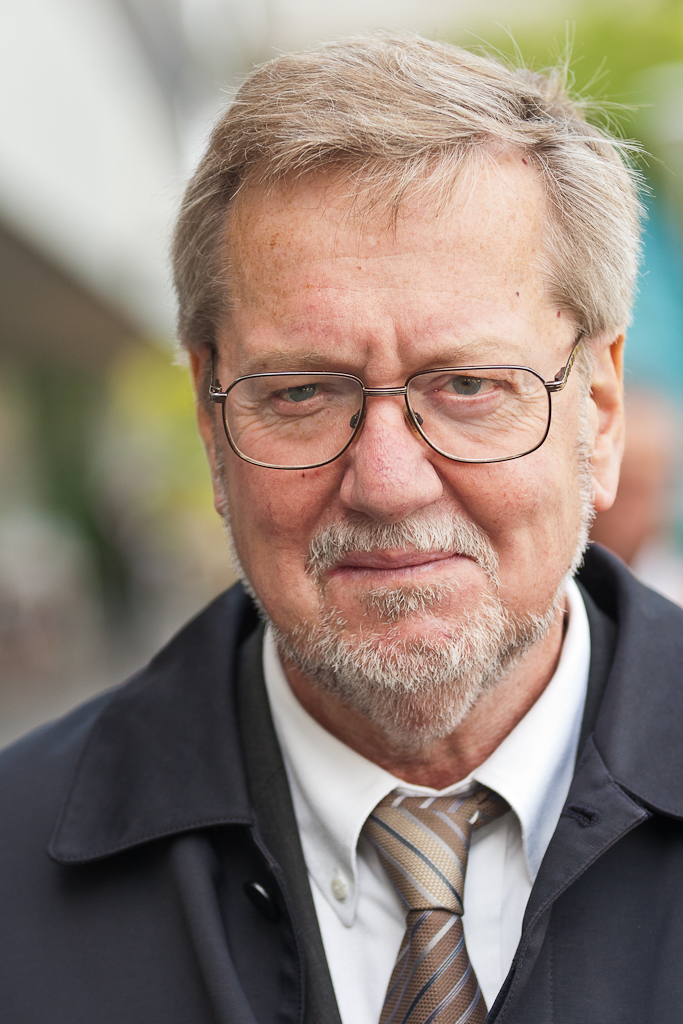
- Møller in 2011

Minister of Foreign Affairs
- In office 27 November 2001 – 23 February 2010
- Prime Minister: Anders Fogh Rasmussen; Lars Løkke Rasmussen
- Preceded by: Mogens Lykketoft
- Succeeded by: Lene Espersen

Minister of Culture
- In office 23 February 2010 – 3 October 2011
- Prime Minister: Lars Løkke Rasmussen
- Preceded by: Carina Christensen
- Succeeded by: Uffe Elbæk

Minister of Ecclesiastical Affairs
- In office 8 March 2011 – 3 October 2011
- Prime Minister: Lars Løkke Rasmussen
- Preceded by: Birthe Rønn Hornbech
- Succeeded by: Manu Sareen

Minister of the Environment
- In office 18 December 1990 – 25 January 1993
- Prime Minister: Poul Schlüter
- Preceded by: Lone Dybkjær
- Succeeded by: Svend Auken

Leader of the Conservative People’s Party
- In office 1997–1998
- Preceded by: Hans Engell
- Succeeded by: Pia Christmas-Møller

Personal details
- Born: 27 August 1942 (age 83) Frederiksberg, Denmark
- Party: Conservative People’s

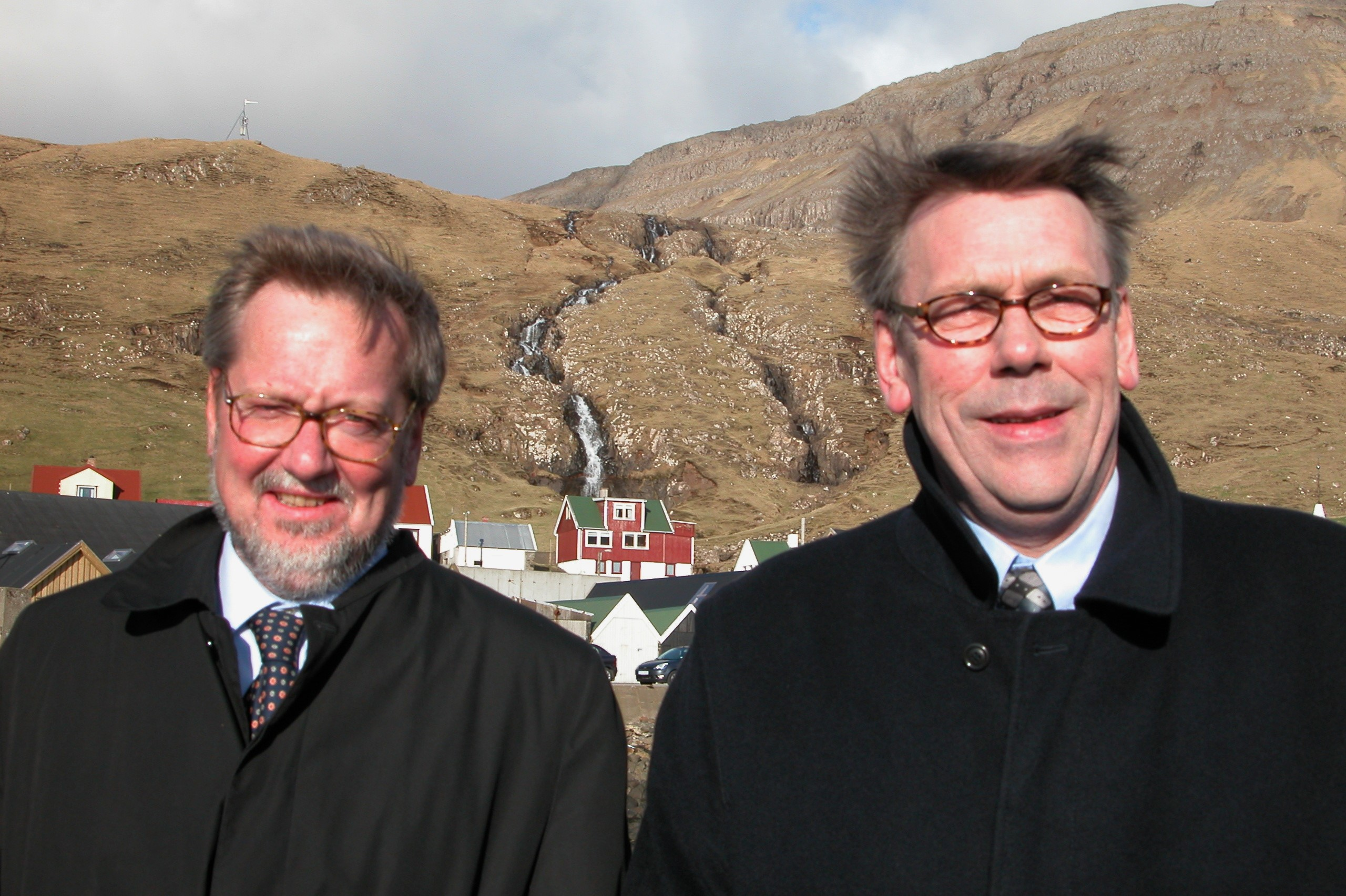
Per Stig Møller (left) and Jóannes Eidesgaard in Fámjin before signing the contract about Faroese-Danish relations in foreign policy

Per Stig Møller (Danish pronunciation: [ˈpʰɛɐ̯ ˈstiˀ ˈmølˀɐ]; born 27 August 1942) is a Danish politician. He was a member of the Folketing (Danish national parliament) for the Conservative People's Party from 1984 until 2015, and was Minister for the Environment from 18 December 1990 to 24 January 1993 as part of the Cabinet of Poul Schlüter IV and Foreign Minister from 27 November 2001 to 23 February 2010 as part of the Cabinet of Anders Fogh Rasmussen I, II and III, and the first Cabinet of Lars Løkke Rasmussen. From 23 February 2010 to 3 October 2011 he was Minister for Culture.

Per Stig Møller is the son of the former Finance Minister Poul Møller and journalist Lis Møller, who were both Members of Parliament.

== Education ==
Per Stig Møller completed his master's degree in comparative literature at the University of Copenhagen in 1967, and was awarded a dr.phil. (higher doctorate) in 1973 for his thesis Malte-Bruns litterære kritik og dens plads i transformationsprocessen mellem klassicisme og romantik i fransk litteraturhistorie 1800-1826 (Eng.: Literary criticism of Malte-Brun and its position in the transformation process between classicism and romanticism in French history of literature 1800-1826).

== Non-political career ==
- 1973 - 1974: Editor of culture in Danmarks Radio.
- 1974 - 1976: Lecturer at the University of Paris.
- 1974, 1976 - 1979: Vice president (souschef) at the department of culture and society at Danmarks Radio.
- 1979 - 1984: Working with the program manager at Danmarks Radio.
- 1985 - 1986: Vice president of Radiorådet, the leading organ of Danmarks Radio which is appointed by Folketinget.
- 1986 - 1987: President of Radiorådet.
- 1984 - 2001: Commentator at the newspaper Berlingske Tidende.

== Political career ==
- 1983 - 1989: President of Folkeligt Oplysningsforbund.
- 1984 – 2015: Member of Folketinget for the Conservative People's Party.
- 1985 - 1998: Member of hovedbestyrelsen, the leadership of the Conservative People's Party.
- 1987 - 2001: Member of the Council of Europe.
- 1990 - 1993: Minister for the Environment in the Cabinet of Poul Schlüter IV.
- 1994 - 2001: Member of Udenrigspolitisk Nævn, the committee for foreign policy.
- 1994 - 1996: President of Sikkerhedspolitisk Udvalg, the committee of security.
- 1997 - 1998: Leader of the Conservative People's Party, succeeding Hans Engell. He resigned after a poor result in the election in 1998.
- 1998 - 2001: Foreign policy spokesman for the Conservative People's Party.
- 2001 - 2010: Foreign Minister of Denmark
- 2010–2011: Culture Minister of Denmark
- 2011–2011: Minister for Ecclesiastical Affairs of Denmark

== Bibliography ==
- Synspunkter i konservatismen (anthology) (1968)
- Antikleksikon (with Preben Hasselbalch and Jens Winther) (1970)
- La Critique dramatique et littéraire de Malte-Brun (1971)
- Utopi og virkelighed (with Søren Krarup and Ebbe Reich) (1973)
- Malte-Bruns litterære kritik og dens plads i transformationsprocessen mellem klassicisme og romantik i fransk litteraturhistorie 1800-1826 (Doctor of Philosophy|Ph. D. thesis) (1973)
- Léopold Sédar Senghor: Mod en ny civilisation (commentary) (1973)
- Tøger Reenberg: Ars Poetica. Digte mellem to tider (commentary) (1973)
- Erotismen (1973) ISBN 8716007573
- København-Paris t/r (1973) ISBN 8741648587
- Tværsnit 1790 (anthology) (1974) ISBN 8700840416
- På Sporet af det forsvundne Menneske (1976) ISBN 8701301128
- Forfatternes Danmarkshistorie (editor) (1977) ISBN 8701658514
- Livet i Gøgereden (1978) ISBN 8702219948
- Fra Tid til Anden (1979) ISBN 8701846213
- Forfatternes kulturhistorie (editor) (1979) ISBN 8701817310
- Tro, Håb og Fællesskab (1980) ISBN 8700403911
- Forfatternes forfatterhistorie (editor) (1980) ISBN 8701998528
- Midt i Redeligheden (1981) ISBN 8702219913
- Orwells Håb og Frygt (1983) ISBN 8702219905
- Nat uden Daggry (1985) ISBN 8700858242
- Mulighedernes Samfund (with Bertel Haarder and Tom Høyem) (1985) ISBN 8701205145
- Stemmer fra Øst (1987) ISBN 8711115548
- Historien om Estland, Letland og Litauen (1990) ISBN 8711080329
- Kurs mod Katastrofer? (1993) ISBN 8702219999
- Miljøproblemer (1995) ISBN 8702220008
- Den naturlige Orden - Tolv år der flyttede Verden (1996) ISBN 8700255963
- Spor. Udvalgte Skrifter om det åbne Samfund og dets Værdier (1997) ISBN 8700297429
- Magt og Afmagt (1999) ISBN 8714295342
- Munk (2000) ISBN 8700345083
- Mere Munk (2003) ISBN 8702017547
- Samtale fremme forståelsen (2010) ISBN 8702103753
- Kaj Munk, digter, præst og urostifter (2014) ISBN 9788702176704
- Aldrig skal Danmark dø (2015) ISBN 9788774672128

Political offices
| Preceded by Lone Dybkjær | Minister for the Environment of Denmark; 1990–1993 | Succeeded by Svend Auken |
| Preceded by Mogens Lykketoft | Foreign Minister of Denmark; 2001–2010 | Succeeded by Lene Espersen |
| Preceded by Carina Christensen | Culture Minister of Denmark; 2010–2011 | Succeeded by Uffe Elbæk |
| Preceded by Birthe Rønn Hornbech | Minister for Ecclesiastical Affairs of Denmark; March–October 2011 | Succeeded by Manu Sareen |
Party political offices
| Preceded by Hans Engell | Leader of the Conservative People's Party; 1997–1998 | Succeeded by Pia Christmas-Møller |
