= Mariann Fischer Boel =

Danish politician

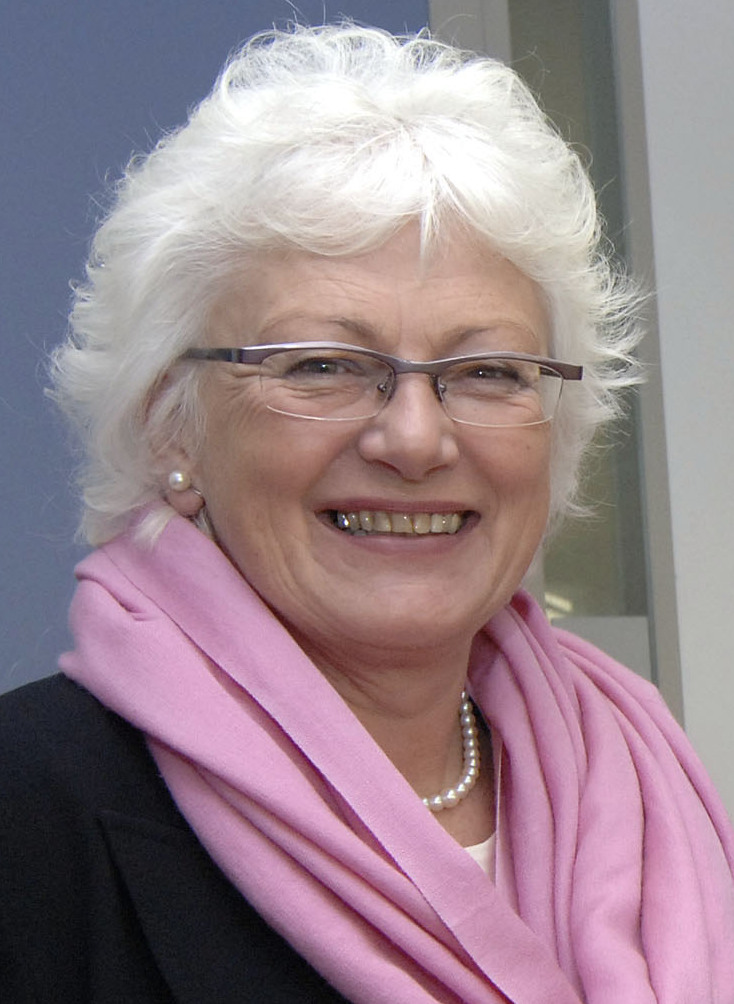
- Fischer Boel in 2005

European Commissioner for Agriculture and Rural Development
- In office 22 November 2004 – 9 February 2010
- President: José Manuel Barroso
- Preceded by: Franz Fischler; Sandra Kalniete (Agriculture, Rural Development and Fisheries)
- Succeeded by: Dacian Cioloş

Minister for Food, Agriculture and Fisheries
- In office 27 November 2001 – 2 August 2004
- Prime Minister: Anders Fogh Rasmussen
- Preceded by: Ritt Bjerregaard
- Succeeded by: Hans Christian Schmidt

Personal details
- Born: 15 April 1943 (age 82) Åsum, Denmark
- Party: Venstre

Mariann Fischer Boel (Danish pronunciation: [mɑʁiˈæn ˈfiɕɐ ˈpoˀl]; born 15 April 1943) is a Danish politician, who served as European Commissioner for Agriculture and Rural Development from 2004 to 2009. A member of the Venstre party, she had previously been minister of agriculture and foods since 2002, in the government of Anders Fogh Rasmussen.

== In Office ==
=== EU Commissioner for Agriculture (2004-2010) ===
In 2004 Fischer Boel became EU Commissioner for Agriculture. During her tenure, preparations were made to reform the Common Market Organization for Sugar or EU sugar quotas system. This consisted of restructuring the sector to make it competitive in a liberalized market.

In 2008, she was given the European Taxpayers' Award from the Taxpayers' Association of Europe for her decision to abolish export refunds for exports of live cattle from the EU, and for her ongoing efforts to improve the transparency of agricultural payments.

In 2008, she was presented with the Danish European Movement's prize for "European of the Year".

In 2008, she was awarded the Wine Personality of the Year by the International Wine Challenge, which said, about her efforts to modernize the European wine industry, "family vineyards might have been pulled up and the family winemaking tradition lost had it not been for the intrepid heroine from the north".

Political offices
| Preceded by Ritt Bjerregaard | Minister for Food, Agriculture and Fisheries; 2001–2004 | Succeeded by Hans Christian Schmidt |
| Preceded by Poul Nielson | Danish European Commissioner; 2004–2009 | Succeeded by Connie Hedegaard |
| Preceded by Franz Fischler; Sandra Kalniete as European Commissioner for Agriculture, Rural Development and Fisheries | European Commissioner for Agriculture and Rural Development; 2004–2009 | Succeeded by Dacian Cioloş |
