= Recommendation Concerning the Status of Higher Education Teaching Personnel =

UNESCO instrument

The 1997 UNESCO Recommendation Concerning the Status of Higher Education Teaching Personnel is the international instrument that sets out the norms and standards for educators working in universities and institutions of higher education. The Recommendation is the only international instrument setting out norms and standards that deals exclusively with educators within universities and institutions of higher education, and as such it is of unique importance.

== Process of Formation ==
The formulation process for the Recommendation involved extensive consultation with experts and member states of UNESCO (the United Nations Educational, Scientific and Cultural Organization). As the Recommendation concerned employment conditions, there was also extensive consultation with the ILO (International Labor Organization). The Recommendation was adopted by unanimous vote of the General Conference of UNESCO, on 11 November 1997.

In UNESCO usage, a recommendation is a formal international instrument accepted by the member states of UNESCO (UNESCO, 1981). As is generally the case with international instruments, the Recommendation is soft law, that is, the enforcement of the norms and standards within the Recommendation is through the force of moral persuasion. There is, however, potential for individual governments to translate the Recommendation into hard law, through individual legislation.

The rationale for the Recommendation, as expressed in the Preamble, is that higher education plays a crucial role in both developed and developing societies. It is therefore of social importance to have specific norms and standards regarding employment and pay conditions for educators working within the higher education sector.

== Compliance with the Recommendation ==
There is ongoing debate as to how effective the Recommendation has been. Dr Taye Assefa (2007) and Dr James Page (2007) have recently argued that there is widespread ignorance of the Recommendation and the standards the Recommendation sets out. Dr Page suggests that a range of measures, specifically supporting legislation by individual countries, may be necessary to ensure compliance with the standards set down in the Recommendation.

== See also ==
- Academic freedom
