= Marianne Jelved =

Danish politician (born 1943)

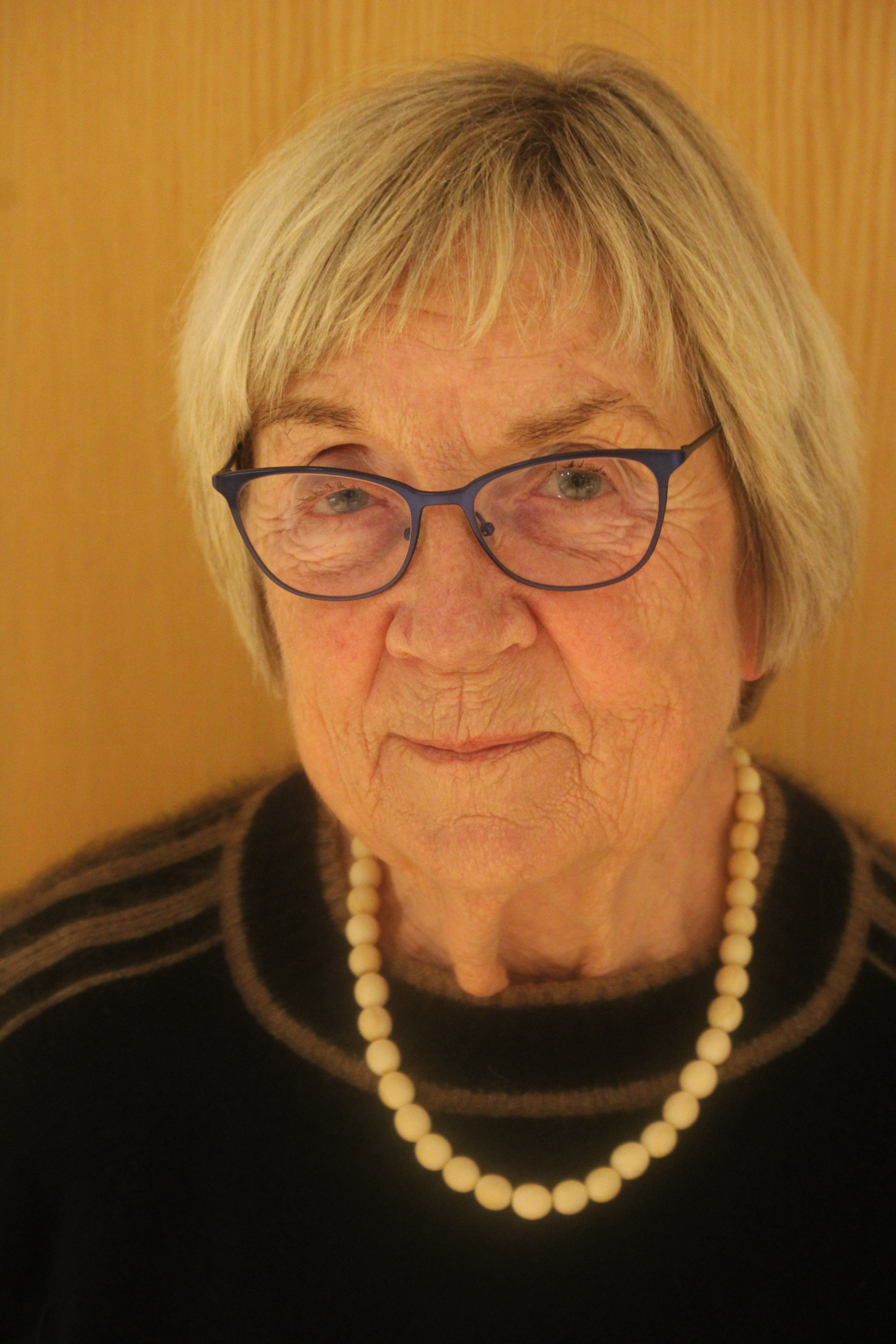
- Jelved in 2026

Minister of Economic Affairs
- In office 25 January 1993 – 27 September 1994
- Prime Minister: Poul Nyrup Rasmussen

Minister of Economic Affairs and Nordic Cooperation
- In office 27 September 1994 – 27 November 2001
- Prime Minister: Poul Nyrup Rasmussen

Minister for Culture and Ecclesiastical Affairs
- In office 6 December 2012 – 28 June 2015
- Prime Minister: Helle Thorning-Schmidt

Member of the Folketing
- In office 21 September 1994 – 2 November 2022
- Constituency: North Jutland
- In office 8 December 1987 – 1 December 1993
- Constituency: North Jutland (1990-1993); Roskilde (1987-1990)

Personal details
- Born: 5 September 1943 (age 83) Charlottenlund, Denmark
- Party: Danish Social Liberal Party

Marianne Bruus Jelved (née Hirsbro, born 5 September 1943) is a Danish politician and bureaucrat who is a member of the Folketing for the Danish Social Liberal Party. She was elected into parliament in the 1994 Danish general election and had previously sat in parliament from 1987 to 1993. She is a former Minister of Economic Affairs, Nordic Cooperation, Culture and Ecclesiastical Affairs.

== Background ==
Jelved is educated as a teacher and has a master's degree in education from the Danish School of Education. She worked as a primary school teacher for 22 years.

== Political career ==
Jelved was in the municipal council of Gundsø Municipality from 1982 to 1989.

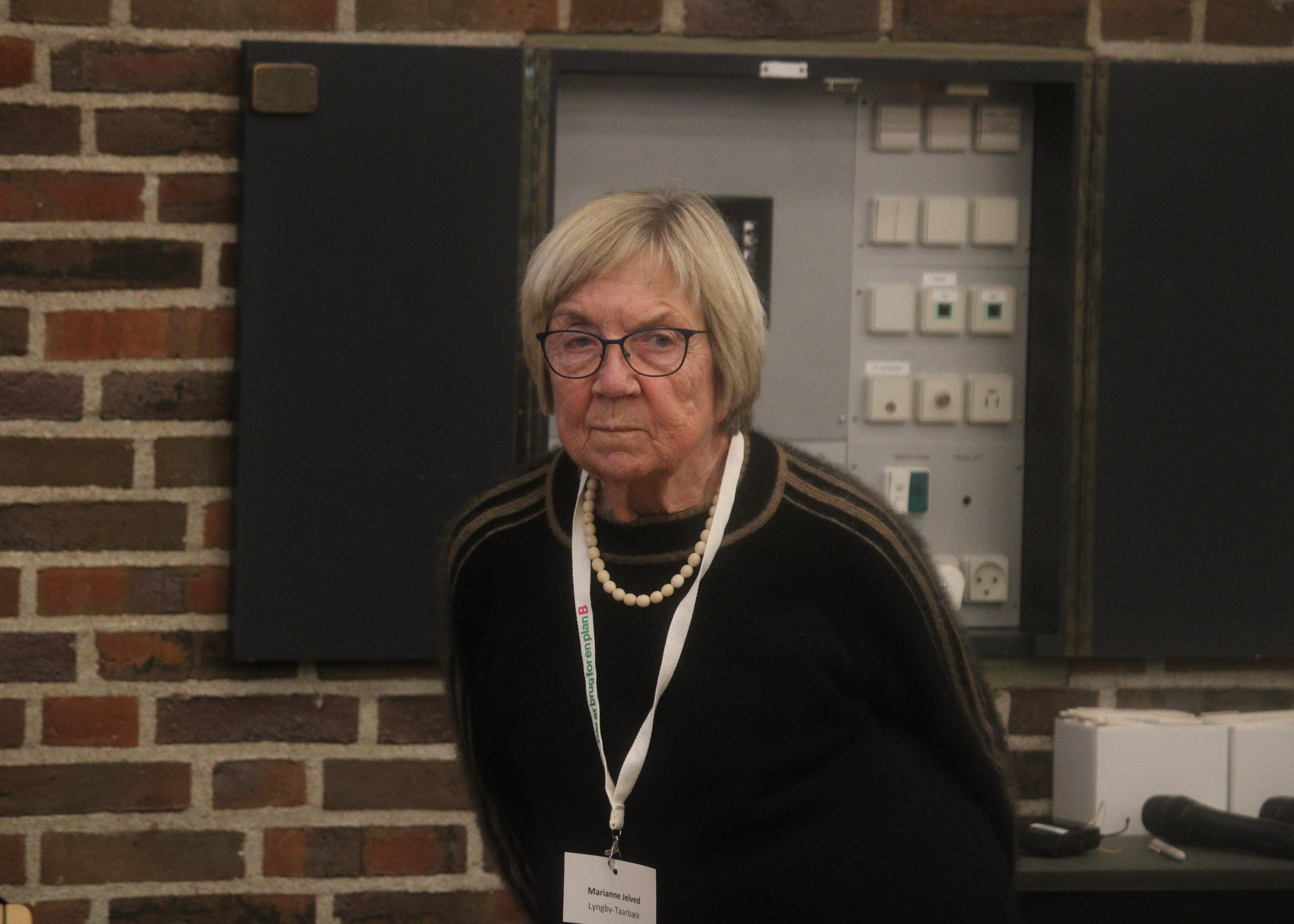
Jelved at her party's 2026 new year's meeting in Nyborg

She was elected to the Parliament of Denmark in 1987 for the Danish Social Liberal Party (Radikale Venstre). In 1990 she became political leader of the party. During the 1990s she served as Minister of Economic Affairs (1993–2001) and Minister for Nordic Cooperation (1994–2001) in two Social Democratic governments. In 2007 MP Naser Khader and MEP Anders Samuelsen broke away from the party in protest to form the New Alliance, today known as Liberal Alliance. Jelved resigned as political leader in 2007 following a drop in opinion polls and criticism from within the party. She remained an MP, serving as Minister of Culture from 2012–2015 and Minister of Ecclesiastical Affairs from 2014–2015 in Prime Minister Helle Thorning-Schmidt's three-way government coalition. As of the 2019 elections, she is the oldest member of parliament.

== Bibliography ==
- Alt har sin pris (1999, ISBN 8711113677)
- Jelveds Danmark (2006, ISBN 9788790333201)

== Notes ==
Political offices
Preceded by Thor Pedersen	Minister of Economic Affairs; 1993 — 2001	Succeeded by Bendt Bendtsen
Preceded by Flemming Kofod-Svendsen	Minister of Nordic Cooperation; 1994 — 2001	Succeeded by Bendt Bendtsen
Preceded by Uffe Elbæk	Minister of Culture; 2012 — 2015	Succeeded by Bertel Haarder
Preceded by Manu Sareen	Minister for Ecclesiastical Affairs; 2014 — 2015	Succeeded by Bertel Haarder
Party political offices
Preceded by Niels Helveg Petersen	Political leader of the Danish Social Liberal Party; 1990 — 2007	Succeeded by Margrethe Vestager
