= Connie Hedegaard =

Danish politician (born 1960)

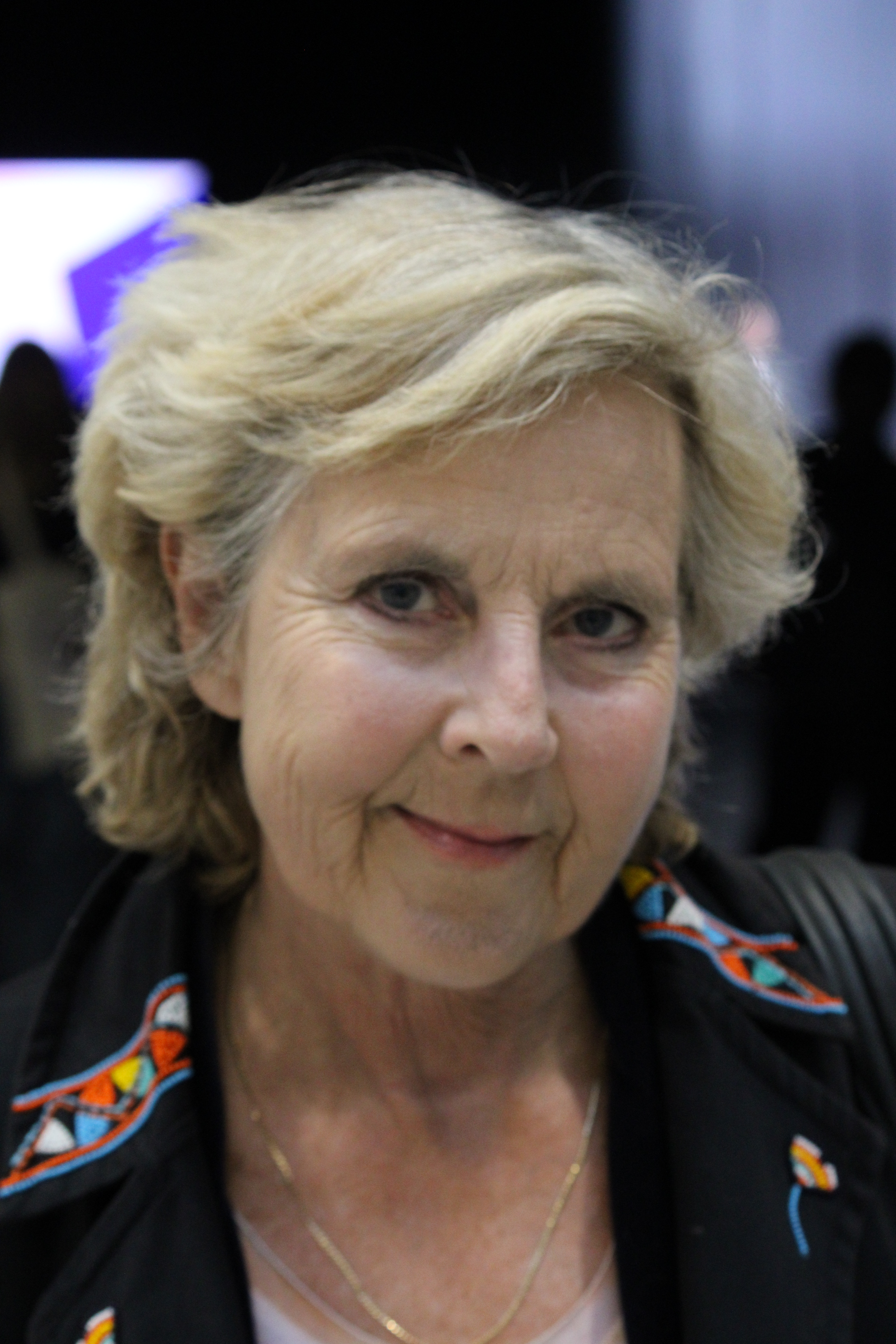
- Hedegaard in 2025

European Commissioner for Climate Action
- In office 9 February 2010 – 31 October 2014
- President: José Manuel Barroso
- Preceded by: Position established
- Succeeded by: Miguel Arias Cañete (Climate Action and Energy)

Minister for Climate and Energy
- In office 23 November 2007 – 24 November 2009
- Prime Minister: Anders Fogh Rasmussen; Lars Løkke Rasmussen
- Preceded by: Position established
- Succeeded by: Lykke Friis

Minister for Nordic Cooperation
- In office 18 February 2005 – 23 November 2007
- Prime Minister: Anders Fogh Rasmussen
- Preceded by: Flemming Hansen
- Succeeded by: Bertel Haarder

Minister for the Environment
- In office 2 August 2004 – 23 November 2007
- Prime Minister: Anders Fogh Rasmussen
- Preceded by: Hans Christian Schmidt
- Succeeded by: Troels Lund Poulsen

Personal details
- Born: 15 October 1960 (age 65) Holbæk, Denmark
- Party: Conservative People's Party
- Education: University of Copenhagen

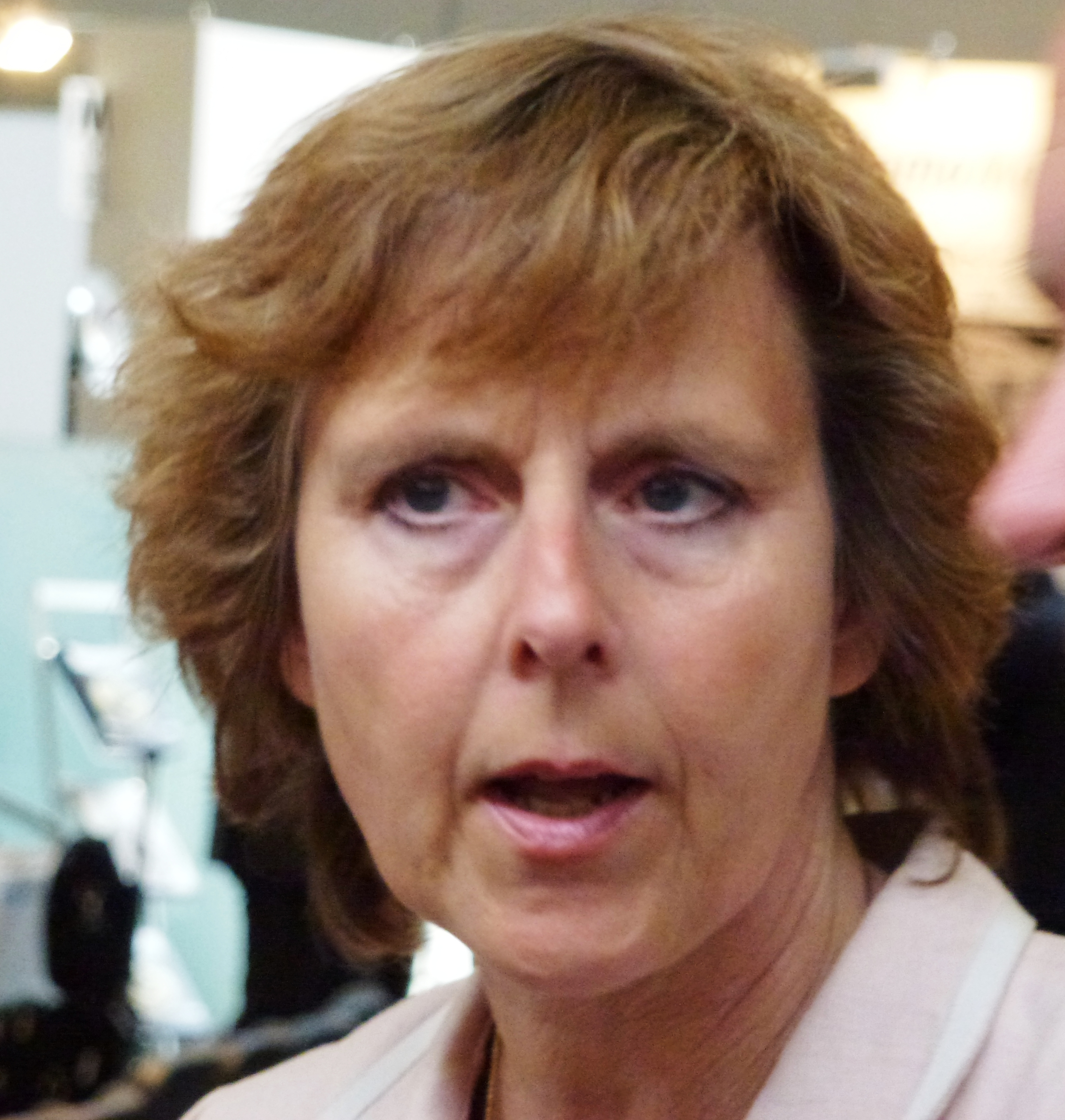
Connie Hedegaard 2012

Connie Hedegaard Koksbang (born 15 September 1960) is a Danish politician and public intellectual. She was European Commissioner for Climate Action in the (second Barroso) European Commission from 10 February 2010 through 31 October 2014.

On behalf of Denmark, Hedegaard hosted the UN Climate Change Conference in Copenhagen 2009. She was Danish Minister for Climate and Energy from 23 November 2007 as a member of the Cabinet of Anders Fogh Rasmussen III and that of Lars Løkke Rasmussen and had been the Danish Minister for the Environment from 2 August 2004 to 23 November 2007, as a member of the Cabinet of Anders Fogh Rasmussen I and II.

In Denmark, Hedegaard is a member of the Conservative People's Party (DKF), and elected member of parliament (Folketing) from 10 January 1984 to 3 October 1990 and again in the 2005 Danish parliamentary election. Prior to becoming a minister, she worked as a journalist at DR, the Danish national broadcaster.

== Education and early career ==
Connie Hedegaard holds an MA in Literature and History. She has been a member of the Conservative Party and active in government on and off since 1984, when she was elected as the hitherto youngest member of the Folketing, the Danish national parliament, where she sat for six years. In 1990, she left politics to pursue a career in journalism. Over the next 14 years, she worked as a journalist at the newspaper Berlingske Tidende, took the post of Director of DR Radio News, and was the anchor for Deadline, a Danish TV news program.

== Political career ==
=== Member of the Danish government, 2004–2010 ===
Diving back into politics in 2004, she became Minister of the Environment. A year later, she became Minister for Nordic Cooperation. After the November 2007 general election, she was chosen as Minister for Climate and Energy. In May 2008, she told Denmark, "Sustainable economic growth is an attainable objective. The Nordic Region has made great progress with solutions based on environmental technology, and some day it will be possible to stockpile energy generated from renewable sources such as windmills, and to run vehicles purely on excess energy."

Hedegaard was also in charge of preparing and hosting the United Nations Climate Change Conference 2009 in Copenhagen.

From 2007, Hedegaard was behind Denmark's energy policies. In April, she signed an action plan with India on renewable energy. One notable achievement was her role in introducing Denmark's Energy Policy 2008–2011. The policy made her country the first in the world to commit to an overall energy reduction, not just a reduction in greenhouse gas emissions. It includes the following language.

- Energy Savings: A target of 2% reduction of total energy use from 2006 levels by 2011, and 4% by 2020.
- Renewable Energy: Increased biomass/waste and wind energy and provide large, annual subsidies for solar and wave energy. Regarding wind power, plans include support for two 200 MW offshore wind farms that are scheduled to begin energy production in 2012. Additionally, money has been set aside for informational and labeling campaigns aimed at replacing oil-fired furnaces with heat pumps.
- Energy taxes: Higher taxes on CO_{2} emitters, as well as a new tax on emitters of nitrogen oxide (NO_{x}).
- Energy technology: Doubled funding for energy technology R&D.
- Transport: Extended the electric vehicle tax exemption to 2012 and introduced a tax exemption for hydrogen vehicles. Planned a tests scheme for electric vehicles. Set the goal to use 5.75% biofuels for all land transit by 2010 and 10% by 2020, in line with EU targets.

=== European Commissioner for Climate Action, 2010–2014 ===
Taking up her new position at the European Commission on 10 February 2010, Hedegaard stressed the importance of climate change in the 21st century. She hoped that by the end of her five-year term, Europe would be the most climate friendly region in the world. Her priorities would be to implement the European Climate and Energy package and to continue her efforts towards an ambitious international climate agreement.

According to the mandate outlined by President Barroso, her principal responsibilities as Commissioner for Climate Action was to:

- Help the European Union to meet its targets for 2020 and beyond to reduce greenhouse gas emissions;
- Develop and implement the European Union Emission Trading Scheme and to promote its links with other carbon trading systems with the ultimate aim of building an international carbon trading market,
- Help promote the development and demonstration of low carbon and adaptation technologies and to develop a strong science and economic base for EU climate policy;
- Have cross cutting responsibility for developing adaptation to climate change inside the EU and for working with other Commissioners, to ensure that an appropriate climate dimension is present in all Community policies;
- Build on the White Paper on adaptation to climate change and to help develop adaptation strategies across all policy areas.

In order to carry out her responsibilities, Hedegaard was in charge of the newly created Directorate-General for Climate Action which builds on the climate directorate which was previously in the Directorate-General for Environment.

== Life after politics ==
In 2025, Hedegaard was appointed to the World Health Organization (WHO) Regional Office for Europe’s Pan-European Commission on Climate and Health (PECCH), chaired by Katrín Jakobsdóttir.

== Other activities ==
=== International organizations ===
- European Investment Bank (EIB), Member of the Climate and Environment Advisory Council (since 2021)

=== Corporate boards ===
- Danfoss Group, Member of the Board
- Volkswagen, Member of the Sustainability Council
- Nordex, Member of the Supervisory Board
- BBVA, Member of the Board

=== Non-profit organizations ===
- Africa Europe Foundation (AEF), Member of the High-Level Group of Personalities on Africa-Europe Relations (since 2020)
- Friends of Europe, Member of the Board of Trustees (since 2020)
- Aarhus University, chairman of the Board
- Bilderberg Group, Member of the Steering Committee
- Organisation for Economic Co-operation and Development (OECD), Round Table on Sustainable Development (RTSD), Member
- KR Foundation, chairwoman of the Board
- European Climate Foundation, Member of the Supervisory Board
- European Council on Foreign Relations (ECFR), Member
- European Policy Centre (EPC), Member of the Advisory Council

Political offices
Preceded by Hans Christian Schmidt	Minister for the Environment; 2004–2007	Succeeded by Troels Lund Poulsen
Preceded by Flemming Hansen	Minister for Nordic Cooperation; 2005–2007	Succeeded by Bertel Haarder
New office	Minister for Climate and Energy; 2007–2009	Succeeded by Lykke Friis
Preceded by Mariann Fischer Boel	Danish European Commissioner; 2010–2014	Succeeded by Margrethe Vestager
New office	European Commissioner for Climate Action; 2010–2014	Succeeded by Miguel Arias Cañete as European Commissioner for Climate Action and Energy
Awards and achievements
Preceded by (Denmark) Emmelie de Forest	European of the Year (by the Danish European Movement); 2014	Succeeded by (Denmark) Helle Thorning-Schmidt
