= Minister for Culture (Denmark) =

Danish government minister

Minister of Culture
- Kulturminister
- State coat of arms of the Kingdom of Denmark

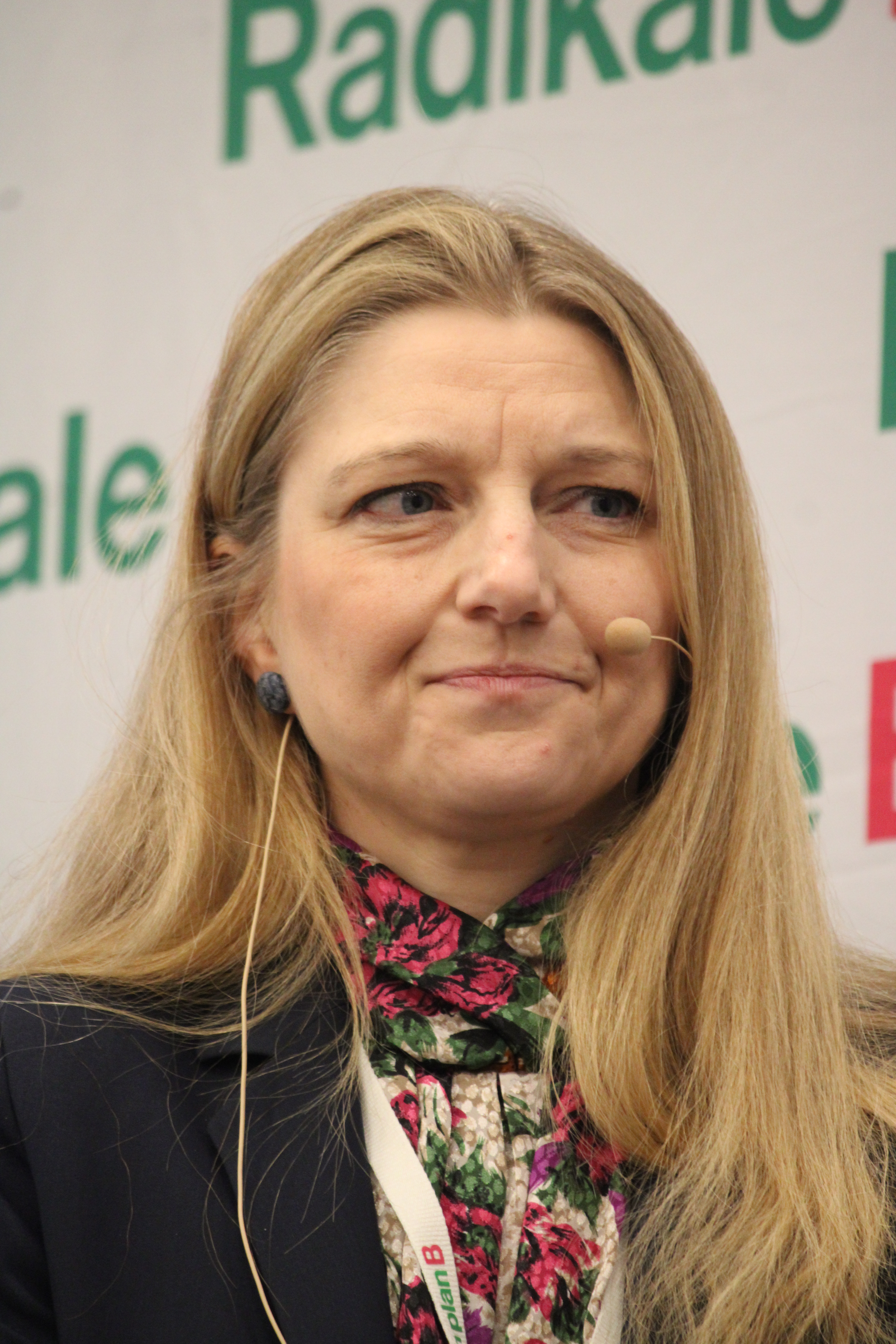
- Incumbent; Zenia Stampe since 3 June 2026
- Ministry of Culture
- Type: Minister
- Member of: Cabinet; State Council
- Reports to: the Prime minister
- Seat: Slotsholmen
- Appointer: The Monarch (on the advice of the Prime Minister)
- Precursor: Minister of Ecclesiastical Affairs
- Formation: 19 September 1961; 64 years ago
- First holder: Julius Bomholt
- Succession: depending on the order in the State Council
- Deputy: Permanent Secretary
- Salary: 1.624.503,02 DKK (€217,931), in 2026
- Website: Official website

The Danish minister of culture (Danish: Kulturminister) is the political minister office responsible for culture, head of the Ministry of Culture.

The political responsibility for culture, as well as church and education, was with the kultus minister from 1848 to 1916 when that post was split up into the posts of education minister and church minister. From 1916 the church minister had political responsibility for culture, until the post of Minister for Culture was created in 1961.

The office was titled Minister for Cultural Affairs (Minister for kulturelle anliggender) from 1961 to 1988, Culture and Communications Minister (Kultur- og kommunikationsminister) from 1986 to 1988, and Minister for Culture (Kulturminister) from 1988 to the present (as of 2025).

== List of ministers ==
No.	Portrait	Name (born-died)	Term of office			Political party	Government	Ref.
No.	Portrait	Name (born-died)	Took office	Left office	Time in office	Political party	Government	Ref.
Minister of Cultural Affairs (Minister for Kulturelle Anliggender)
1		Julius Bomholt (1896–1969)	19 September 1961	26 September 1964	3 years, 7 days	Social Democrats	Krag I	
2		Hans Sølvhøj (1919–1989)	26 September 1964	28 November 1966	2 years, 63 days	Social Democrats	Krag II	
3		Bodil Koch (1903–1972)	28 November 1966	2 February 1968	1 year, 66 days	Social Democrats	Krag II	
4		Kristen Helveg Petersen (1909–1997)	2 February 1968	11 October 1971	3 years, 251 days	Social Liberal	Baunsgaard	
5		Niels Matthiasen (1924–1980)	11 October 1971	19 December 1973	2 years, 69 days	Social Democrats	Krag III; Jørgensen I	
6		Nathalie Lind (1919–1999)	19 December 1973	13 February 1975	1 year, 56 days	Venstre	Hartling	
(5)		Niels Matthiasen (1924–1980)	13 February 1975	16 February 1980 #	5 years, 3 days	Social Democrats	Jørgensen II–III–IV	
7		Lise Østergaard (1924–1996)	28 February 1980	10 September 1982	2 years, 194 days	Social Democrats	Jørgensen IV–V	
8		Mimi Jakobsen (born 1948)	10 September 1982	12 March 1986	3 years, 183 days	Centre Democrats	Schlüter I	
9		Hans Peter Clausen (1933–2014)	12 March 1986	10 September 1987	1 year, 182 days	Conservative People's Party	Schlüter I	
Minister of Culture and Communications (Kultur- og kommunikationsminister)
(9)		Hans Peter Clausen (1933–2014)	10 September 1987	3 June 1988	267 days	Conservative People's Party	Schlüter II	
Minister of Culture (Kulturminister)
10		Ole Vig Jensen (1936–2016)	3 June 1988	18 December 1990	2 years, 198 days	Social Liberal	Schlüter III	
11		Grethe Rostbøll (1941–2021)	18 December 1990	24 January 1993	2 years, 37 days	Conservative People's Party	Schlüter IV	
12		Jytte Hilden (born 1942)	25 January 1993	30 December 1996	3 years, 340 days	Social Democrats	P. N. Rasmussen I–II	
13		Ebbe Lundgaard (1944–2009)	30 December 1996	23 March 1998	1 year, 83 days	Social Liberal	P. N. Rasmussen III	
14		Elsebeth Gerner Nielsen (born 1960)	23 March 1998	27 November 2001	3 years, 249 days	Social Liberal	P. N. Rasmussen IV	
15		Brian Mikkelsen (born 1966)	27 November 2001	10 September 2008	6 years, 288 days	Conservative People's Party	A. F. Rasmussen I–II–III	
16		Carina Christensen (born 1972)	10 September 2008	23 February 2010	1 year, 166 days	Conservative People's Party	A. F. Rasmussen III; L. L. Rasmussen I	
17		Per Stig Møller (born 1942)	23 February 2010	3 October 2011	1 year, 222 days	Conservative People's Party	L. L. Rasmussen I	
18		Uffe Elbæk (born 1954)	3 October 2011	6 December 2012	1 year, 64 days	Social Liberal	Thorning-Schmidt I	
19		Marianne Jelved (born 1943)	6 December 2012	28 June 2015	2 years, 204 days	Social Liberal	Thorning-Schmidt I–II	
20		Bertel Haarder (born 1944)	28 June 2015	28 November 2016	1 year, 153 days	Venstre	L. L. Rasmussen II	
21		Mette Bock (born 1957)	28 November 2016	27 June 2019	2 years, 211 days	Liberal Alliance	L. L. Rasmussen III	
22		Joy Mogensen (born 1980)	27 June 2019	16 August 2021	2 years, 50 days	Social Democrats	Frederiksen I	
23		Ane Halsboe-Jørgensen (born 1983)	16 August 2021	15 December 2022	1 year, 121 days	Social Democrats	Frederiksen I	
24		Jakob Engel-Schmidt (born 1983)	15 December 2022	3 June 2026	3 years, 170 days	Moderates	Frederiksen II	
25		Zenia Stampe (born 1979)	3 June 2026	Incumbent	96 days	Social Liberal	Frederiksen III	
