= Birthe Rønn Hornbech =

Danish politician (born 1943)

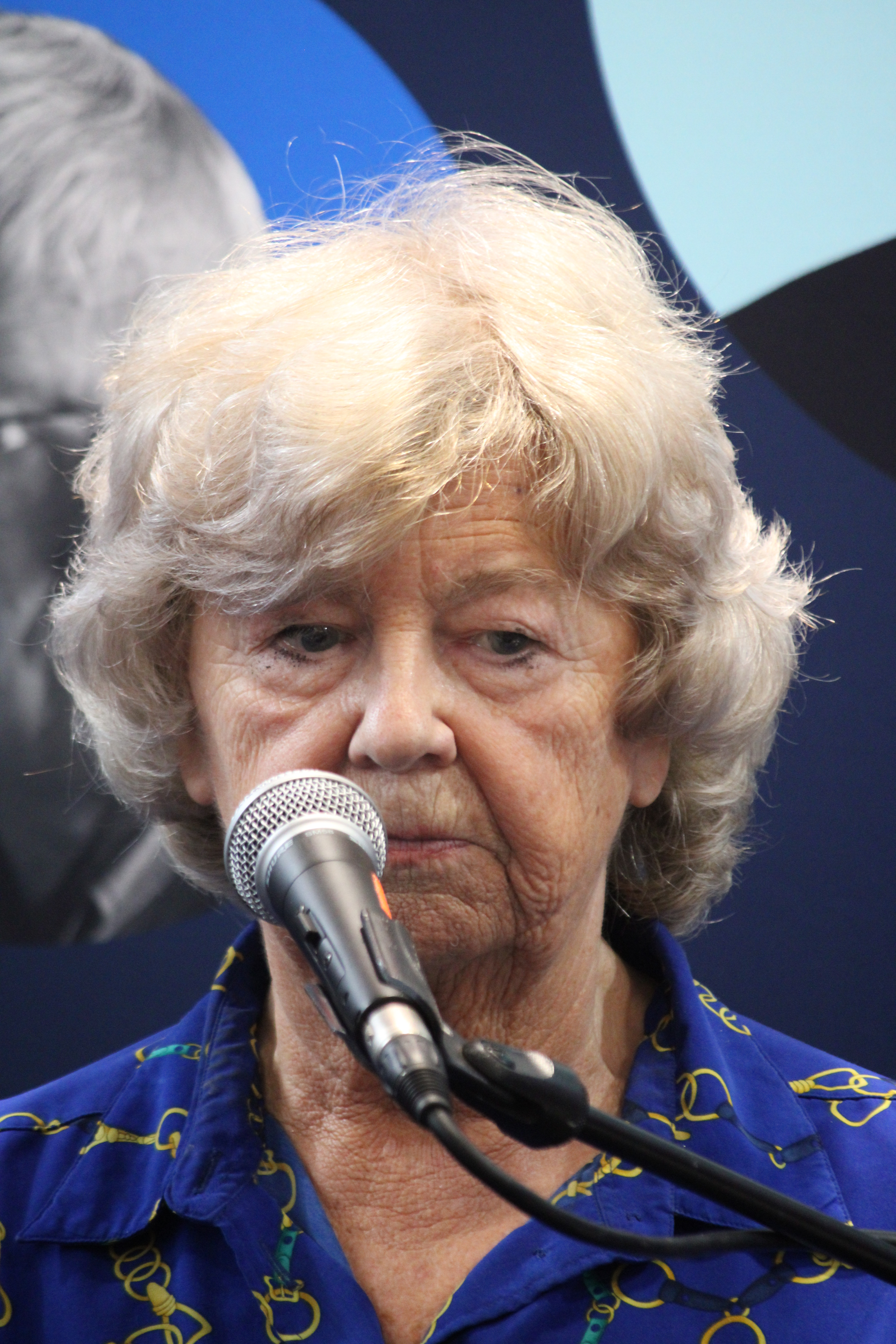
Rønn Hornbech in 2025

Birthe Johanne Sparrevohn Rønn Hornbech (born 18 October 1943 in Copenhagen) is a Danish politician, member of the Folketing (the national parliament of Denmark) for Venstre, the liberal party, elected in the constituency of Køge, and former Minister for Refugees, Immigrants and Integration and for Ecclesiastical Affairs.

Hornbech graduated as cand.jur. (Master of Laws) from the University of Copenhagen in 1971. After that, she worked as a clerk at the Police and in 1981 she was promoted to deputy police commissioner. She was first elected to the Folketing in 1984.

Hornbech is known for her pronounced views and has on numerous occasions disagreed with the leadership of her own party; for instance, she voted against an increase of public surveillance.

Following the 2007 election, she became minister, although having previously denied offers of such appointment on more than one occasion.

In 2010, Hornbech came under public scrutiny as the Minister of Integration, when it was discovered that young stateless Palestinians living in Denmark were being illegally denied Danish citizenship, with her knowledge. On 8 March 2011, she was fired from her ministries because of this.

== Bibliography ==
Hornbech has expressed her views and her experiences in a number of books:

- Og så gik, 1990
- Udlændinge i Danmark, 1993
- Så gik der politik i det, Gyldendal, 1997
- En lige venstre, Gyldendal, 2001
- Ret og rimeligt, Gyldendal, 2004, ISBN 9788702027914 (Hornbech deals out clips on the ears of politicians, voters and non-voters)
- Kirsten Jacobsen: På livet løs - En samtale mellem Lise Nørgaard og Birthe Rønn Hornbech, Gyldendal, 2004 (a conversation with Lise Nørgaard)
- Tale er guld, Gyldendal, 2006, ISBN 9788702107814
- Fra krigsbarn til folkevalgt, DR Multimedie, 2007
- Gud, Grundtvig, Grundlov, Gyldendal, 2010, ISBN 9788702098167 (about N. F. S. Grundtvig)
- Det evigt menneskelige, Gyldendal, 2014, ISBN 9788702149715 (fairy tales by Hans Christian Andersen)
- Politierindringer, Gyldendal, 2018, ISBN 9788702260298 (about her 37 years in the police force)

Political offices
| Preceded by Bertel Haarder | Minister for Ecclesiastical Affairs of Denmark; 23 November 2007 – 8 March 2011 | Succeeded by Per Stig Møller |
| Preceded by Rikke Hvilshøj | Minister for Refugees, Immigrants and Integration; 23 November 2007 – 8 March 2011 | Succeeded by Søren Pind |
