= Lars Barfoed =

Danish politician

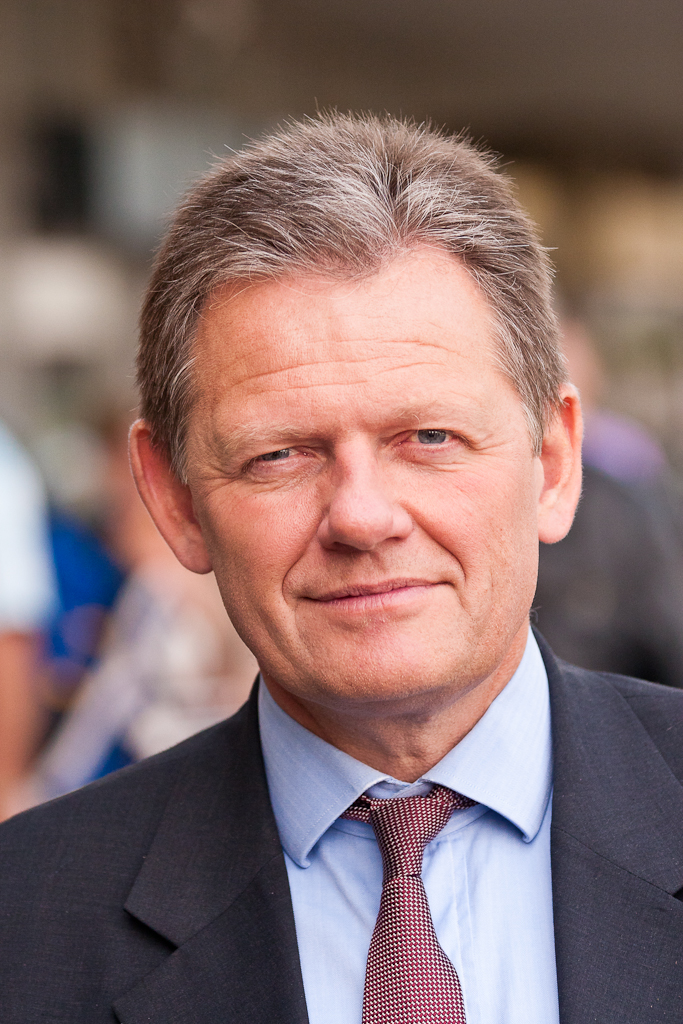

Leader of the Conservative People's Party
- In office 14 January 2011 – 6 August 2014
- Preceded by: Lene Espersen
- Succeeded by: Søren Pape Poulsen

Deputy Prime Minister of Denmark
- In office 13 January 2011 – 3 October 2011
- Prime Minister: Lars Løkke Rasmussen
- Preceded by: Lene Espersen
- Succeeded by: Margrethe Vestager

Minister of Justice
- In office 23 February 2010 – 3 October 2011
- Prime Minister: Lars Løkke Rasmussen
- Preceded by: Brian Mikkelsen
- Succeeded by: Morten Bødskov

Personal details
- Born: 4 July 1957 (age 69) Frederiksberg, Denmark
- Party: Conservative People's Party
- Education: University of Copenhagen

Lars Barfoed (Danish pronunciation: [ˈlɑːs ˈpɑːfoˀð]; born 4 July 1957) is a Danish politician representing the Conservative People's Party and was the party's leader from 2011 to 6 August 2014. He was Justice Minister of Denmark from February 2010 to October 2011, and Deputy Prime Minister of Denmark from January to October 2011. He also served as Minister for Family and Consumer Affairs from 18 February 2005 to 14 December 2006.

A report from Rigsrevisionen had criticized the food quality inspections which is his ministry's responsibility, as well as the information which Barfoed had passed on to Folketinget about the problems. The Danish People's Party announced that it no longer had confidence in him on 13 December, meaning that there was a risk that a majority in the Folketing no longer supporting Barfoed. Barfoed resigned his office the same day with effect from 14 December. Later on it was concluded from the report that the situation only had become better while Barfoed was in office, and that the problems was dating back to former Minister of Food, Agriculture and Fisheries Ritt Bjerregaard. He was Minister for Transportation from September 2008 to February 2010.

On 14 January 2011, Lars Barfoed succeeded Lene Espersen as political leader of the Conservative People's Party. Immediately after his election, he announced his decision to distance the party from the Danish People's Party, and ruled out being in a coalition within the government. He stated this was in part due to the parties' attitudes toward the European Union, stating that his party wanted to strengthen international cooperation with the EU while the DPP didn't. His term ended on 6 August 2014. He was succeeded by Søren Pape Poulsen. In August 2023, he left the Conservative People's Party, joining the Moderates later that month.

Political offices
Preceded by Henriette Kjær	Minister for Family and Consumer Affairs; 18 February 2005 – 14 December 2006	Succeeded by Carina Christensen
Preceded by Carina Christensen	Minister for Transportation; 10 September 2008 – 23 February 2010	Succeeded by Hans Christian Schmidt
Preceded by Brian Mikkelsen	Justice Minister of Denmark; 23 February 2010 – 3 October 2011	Succeeded by Morten Bødskov
Political offices
Preceded by Lene Espersen	Leader of the Conservative People's Party; 2011—2014	Succeeded by Søren Pape Poulsen
