= Minister for Family and Consumer Affairs (Denmark) =

Former Danish political office

- Minister for Familie- og Forbrugeranliggender
- State Coat of Arms of the Kingdom of Denmark

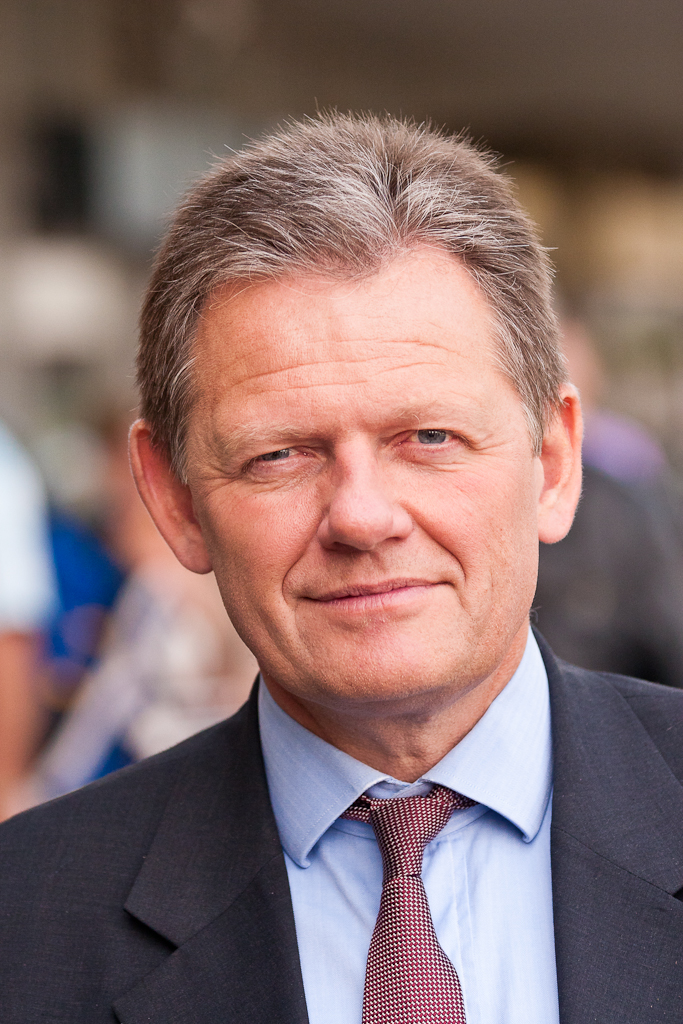
- Longest serving Lars Barfoed; 18 February 2005 – 14 December 2006
- Ministry for Family and Consumer Affairs
- Member of: the cabinet
- Appointer: Prime Minister
- Term length: 4 years
- Formation: 2 August 2004
- First holder: Henriette Kjær
- Final holder: Carina Christensen
- Abolished: 23 November 2007

Minister for Family and Consumer Affairs of Denmark (Danish: Minister for Familie- og Forbrugeranliggender) was a political office in the Danish government created in August 2004 and worked primarily for families and with consumption-related topics. The main purpose of the ministry was to protect the interests of families in a wider sense. The minister was the head of the new Ministry for Family and Consumer Affairs.

The ministry mainly covered consumers' protection, children, family and youth related areas, custody of children, adoption, marriage, divorce and food safety (including nutrition and pest control). The ministry was organized into a department of 60 employees, 3 sub-departments and a research institution. The ministry employed a total of 3,000 people.

December 13, 2006 Danish People's Party announced, that they no longer had faith in Lars Barfoed. Barfoed subsequently announced his resignation on national TV, effective the following day. He was succeeded by Carina Christensen, appointed on December 15, 2006.

It has been abolished after the 2007 Folketing elections, and its responsibilities have since been assigned to the new Danish Ministry of Social Welfare.

== List of ministers ==
| No. | Portrait | Name (born-died) | Term of office | | | Political party | Government | Ref. |
| No. | Portrait | Name (born-died) | Took office | Left office | Time in office | Political party | Government | Ref. |
Minister for Family Affairs (Minister for familiens anliggender)
| 1 | | Camma Larsen-Ledet (1915–1991) | 28 November 1966 | 2 February 1968 | 1 year, 66 days | Social Democrats | Krag II | |
Minister for Family and Consumer Affairs (Minister for familie- og forbrugeranliggender)
| 2 | | Henriette Kjær (born 1966) | 2 August 2004 | 18 February 2005 | 200 days | Conservatives | A. F. Rasmussen I | |
| 3 | | Lars Barfoed (born 1957) | 18 February 2005 | 14 December 2006 | 1 year, 299 days | Conservatives | A. F. Rasmussen II | |
| 4 | | Carina Christensen (born 1972) | 15 December 2006 | 23 November 2007 | 344 days | Conservatives | A. F. Rasmussen II | |
