= Bendt Bendtsen =

Danish politician

Bendt Bendtsen MEP
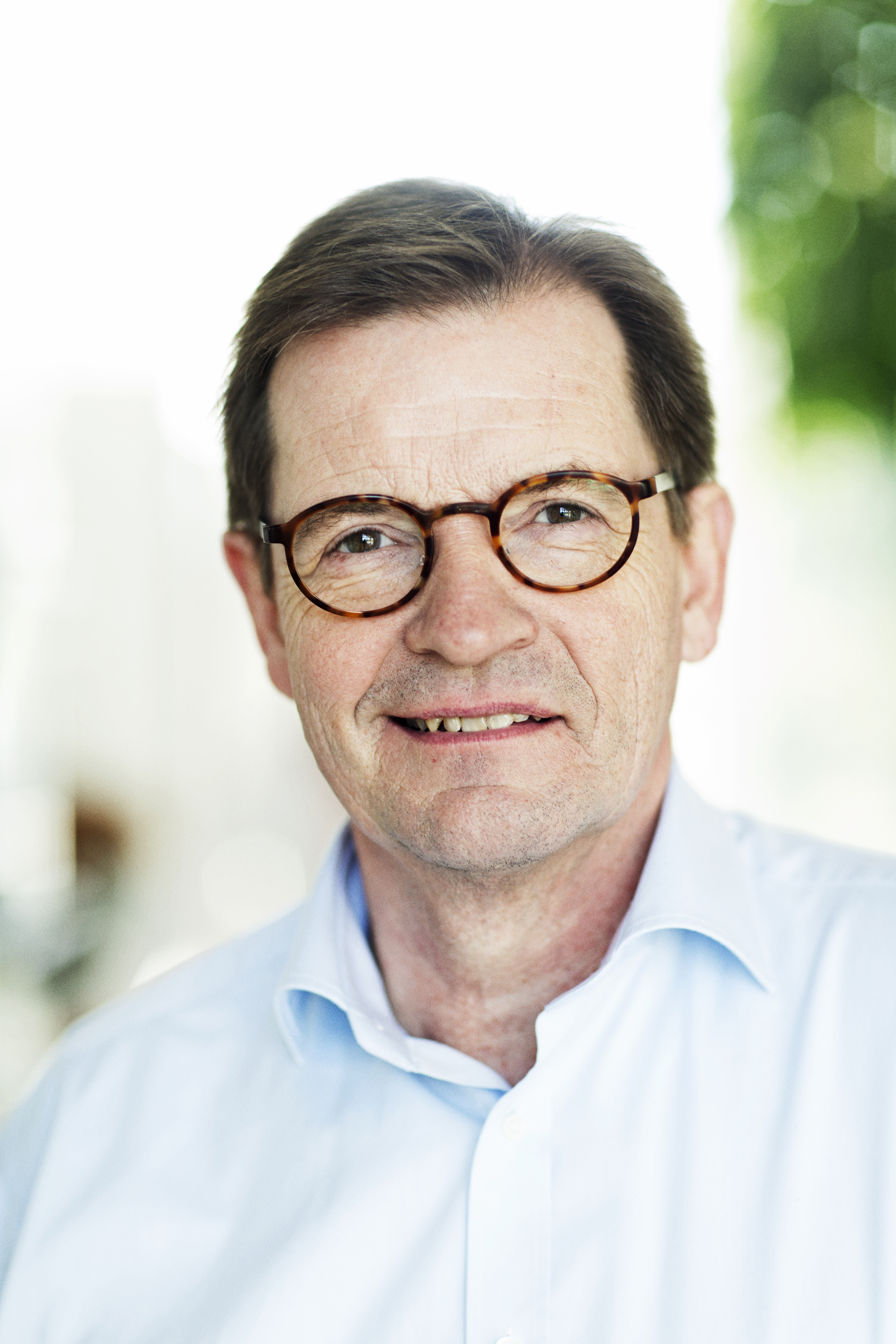
- Bendtsen in 2014

Member of the European Parliament
- In office 1 July 2009 – 2019
- Constituency: Denmark

Deputy Prime Minister of Denmark and Minister of Business Affairs
- In office 27 November 2001 – 9 September 2008
- Prime Minister: Anders Fogh Rasmussen
- Succeeded by: Lene Espersen

Member of the Folketing
- In office 24 April 1994 – 1 July 2009
- Constituency: Funen County

Personal details
- Born: 25 March 1954 (age 72) Odense, Denmark
- Party: Danish; Conservative People's Party; EU; European People's Party
- Spouse: Kirsten Bendtsen
- Children: 3
- Education: University of Copenhagen
- Website: www.bendt.dk

Bendt Bendtsen (born 25 March 1954) is a Danish politician who served as Member of the European Parliament (MEP) from 2009 until 2019. He was the leader of the Conservative People's Party from 1999 to 2008, and served as Minister of Economic and Business Affairs. As a MEP, he was part of the European People's Party.

Before being elected, Bendtsen worked as a member of Odense's police force; he became a member of the Odense City Council in 1989, and he was Vice-Chairman of the Odense Criminal Police Association from 1989 to 1992.

== Political career ==
=== Member of the Folketing ===
Bendtsen was a temporary member of the Folketing for the Conservative Party, representing Funen County constituency, from 5 April to 24 April 1994, and he was subsequently elected as a Conservative member of the Folketing from Funen County constituency in the parliamentary election held on 21 September 1994. In the November 2007 parliamentary election he was elected from the Funen greater constituency.

=== Minister of Economy ===
Following the November 2001 parliamentary election, Bendt Bendtsen became Minister for Economic and Business Affairs and Minister for Nordic Cooperation on 27 November 2001 in the Cabinet of Anders Fogh Rasmussen I. He left the post of Minister for Nordic Cooperation on 18 June 2002, but remained Minister for Economic and Business Affairs. He retained the latter post in the Cabinet of Anders Fogh Rasmussen II (2005) and III (2007). On 9 September 2008, he tendered his resignation as leader of the party, which then elected Lene Espersen as leader, also resigning from his post as minister.

=== European Parliament ===
Bendt Bendtsen was elected Member of the European Parliament in the 2009 elections. Throughout his time in parliament, he served as member of the Committee on Industry, Research and Energy (ITRE). He was also a substitute member in the Committee on Budgets (BUDG) and Special Committee on the Financial, Economic and Social Crisis. In parliament, he was part of the European People's Party, which is the biggest political group in the parliament.

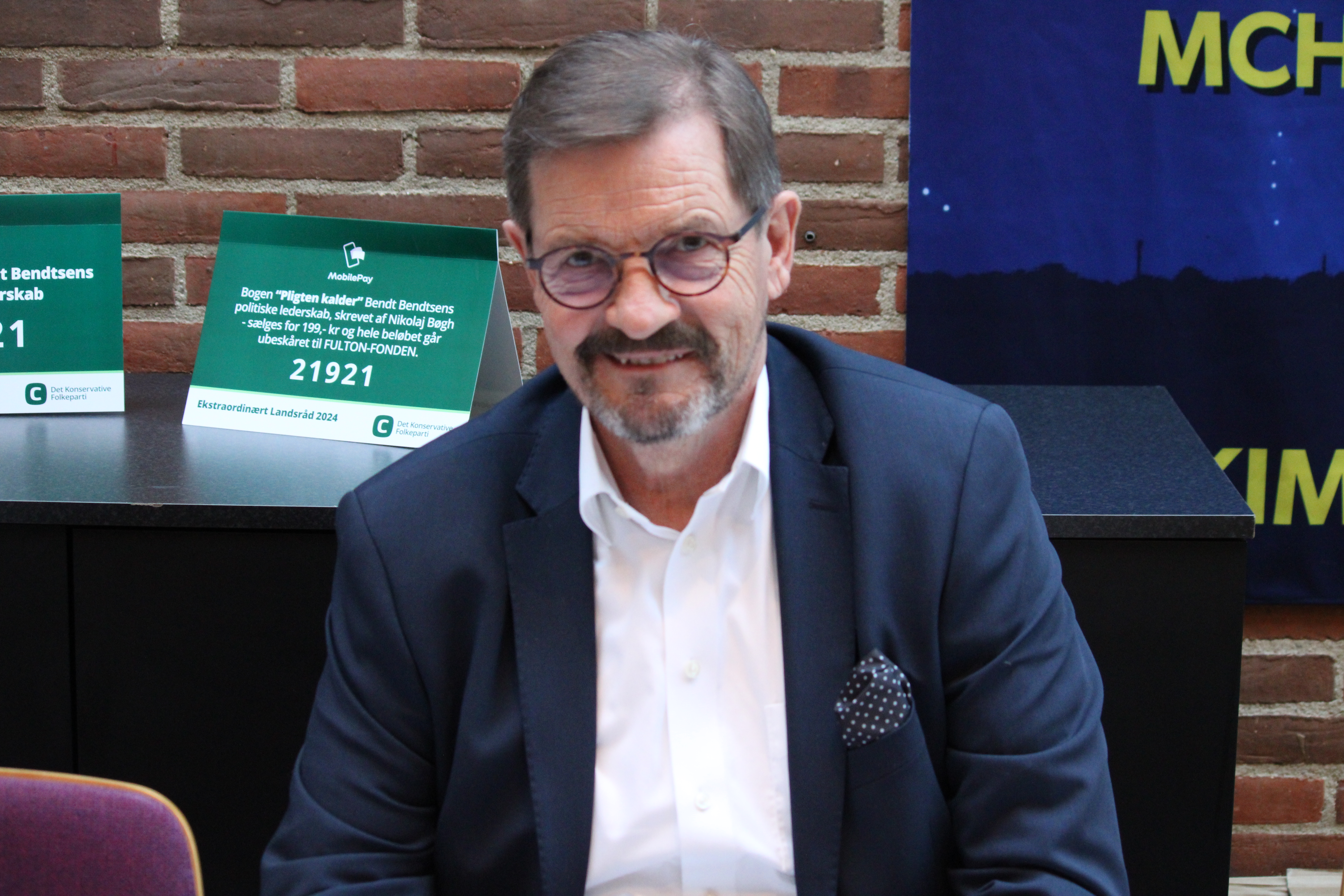
Bendtsen at his party's extraordinary general meeting in Herning, 21 April 2024

In addition to his committee assignments, Bendtsen was a member of the Parliament's delegation for relations with China from 2014 until 2019. In May 2012, he founded together with the Austrian MEP Paul Rübig and the Bulgarian MEP Nadezhda Neynsky a new organization called SME Europe, the pro-business organization within the European People's Party, which aims at improving the situation of small and medium-sized enterprises all across Europe. He held the position of First Vice-President. He was also a supporter of the MEP Heart Group, a group of parliamentarians who have an interest in promoting measures that help reduce the burden of cardiovascular diseases (CVD).

== Other activities ==
- European Bank for Reconstruction and Development (EBRD), Ex-Officio Member of the Board of Governors (2001-2008)
- European Investment Bank (EIB), Ex-Officio Member of the Board of Governors (2001-2008)

== Sources ==
- History of the Conservative People's Party - From their official webpage.

Political offices
Preceded by Office created	Deputy Prime Minister; 27 November 2001 – 9 September 2008	Succeeded by Lene Espersen
Preceded by Ole Stavad and Marianne Jelved	Minister of Economic and Business affairs 27 November 2001 – 9 September 2008	Succeeded by Lene Espersen
Preceded by Marianne Jelved	Minister of Nordic Cooperation; 27 November 2001 – 18 June 2002	Succeeded by Flemming Hansen
Party political offices
Preceded by Pia Christmas-Møller	Leader of the Conservative People's Party; 5 August 1999 – 9 September 2008	Succeeded by Lene Espersen
