= Brian Mikkelsen =

Danish politician (born 1966)

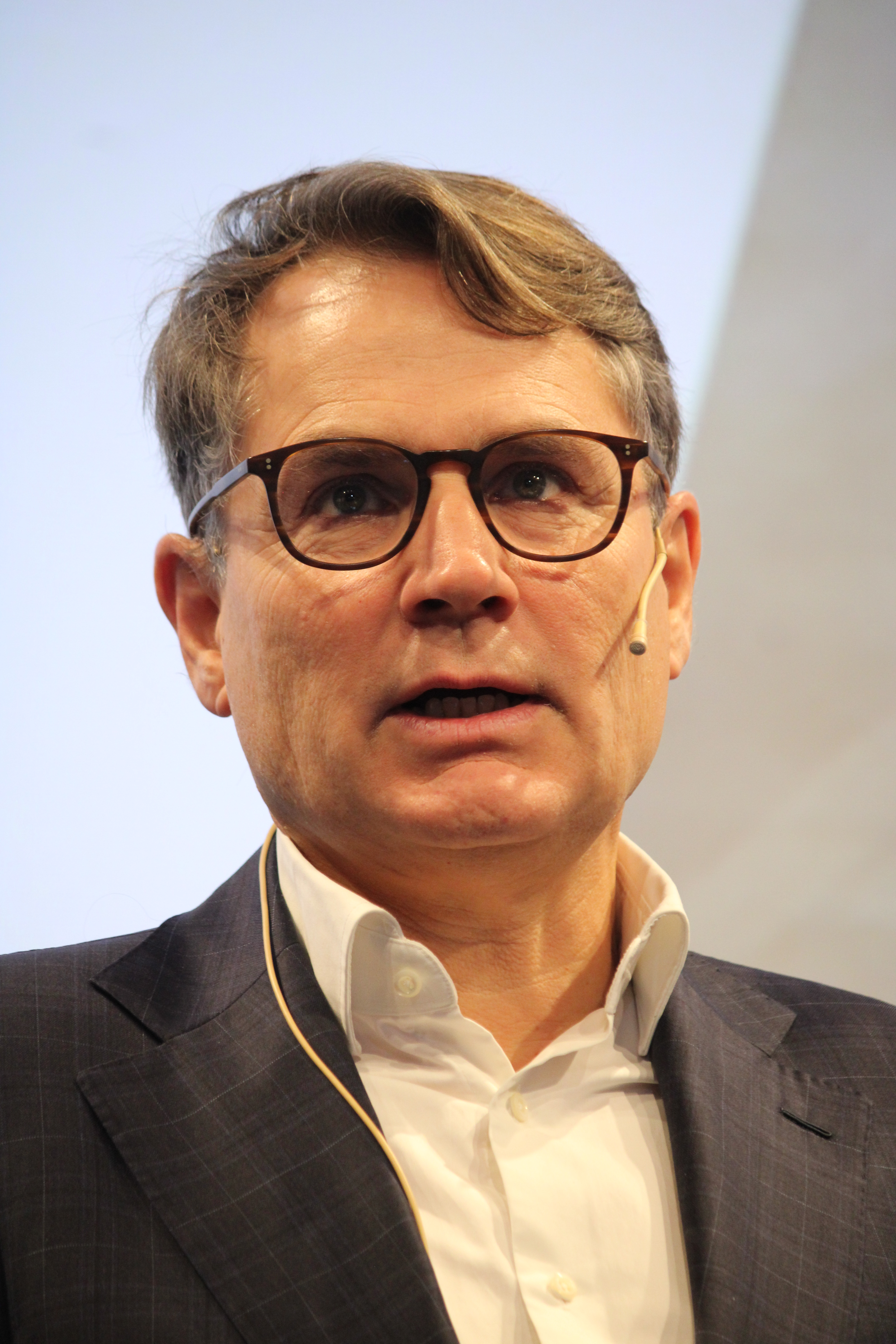
- Mikkelsen in 2025

CEO of the Danish Chamber of Commerce
- Incumbent
- Assumed office 21 June 2018

Minister of Industry, Business and Financial Affairs
- In office 28 November 2016 – 20 June 2018
- Prime Minister: Lars Løkke Rasmussen
- Preceded by: Troels Lund Poulsen
- Succeeded by: Rasmus Jarlov

Minister of Economic and Business Affairs
- In office 23 February 2010 – 3 October 2011
- Prime Minister: Lars Løkke Rasmussen
- Preceded by: Lene Espersen
- Succeeded by: Ole Sohn

Minister of Justice
- In office 10 September 2008 – 23 February 2010
- Prime Minister: Anders Fogh Rasmussen; Lars Løkke Rasmussen
- Preceded by: Lene Espersen
- Succeeded by: Lars Barfoed

Minister of Culture
- In office 27 November 2001 – 10 September 2008
- Prime Minister: Anders Fogh Rasmussen
- Preceded by: Elsebeth Gerner Nielsen
- Succeeded by: Carina Christensen

Vice President of World Anti-Doping Agency
- In office 2004–2006

Member of the Folketing
- In office 21 September 1994 – 21 June 2018
- Constituency: West Zealand (1994–2007); Zealand (2007–2018)

Personal details
- Born: 31 January 1966 (age 60) Copenhagen, Denmark
- Party: Conservative People's
- Spouse: Eliane Wexøe Mikkelsen
- Education: University of Copenhagen

Brian Arthur Mikkelsen (born 31 January 1966) is the CEO of the Danish Chamber of Commerce. He is a former Minister and member of the Conservative People's Party, and was a member of the Danish Parliament (Folketinget) from 21 September 1994 to 21 June 2018.

Mikkelsen was born in Copenhagen as the son of systems consultant Arne Mikkelsen and receptionist Winnie Mikkelsen.

== Political career ==
Mikkelsen was the Danish Culture Minister from November 2001 to September 2008, Justice Minister from September 2008 to February 2010, Minister of Economic and Business Affairs from February 2010 to October 2011, and Minister of Industry, Business and Financial Affairs from 28 November 2016 to 20 June 2018.

== Other activities ==
Mikkelsen has since 2001 been a member of the executive committee of the World Anti-Doping Agency, and he was its vice-president from 2004 to 2006.

In his capacity as minister, he also held the following positions:

- European Bank for Reconstruction and Development (EBRD), Ex-Officio Member of the Board of Governors
- European Investment Bank (EIB), Ex-Officio Member of the Board of Governors
- Nordic Investment Bank (NIB), Ex-Officio Member of the Board of Governors

Political offices
Preceded by Elsebeth Gerner Nielsen	Minister of Culture; 27 November 2001 – 10 September 2008	Succeeded by Carina Christensen
Preceded by Lene Espersen	Minister of Justice; 10 September 2008 – 23 February 2010	Succeeded by Lars Barfoed
Preceded by Lene Espersen	Minister of Economic and Business Affairs; 23 February 2010 – 3 October 2011	Succeeded by Ole Sohn
Preceded by Troels Lund Poulsen	Minister of Industry, Business and Financial Affairs; 28 November 2016 – 20 June 2018	Succeeded by Rasmus Jarlov
