= Lene Espersen =

Danish politician (born 1965)

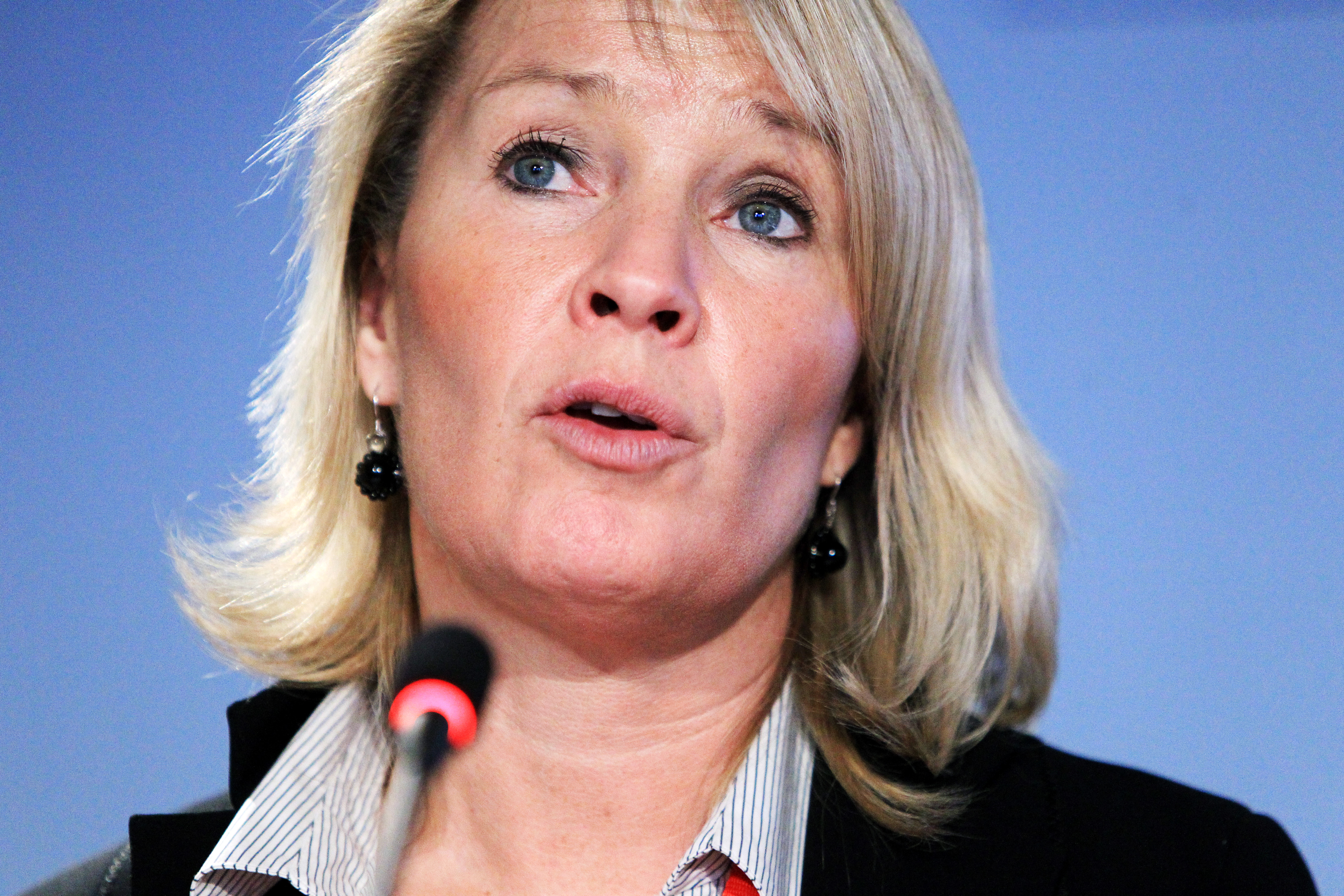
- Espersen in 2010

Deputy Prime Minister of Denmark
- In office 10 September 2008 – 13 January 2011
- Prime Minister: Anders Fogh Rasmussen; Lars Løkke Rasmussen
- Preceded by: Bendt Bendtsen
- Succeeded by: Lars Barfoed

Minister of Foreign Affairs
- In office 23 February 2010 – 3 October 2011
- Prime Minister: Lars Løkke Rasmussen
- Preceded by: Per Stig Møller
- Succeeded by: Villy Søvndal

Minister of Economic and Business Affairs
- In office 10 September 2008 – 23 February 2010
- Prime Minister: Anders Fogh Rasmussen; Lars Løkke Rasmussen
- Preceded by: Bendt Bendtsen
- Succeeded by: Brian Mikkelsen

Leader of the Conservative People's Party
- In office 9 September 2008 – 13 January 2011
- Preceded by: Bendt Bendtsen
- Succeeded by: Lars Barfoed

Minister of Justice
- In office 27 November 2001 – 10 September 2008
- Prime Minister: Anders Fogh Rasmussen
- Preceded by: Frank Jensen
- Succeeded by: Brian Mikkelsen

Personal details
- Born: 26 September 1965 (age 61) Hirtshals, Denmark
- Party: Conservative People's Party
- Spouse: Danny Feltmann
- Children: 2
- Education: University of Aarhus

Lene Espersen (born 26 September 1965) is a Danish former politician, a former leader of Conservative People's Party and a former Minister of Justice. She is the current CEO at the Danish Association of Architectural Firms. From 1 July 2016 to June 30, 2020, she served as chairman of the board of Aalborg University.

== Early life ==
Born to a fisherman father and a book-keeper mother, she grew up with her younger sister in Hirtshals in the north of Jutland, on Denmark’s mainland. She attended Lester B. Pearson United World College of the Pacific in Canada.

== Political career ==
Espersen was the first person in her family to join a political party. A member of the Folketinget from 1994, she served as Minister of Justice from 27 November 2001 to 10 September 2008 and as Minister of Economic and Business Affairs from 10 September 2008 to 23 February 2010.

Espersen served as Minister of Foreign Affairs from 23 February 2010 to 3 October 2011, making her Denmark’s first female foreign minister and the only woman in such a post in the EU at the time.

Espersen was the leader of the Conservative People's Party and was Deputy Prime Minister from 9 September 2008 to 13 January 2011.

On 13 January 2011, she announced at a press conference at 19.00 pm, briefly after her arrival in Denmark, that she would not continue as leader of the Conservative People's Party. The announcement came after months of increasing pressure, where various issues regarding her work ethics, had gained national attention, and decreasing support in opinion polls for the party. During her tenure as political leader, support for the Conservative People's Party was reduced from around 10% to below 5%. On 14 January, Lars Barfoed succeeded Lene Espersen as political leader of the Conservative People's Party.

== Other activities ==
- Trilateral Commission, Member of the European Group
- Baltic Development Forum, Chair (since 2014)
- European Bank for Reconstruction and Development (EBRD), Ex-Officio Member of the Board of Governors (2008-2010)

== Political positions ==
When the Danish newspaper Jyllands-Posten published controversial cartoons of Muhammad in 2005, Espersen defended its right to publish and labelled Muslim extremism as more dangerous than climate change. In 2012, in her capacity as foreign minister, she met with 17 ambassadors from Muslim countries as part of efforts to prevent any new cartoon crisis and to foster understanding.

== Controversy ==
In 2006, Espersen was stripped of her parliamentary immunity after crashing into a woman on a scooter. She was subsequently banned from driving and fined €150.

== Notes ==
Political offices
Preceded by Frank Jensen	Minister of Justice; 2001–2008	Succeeded by Brian Mikkelsen
Preceded by Bendt Bendtsen	Deputy Prime Minister of Denmark; 2008–2011	Title abolished
Preceded by Bendt Bendtsen	Minister of Economic and Business Affairs; 2008–2010	Succeeded by Brian Mikkelsen
Preceded by Per Stig Møller	Minister of Foreign Affairs; 2010–2011	Succeeded by Villy Søvndal
Party political offices
Preceded by Bendt Bendtsen	Leader of the Conservative People's Party; 2008–2011	Succeeded by Lars Barfoed
