= Minister of Energy (Denmark) =

- Energiminister
- State coat of arms of the Kingdom of Denmark

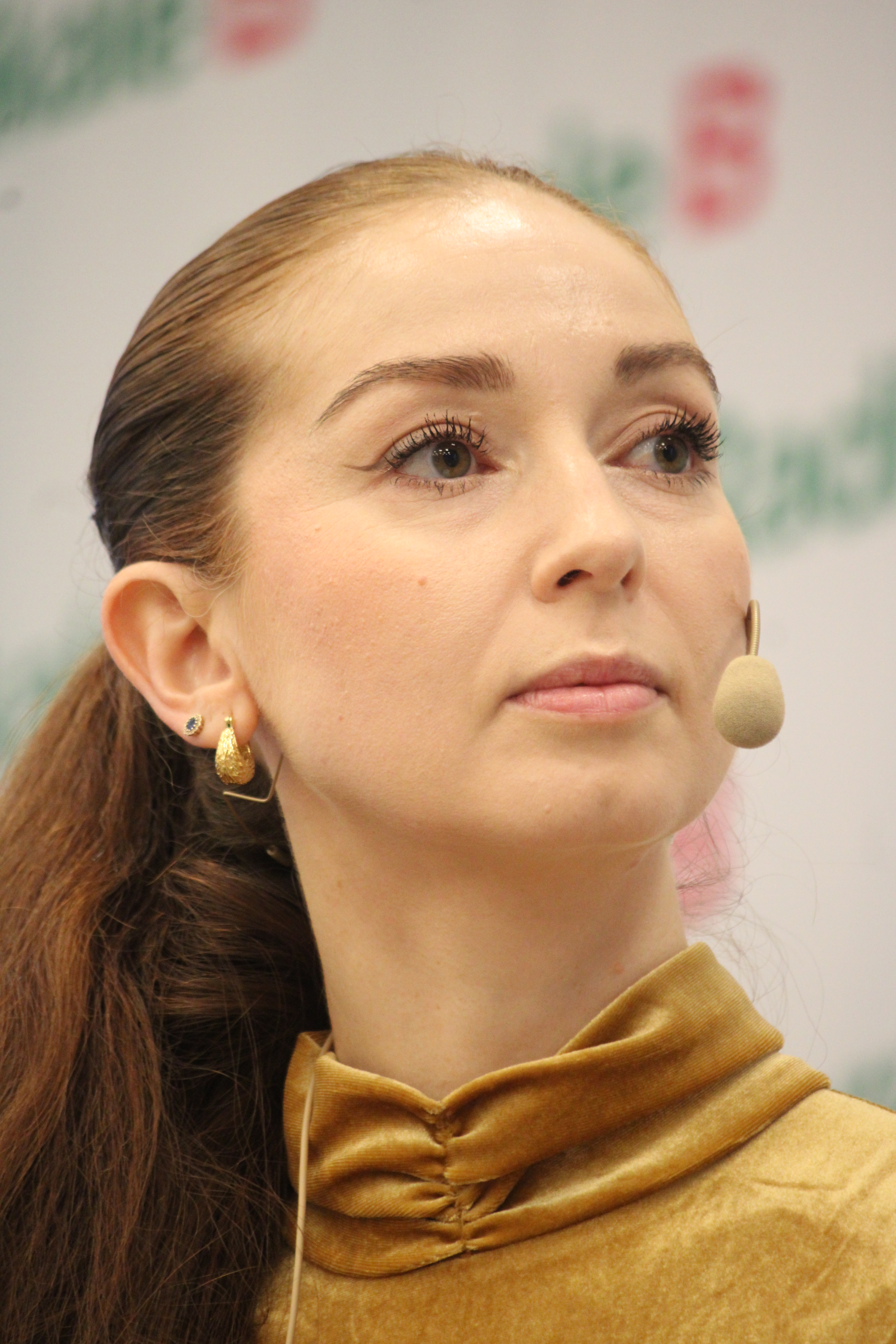
- Incumbent; Samira Nawa since 3 June 2026
- Ministry of Climate, Energy and Utilities
- Type: Minister
- Member of: Cabinet; State Council
- Reports to: the Prime minister
- Seat: Slotsholmen
- Appointer: The Monarch (on the advice of the Prime Minister)
- Formation: 26 October 1979; 46 years ago
- First holder: Poul Nielson
- Succession: depending on the order in the State Council
- Deputy: Permanent Secretary
- Salary: 1.624.503,02 DKK (€217,931), in 2026

The Danish Minister of the Energy (Danish: Energiminister), is a minister in the government of Denmark, with overall responsibility for strategy and policy across the Ministry of Climate, Energy and Utilities. The ministry and the ministerial position were created in 1979.

== List of ministers ==
No.	Portrait	Name (born-died)	Term of office			Political party	Government	Ref.
No.	Portrait	Name (born-died)	Took office	Left office	Time in office	Political party	Government	Ref.
Minister of Energy (Energiminister)
1		Poul Nielson (born 1943)	26 October 1979	10 September 1982	2 years, 319 days	Social Democrats	Jørgensen IV–V	
2		Knud Enggaard (1929–2024)	10 September 1982	12 March 1986	3 years, 183 days	Venstre	Schlüter I	
3		Svend Erik Hovmand (born 1945)	12 March 1986	3 June 1988	2 years, 83 days	Venstre	Schlüter II	
4		Jens Bilgrav-Nielsen (born 1936)	3 June 1988	18 December 1990	2 years, 198 days	Social Liberal Party	Schlüter III	
5		Anne Birgitte Lundholt (born 1952)	18 December 1990	25 January 1993	2 years, 38 days	Conservative People's Party	Schlüter IV	
6		Jann Sjursen (born 1960)	25 January 1993	27 September 1994	1 year, 245 days	Christian Democrats	P. N. Rasmussen I	
Minister of the Environment and Energy (Miljø- og energiminister)
7		Svend Auken (1943–2009)	25 January 1993	27 November 2001	8 years, 306 days	Social Democrats	P. N. Rasmussen I–II–III–IV	
Minister of Transport and Energy (Transport- og energiminister)
8		Flemming Hansen (1939–2021)	27 November 2001	12 September 2007	5 years, 289 days	Conservative People's Party	A. F. Rasmussen I–II	
9		Jakob Axel Nielsen (born 1967)	12 September 2007	23 November 2007	72 days	Conservative People's Party	A. F. Rasmussen II	
Minister of Climate and Energy (Klima- og Energiminister)
10		Connie Hedegaard (born 1960)	23 November 2007	24 November 2009	2 years, 1 day	Conservative People's Party	A. F. Rasmussen III; L. L. Rasmussen I	
11		Lykke Friis (born 1969)	24 November 2009	3 October 2011	1 year, 313 days	Venstre	L. L. Rasmussen I	
Minister of Climate, Energy and Construction (Klima-, Energi- og Bygningsminister)
12		Martin Lidegaard (born 1966)	3 October 2011	3 February 2014	2 years, 123 days	Social Liberal Party	Thorning-Schmidt I	
13		Rasmus Helveg Petersen (born 1968)	3 February 2014	28 June 2015	1 year, 145 days	Social Liberal Party	Thorning-Schmidt II	
Minister of Energy, Utilities and Climate (Energi-, forsynings- og klimaminister)
14		Lars Christian Lilleholt (born 1965)	28 June 2015	27 June 2019	3 years, 364 days	Venstre	L. L. Rasmussen II–III	
Minister of Climate, Energy and Utilities (Klima-, energi- og forsyningsminister)
15		Dan Jørgensen (born 1975)	27 June 2019	15 December 2022	3 years, 171 days	Social Democrats	Frederiksen I	
16		Lars Aagaard (born 1967)	15 December 2022	3 June 2026	3 years, 170 days	Moderates	Frederiksen II	
17		Samira Nawa (born 1988)	3 June 2026	Incumbent	96 days	Social Liberal	Frederiksen III	
