= Sector research institutes of Denmark =

The sector research institutes of Denmark (Danish: Sektorforskningsinstitutioner) are state-owned independent research institutes under various Danish Government ministries, whose primary task is to do research in various fields. All institutes classified as sector research institute are subject to the law of Sector research institutes, law #326 of May 5, 2004, previously law #1076 of December 20, 1995.

The Ministry of Science, Technology and Innovation (Danish: Ministeriet for Videnskab, Teknologi og Udvikling) decides which institutes are classified as sector research institutes. The Ministry also consults with Det Strategiske Forskningsråd before abolishing or establishing new institutes.

== List of Sector research institutes ==
=== Ministry of Employment ===
- National Research Centre for the Working Environment (NRCWE)

=== Forsvarsministeriet ===
- Forsvarets Forskningstjeneste (FOFT)

=== Ministry of Health and Prevention ===
- Statens Serum Institut (SSI)
- Statens Institut for Folkesundhed (SIF)

=== Miljøministeriet ===
- Danmarks Miljøundersøgelser (DMU)
- Danmarks og Grønlands Geologiske Undersøgelse (GEUS)
- Forskningscentret for Skov og Landskab (FSL)
- Kort- og Matrikelstyrelsen (KMS)

=== Ministeriet for Fødevarer, Landbrug og Fiskeri ===
- Danmarks Fiskeriundersøgelser (DFU)
- Danmarks JordbrugsForskning (DJF)
- Danmarks Veterinærinstitut (DVI)
- Fødevareøkonomisk Institut (FØI)
- Institut for Fødevaresikkerhed og Ernæring (IFE)
- Statens Skadedyrlaboratorium (SSL)

=== Ministeriet for Videnskab, Teknologi og Udvikling ===
- Analyseinstitut for Forskning (AFSK)
- Center for Sprogteknologi (CST)
- Dansk Rumforskningsinstitut (DRI)
- Forskningscenter Risø
- Institut for Grænseregionsforskning (IGF)

=== Socialministeriet ===
- John F. Kennedy Instituttet (JFK)
- The Danish National Centre for Social Research (SFI)

=== Økonomi- og Erhvervsministeriet ===
- Statens Byggeforskningsinstitut (By & Byg)

=== Trafikministeriet ===
- Danmarks TransportForskning (DTF)
- Danmarks Meteorologiske Institut (DMI)

=== Udenrigsministeriet ===
- Dansk Bilharziose Laboratorium (DBL)
