= Minister for Public Utilities (Denmark) =

Short lived and independent ministerial title

Minister of Public Utilities
- Forsyningsminister (Danish)
- State coat of arms of the Kingdom of Denmark

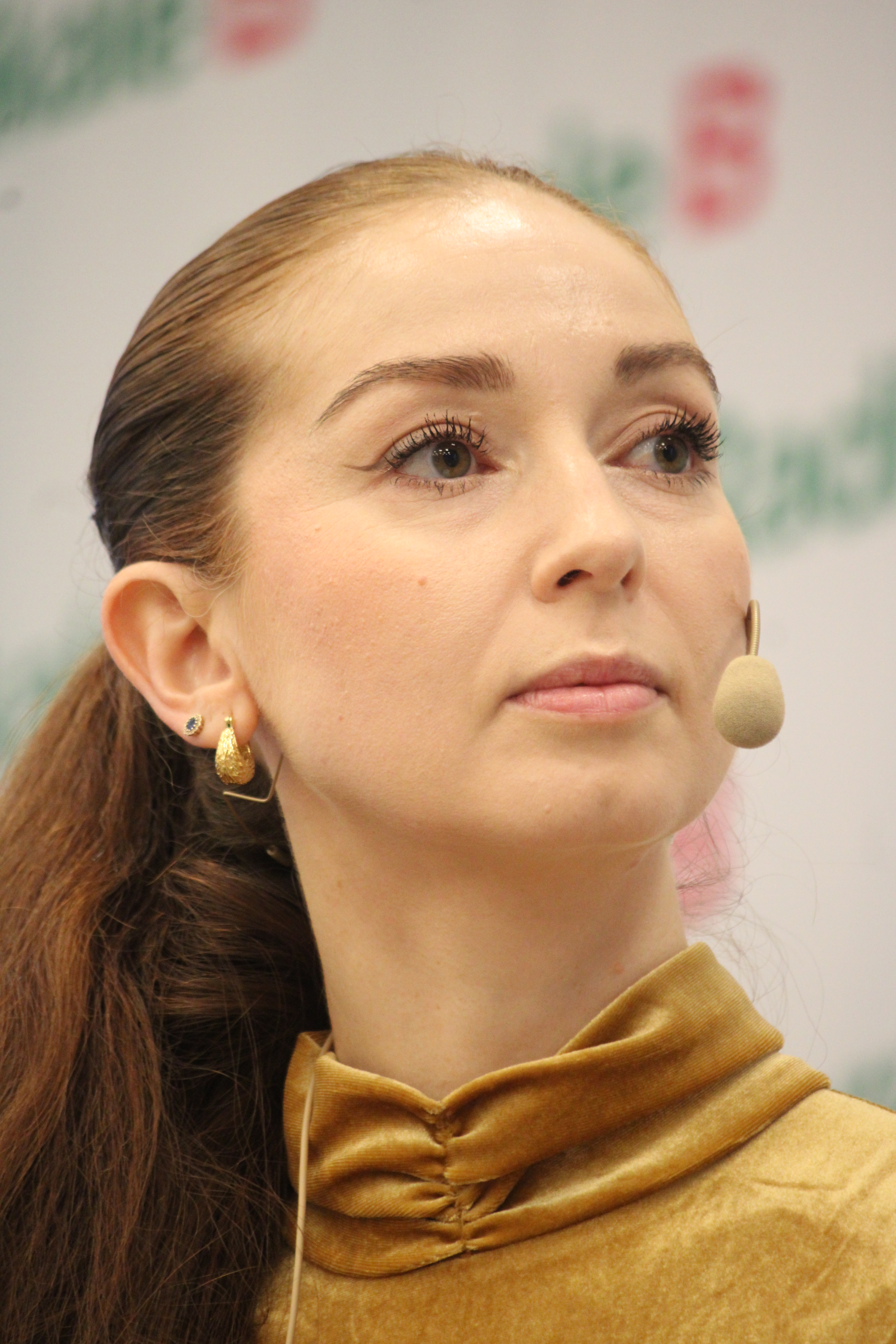
- Incumbent; Samira Nawa since 3 June 2026
- Ministry of Climate, Energy and Utilities
- Type: Minister
- Member of: Cabinet; State Council
- Reports to: the Prime minister
- Seat: Slotsholmen
- Appointer: The Monarch (on the advice of the Prime Minister)
- Formation: 24 April 1947; 79 years ago
- First holder: Axel Kristensen
- Succession: depending on the order in the State Council
- Deputy: Permanent Secretary
- Salary: 1.624.503,02 DKK (€217,931), in 2026
- Website: Official website

The Minister for Public Utilities (Danish: Forsyningsminister) was originally a short lived, independent ministerial title, following a split from the Minister for Commerce, Industry, and Seafaring. It has since been revived by the Second cabinet of Lars Løkke Rasmussen.

== List of ministers ==
No.	Portrait	Name (born-died)	Term of office			Political party	Government	Ref.
No.	Portrait	Name (born-died)	Took office	Left office	Time in office	Political party	Government	Ref.
Minister of Public Utilities (Forsyningsminister)
1		Axel Kristensen (1895–1971)	24 April 1947	13 November 1947	203 days	Venstre	Kristensen	
Minister for Energy, Utilities and Climate (Energi-, forsynings- og klimaminister)
2		Lars Christian Lilleholt (born 1965)	28 June 2015	27 June 2019	3 years, 364 days	Venstre	L. L. Rasmussen II–III	
Minister of Climate, Energy and Utilities (Klima-, energi- og forsyningsminister)
3		Dan Jørgensen (born 1975)	27 June 2019	15 December 2022	3 years, 171 days	Social Democrats	Frederiksen I	
4		Lars Aagaard (born 1967)	15 December 2022	3 June 2026	3 years, 170 days	Moderates	Frederiksen II	
5		Samira Nawa (born 1988)	3 June 2026	Incumbent	96 days	Social Liberal	Frederiksen III	
