= Ministry of the Interior (Denmark) =

Government ministry of Denmark

The Ministry of the Interior (Danish: Indenrigsministerium) is one of the oldest government ministries in Denmark, having been established in 1848, but has frequently been combined with other ministries. Its primary task has been to oversee elections and ensure the state's oversight over the country's regions and municipalities. As of 2024, it is combined with the Ministry of Health to form the Ministry of Interior and Health.

== History ==
The Ministry of the Interior was originally established in 1848 in Adam Wilhelm Moltke's second administration. In the 21st century, it was combined with the Ministry of Health to form the Ministry of Interior and Health from 2001 to 2007, after which its functions were transferred to the Ministry of Welfare (Danish: Velfærdsministerium), which in 2009 changed its name to the Ministry of Social Affairs and the Interior. In 2010 the combined Ministry of Interior and Health was reconstituted. In November 2011, the government of Helle Thorning-Schmidt then separated the Interior Ministry from the Health Ministry and instead combined it with the economic branch of the Ministry of Economic and Business Affairs to form the Ministry of the Economy and the Interior. In June 2015, Lars Løkke Rasmussen's second government again combined its functions with those of the Ministry of Social Affairs to re-establish the Ministry of Social Affairs and the Interior.

By royal resolution on 23 January 2021, the Ministry of the Interior and Housing was established, combining the interior branch from the Ministry of Social Affairs and the Interior with the housing branch from the Ministry of Transport and Housing. In December 2022, the Cabinet of Denmark was rearranged, and the ministry was instead combined with the Ministry of Health to form the Ministry of the Interior and Health (Danish: Indenrigs- og Sundhedsministerie).

== See also ==
- List of Danish government ministries
