= Danish Geodata Agency =

Danish government agency

- Geodatastyrelsen
- Logo of Kort & Matrikelstyrelsen

Agency overview
- Formed: 10 September 1987; 38 years ago
- Jurisdiction: Government of Denmark
- Headquarters: Lindholm Brygge 31, 9400 Nørresundby; 55.7050°N 12.5356°E
- Employees: ~117 civilians
- Annual budget: 340 million DKK (2013)
- Minister responsible: Dan Jørgensen, Minister for Climate, Energy and Utilities
- Agency executive: Pia Dahl Højgaard, Director-general
- Parent department: Ministry of Climate, Energy and Utilities
- Website: eng.gst.dk

The Danish Geodata Agency (GST, Danish: Geodatastyrelsen; previously National Survey and Cadastre of Denmark or KMS, Danish: Kort & Matrikelstyrelsen), is the Danish state agency responsible for surveying, mapping and land registering of all of Denmark, Greenland, the Faroe Islands and all waters associated with these. Geodatastyrelsen is an agency under the Danish Ministry of the Environment.

The overall goal of Geodatastyrelsen is to supply and ensure that everyone in the Danish society has access to reliable and accurate maps and information on all parts of the Danish Realm.

Until 31 December 2004, KMS was a Sector research institute for the Ministry of the Environment in the fields of seismology, geodynamic and geodesy. The seismology part was detached on 1 July 2004 and moved under the responsibility of Geological Survey of Denmark and Greenland (GEUS). On 1 January 2005, the geodesy part was detached and together with Danish Space Research Institute it formed Danish National Space Center.

== History ==
KMS was officially formed on 1 January 1989 by combining Geodætisk Institut, Søkortarkivet and Matrikeldirektoratet, in an effort to strengthen mapping in Denmark. The political decision was conceived in a Royal resolution of 10 September 1987. The definition of its responsibilities is described in law #749 of 7 December 1988. Initially it was located under the Ministry of Housing, but in 2001 it was moved to the Ministry of the Environment.

On 1 January 2013, the agency changed its name to Danish Geodata Agency.

In 2014, the Danish government (through the GST) launched a full 1:1 recreation of the country of Denmark in Minecraft. The game map was based on real, official measurements made public by the Danish Geodata Agency. The reason was to "use the appeal of gaming to draw the public’s attention to geographical data" and an "invitation to teachers and schools to use the data in geography, math, science and history lessons". This, of course, drew attention of cyber vandals who attacked the server by blowing up areas of the map, destroying buildings and planting American flags. It is unclear exactly why.

Chris Hammeken, chief press officer at the Danish Geodata Agency, responded with "Minecraft is about building and rebuilding. [...] Only a minor area was destroyed. [...] It was the players who cleaned up the damage, replacing it with green grass and flowers the following morning." Regardless of the attacks ‒ which have since been fixed ‒ the replica appears to have been a success. On 1 January 2016, the Agency changed into the Agency for Data Supply and Efficiency, and links in English regarding “Denmark in Minecraft” were removed, although individual sections could still be downloaded elsewhere.

== See also ==
- List of national mapping agencies
