= List of Danish government ministries =

List of Danish government ministries, past and present. In Denmark, ministries change often, both when new governments are installed and during specific governments rule. Names are changed, the organizational structure is changed, some ministries are fused, some are discontinued, some are revived, some are newly created. As of 2026, there are 21 ministries in the incumbent Frederiksen III cabinet.

== Current Danish ministries ==
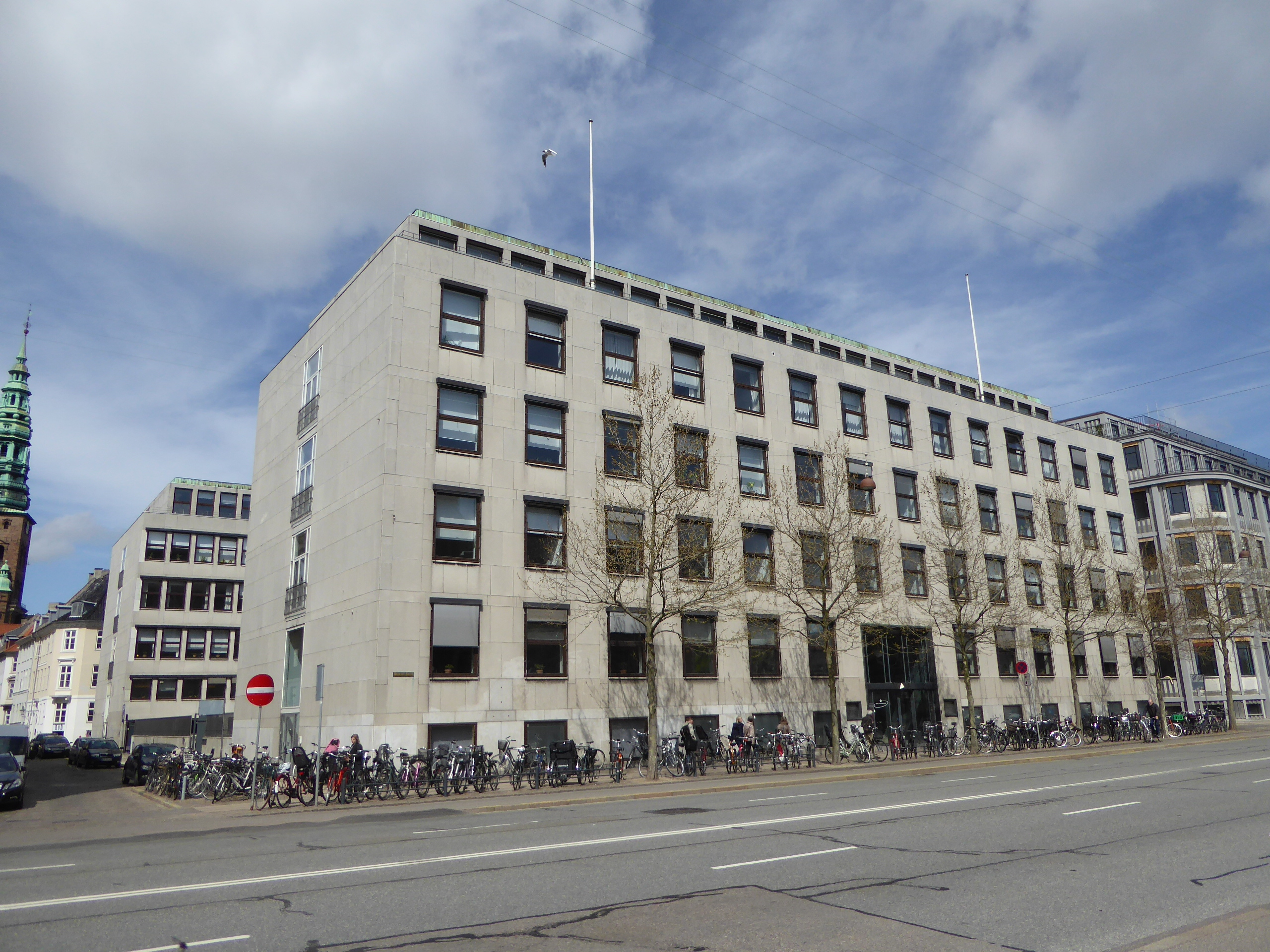
Ministry of Social Affairs

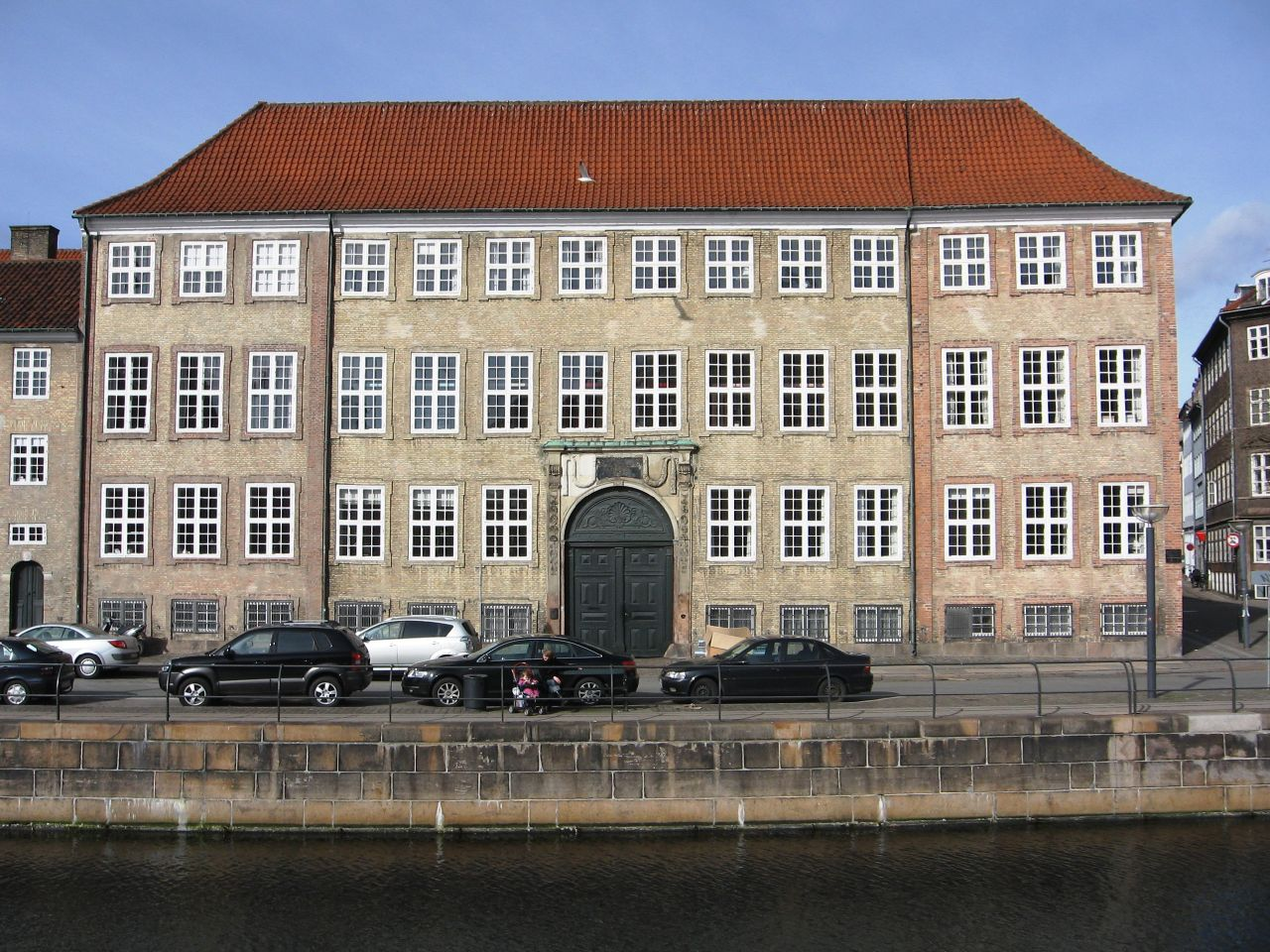
Ministry of Culture

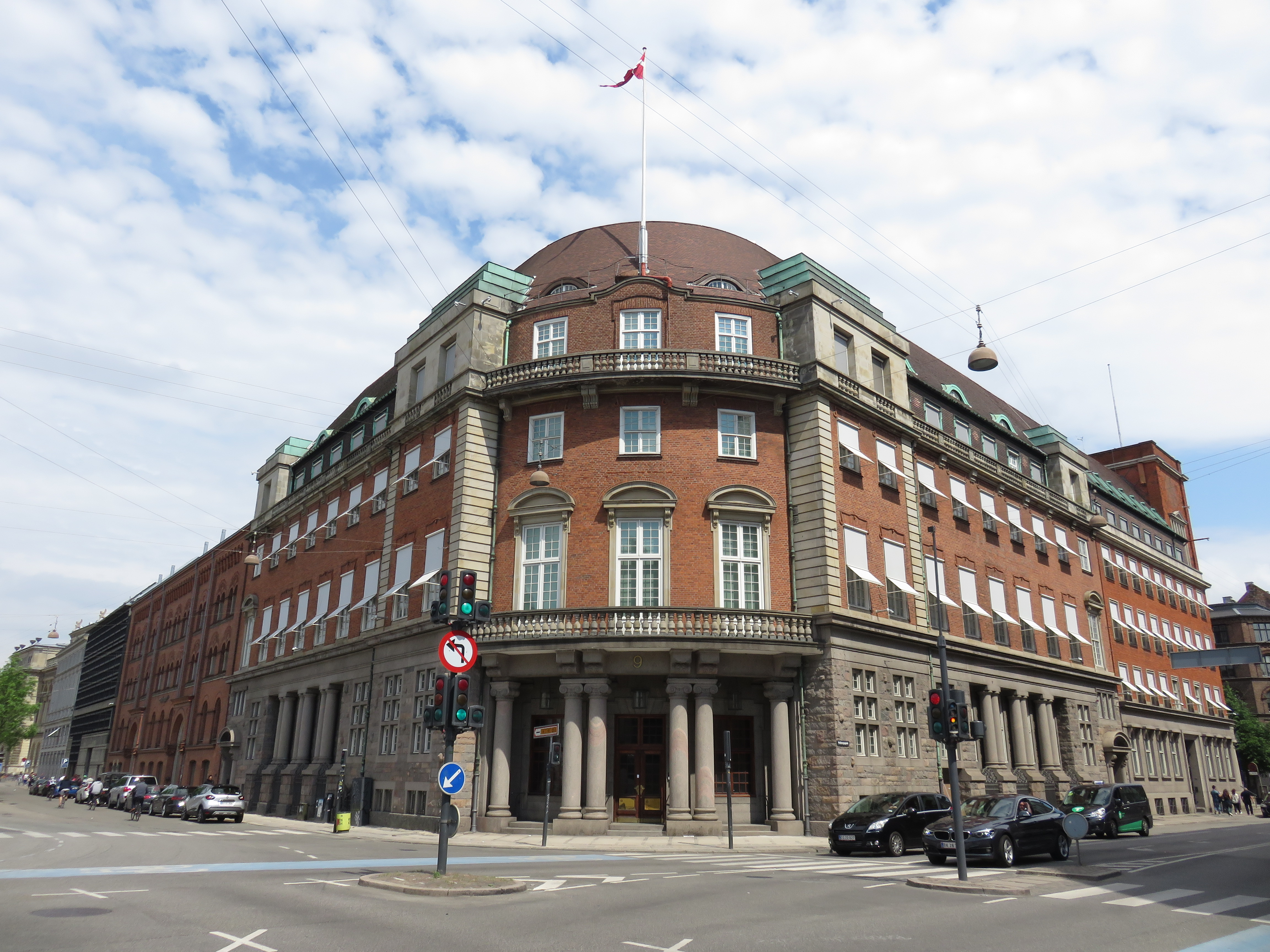
Ministry of Defence

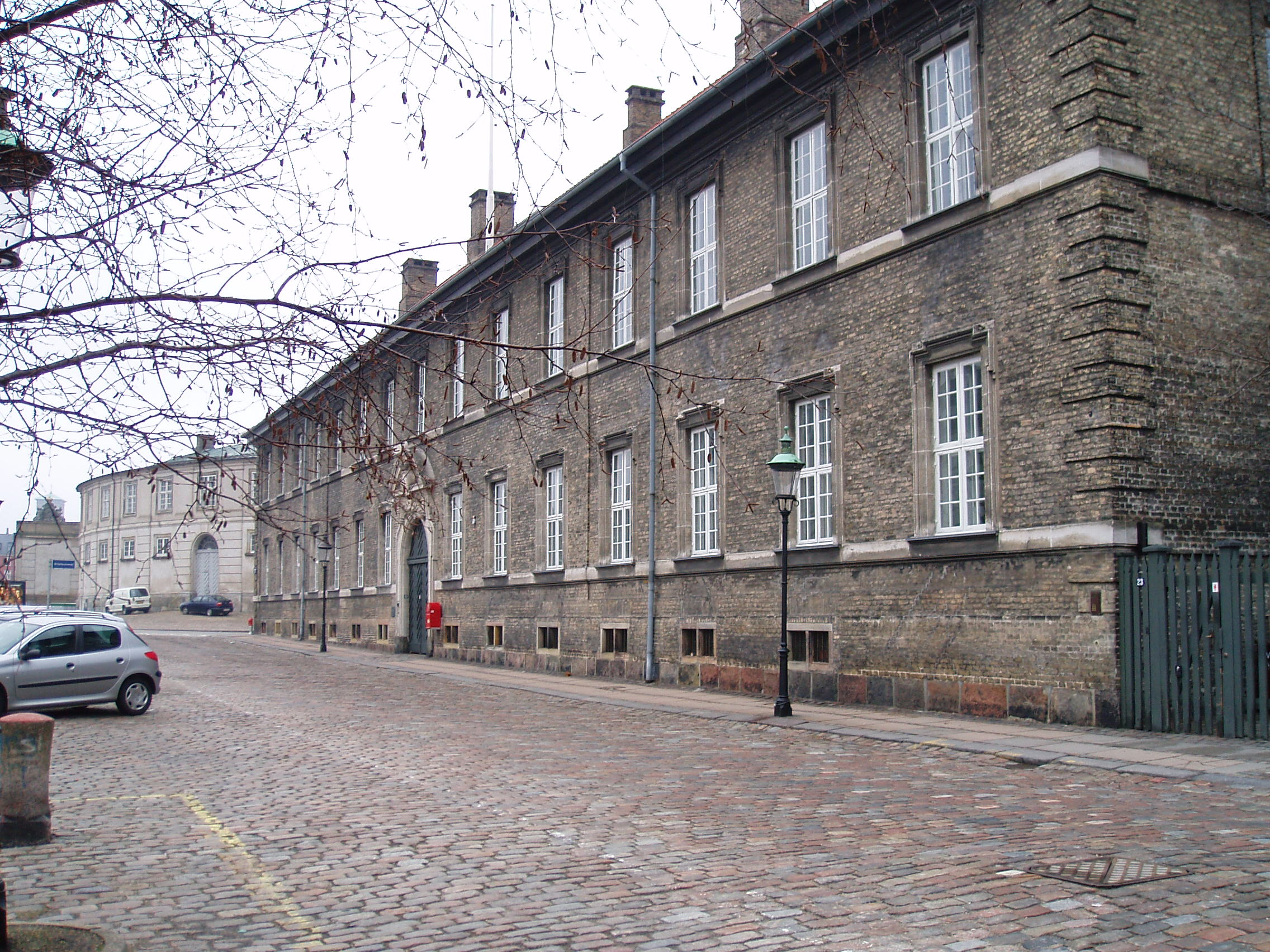
Ministry of Education

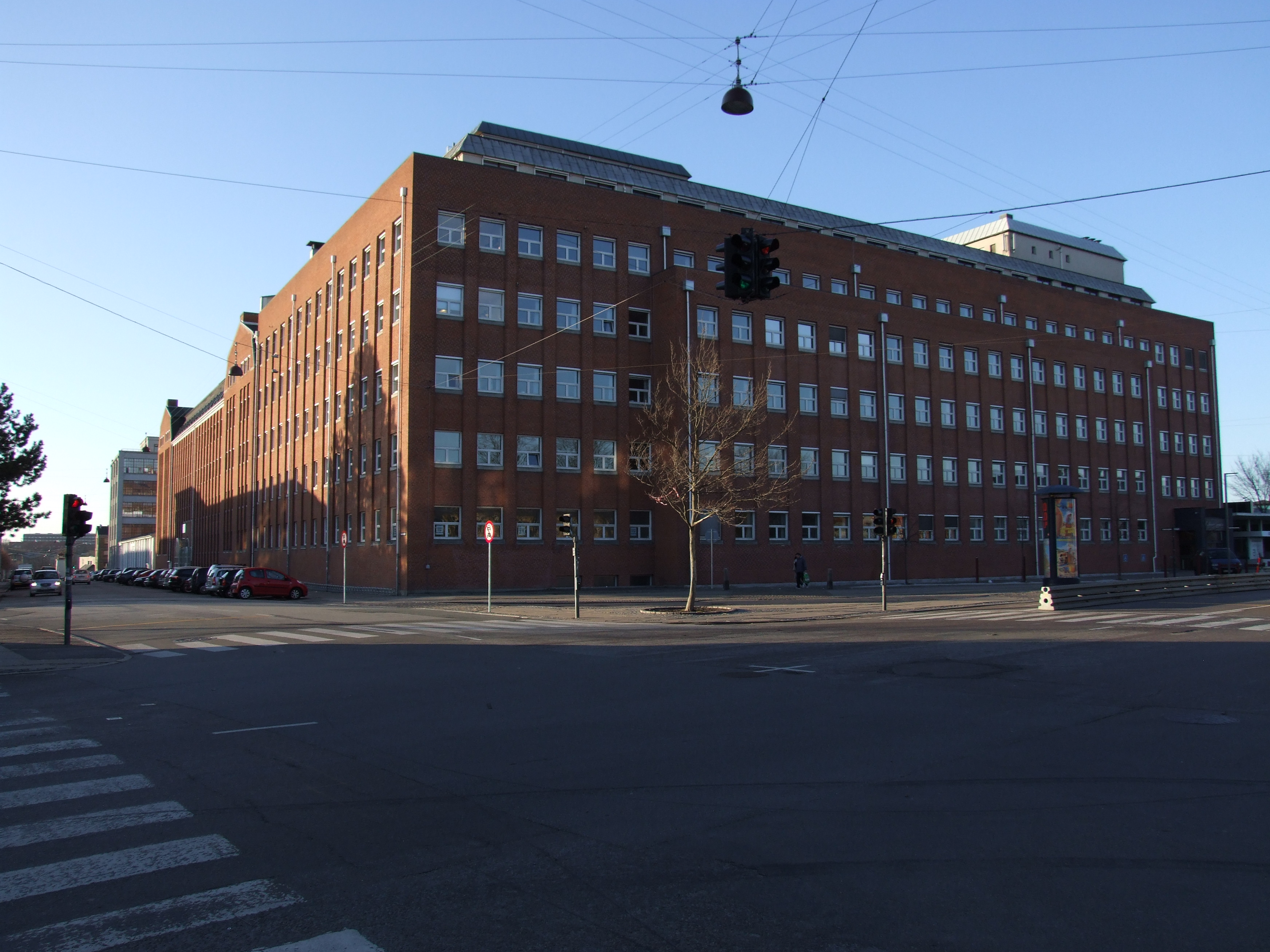
Ministry of the Environment

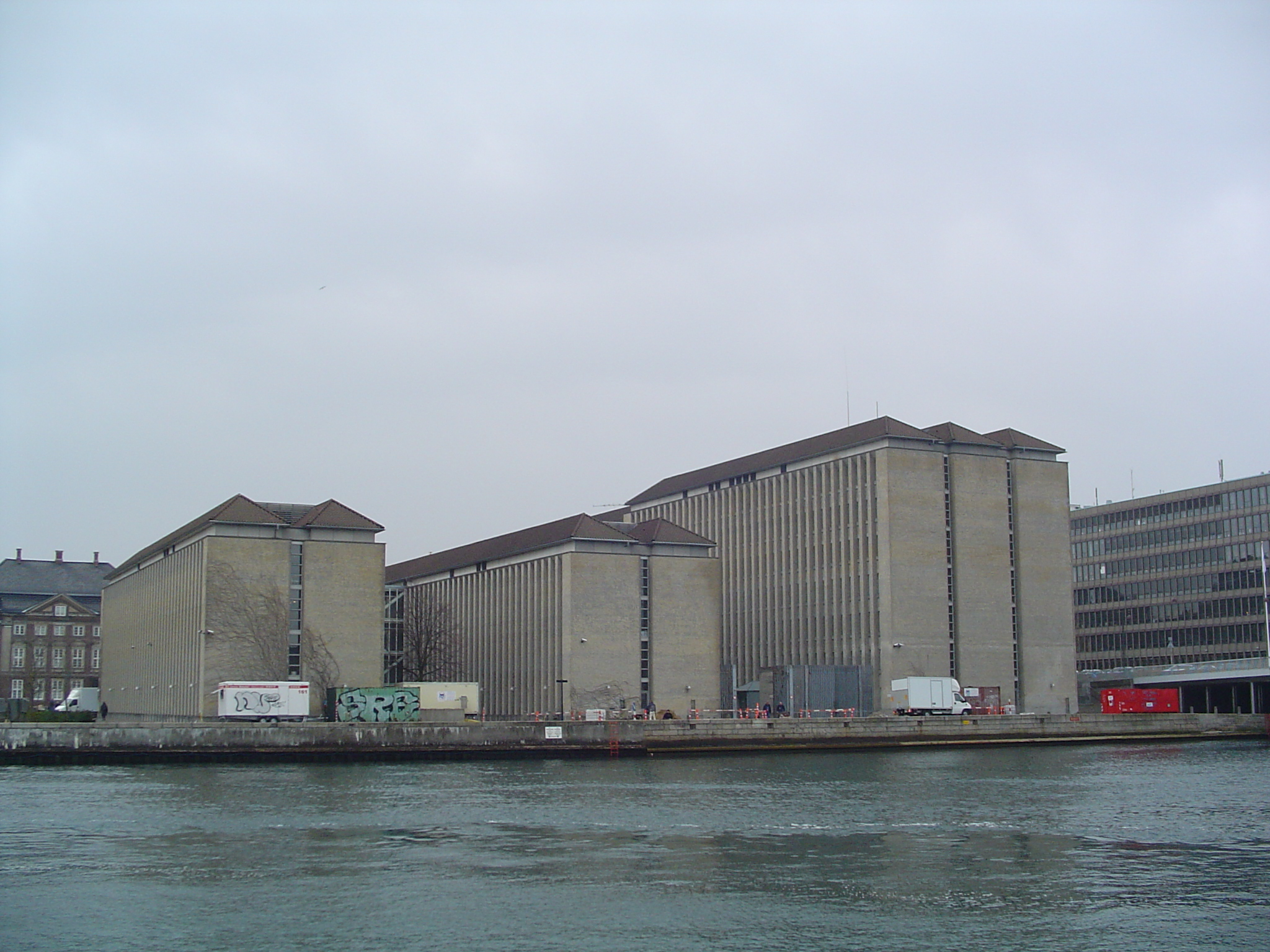
Ministry of Foreign Affairs

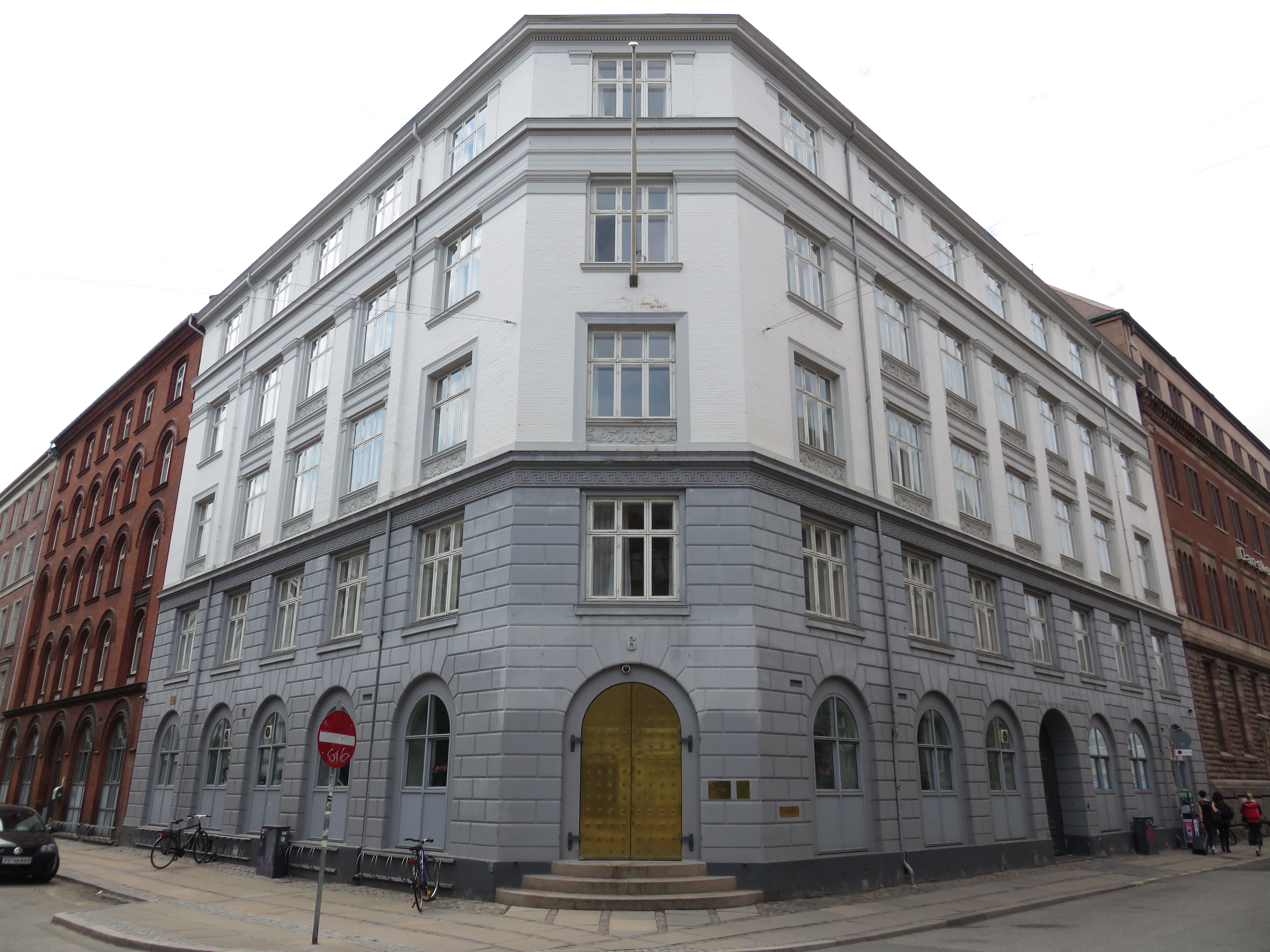
Ministry of Health

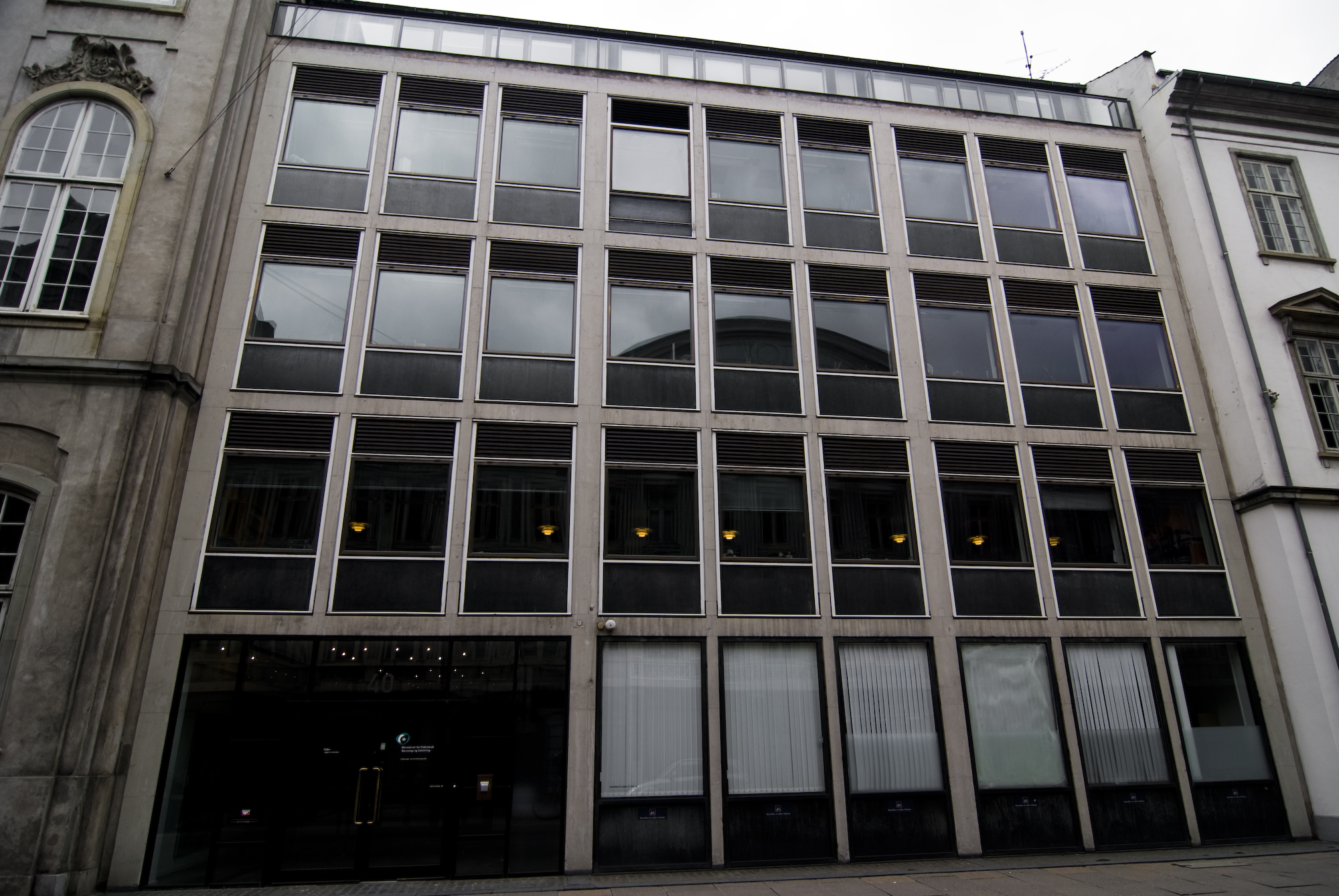
Ministry of Science, Technology and Development

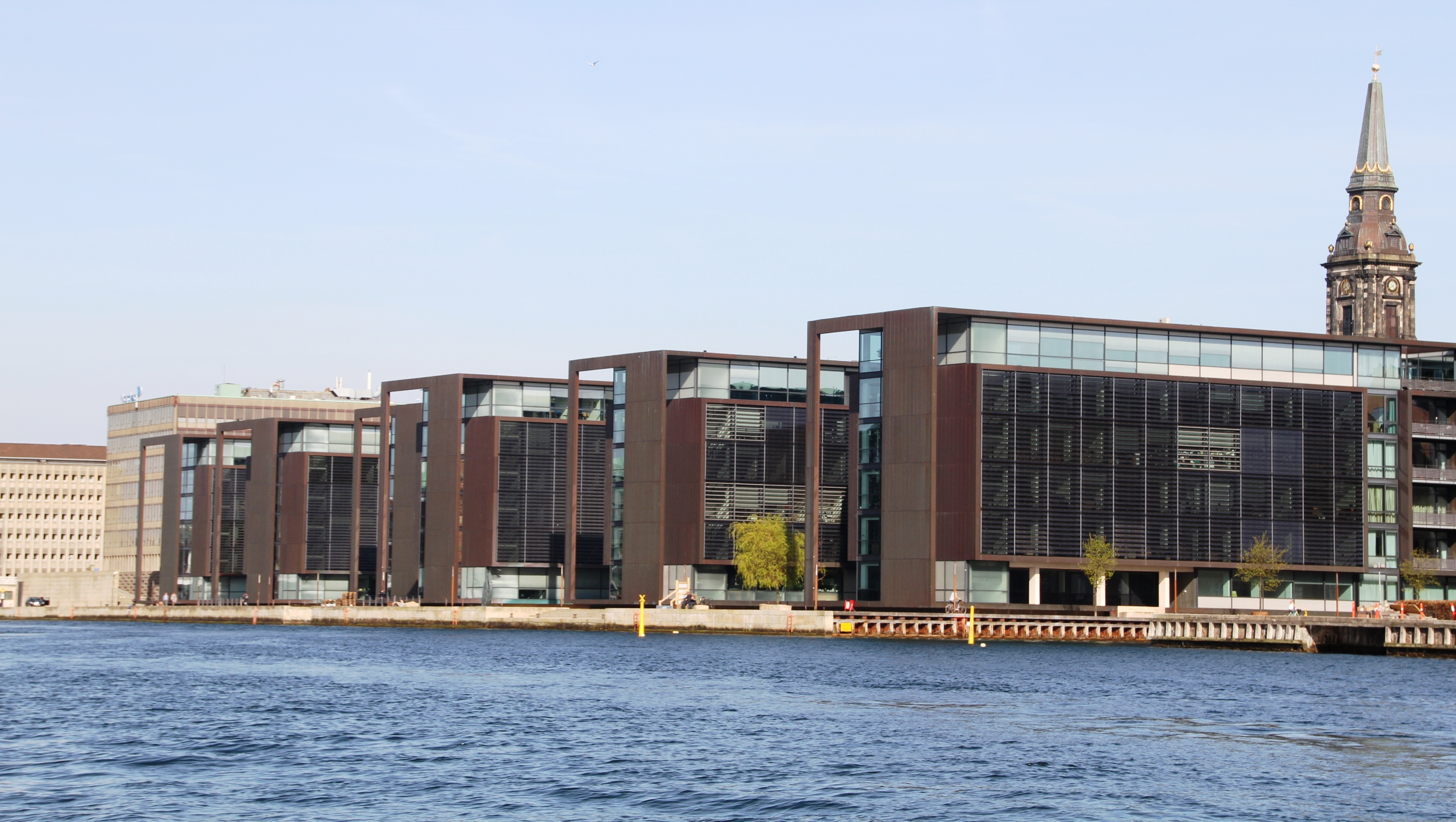
Ministry of Taxation

- Ministry of State (Statsministeriet)
- Ministry for Economic and Interior Affairs (Denmark) (Økonomi- og Indenrigsministeriet)
- Ministry of Foreign Affairs (Udenrigsministeriet)
- Ministry of Business (Erhvervsministeriet)
- Ministry of Finance (Finansministeriet)
- Ministry of Justice (Justitsministeriet)
- Ministry of Science, Higher Education and Digital Affairs (Forsknings-, Uddannelses- og Digitaliseringsministeriet)
- Ministry of Climate, Energy and Utilities (Klima-, Energi- og Forsyningsministeriet)
- Ministry of Urban and Rural Affairs and Transport (By-, Land- og Transportministeriet)
- Ministry for Foreigners and Integration (Udlændinge- og Integrationsministeriet)
- Ministry of Education (Undervisningsministeriet)
- Ministry of Employment and Equality (Beskæftigelses- og Ligestillingsministeriet)
- Ministry of Defence (Forsvarsministeriet)
- Ministry of Taxation and Economic Growth (Skatte- og Vækstministeriet)
- Ministry of Health and Ecclesiastical Affairs (Sundheds- og Kirkeministeriet)
- Ministry of Nature and Animal Welfare (Ministeriet for Natur og Dyrevelfærd)
- Ministry of Culture (Kulturministeriet)
- Ministry of Resilience and Preparedness (Ministeriet for Samfundssikkerhed og Beredskab)
- Ministry of Children, Senior Citizens, and Housing (Børne-, Ældre- og Boligministeriet)
- Ministry of Social Affairs (Socialministeriet)
- Ministry of Environment (Miljøministeriet)

== Discontinued or former, formal or informal names of ministries ==
Old ministries	Action	Result
Ministeriet for Monarkiets Fælles Indre Anliggender (Ministry of Monarchy Joint Internal Affairs)	disbanded (1858)	Departments merged into Finansministeriet (Finance Ministry)
Fællesindenrigsministeriet (Joint Internal Ministry)	-	Informal name for Ministeriet for Monarkiets Fælles Indre Anliggender (Ministry for the Monarchy Joint Internal Affairs)
Ministeriet for Handel og Søfart (Ministry of Commerce and Shipping)	new name (1914)	Handelsministeriet (Ministry of Commerce)
Ministeriet for Kirke- og Undervisningsvæsenet (Ministry of the Church and Education	split (1916)	Kirkeministeriet (Ministry of the Church) and Undervisningsministeriet (Ministry of Education)
Kultusministeriet (Ministry of Culture)	-	Informal name for Ministeriet for Kirke- og Undervisningsvæsenet (Ministry of Church and Education)
Handelsministeriet (Ministry of Commerce)	new name (1924)	Ministeriet for Industri, Handel og Søfart (Ministry of Industry, Commerce and Shipping)
Ministeriet for Industri, Handel og Søfart (Ministry of Commerce, Industry and Shipping)	split (1929)	Ministeriet for Søfart og Fiskeri (Ministry of Shipping and Fisheries) and Ministeriet for Handel og Industri (Ministry of Commerce and Industry)
Ministeriet for Sundhedsvæsen (Ministry of Health)	disbanded (1929)	-
Ministeriet for Handel og Industri (Ministry of Commercy and Industry)	new name (1935)	Ministeriet for Handel, Industri og Søfart (Ministry of Commerce, Industry, and Shipping)
Landbrugsministeriet (Ministry of Agriculture)	new name (1935)	Ministeriet for Landbrug og Fiskeri (Ministry of Agriculture and Fisheries)
Ministeriet for Søfart og Fiskeri (Ministry of Shipping and Fisheries)	disbanded (1935)	-
Arbejds- og Socialministeriet (Ministry of Labour and Social Affairs)	split (1942)	Arbejdsministeriet (Ministry of Labour) and Socialministeriet (Ministry of Social Affairs)
Trafikministeriet (Ministry of Transportation)	disbanded (1945)	-
Ministeriet for Bolig- og Sundhedsvæsen (Ministry of Housing and Health)	new name (1947)	Ministeriet for Byggeri og Boligvæsen (Ministry of Construction and Housing)
Ministeriet for Landbrug og Fiskeri (Ministry of Agriculture and Fisheries)	split (1947)	Landbrugsministeriet (Ministry of Agriculture) and Fiskeriministeriet (Ministry of Fisheries)
Forsyningsministeriet (Ministry of Supply)	disbanded (1947)	-
Ministeriet for Særlige Anliggender (Ministry of Special Affairs)	disbanded (1947)	-
Ministeriet for Byggeri- og Boligvæsen (Ministry of Construction and Housing)	merge (1949)	Arbejds- og Boligministeriet (Ministry of Labour and Housing)
Arbejds- og Boligministeriet (Ministry of Labour and Housing)	split ((1950)	Arbejdsministeriet (Ministry of Labour) and Boligministeriet (Ministry of Housing)
Krigsministeriet (Ministry of War)	merge (1950)	Forsvarsministeriet (Ministry of Defence)
Marineministeriet (Ministry of the Navy)	merge (1950)	Forsvarsministeriet (Ministry of Defence)
Indenrigs- og Boligministeriet (Ministry of Interior and Housing)	split (1955)	Indenrigsministeriet (Ministry of Interior) and Boligministeriet (Ministry of Housing)
Økonomi- og Arbejdsministeriet (Ministry of Economics and Labour)	split (1957)	Økonomiministeriet (Ministry of the Economy) and Arbejdsministeriet (Ministry of Labour)
Ministeriet for Handel, Håndværk, Industri og Søfart (Ministry of Commerce, Craft, Industry and Shipping)	-	Formal name for Handelsministeriet (Ministry of Commerce) 1957-1979
Ministeriet for Familiens Anliggender (Ministry of Family Affairs)	disbanded (1968)	-
Økonomiministeriet (Ministry of the Economy)	new name (1971)	Økonomi- og Budgetministeriet (Ministry of Economy and Budget)
Ministeriet for Statens Lønnings- og Pensionsvæsen (Ministry of State Salary and Pensions)	disbanded (1971)	Departments merged into Økonomi- og Budgetministeriet (Ministry of Economics and Budget)
Budgetministeriet (Budget Ministry)	disbanded (1973)	Departments merged into Finansministeriet (Finance Ministry)
Økonomi- og Budgetministeriet (Ministry of Economy and Budget)	split (1973)	Økonomiministeriet (Ministry of the Economy) and Budgetministeriet (Budget Ministry)
Ministeriet for Forureningsbekæmpelse (Ministry of Pollution Control)	new name (1973)	Miljøministeriet (Ministry of the Environment)
Handelsministeriet (Ministry of Commerce)	new name (1979)	Industriministeriet (Ministry of Industry)
Ministeriet for Industri, Handel, Håndværk og Søfart (Ministry of Industry, Commerce, Craft, and Shipping)	-	Formal name for Industriministeriet (Ministry of Industry) 1979-1994
Ministeriet for Kulturelle Anliggender (Ministry of Cultural Affairs)	new name (1987)	Kultur- og Kommunikationsministeriet (Ministry of Culture and Communications)
Ministeriet for Offentlige Arbejder (Ministry of Public Works)	new name (1987)	Trafikministeriet (Ministry of Transport)
Undervisningsministeriet (Ministry of Education)	new name (1987)	Undervisnings- og Forskningsministeriet (Ministry of Education and Research)
Kultur- og Kommunikationsministeriet (Ministry of Culture and Communications)	new name (1988)	Kulturministeriet (Ministry of Culture)
Trafikministeriet (Ministry of Transportation)	new name (1988)	Trafik- og Kommunikationsministeriet (Ministry of Transportation and Communication)
Ministeriet for Økonomisk Samordning (Ministry of Economic Coordination)	disbanded (1988)	-
Ministeriet for Skatter og Afgifter (Ministry of Taxes and Charges)	new name (1989)	Skatteministeriet (Ministry of Taxation)
Trafik- og Kommunikationsministeriet (Ministry of Transportation and Communications)	new name (1989)	Trafikministeriet (Ministry of Transportation)
Ministeriet for Grønland (Ministry for Greenland)	disbanded (1989)	-
Undervisnings- og Forskningsministeriet (Ministry of Education and Research)	split (1993)	Undervisningsministeriet (Ministry of Education) and Forskningsministeriet (Ministry of Research)
Forsknings- og Teknologiministeriet (Ministry of Research and Technology)	new name (1994)	Forskningsministeriet (Ministry of Research)
Fiskeriministeriet (Ministry of Fisheries)	merge (1994)	Landbrugs- og fiskeriministeriet (Department of Agriculture and Fisheries)
Industriministeriet (Ministry of Industry)	merge (1994)	Industri- og Samordningsministeriet (Ministry of Industry and Coordination)
Landbrugsministeriet (Ministry of Agriculture)	merge (1994)	Landbrugs- og fiskeriministeriet (Ministry of Agriculture and Fisheries)
Samordningsministeriet (Coordinating Ministry)	merge (1994)	Industri- og Samordningsministeriet (Ministry of Industry and Coordination)
Landbrugs- og fiskeriministeriet (Ministry of Agriculture and Fisheries)	merge (1996)	Ministeriet for Fødevarer, Landbrug og Fiskeri (Ministry of Food, Agriculture and Fisheries)
Fødevareministeriet (Ministry of Food)	merge (1996)	Ministeriet for Fødevarer, Landbrug og Fiskeri (Ministry of Food, Agriculture and Fisheries)
Indenrigsministeriet (Ministry of Interior)	merge (1996)	Indenrigs- og sundhedsministeriet (Ministry of Interior and Health)
Sundhedsministeriet (Ministry of Health)	merge (1996)	Indenrigs- og sundhedsministeriet (Ministry of Interior and Health)
Boligministeriet (Ministry of Housing)	new name (1997)	By- og Boligministeriet (Ministry of Housing and Urban Affairs)
Industri- og Samordningsministeriet (Ministry of Industry and Coordination)	new name (1998)	Erhvervsministeriet (Ministry of Business Affairs)
Forskningsministeriet (Ministry of Research)	new name (2000)	IT- og Forskningsministeriet (Ministry of IT and Research)
Arbejdsministeriet (Ministry of Labour)	new name (2001)	Beskæftigelsesministeriet (Ministry of Employment)
Økonomiministeriet (Ministry of the Economy)	merge (2001)	Økonomi- og Erhvervsministeriet (Ministry of Economic and Business Affairs)
By- og Boligministeriet (Ministry of Housing and Urban Affairs)	disbanded (2001)	Merged with "ErhvervsfremmeStyrelsen" (Business Promotion Agency) into Erhvervs- og Boligstyrelsen (Ministry of Business and Housing)
IT- og Forskningsministeriet (Ministry of IT and Research)	new name (2001)	Ministeriet for Videnskab, Teknologi og Udvikling (Ministry of Science, Technology and Integration)
Videnskabs- og Udviklingsministeriet (Ministry of Science and Development)	-	Informal name for the current Ministeriet for Videnskab, Teknologi og Udvikling (Ministry of Science, Technology and Development)
Erhvervsministeriet (Ministry of Business Affairs)	merge (2001)	Økonomi- og Erhvervsministeriet (Ministry of Economic and Business Affairs)
Energiministeriet (Ministry of Energy)	merge (2005)	Transport- og Energiministeriet (Ministry of Transportation and Energy)
Trafikministeriet (Ministry of Transportation)	merge (2005)	Transport- og Energiministeriet ((Ministry of Transportation and Energy))
Miljø- og Energiministeriet (Ministry of Environment and Energy)	split (2005)	Miljøministeriet (Ministry of the Environment) and Energiministeriet (Ministry of Energy)
Indenrigs- og Sundhedsministeriet (Ministry of Interior and Health)	split (2007)	Ministry of Welfare and Ministry of Health and Prevention
Familie- og Forbrugerministeriet (Ministry of Family and Consumer Affairs)	merge (2007)	Ministry of Welfare
Socialministeriet (Ministry of Social Affairs)	merge (2007)	Ministry of Welfare
Finans- og udviklingsministeriet (Ministry of Finance and Development)	?	?
Integrationsministeriet (Ministry of Integration)	-	Informal name for the current Ministeriet for Flygtninge, Indvandrere og Integration (Ministry of Refugees, Immigration and Integration)

== Sources ==
- Rigsarkivets Samlinger Danish National Archives ("Rigsarkivet")
- Statsministerier - Ministries
