= Jakob Axel Nielsen =

Danish lawyer and politician

Jakob Axel Nielsen (born 12 April 1967 in Hadsund) is a Danish lawyer and politician representing the Conservative People's Party. He has been a member of the Folketing (Parliament of Denmark) from the 2005 to 2010 and was Minister of Traffic and of Energy in the Cabinet of Anders Fogh Rasmussen II from 12 September 2007 to 23 November 2007, and Minister for Health and Prevention from 23 November 2007 to 23 February 2010 in the Cabinet of Anders Fogh Rasmussen III and in the Lars Løkke Rasmussen I Cabinet. Before he was appointed minister, he was his party's spokesman on tax policy.

Nielsen grew up in Hadsund in the region of Himmerland. His father and grandfather were also lawyers whilst his mother was a teacher. He graduated from the Gymnasium (secondary school) in Hobro and was educated in law at the University of Aarhus; he worked as a lawyer from 1994 until 2005 when he was elected to the Folketing.

His grandfather, Knud Axel Nielsen, also a lawyer, was a member of the Folketing for the Social Democratic party 1953-1973 and served as Justice Minister 1964-1968 and 1971–1973.

Political offices
Preceded by Flemming Hansen	Minister of Traffic; 12 September 2007 – 23 November 2007	Succeeded by Carina Christensen
Preceded by Flemming Hansen	Minister of Energy; 12 September 2007 – 23 November 2007	Succeeded by Office abolished
Preceded by Lars Løkke Rasmussen; Minister of the Interior and Health	Minister for Health and Prevention; 23 November 2007 – 23 February 2010	Succeeded by Bertel Haarder
