= Danish Address Register =

Authoritative registry of all streets and addresses in Denmark

The Danish Address Register (DAR; Danish: Danmarks Adresseregister) is the authoritative registry of all streets and addresses in Denmark.

The data is maintained by the local municipalities, and the central IT platform is provided by the Danish Agency for Climate Data (previously Agency for Data Supply and Efficiency and Agency for Data Supply and Infrastructure), a part of the Ministry of Climate, Energy and Utilities.

Data is provided under a Creative Commons license (CC BY 4.0) via download or web services.
