= Ministry of Interior and Health (Denmark) =

Government ministry of Denmark

The Ministry of the Interior and Health (Danish: Indenrigs- og Sundhedsministeriet) is a Danish ministry that has existed three times in the 21st century by combination of existing ministries. The current Minister of the Interior and Health is Sophie Løhde.

== History ==
The Ministry of Interior and Health was first created in 2001 under the first government of Anders Fogh Rasmussen, by combining the Ministry of the Interior (Indenrigsministeriet) and the Ministry of Health (Sundhedsministeriet). The minister was Lars Løkke Rasmussen and the permanent secretary Ib Valsborg, succeeded in 2005 by Christian Schønau. The ministry carried out a far-reaching consolidation of municipalities. After the 2007 Folketing elections, the ministry was disbanded, and its areas of responsibility divided between two newly created ministries, the Ministry of Welfare and the Ministry of Health and Prevention.

The ministry was recreated in February 2010 under Rasmussen's first government as Prime Minister, with the minister being Bertel Haarder and the permanent secretary Kristian Wendelboe. In October 2011 the Rasmussen government was succeeded by that of Helle Thorning-Schmidt, and the ministry's functions were again divided, between the Ministry of the Economy and the Interior (Økonomi- og Indenrigsministeriet) and a newly created Ministry of Health and Development (Ministeriet for Sundhed og Forebyggelse). In December 2022, the Cabinet of Denmark was rearranged, and the Ministry of the Interior was againad combined with the Ministry of Health to form the Ministry of the Interior and Health.
