= Lasse Haugaard Pedersen =

Danish politician (born 1995)

Member of the Folketing
- Incumbent
- Assumed office 1 December 2024
- Preceded by: Dan Jørgensen
- Constituency: Funen

Personal details
- Born: 2 June 1995 (age 31) Odense, Denmark
- Party: Social Democrats
- Education: Aarhus University; University of Southern Denmark

Lasse Haugaard Pedersen (born 6 June 1995) is a Danish politician and member of the Folketing, the national legislature. A Social Democrat, he has represented Funen since December 2024.

Pedersen was born on 6 June 1995 in Odense. His father is a fisherman and his mother is a teacher. His parents divorced when he was eight years old. He grew up in Bogense and was educated at Nordfyns Gymnasium in Søndersø. He was a school friend of Thomas Skriver Jensen.

Pedersen has a bachelor's degree in political science from the University of Southern Denmark (2018) and a master's degree in political science from Aarhus University (2021). He was an executive committee member of the Social Democratic Youth of Denmark (DSU) and has been vice-chairman of the Danish Youth Council since 2023. He was a consultant for the Danish Electrical Association trade union from 2020 to 2024.

Pedersen played an active role in several election campaigns by Dan Jørgensen. It was Jørgensen who encouraged 17 year-old Pedersen to contest the 2013 local election. Pedersen was a member of the municipal council in Nordfyn Municipality from 2013 to 2017. He did not seek re-election at the 2017 local elections in order to pursue his studies. He contested the 2022 general election as a Social Democrat candidate in Funen but was not elected. He was a temporary substitute member of the Folketing for Jørgensen between October and November 2024. He became a permanent member in December 2024 following Jørgensen's appointment to the European Commission.

Pedersen has a son born in December 2024.

Electoral history of Lasse Haugaard Pedersen
Election	Constituency	Party	Votes	Result
2013 local	Nordfyn Municipality	Social Democrats	155	Elected
2022 general	Funen	Social Democrats	2,228	Not elected
