= Ministry of Employment and Gender Equality =

Government ministry of Denmark

- Beskæftigelses- og Ligestillingsministeriet
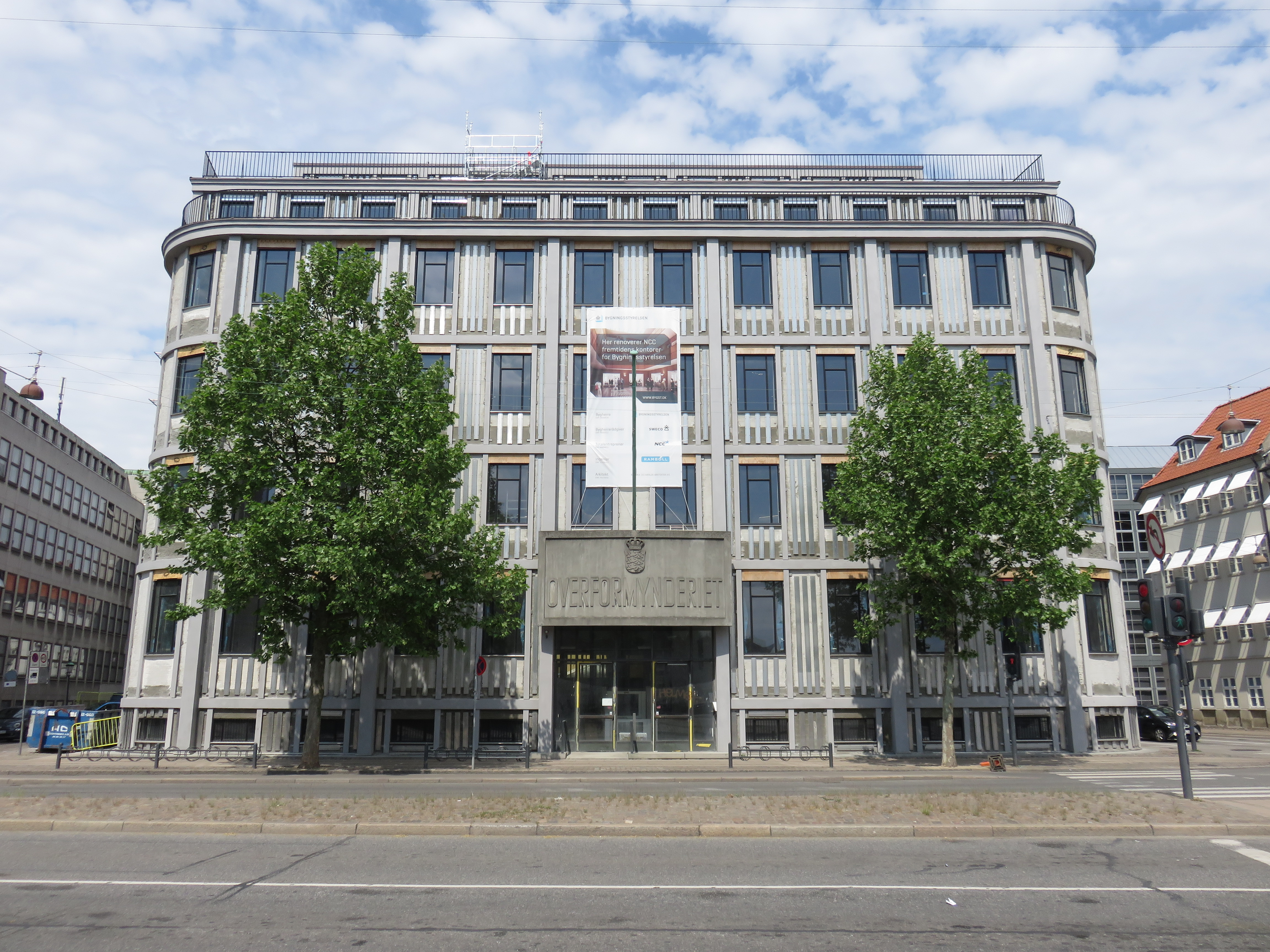
- The current headquarters at Holmens Kanal 20, photographed in 2018.

Agency overview
- Jurisdiction: Denmark
- Headquarters: Holmens Kanal 20, Copenhagen; 55°40′38″N 12°35′02″E
- Minister responsible: Ane Halsboe-Jørgensen
- Child agencies: Danish Agency for Labour Market and Recruitment; Danish Working Environment Authority
- Website: bm.dk

The Ministry of Employment and Gender Equality (Danish: Beskæftigelses- og Ligestillingsministeriet) is a ministry of the government of Denmark.

With the accession of the Frederiksen III Cabinet on 3 June 2026, Ane Halsboe-Jørgensen became Minister for Gender Equality in addition to Minister for Employment; at the same time, the gender equality responsibilities were transferred from the Ministry of Environment to the Ministry of Employment (Beskæftigelsesministeriet), which thus became the Ministry of Employment and Gender Equality.

== Organisation ==
The ministry comprises its department, two agencies and an independent research institution.

=== Agencies and institutions ===
- Danish Agency for Labour Market and Recruitment (Styrelsen for Arbejdsmarked og Rekruttering, STAR)
- Danish Working Environment Authority (Arbejdstilsynet)
- National Research Centre for the Working Environment (Det Nationale Forskningscenter for Arbejdsmiljø, NFA)

== See also ==
- List of Danish government ministries
