= Danish Working Environment Authority =

- Arbejdstilsynet
- The yard of the headquarters of the Danish Working Environment Authority (2022).

Agency overview
- Formed: 1873; 153 years ago
- Headquarters: Copenhagen; 55°42′46″N 12°34′20″E
- Employees: c. 600
- Parent department: Ministry of Employment
- Website: at.dk

The Danish Working Environment Authority (Danish: Arbejdstilsynet) is a Danish agency tasked with ensuring occupational safety and health.
