= Flemming Hansen (politician) =

Danish politician (1939–2021)

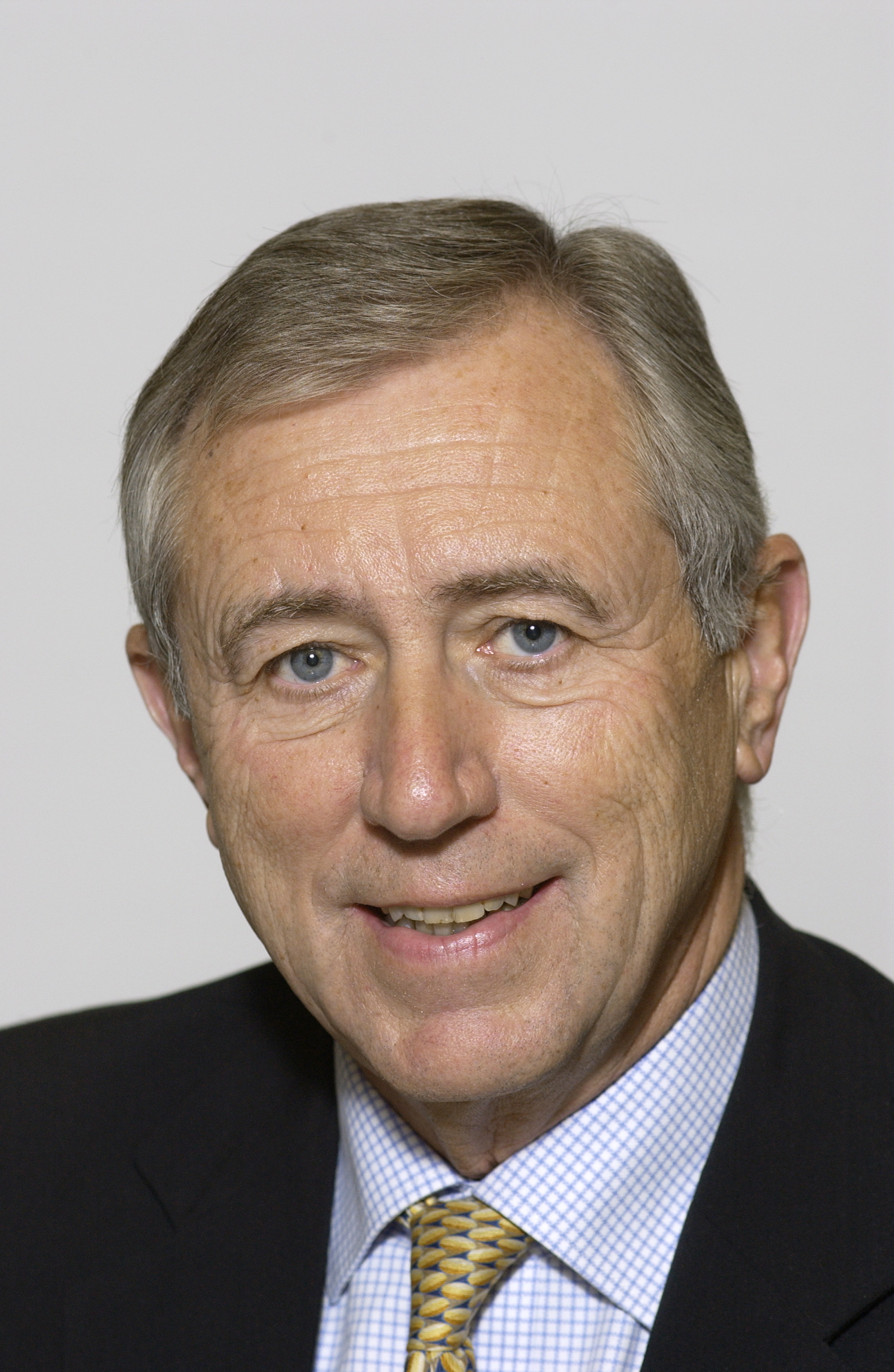
Hansen in 2003

Flemming Hansen (9 August 1939 – 30 April 2021) was a Danish politician representing the Conservative People's Party. He was in parliament from 10 January 1984 to 13 November 2007.

Born in Copenhagen, he was a member of parliament (Folketing) from 1984 and was the Minister of Traffic from 27 November 2001 to 12 September 2007, Minister of Nordic Co-operation from 18 June 2002 to 18 February 2005, and Minister of Energy from 18 February 2005 to 12 September 2007.

He owned shoe shops in Vejle, Fredericia, and Horsens.

Political offices
Preceded by Jacob Buksti	Minister of Traffic; 27 November 2001 – 12 September 2007	Succeeded by Jakob Axel Nielsen
Preceded by Bendt Bendtsen	Minister of Nordic Cooperation; 18 June 2002 – 18 February 2005	Succeeded by Connie Hedegaard
Preceded by Office established	Minister of Energy; 18 February 2005 – 12 September 2007	Succeeded by Jakob Axel Nielsen
