= University of Copenhagen Center for Planetary Research =

Danish research institute

The Center for Planetary Research at the University of Copenhagen was created in February 2001 when the planetary science groups from the Niels Bohr Institute (Danish: Niels Bohr Institutet) (also known as Niels Bohr Institute for Astronomy, Physics and Geophysics; short NBIfAFG) and the Danish Space Research Institute (DSRI) [Danish: Dansk Rumforskningsinstitut, short DRI or DRKI] were merged. It no longer existed in August 2011. Together with associated national and international groups it aimed to strengthen planetary research in Denmark and to provide a platform for the education of planetary researchers. It spanned a broad range of disciplines from astronomy, physics, geophysics, and space instrumentation to geology and biology.

== Purposes ==
The purposes were:

- To gather and develop initiatives in planetary science
- To participate internationally in planetary science missions through development of instruments for ESA and NASA missions
- To use existing and ongoing observations to model the conditions on the planets, moons, asteroids, and meteorites, thereby gaining knowledge on their formation, evolution, and present conditions.
- To create an active, international research environment.

== Partnerships ==
The Center for Planetary Research was partnered with 3 institutes, the Natural History Museum of Denmark, the Niels Bohr Institute and the University of Hawaii at Manoa. The engage in research and information exchange, with the Center of Planetary Research acting as part of the University of Copenhagen. Research at the institute if funded in part by the Danish National Research Foundation and the Natural History Museum of Denmark.
