= Dan Jørgensen =

Danish politician (born 1975)

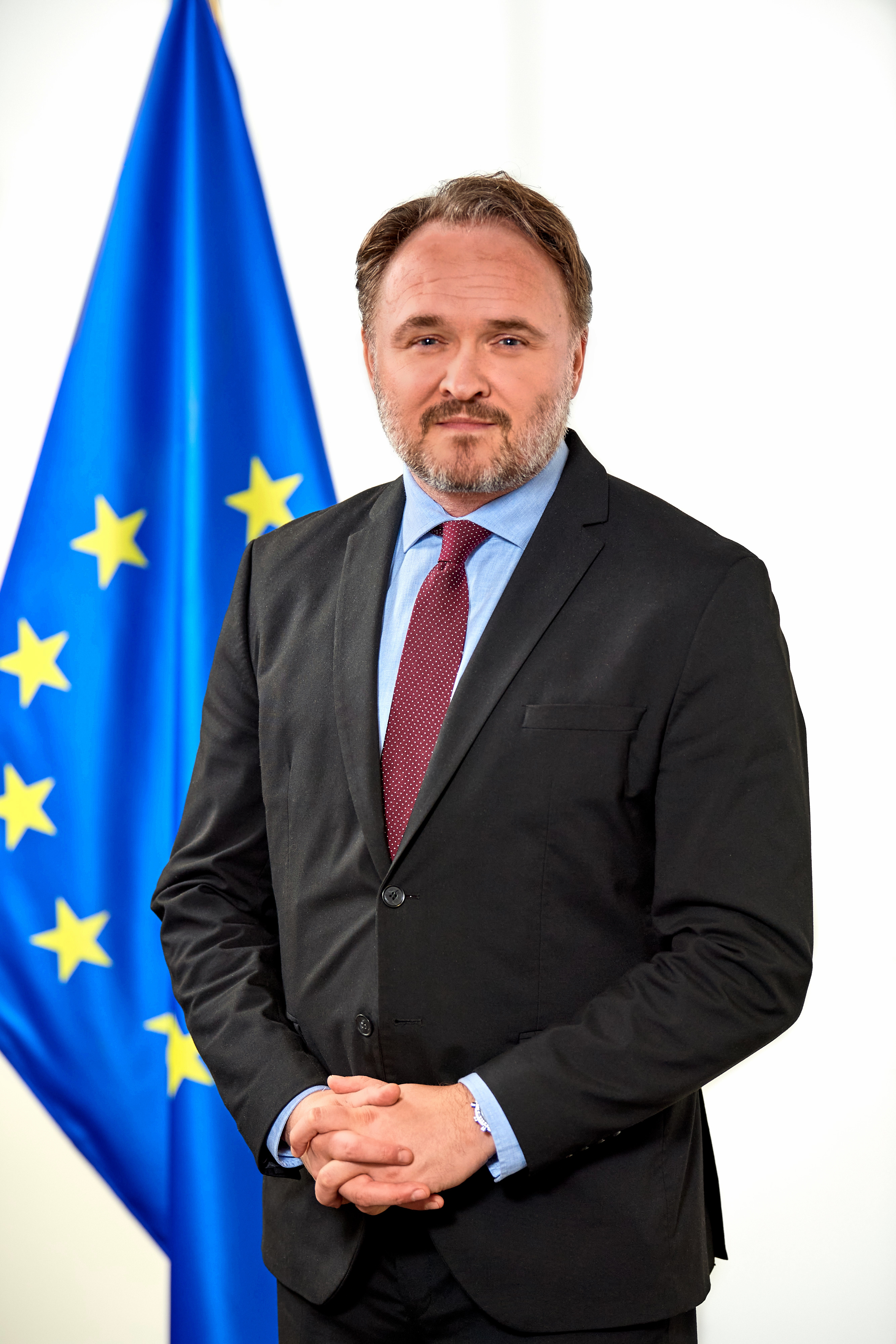
- Official portrait, 2024

European Commissioner for Energy and Housing
- Incumbent
- Assumed office 1 December 2024
- Commission: Von der Leyen II
- Preceded by: Kadri Simson

Minister for Development Cooperation and Global Climate Policy
- In office 15 December 2022 – 29 August 2024
- Prime Minister: Mette Frederiksen
- Preceded by: Flemming Møller Mortensen (Development Cooperation)
- Succeeded by: Office abolished

Minister of Climate, Energy and Utilities
- In office 27 June 2019 – 15 December 2022
- Prime Minister: Mette Frederiksen
- Preceded by: Lars Christian Lilleholt (Energy, Utilities and Climate)
- Succeeded by: Lars Aagaard

Minister for Food, Agriculture and Fisheries
- In office 12 December 2013 – 28 June 2015
- Prime Minister: Helle Thorning-Schmidt
- Preceded by: Karen Hækkerup
- Succeeded by: Eva Kjer Hansen

Member of the Folketing
- In office 18 June 2015 – 29 August 2024
- Succeeded by: Lasse Haugaard Pedersen
- Constituency: Funen

Member of the European Parliament for Denmark
- In office 20 July 2004 – 12 December 2013

Personal details
- Born: 12 June 1975 (age 51) Odense, Denmark
- Party: Social Democrats
- Other political affiliations: Progressive Alliance of Socialists and Democrats
- Education: University of Aarhus; University of Washington
- Website: Party website

Dan Jannik Jørgensen (Danish pronunciation: [ˈtɛˀn ˈjɶɐ̯ˀn̩sn̩]; born 12 June 1975) is a Danish politician of the Social Democrats who has served as the European Commissioner for Energy and Housing since 2024. Within Danish politics, he most recently served as Minister for Development Cooperation and Global Climate Policy in the government of Prime Minister Mette Frederiksen from 2022 to 2024.

Jørgensen previously served as Minister of Climate and Energy and Public Utilities (2019–2022) under Frederiksen and as Minister for Food, Agriculture and Fisheries (2013–2015) under Prime Minister Helle Thorning-Schmidt. From 2004 to 2013 he was a Member of the European Parliament for the Social Democrats, as a part of the Party of European Socialists.

== Early life and education ==
Jørgensen grew up in Morud on the Danish island of Funen, attended high school at Nordfyns Gymnasium, and university at the University of Aarhus, from which he holds a master's degree in political science. He also studied political science at the University of Washington.

Jørgensen was chairman of the Social Democratic student organization Frit Forum Aarhus. His was influenced by the former chairman of the Social Democratic Party and former environment minister Svend Auken, whom he met during his time in Frit Forum.

Jørgensen is an external lecturer and has taught courses on environmental and climate policy at Seattle University and Sciences Po in Paris.

== Member of the European Parliament (2004–2013) ==
Jørgensen became a Member of the European Parliament for Denmark in the 2004 European elections with 10,350 personal votes and re-elected in 2009 with 233,266 personal votes, which is the fourth highest number of votes ever achieved by a Dane in an election to the European Parliament.

In parliament, Jørgensen was the head of the Danish delegation of Social Democrats, the country's largest group at the time. He served as vice-chair of the Committee on the Environment, Public Health and Food Safety from 2004, and was a substitute on the Committee on Economic and Monetary Affairs.

He was president of the intergroup on animal welfare. He was a vocal voice on environmental and climate policy, animal welfare and budgetary control.

In addition to his committee assignments, he was also a member of the parliament's delegation for relations with Iran and a substitute on the delegation for relations with the United States.

== Career in Danish politics ==
Jørgensen was appointed as Minister for Food, Agriculture and Fisheries by Danish Prime Minister Helle Thorning-Schmidt in November 2013.

In February 2014, as Minister for Food, Agriculture and Fisheries, Jørgensen signed a regulation which banned ritual slaughter of animals without prior stunning.

In the 2015 Danish general election, Jørgensen became a member of the Danish Parliament, Folketing. After the election Jørgensen became the party spokesperson on migration affairs until 2017. He was appointed vice chairman of the social democratic parliamentary group until his appointment as Minister of Climate, Energy and Public Utilities in 2019.

From 2015 to 2019, Jørgensen was the vice chairman of the Danish delegation to the NATO Parliamentary Assembly

In 2018, he went viral when he responded to Fox Business host Trish Regan's controversial comparison of Denmark to Venezuela. Regan inaccurately claimed that Denmark's social welfare policies had stripped its citizens of opportunities, similar to the situation in Venezuela. Jørgensen posted a rebuttal video on YouTube, which has millions of views and where shared on several international platforms.

== Minister of Climate, Energy and Public Utilities (2019–2022) ==
Jørgensen became Minister of Climate and Energy and Public Utilities in the Mette Frederiksen cabinet, following the June 2019 election.

Jørgensen and his government have made international news with the agreement to reduce Denmark's territorial emissions by 70% in 2030 compared to 1990, the decision to stop oil and gas exploration after 2050, and the energy islands in the North Sea. Also in 2020, Denmark agreed with Germany on closer cooperation in their offshore wind power development via clusters in the North and Baltic Seas to spur renewable energy and hydrogen production.

Jørgensen and the Danish government's initial proposal for a law on electric vehicles would add 500.000 electric vehicles (incl. plugin-hybrid vehicles) by 2030. Had the proposal been agreed upon, it would have meant more cars with only internal combustion engines than in 2020 in Denmark. Because of pressure from other political parties, it was agreed that there would be 775.000 electric vehicles by 2030.

In June 2022, the government entered into an agreement on a green tax reform. The agreement introduced, among other things, a new CO_{2} tax on industrial companies. Subsequently, Jørgensen said that with the agreement on green tax reform, Denmark has reached more than two-thirds of the way to the goal of a 70 percent reduction in emissions in 2030.

Despite the many agreements regarding the green transition, Jørgensen received criticism that the speed of reductions was not going fast enough. Critics have, among other things, referred to the National Climate Council, which has called for further political steps to reduce the CO_{2} emissions.

Similarly, Jørgensen has been criticised for allowing companies to continue the build-out of fossil fuel infrastructure like a natural gas pipeline of 115 km, with an associated cost of $113 million for Denmark. In a formal answer to the Parliament, Jørgensen confirmed that the gas pipeline would not reduce the carbon emissions in the short term nor add any jobs in Denmark.

Jørgensen received a "nose" in June 2020, a formal criticism by a majority in the Parliament for delaying negotiations with other political parties on biofuels.

The domestic criticism was contrasted to the international mention of Denmark as a green pioneering country. For several years in a row, Denmark has been the best ranked country in the 'Climate Change Performance Index', which is international green organizations' annual ranking of a number of selected countries' climate efforts.

Following the release of the 6th IPCC report, Jørgensen said that alarm bells should ring for anyone having influence on climate politics in Denmark or abroad. He added that Denmark should help other countries copy Denmark's efforts.

In September 2022, Jørgensen proposed introducing an air tax and creating a new route for green domestic flights.

With the agreement between the government and the so-called ‘Green tripartite parties’ in June 2024, when Denmark as the first country in the world decided to introduce a CO_{2} tax on agriculture, Denmark now has the prospect of reaching the 2030 target of reducing by 70 percent in 2030.

Jørgensen is a strong climate change communicator. Examples include a podcast in English called Planet A and a campaign with videos on Facebook advising Danes to put more vegetables in their meatballs. The campaign with Mogens Jensen cost Danish taxpayers 1.2 million kroner.

At the TED Countdown Summit in Edinburgh in October 2021, Jørgensen was invited to deliver a TED Talk about Denmark's climate goals and the country's expansion of renewable energy. His TED Talk has been viewed by nearly two million people on YouTube.

== Minister for Development Cooperation and Global Climate Policy (2022–2024) ==
With the formation of a new coalition government after the November 2022 general election, Jørgensen was appointed Minister for Development Cooperation and Global Climate Policy.

As minister for global climate policy, Jørgensen has played a prominent role in the UN's annual climate summits. Already as climate minister, Jørgensen launched the 'Copenhagen Climate Ministerial', which three years in a row has brought together ministers from all over the world to start the process towards the annual climate summit.

Jørgensen is also one of the architects behind the 'Beyond Oil and Gas Alliance' (BOGA), which Denmark together with Costa Rica launched at COP 26 in 2021. The alliance has brought together a number of national and subnational governments, all of which have set an end date for oil and gas production.

The following year, Denmark helped launch the offshore wind alliance 'Global Offshore Wind Alliance' (GOWA), which aims to secure a minimum of 380 gigawatts of offshore wind globally in 2030 and 2000 gigawatts in 2050.

On 16 May 2023, Jørgensen joined the Advisory Board of the Global Center on Adaptation.

During COP 28 in Dubai in December 2023, together with Barbara Creecy from South Africa, he was appointed to facilitate the negotiations for the so-called 'global stocktake'. The summit ended with a declaration that the world must move away from oil, coal and gas. It was the third year in a row that Jørgensen had a prominent role in connection with the COP negotiations.

Jørgensen has also been involved in the reconstruction of Ukraine, among other things through Denmark's partnership with the city of Mykolaiv. On 29 May 2024, he was awarded the Ukrainian Order of Merit of the first degree by President Volodymyr Zelenskyy.

== European Commissioner for Energy and Housing (2024–present) ==
In late August 2024, the Danish government announced him as their European Commissioner nominee. On 1 December 2024 he was appointed European Commissioner for Energy and Housing in the second Von der Leyen Commission.

== Bibliography ==
Jørgensen has written books about European affairs, climate and environmental policy and Social Democratic history and ideology.

- De rejste sig trodsigt i vrimlen (They rose defiantly in the crowd), Sohns Forlag, 2011 - Editor
- Staunings arv – vejen til et lykkeligt Danmark (Stauning's Legacy – The road to a contented Denmark), People's Press, 2018
- Beyond deniers and believers – towards a map of the politics of climate change, Global Environmental Change, 2015 - Co-author
- Grønt håb – Klimapolitik 2.0 (Hope is Green: Climate policy 2.0), Forlaget Sohn, 2010
- Mellem Mars og Venus – EU's rolle i fremtidens verdensorden (Between Mars and Venus – The Role of the EU in the future world order), Forlaget Sohn, 2009
- Politikere med begge ben på jorden hænger ikke på træerne (2009, Informations Forlag)
- Grøn Globalisering – miljøpolitik i forandring (Green Globalization - Environmental Policy in Transition), Hovedland, 2007
- Eurovisioner – Essays om fremtidens Europa (Eurovisions – Essays on the Future of Europe), Informations Forlag, 2006 - Editor

He hosts the podcast Planet A on climate issues, where he has interviewed prominent figures such as the EU Climate Commissioner Wopke Hoekstra, World Bank President Ajay Banga, and the Executive Secretary of the UN Climate Secretariat Simon Stiell.

Political offices
Preceded by Karen Hækkerup	Minister for Food, Agriculture and Fisheries; 2013–2015	Succeeded by Eva Kjer Hansen
Preceded by Lars Christian Lilleholt	Minister for Climate, Energy and Utilities; 2019–2022	Succeeded by Lars Aagaard
Preceded by Flemming Møller Mortensen	Minister of Development Cooperation and Global Climate Policy; 2022–present	Incumbent
