= Samira Nawa =

Danish politician (born 1988)

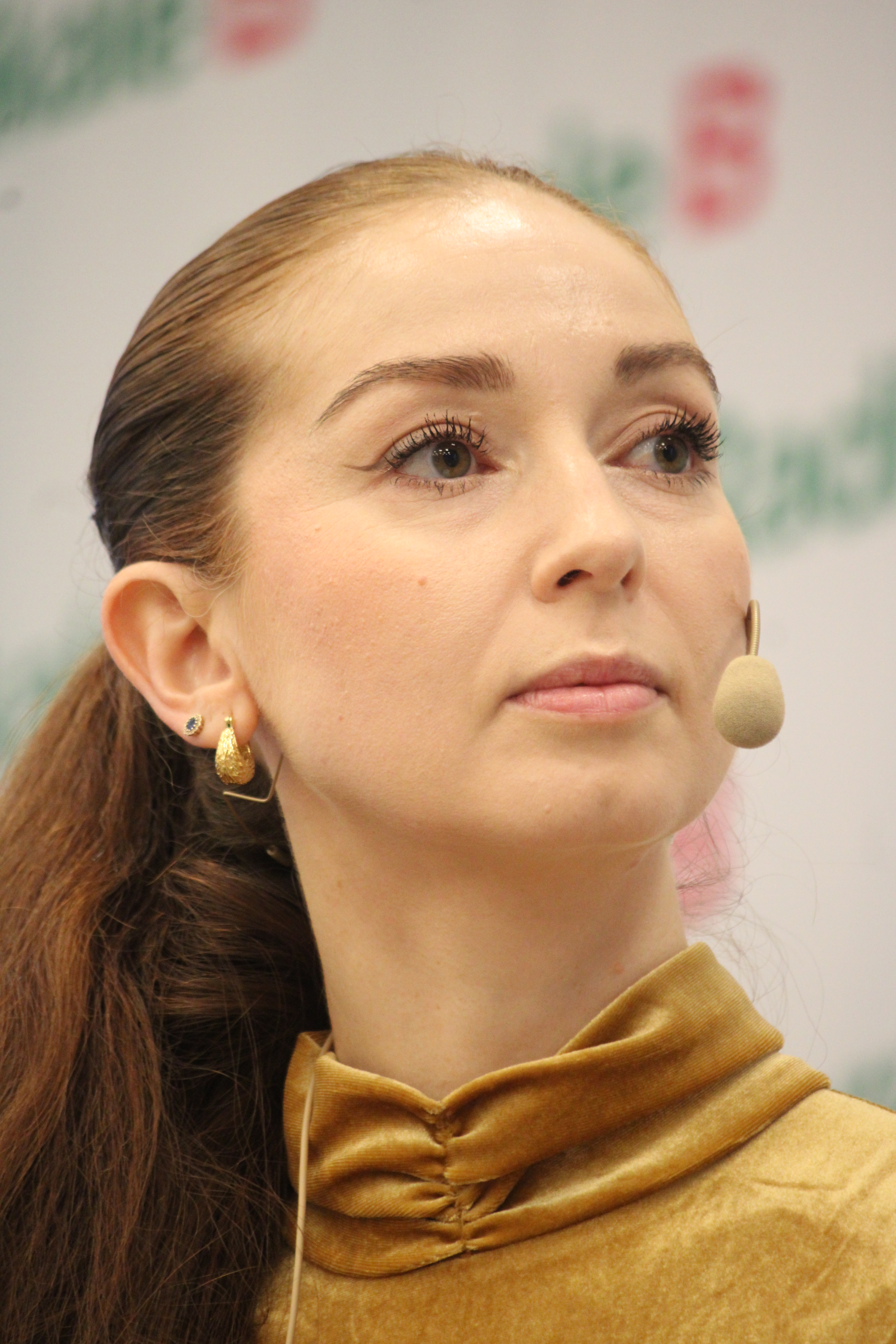
- Nawa in 2026

Minister of Climate, Energy and Utilities
- Incumbent
- Assumed office 3 June 2026
- Prime Minister: Mette Frederiksen
- Preceded by: Lars Aagaard

Member of the Folketing
- Incumbent
- Assumed office 5 June 2019
- Constituency: Copenhagen

Personal details
- Born: 30 March 1988 (age 38) Aalborg, Denmark
- Citizenship: Denmark
- Party: Social Liberal Party
- Spouse: Naweed Amini
- Children: 2
- Education: University of Copenhagen

Samira Nawa Amini (born 30 March 1988) is a Danish politician, who is a member of the Folketing for the Social Liberal Party. She was elected into parliament at the 2019 Danish general election.

== Background ==
Nawa's parents are from Afghanistan, and fled to Denmark to escape the Soviet–Afghan War in 1986. She and her family lived in Pakistan for a time. Nawa is married and has two children.

== Education ==
Nawa was a student of economics at the University of Copenhagen from 2007 to 2014. She graduated with a Master of Science in economics (Cand. Polit.) in 2014.

== Political career ==
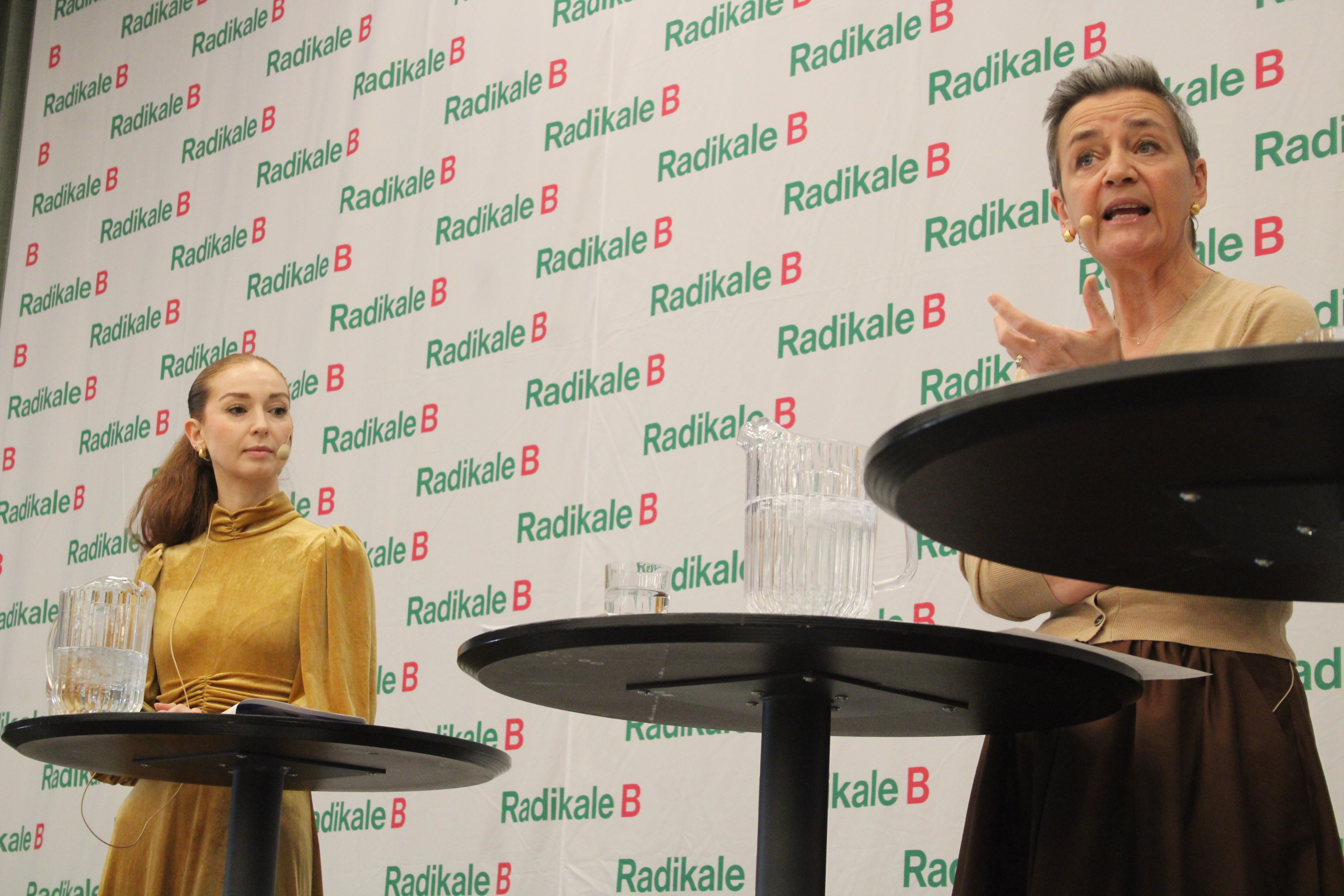
Nawa with Margrethe Vestager in Nyborg, 11 January 2026

Nawa first ran for parliament in the 2015 Danish general election where she received 1,790 personal votes. This was not enough for a seat in parliament, although she was elected as a substitute member. She was not called upon during the 2015-2019 term though. In the 2019 election she received 4,657 votes, securing her a seat in the Folketing.
