= Danish Space Research Institute =

Space agency of Denmark from 1966 to 2005

Danish Space Research Institute (DSRI) (Danish: Dansk Rumforskningsinstitut, short DRI or DRKI) was the space agency of Denmark from 1966 to 2005.

== History ==
It was a Danish sector research institute formed in 1966 under the Danish Ministry for Education and Research, later the Danish Ministry of Science Technology and Innovation. Denmark was a founding member of the European Space Agency (ESA) in 1975 and launched the satellite Oersted in 1999. Europe's space programme: to Ariane and beyond, notes the DRI had budget in excess of 2.6 million Euros supporting a staff of 40 people, with an additional 25 million Euros going to the ESA in 2001.

Its primary areas of research was astrophysics and solar system physics. A great deal of the research was concentrated on X-ray coming from astronomical objects. DRI have had X-ray equipment on board the Russian Satellite Granat and the European EURECA satellite. The now concluded Danish Small Satellite Program, which resulted in the aforementioned Oersted (Ørsted) satellite, was headed by DRI. The DRI space missions were supervised by the Danish Space Board.

On 1 January 2005 the DRI and the geodesy part of Kort & Matrikelstyrelsen merged to form the Danish National Space Center.

The DRI prepared instruments/components for:

- Granat, X-Ray/Gamma-Ray space observatory
- Viking program, Mars lander/Orbiter
- Cluster mission, Earth observation satellites
- International Space Observatory
- Ørsted satellite, Earth magnetic field observations
- Plank mission

As of 2010, the Ørsted is still in orbit and returning data.

== See also ==
- List of government space agencies
- Center for Planetary Research (Copenhagen University)
- Danish Meteorological Institute, cooperated with the DRI
- Copenhagen Suborbitals, Danish amateur crewed space flight
  - Tycho Brahe (spacecraft)
