= Geological Survey of Denmark and Greenland =

Danish research institute

Coordinates: 55.6885°N 12.5818°E

- Danmarks og Grønlands Geologiske Undersøgelse
- Logo

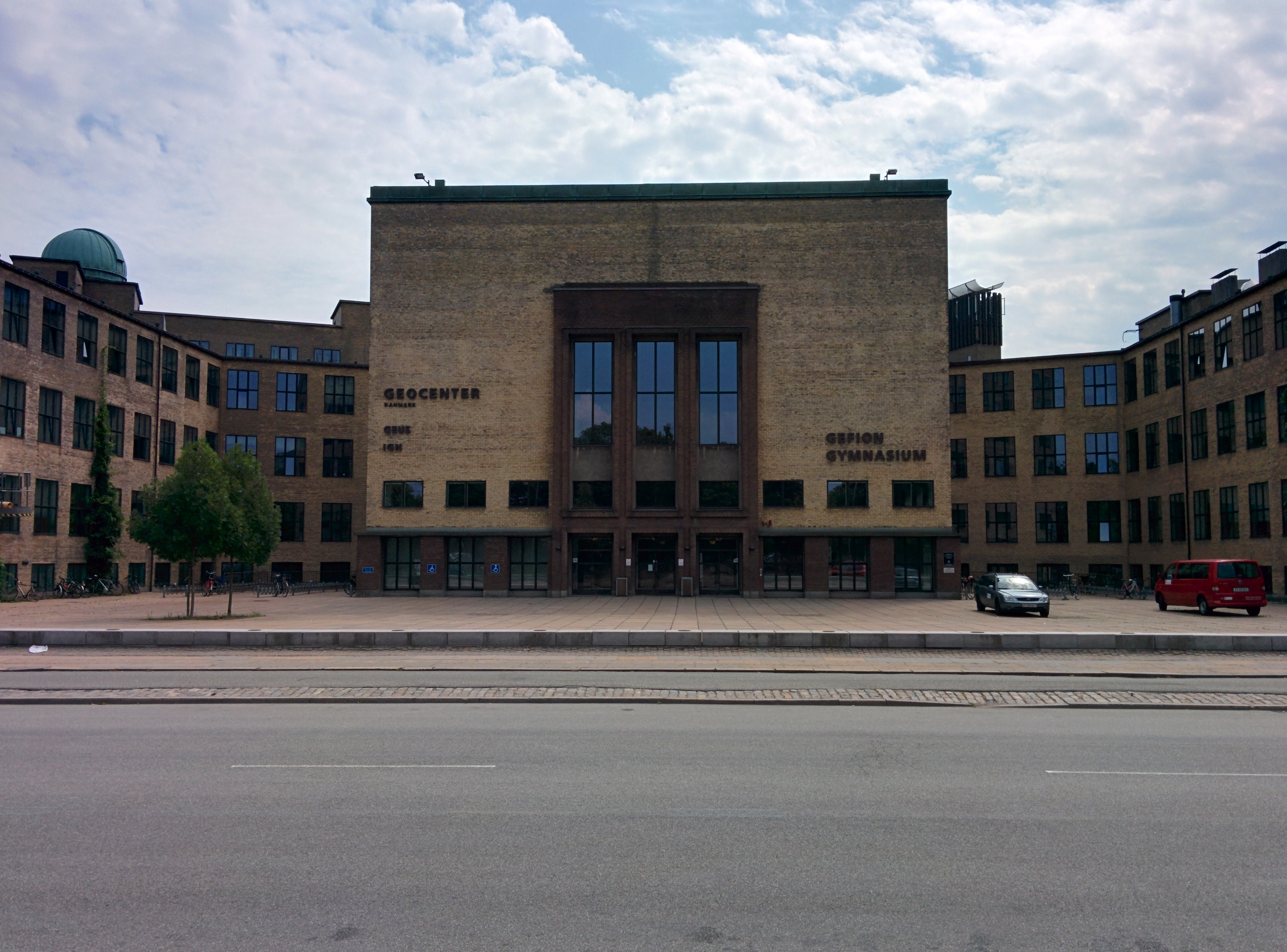
- Geocenter, GEUS and Gefion Gymnasium at Øster Voldgade 10, Copenhagen, Denmark

Agency overview
- Formed: 14 June 1995
- Employees: 300
- Annual budget: 133 million DKK
- Agency executive: Martin Ghisler, Director
- Website: www.geus.dk

The Geological Survey of Denmark and Greenland (Danish: Danmarks og Grønlands Geologiske Undersøgelse, GEUS) is the independent sector research institute under the Danish Ministry of Climate and Energy. Headquartered in Copenhagen, Denmark, GEUS also maintains field offices in Nuuk, Greenland. GEUS is an advisory, research and survey institute in hydrogeology, geophysics, geochemistry, stratigraphy, glaciology, ore geology, marine geology, mineralogy, climatology, environmental history, air photo interpretation, geothermal energy fields concerning Denmark and Greenland.

GEUS works in close cooperation with Geologisk Institut and Geologisk Museum, both part of University of Copenhagen.

It publishes a service paper called Greenland Hydrocarbon Exploration Information Service (GHEXIS) and a newsletter called Greenland Mineral Exploration Newsletter (MINEX) in co-operation with the Bureau of Minerals and Petroleum (Råstofdirektoratet), a secretariat for the Joint Committee on Mineral Resources under Greenland's home rule.

== History ==
In 1888 Danmarks Geologiske Undersøgelse (DGU) was founded.

In 1946, Grønlands Geologiske Undersøgelse was created.

On 14 June 1965, law no. 238 created GGU.

On 23 December 1987, law no. 864 merged GGU into DGU, changing its name to DGGU (Danmarks og Grønlands Geologiske Undersøgelse).

On 14 June 1995, Law no. 408 disbanded law no. 238.

On 20 December 1995, law no. 1076 concerning Danish sector research institutes created GEUS by merging DGU and GGU.

2000s: Increased focus on climate change impacts and Arctic research.

== International Collaboration ==
GEUS partners with institutions like:

- Geological surveys of other Nordiccountries
- European Geological Surveys (EuroGeoSurveys)
- Universities and research organizations

== See also ==
- Geography of Denmark
- Geography of Greenland
- Gemstone industry in Greenland
