= Lars Aagaard =

Danish politician (born 1967)

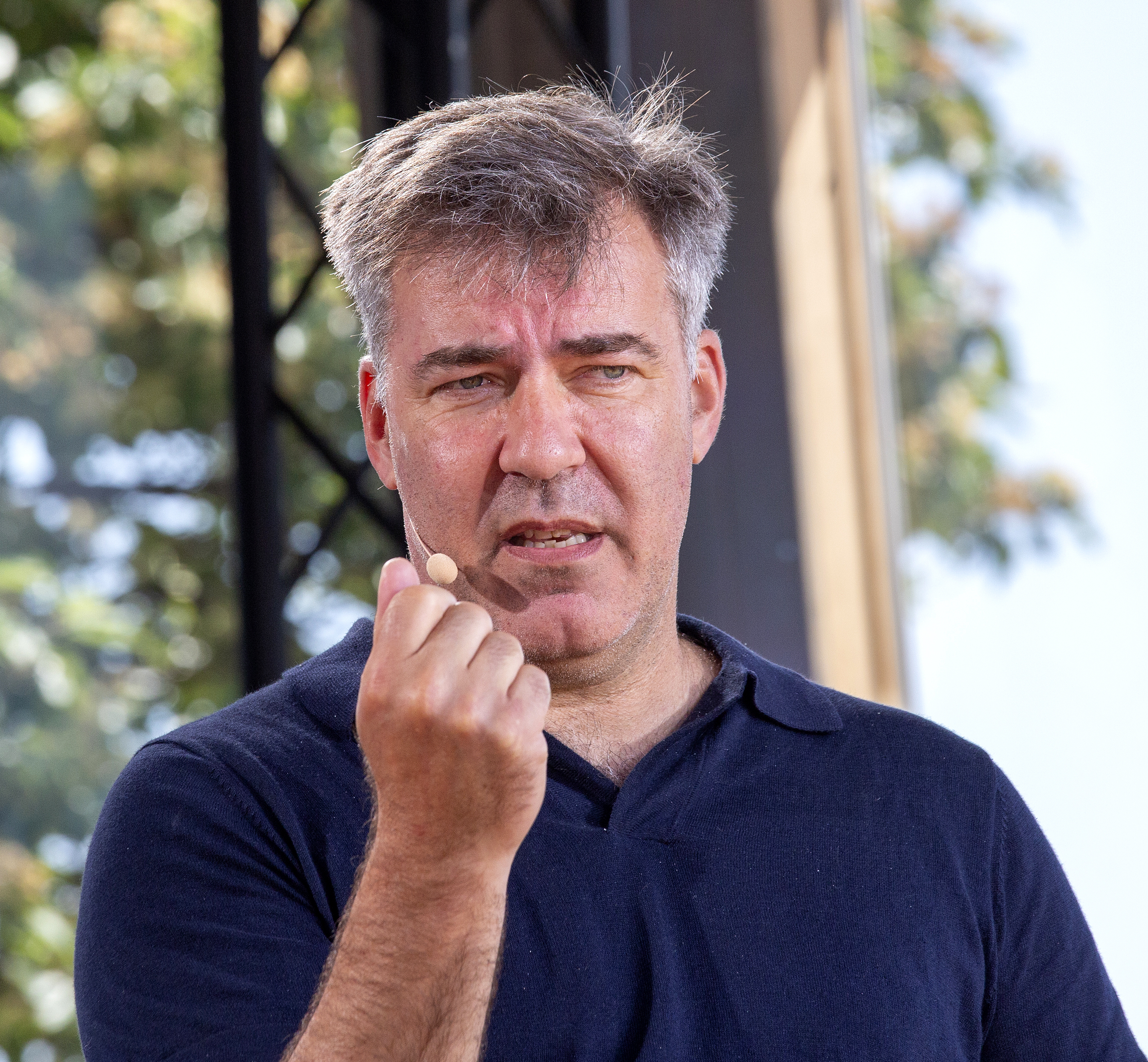
- Aagaard in 2023

Minister for Climate, Energy and Utilities
- Incumbent
- Assumed office 15 December 2022
- Prime Minister: Mette Frederiksen
- Preceded by: Dan Jørgensen

Personal details
- Born: Lars Aagaard Møller; 13 August 1967 (age 59) Odense, Denmark
- Party: Moderates

Lars Aagaard Møller (born 13 August 1967) is a Danish politician with the Moderates. He has been serving as Minister for Climate, Energy and Utilities since December 2022.

From 2009 to 2022, he was director of the industry organization Dansk Energi. He was given a large part of the credit for Dansk Energi becoming an important player in Danish energy policy, but did not continue when the organization changed its name to Green Power Denmark in connection with a merger with two smaller industry associations for wind and solar energy.

== Career ==
Aagaard has a master's degree in Business Administration from Roskilde University which he completed in 1994. He has been employed at the Danish Technological Institute and as a civil servant in the Ministry of Economy and Business and has since been head of Confederation of Danish Industry division of environment and energy department. In 2006 he was employed by Green Power Denmark as the organization's deputy director. In 2009, he became director of the organization.

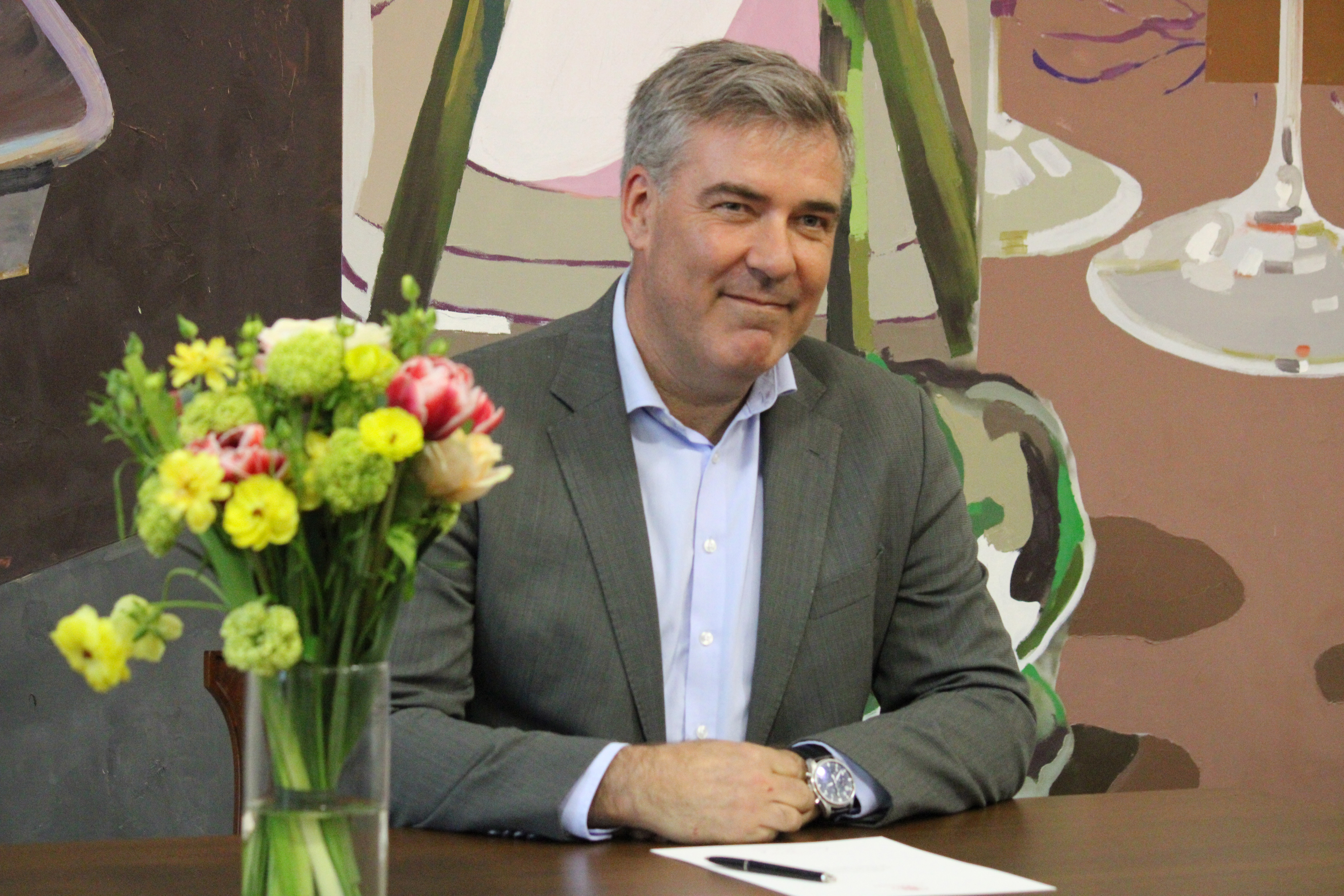
Aagaard signing a pledge to uphold the Danish Constitution at Christiansborg, 14 April 2026

According to a portrait article on Altinget.dk he said that the organization has moved into the "super league for interest protection" when discussing Danish Energy and climate policy. On 15 December 2022, Aagaard was brought in as Minister for Climate, Energy and Utilities i den nye SVM-government. He was not a member of the Danish Parliament when he became a minister.

== Energy policy ==
Aagaard is a prominent debater within Danish energy policy, where he is described as a knowledgeable lobbyist who masters the political game. He has thus, among other things, participated in the debate on the costs of Denmark's green transition and about the Danish energy tax system.

== Position of trust ==
Aagaard sits on the board of Velux Danmark and is deputy chairman of the board of the Technological Institute. He is a member of the energy fund's board and member of the board of Eurelectric - the energy industry's European umbrella organization. In 2017, he got a seat on the Environmental Economic Council, when Dansk Energi got an independent seat on the council.

== Personal life ==
Lars Aagaard lives in Dragør and is the father of two girls. In his younger days he was active in Danish Social Liberal Party.

Political offices
Preceded by Dan Jørgensen	Minister for Climate, Energy and Utilities; 2022–	Incumbent
