= Ministry of Health (Denmark) =

Government ministry of Denmark

- Indenrigs- og Sundhedsministeriet
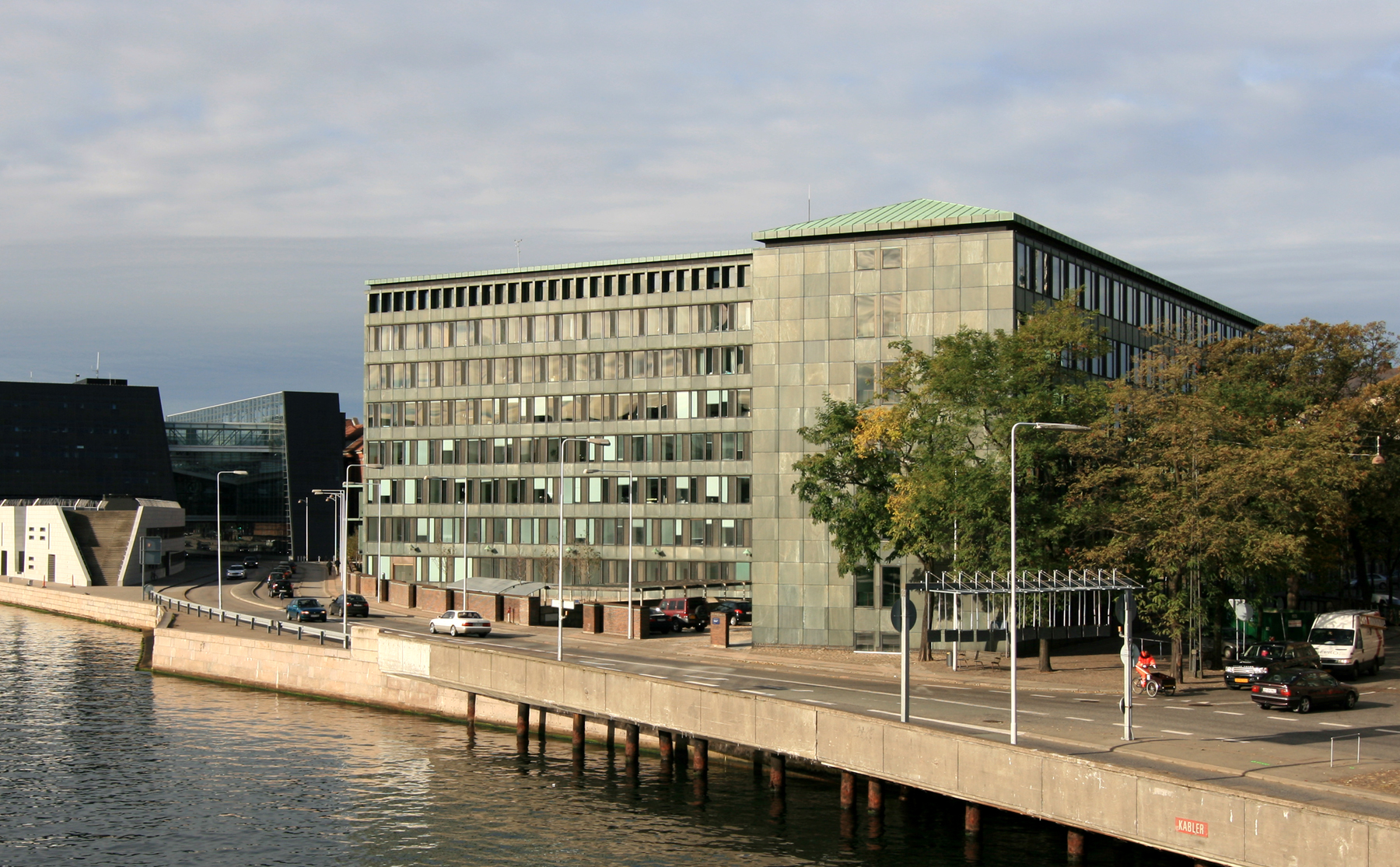
- Headquarters of the Danish ministry at Slotsholmsgade 10-12

Agency overview
- Jurisdiction: Denmark
- Minister responsible: Ida Auken, Minister of Health
- Agency executive: Svend Særkjær, Permanent Secretary
- Website: Official website

The Danish Ministry of Health (Danish: Sundhedsministeriet) is a Danish governmental ministry responsible for healthcare policy in Denmark. First created as an independent ministry in 1926, it has at various times been combined with the Ministry of the Interior as the Ministry of Interior and Health, most recently in 2022-, and has had various names. The current Minister for Health is Sophie Løhde, and the Permanent Secretary since 11 January 2021 is Svend Særkjær.

== Responsibilities ==
The ministry oversees all aspects of healthcare in Denmark, including hospitals, medical treatments, dispensaries, patient rights, healthcare data collection and medical and research ethics.

== History ==
The ministry was first created in 1926, and since then has several times been merged with the Ministry of the Interior and re-established under various official names. In modern times it was first re-established in September 1987, with responsibilities drawn in part from other ministries, including oversight over foodstuffs, anti-narcotics and anti-alcohol efforts, education of medical personnel, and health care in Greenland—some of these were later reassigned—and was recombined with the Ministry of the Interior in November 2001. In November 2007 it again became an independent ministry under the name Ministerium for Sundhed og Forebyggelse (English: Ministry for Health and Prevention), taking on some responsibilities from the Family Ministry, which was dissolved; the Ministry of the Interior, in turn, was merged into a new Ministry of Welfare (Velfærdsministerium). In 2010 the combined Ministry of Interior and Health was again reconstituted, but the following year the Ministry of the Interior was included in a new Ministry of the Economy and the Interior while the Ministry of Health once more became the Ministry for Health and Prevention. In June 2015 it was renamed the Ministry of Health and the Aged, and acquired some responsibilities from the Social- og Indenrigsministeriet (Ministry of Social affairs and the Interior), the combination of the Ministry of Social Affairs and the Ministry of the Interior which was created at the same time. In November 2016, under Lars Løkke Rasmussen's third government, it became a separate ministry once more.

== See also ==
- List of Danish government ministries
- Healthcare in Denmark
