= Ministry of Business (Denmark) =

Government ministry of Denmark

Ministry of Industry, Business and Financial Affairs
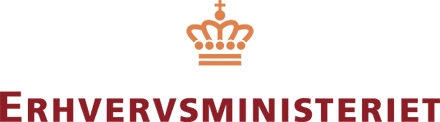

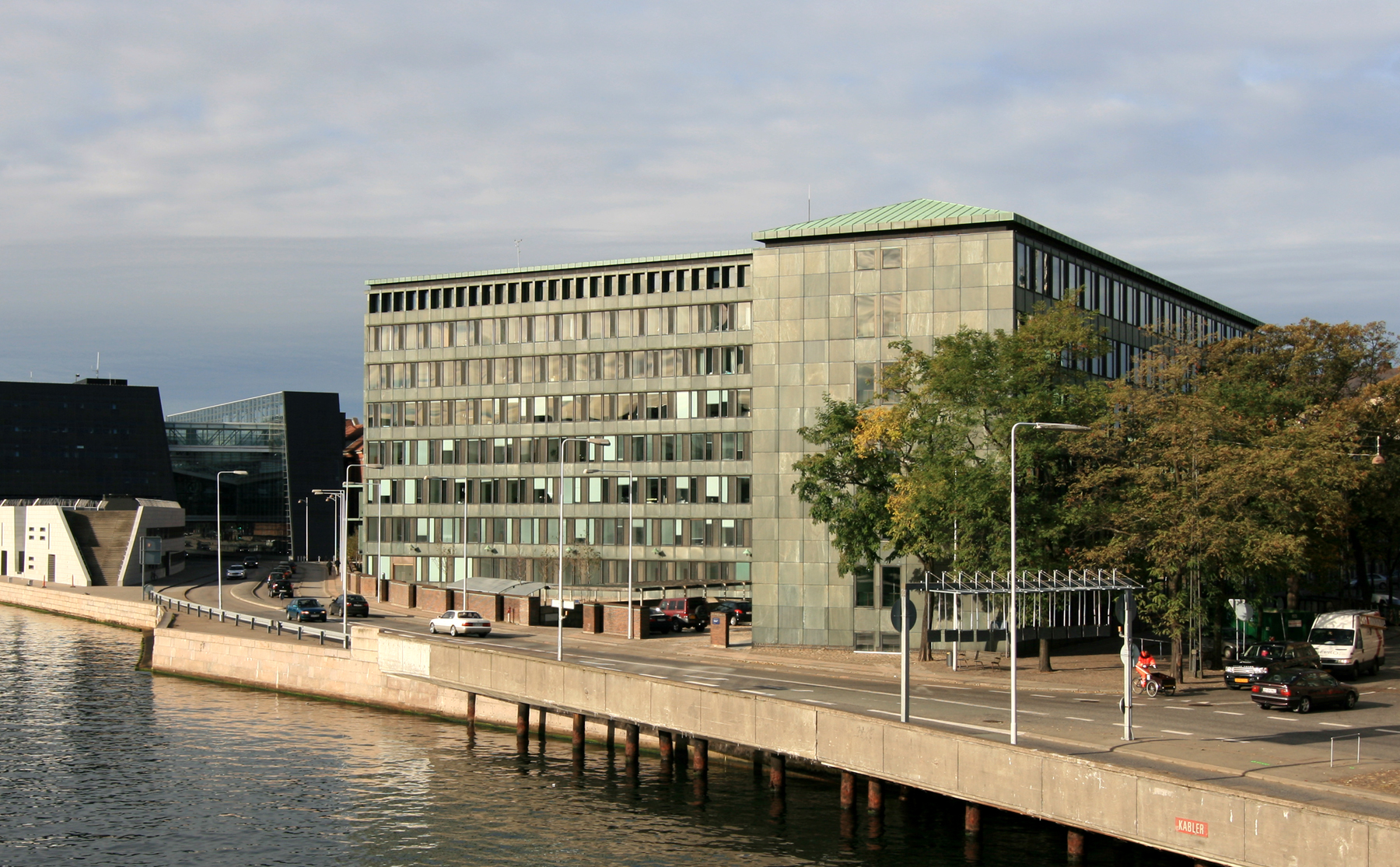
- The Ministry's headquarters at 10–12 Slotsholmsgade in Copenhagen.

Ministry overview
- Formed: 12 October 1908; 117 years ago
- Jurisdiction: Government of Denmark
- Headquarters: 10-12 Slotsholmsgade, Copenhagen, Denmark
- Minister responsible: Martin Lidegaard, Minister of Business
- Ministry executive: Michael Dithmer, Permanent Secretary
- Child agencies: Danish Business Authority; Danish Financial Supervisory Authority; Danish Competition and Consumer Authority; Danish Appeals Boards Authority; Danish Patent and Trademark Office; Danish Safety Technology Authority; Danish Maritime Authority
- Website: https://eng.em.dk/

The Ministry of Industry, Business and Financial Affairs (Danish: Erhvervsministeriet, lit. 'Ministry of Business') is a Danish ministry focused on business policy and economic growth. As of 2022, Morten Bødskov is its minister.

Within the Danish government, the ministry serving this function and occupying this position has changed names several times. Its current name was officially instated by Prime Minister Lars Løkke Rasmussen in 2016.

== History ==
The Ministry of Commerce (Danish: Handelsministeriet) was first established in 1848 with the first cabinet of Denmark which effectively ended the nation's absolute monarchy. Christian Albrecht Bluhme served as the first minister of commerce from 22 March until 15 November, when the office was abolished within the second cabinet of Denmark.

A ministry of trade was not reestablished until 12 October 1908, when the Ministry of Commerce and Seafare (Danish: Ministeriet for Handel og Søfart) was formed. During this period, the ministry oversaw areas of trade and international shipping. In 1979, its name was changed to the Ministry of Industry (Danish: Industriministeriet). The ministry was briefly known as the Ministry of Industry and Business Co-ordination (Danish: Industri- og Samordningsministeriet) during the 1990s, before being renamed as the Ministry of Business in 1994.

In 2001, the ministry was merged with the Ministry of the Economy (Danish: Økonomiministeriet) and jointly became known as the Ministry of the Economy and Business (Danish: Økonomi- og Erhvervsministeriet). In 2011, the economic branch of the ministry was again split off as part of the independent Ministry of the Economy and Interior (Danish: Økonomi- og Indenrigsministeriet), and the trade ministry was reformed as the Ministry of Business and Growth (Danish: Erhvervs- og Vækstministeriet). In November of 2016, Prime Minister Lars Løkke Rasmussen again renamed the ministry. Today, it is known as the Ministry of Business (Danish: Erhvervesministeriet), though in English it is officially referred to as the Ministry of Industry, Business and Financial Affairs.

== Organisation ==
The ministry is led by the Minister of Business, as well as the head of the department and the Permanent Secretary. As of 2023, the Ministry of Business oversees seven agencies as well as several state-owned enterprises, including The Danish Growth Fund and VisitDenmark. Its corresponding agencies are:

- Danish Business Authority (Erhvervsstyrelsen)
- Danish Financial Supervisory Authority (Finanstilsynet)
- Danish Competition and Consumer Authority (Konkurrence- og Forbrugerstyrelsen)
- Danish Appeals Boards Authority (Nævnenes Hus)
- Danish Patent and Trademark Office (Patent- og Varemærkestyrelsen)
- Danish Safety Technology Authority (Sikkerhedsstyrelsen)
- Danish Maritime Authority (Søfartsstyrelsen)
