= Ministry of Environment (Denmark) =

Government ministry of Denmark

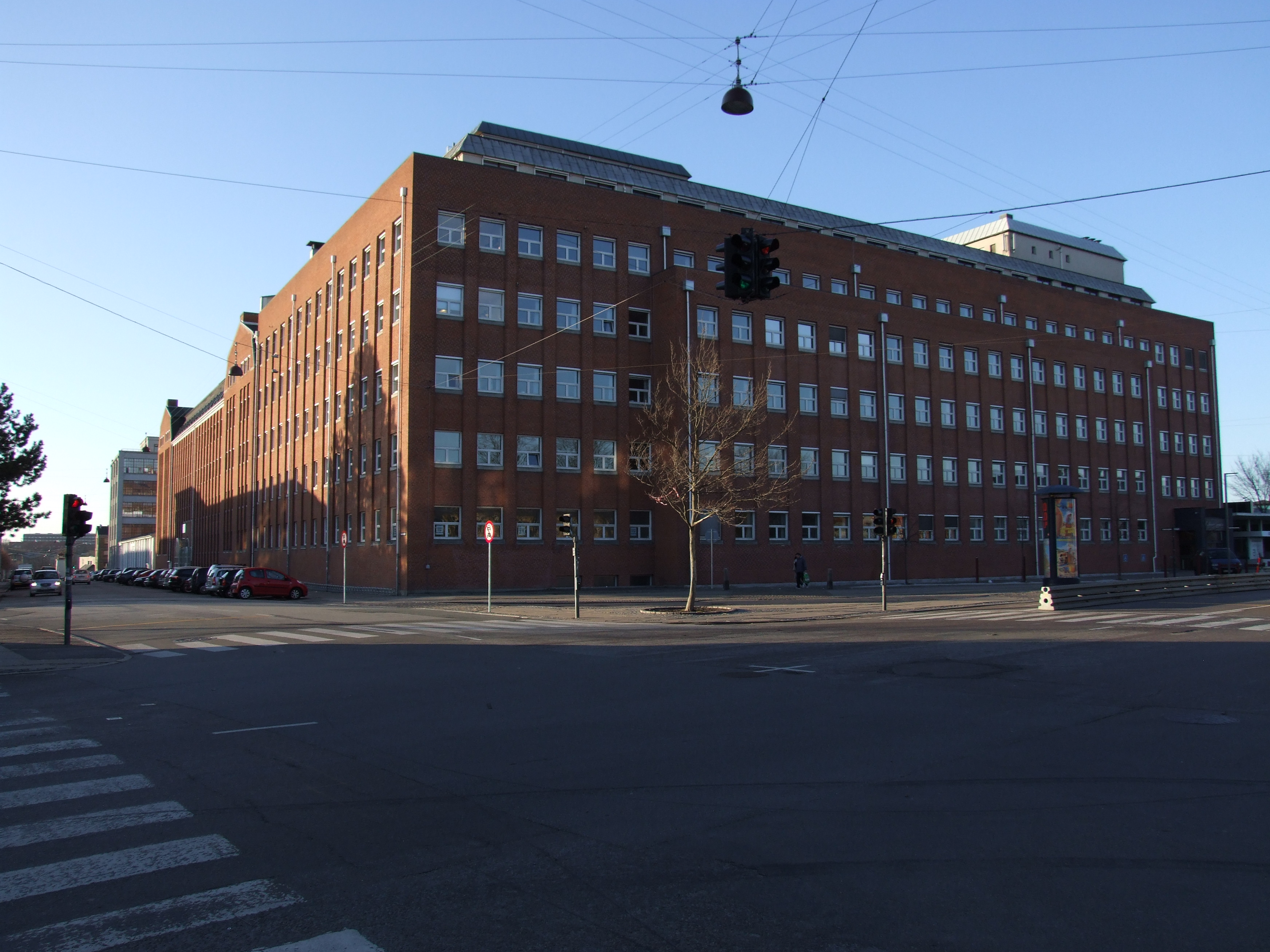
Ministry of Environment head office

Ministry of the Environment of Denmark (Danish: Miljøministeriet) is the Danish ministry in charge of almost all matters concerning environmental issues in Denmark. The head office is in Copenhagen.

Created in 1971 as the Ministry of Pollution Combating ("Ministeriet for forureningsbekæmpelse"), it changed its name in 1973 to the current Ministry of the Environment. However, from 1994 to 2005 it was known as the Ministry of Environment and Energy ("Miljø- og Energiministeriet"), as the ministry was merged with the Ministry of Energy. In 2005, the energy sector was detached again and the ministry reverted to the old name.

In a press release on 21 March 2007, the ministry announced that it would be hosting the COP-15 summit in 2009. COP 15 took place in Copenhagen from 7 December to 18 December 2009.

== Agencies and institutions ==
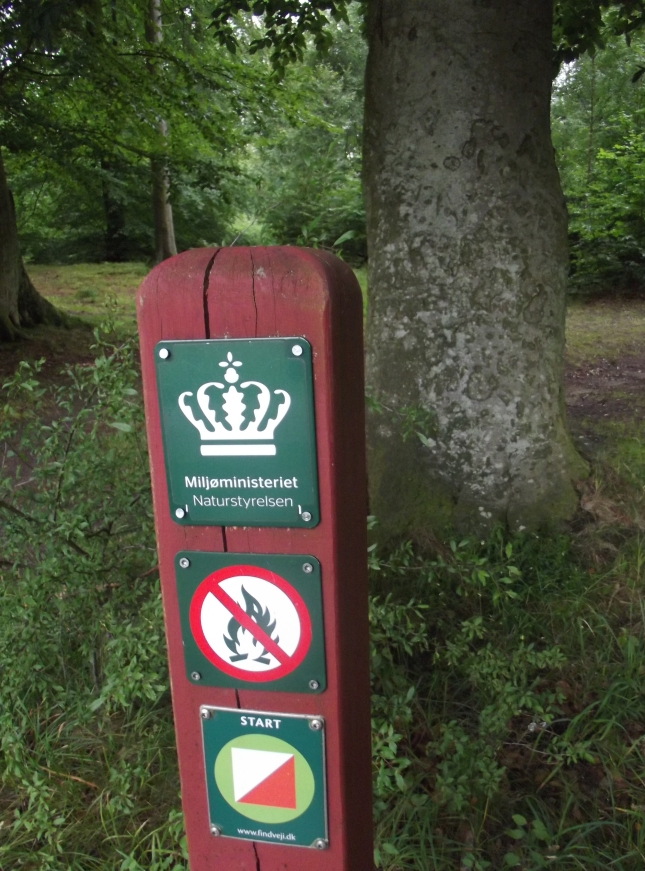
Ministry mark in a nature park (Teglstrup Hegn)

- Danmarks Miljøportal (The Danish Nature & Environment Portal)
- Geodatastyrelsen (Danish Geodata Agency)
- Naturstyrelsen (Danish Nature Agency) (created on 1 January 2011 by a merger of By- og Landskabsstyrelsen (City and Landscape Agency) and Danish Forest and Nature Agency (Skov- og Naturstyrelsen)).
- Miljøstyrelsen (Environment Agency)
- Natur- og Miljøklagenævnet (created on 1 January 2011 by a merger of Miljøklagenævnet and Naturklagenævnet)

== See also ==
- Wind power in Denmark
- Minister for the Environment (Denmark)
