= Ministry of Climate, Energy and Utilities (Denmark) =

Government ministry of Denmark

- Klima-, Energi- og Forsyningsministeriet
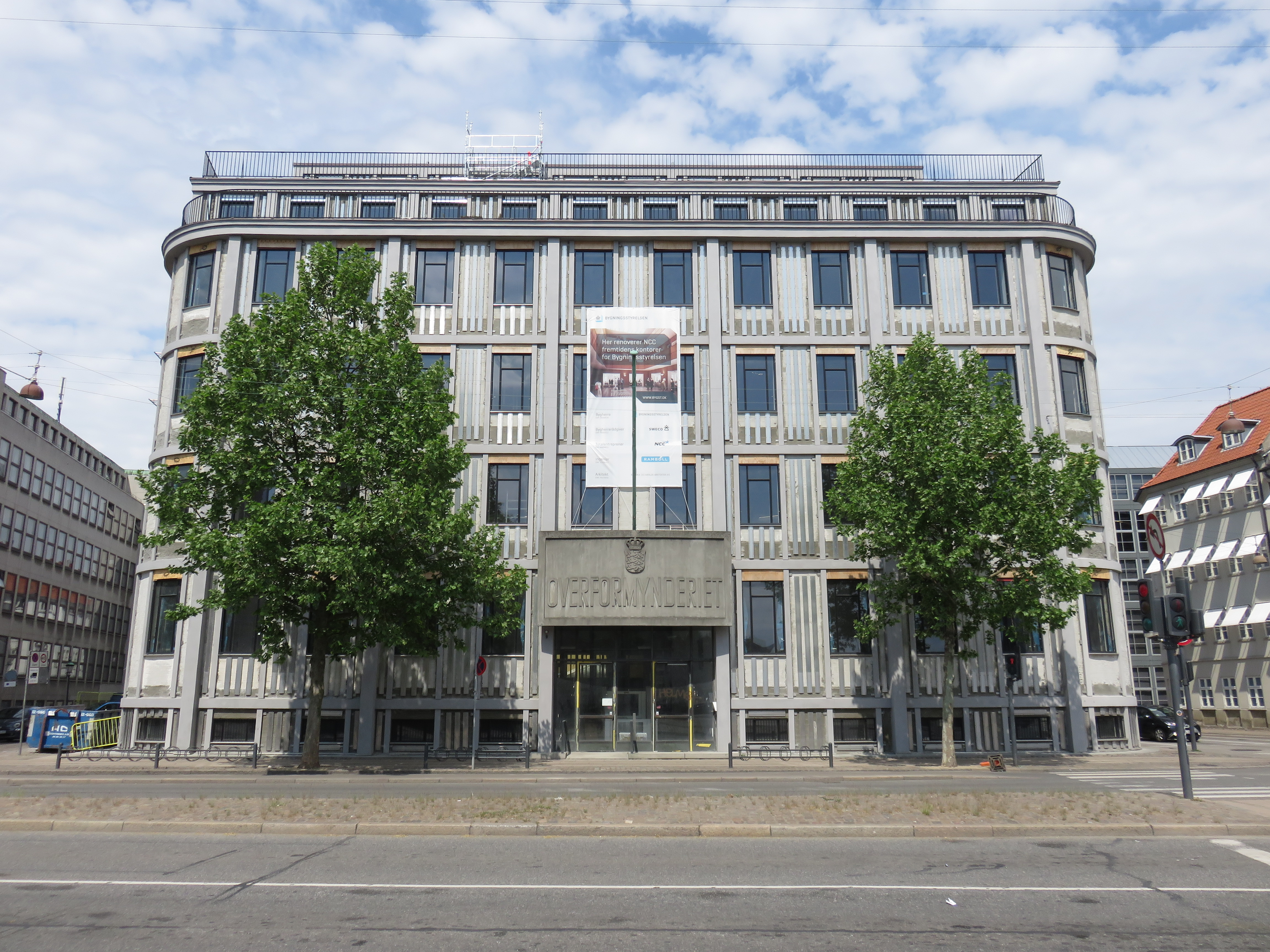
- The ministry's main office

Ministry overview
- Preceding agencies: Ministry of Transport and Energy (partially); Ministry of Environment (partially)
- Jurisdiction: Denmark
- Headquarters: Holmens Kanal 20
- Minister responsible: Samira Nawa, Minister of Climate, Energy and Utilities
- Ministry executive: Lars Frelle-Petersen, Permanent Secretary
- Website: Official website

The Danish Ministry of Climate, Energy and Utilities (Danish: Klima-, Energi- og Forsyningsministeriet) is a governmental agency in Denmark. It is responsible for national climate policy and international cooperation on climate change, as well as energy issues, meteorology and national geological surveys in Denmark and Greenland.

== History ==
The predecessor of the Ministry of Climate and Energy, the Ministry of Energy (Danish: Energiministeriet), was created in 1979, from the energy department of the Ministry of Trade. In 1994, it was merged with Ministry of the Environment and in 2005 it was detached from that ministry, to be merged with Ministry of Transport and Energy.

On 23 November 2007, the energy issues were de-merged from the Ministry of Transport and climate issues were de-merged from the Ministry of Environment and the Ministry of Climate and Energy was created.

In 2019, the name changed from the Ministry of Energy, Utilities and Climate to the Ministry of Climate, Energy and Utilities. The change in word order was criticized as it cost 141.546 DKK (€18,989).

== Agencies ==
A number of agencies belong to the ministry:

- Danish Geodata Agency (Geodatastyrelsen)
- Danish Energy Agency (Energistyrelsen)
- Climate Data Agency (Klimadatastyrelsen)
- Danish Meteorological Institute (Danmarks Meteorologiske Institut; DMI)
- Geological Survey of Denmark and Greenland (Danmarks og Grønlands Geologiske Undersøgelse; GEUS)
- Public Utilities Authority (Forsyningstilsynet)
- Energinet
- Climate council (Klimarådet)

== See also ==
- Electricity sector in Denmark
