= Frederiksen II Cabinet =

Government of Denmark from 2022 to 2026

Second cabinet of Mette Frederiksen
- 79th Cabinet of Denmark
- 2022–2026
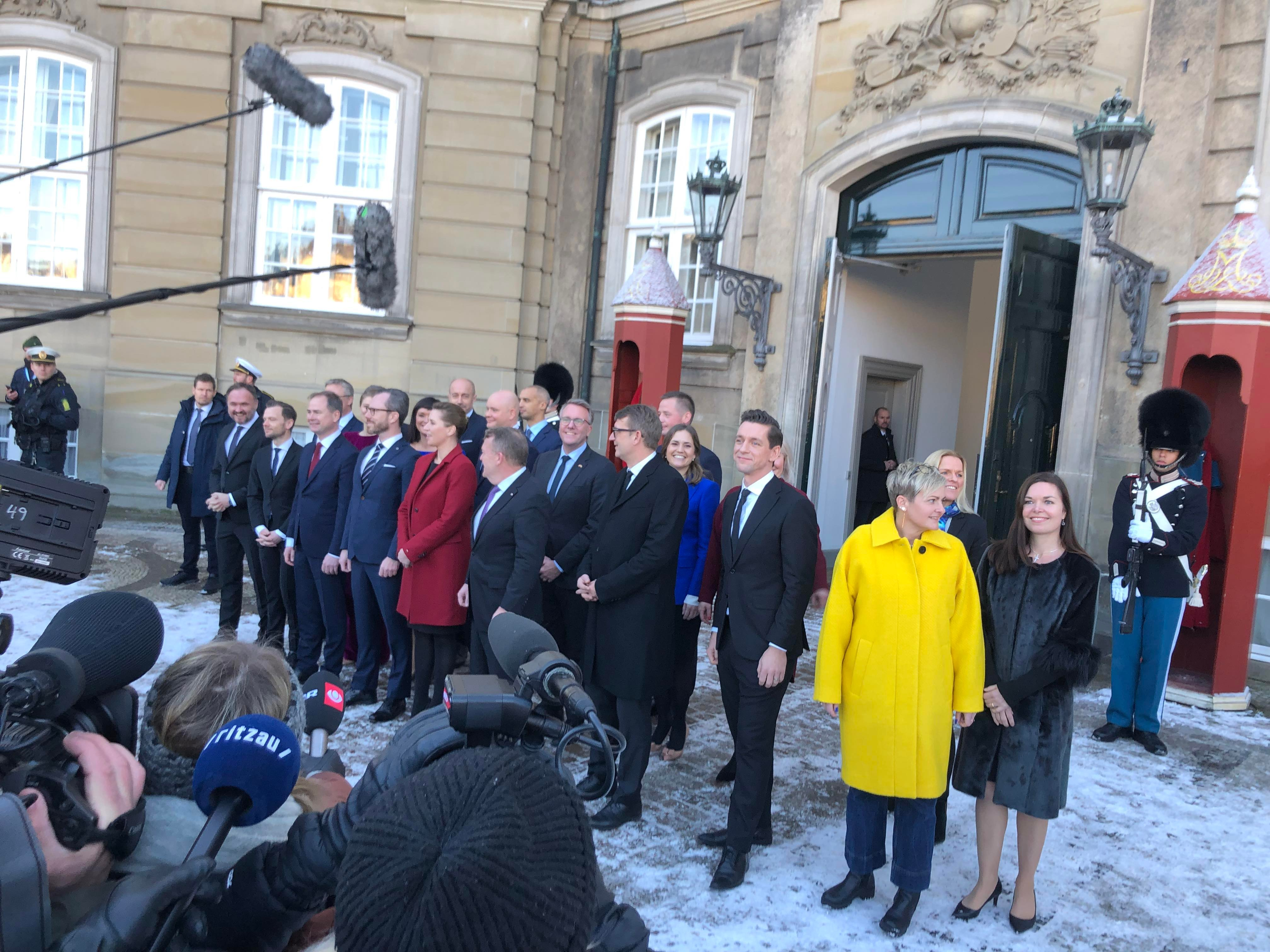
- Presentation of the cabinet, 2022
- Date formed: 15 December 2022
- Date dissolved: 3 June 2026

People and organisations
- Monarch: Margrethe II (until 2024); Frederik X (2024–2026)
- Prime Minister: Mette Frederiksen
- Vice-Prime Minister: Troels Lund Poulsen
- No. of ministers: 25; 23 (until 2024)
- Member parties: Social Democrats; Venstre; Moderates; Supported by: Union Party; Social Democratic Party (Faroese); Siumut (2022–2025); Inuit Ataqatigiit; Independent (1); Naleraq
- Status in legislature: Minority coalition government
- Opposition parties: Green Left; Denmark Democrats; Liberal Alliance; The Conservatives; Red–Green Alliance; Alternative; Social Liberals; Danish People's Party

History
- Legislature term: 2022–2026
- Predecessor: Frederiksen I
- Successor: Frederiksen III

The Second cabinet of Mette Frederiksen, colloquially known as the SVM government (Danish: SVM-regeringen), was the government of Denmark, which took office on 15 December 2022. It succeeded the Frederiksen I Cabinet following the 2022 Danish general election. It was the first cabinet in more than 40 years that the Social Democrats and Venstre, two historical political rivals, have been together in.

Headed by Prime Minister Mette Frederiksen, it was a centrist government, consisting of the Social Democrats, Venstre, and the Moderates. It was announced on 13 December following a record 42 days of negotiations. The government was supported by the Union Party and the Social Democratic Party from the Faroe Islands, as well as Naleraq and Inuit Ataqatigiit from Greenland. As the government had 90 of the 179 seats in the Folketing with its support parties, it effectively operated as a majority government.

Following the 2026 election, on 25 March Frederiksen presented her resignation to Frederik X, and took on the role of caretaker government, until a new government can be presented. On 1 June 2026, following long post-election negotiations, it was announced that the government would be succeeded by the Frederiksen III Cabinet.

== List of ministers ==
Portfolio	Minister	Took office	Left office	Party	Ref
Prime Minister	Mette Frederiksen	27 June 2019	3 June 2026	Social Democrats	
Deputy Prime Minister	Jakob Ellemann-Jensen	15 December 2022	23 October 2023	Venstre	
Deputy Prime Minister	Troels Lund Poulsen	23 October 2023	3 June 2026	Venstre	
Minister of Defence	Jakob Ellemann-Jensen	15 December 2022	22 August 2023	Venstre	
Minister of Defence	Troels Lund Poulsen	22 August 2023	3 June 2026	Venstre	
Minister of Foreign Affairs	Lars Løkke Rasmussen	15 December 2022	3 June 2026	Moderates	
Minister of Finance	Nicolai Wammen	27 June 2019	3 June 2026	Social Democrats	
Minister of the Interior and Health	Sophie Løhde	15 December 2022	3 June 2026	Venstre	
Minister of Justice	Peter Hummelgaard Thomsen	15 December 2022	3 June 2026	Social Democrats	
Minister of Culture	Jakob Engel-Schmidt	15 December 2022	3 June 2026	Moderates	
Minister of Economic Affairs	Troels Lund Poulsen (Note: Acting Minister for Defence from 6 February 2023 to 1 August 2023.)	15 December 2022	22 August 2023	Venstre	
Minister of Economic Affairs	Jakob Ellemann-Jensen	22 August 2023	23 October 2023	Venstre	
Minister of Economic Affairs	Troels Lund Poulsen	23 October 2023	23 November 2023	Venstre	
Minister of Economic Affairs	Stephanie Lose	23 November 2023	3 June 2026	Venstre	
Minister without portfolio (Note: Acting Minister for Economy during her term in office.)	Stephanie Lose	9 March 2023	1 August 2023	Venstre	
Minister of Business Affairs	Morten Bødskov	15 December 2022	3 June 2026	Social Democrats	
Minister of Development Cooperation and Global Climate Policy	Dan Jørgensen	15 December 2022	29 August 2024	Social Democrats	
Minister of the Environment and Equality (Note: Title was Minister of the Environment prior to 29 August 2024)	Magnus Heunicke	15 December 2022	3 June 2026	Social Democrats	
Minister of Employment	Ane Halsboe-Jørgensen	15 December 2022	23 September 2025	Social Democrats	
Minister of Employment	Kaare Dybvad	23 September 2025	3 June 2026	Social Democrats	
Minister of Children and Education	Mattias Tesfaye	15 December 2022	3 June 2026	Social Democrats	
Minister of Immigration and Integration	Kaare Dybvad	2 May 2022	23 September 2025	Social Democrats	
Minister of Immigration and Integration	Rasmus Stoklund	23 September 2025	3 June 2026	Social Democrats	
Minister of Green Transition	Jeppe Bruus Christensen	29 August 2024	3 June 2026	Social Democrats	
Minister of Food, Agriculture, Fisheries	Jacob Jensen	15 December 2022	3 June 2026	Venstre	
Minister of Transport	Thomas Danielsen	15 December 2022	3 June 2026	Venstre	
Minister of Higher Education and Science	Christina Egelund (Note: Not an MP when appointed.)	15 December 2022	3 June 2026	Moderates	
Minister of Elderly Affairs	Mette Kierkgaard	15 December 2022	3 February 2026	Moderates	
Minister of Elderly Affairs	Henrik Frandsen	3 February 2026	3 June 2026	Moderates	
Minister of Climate, Energy and Utilities	Lars Aagaard	15 December 2022	3 June 2026	Moderates	
Minister of European Affairs	Marie Bjerre	29 August 2024	3 June 2026	Venstre	
Minister of Cities and Rural Areas, Minister of Ecclesiastical Affairs, and Minister of Nordic Cooperation (Note: Title was Minister of Ecclesiastical Affairs, Minister of Rural Areas, and Minister of Nordic Cooperation prior to 23 November 2023)	Louise Schack Elholm	15 December 2022	23 November 2023	Venstre	
Minister of Cities and Rural Areas, Minister of Ecclesiastical Affairs, and Minister of Nordic Cooperation	Morten Dahlin	23 November 2023	3 June 2026	Venstre	
Minister of National Safety and Emergency Management	Torsten Schack Pedersen	29 August 2024	3 June 2026	Venstre	
Minister of Social Affairs and Housing	Pernille Rosenkrantz-Theil	15 December 2022	29 August 2024	Social Democrats	
Minister of Social Affairs and Housing	Sophie Hæstorp Andersen (Note: Not an MP when appointed.)	29 August 2024	3 June 2026	Social Democrats	
Minister of Taxation	Jeppe Bruus Christensen	4 February 2022	29 August 2024	Social Democrats	
Minister of Taxation	Rasmus Stoklund	29 August 2024	25 September 2025	Social Democrats	
Minister of Taxation	Ane Halsboe-Jørgensen	23 September 2025	3 June 2026	Social Democrats	
Minister of Digital Government (Note: Title was Minister for Digitalization and Equality prior to 29 August 2024)	Marie Bjerre	15 December 2022	23 November 2023	Venstre	
Minister of Digital Government	Mia Wagner	23 November 2023	7 December 2023	Venstre	
Minister of Digital Government	Marie Bjerre	7 December 2023	29 August 2024	Venstre	
Minister of Digital Government	Caroline Stage Olsen	29 August 2024	3 June 2026	Moderates	

== See also ==
- Grand coalition

== Notes ==
Preceded by Frederiksen I	Cabinet of Denmark; 2022–2026	Succeeded by Frederiksen III
