= Statistics Denmark =

Danish governmental organization

Coordinates: 55.7105°N 12.5632°E

- Danmarks Statistik
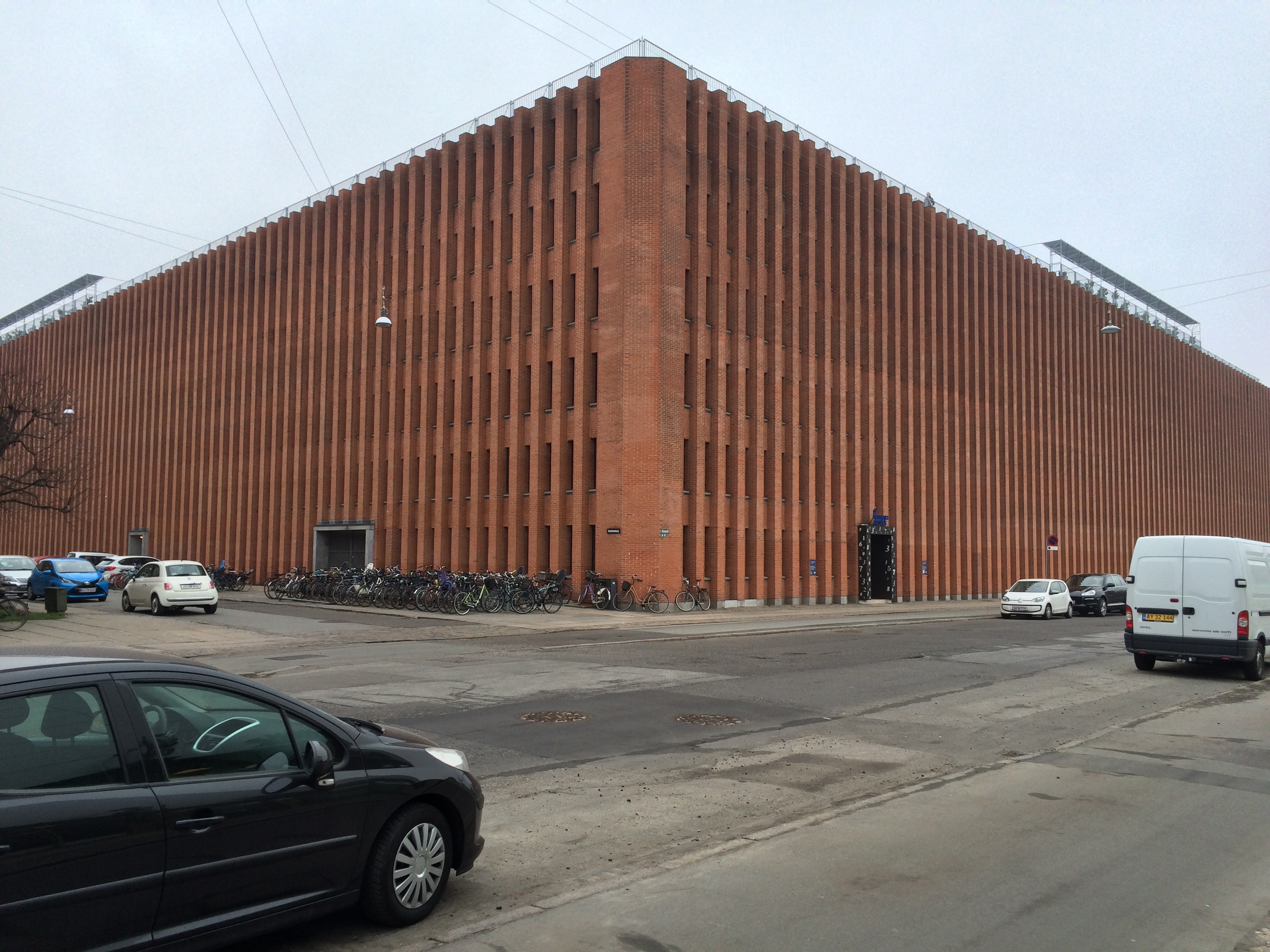

Agency overview
- Formed: January 1850; 176 years ago
- Type: National statistical service
- Jurisdiction: Denmark
- Minister responsible: Christina Egelund, Minister for Digital Government
- Agency executive: Martin Ulrik Jensen, Director General (Rigsstatistiker)
- Parent department: Ministry for Digital Affairs
- Website: www.dst.dk

Statistics Denmark (Danish: Danmarks Statistik) is a Danish governmental organization under the Ministry of Digital Affairs, reporting to the Minister for Digital Affairs. The organization is responsible for creating statistics on the Danish society, including employment statistics, trade balance, and demographics.

Statistics Denmark relies heavily on public registers for statistical production, with a particular emphasis on the Central Person Register for population statistics.

Statistics Denmark's electronic data bank (Statbank.dk) is available freely in Danish or English to any user. It contains nearly all in-house produced statistics, which can be presented as cross-tables, diagrams, or maps, and can be exported to other programs for further analysis. When new general statistics are published in News from Statistics Denmark, the same data is simultaneously released in a more detailed format through the data bank.

== History ==
The first population census in Denmark was conducted in 1769. Statistics Denmark was founded in January 1850, following the introduction of democracy to Denmark, under the name "Statistical Bureau."

In 1966, the Danish Parliament adopted the Act on Statistics Denmark. This act changed the name of the Statistical Bureau to Statistics Denmark and granted an independent Board of Directors the responsibility to determine the institution's work program. This allowed Statistics Denmark to operate independently from government control.

The Act also provides grants Statistics Denmark with access to the basic data necessary for it to produce its statistics. Under the Act, public authorities are required to supply the information they possess when it is requested by Statistics Denmark. The private sector is also obligated to provide certain information.

Since 1970, censuses have been exclusively based on administrative registers, with private citizens only participating in surveys on a voluntary basis only. In line with these principles, Statistics Denmark has focused to develop a data collection system primary relent on the administrative registers of other public offices. Other collection methods are employed when necessary but are considered as supplementary.

== Role of Statistics Denmark ==
The production of statistics in Denmark is highly centralized, with Statistics Denmark as at its center. Therefore, the organization responsible for providing reliable data to the citizenry, politicians, the business community, public agencies, news media, educational institutions, researchers, and the EU.

The overall mission of the institution is stated in its Strategy 2005 paper as follows:

"Our mission is to produce and disseminate all trustworthy statistics on social and economic trends in society, which are an essential condition for its democracy and economy to work."

Statistics Denmark also offers "customized solutions" for purchase. These are tailor-made statistical reports focusing on a specific region and/or form of activity not included in the organization's standard products.

== International Cooperation ==
Statistics Denmark actively participates in international statistical activities, including its involvement in the joint European statistical program.

As a member of the EU, Denmark participates in a binding agreement regarding the compilation, preparation, and dissemination of statistics. While the requirements for statistical output align, to some extent, with Denmark's national needs, significant resources are devoted to fulfilling of Danish obligations.

Statistics Denmark is also actively engaged in international organizations such as the United Nations Statistical Commission, the Conference of European Statisticians (CES), the Organization for Economic Cooperation and Development, the International Monetary Fund, and the International Labour Organization.

== Consulting abroad ==
Statistics Denmark has an International Consulting division that offers assistance to sister agencies in various countries outside the EU. This division aims to help these organizations improve their capacity to produce reliable, useful, and accessible national statistics.
