= Minister for Digital Government (Denmark) =

Danish cabinet position

- Digitaliseringsminister (Danish)
- State coat of arms of the Kingdom of Denmark

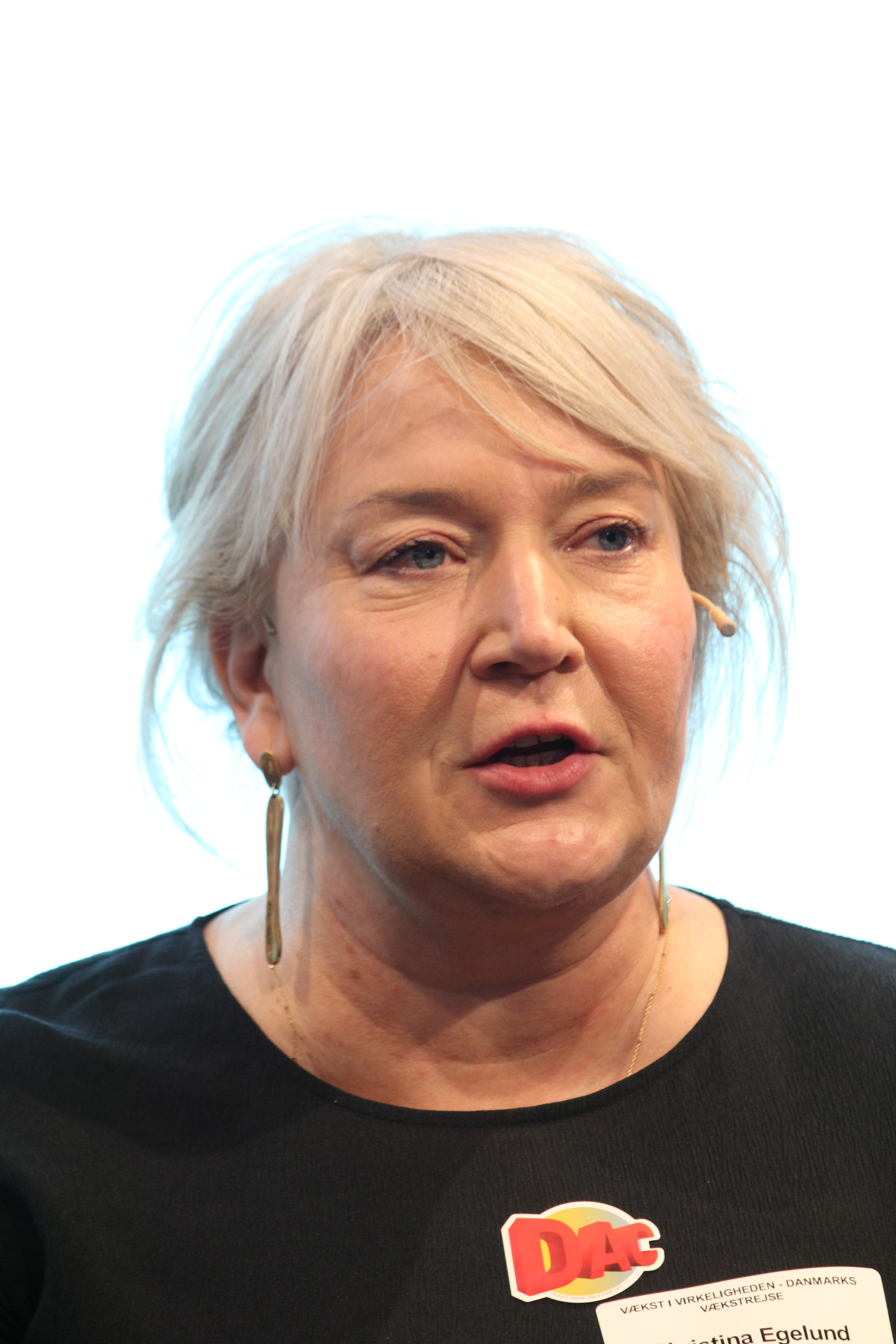
- Incumbent; Christina Egelund since 3 June 2026
- Ministry for Digital Affairs
- Type: Minister
- Member of: Cabinet; State Council
- Reports to: the prime minister
- Seat: Slotsholmen
- Appointer: The Monarch (on the advice of the prime minister)
- Formation: 15 December 2022; 3 years ago
- First holder: Marie Bjerre
- Succession: depending on the order in the State Council
- Deputy: Permanent Secretary
- Salary: 1.624.503,02 DKK (€217,931), in 2026
- Website: Official website

The Minister for Digital Government (Danish: Digitaliseringsminister) is a Danish minister that works on improving digitalization in Denmark. The first minister for digital government was appointed on 15 December 2022.

== List of ministers ==
No.	Portrait	Name (born-died)	Term of office			Political party	Government	Ref.
No.	Portrait	Name (born-died)	Took office	Left office	Time in office	Political party	Government	Ref.
1		Marie Bjerre (born 1986)	15 December 2022	23 November 2023	343 days	Venstre	Frederiksen II	
2		Mia Wagner (born 1977)	23 November 2023	7 December 2023	14 days	Venstre	Frederiksen II	
(1)		Marie Bjerre (born 1986)	7 December 2023	29 August 2024	266 days	Venstre	Frederiksen II	
3		Caroline Stage Olsen (born 1990)	29 August 2024	3 June 2026	1 year, 278 days	Moderates	Frederiksen II	
Minister of Science, Higher Education, and Digitalization (Forsknings-, uddannelses- og digitaliseringsminister)
4		Christina Egelund (born 1977)	3 June 2026	Incumbent	96 days	Moderates	Frederiksen III	
