= Jon Stephensen =

Danish politician (born 1959)

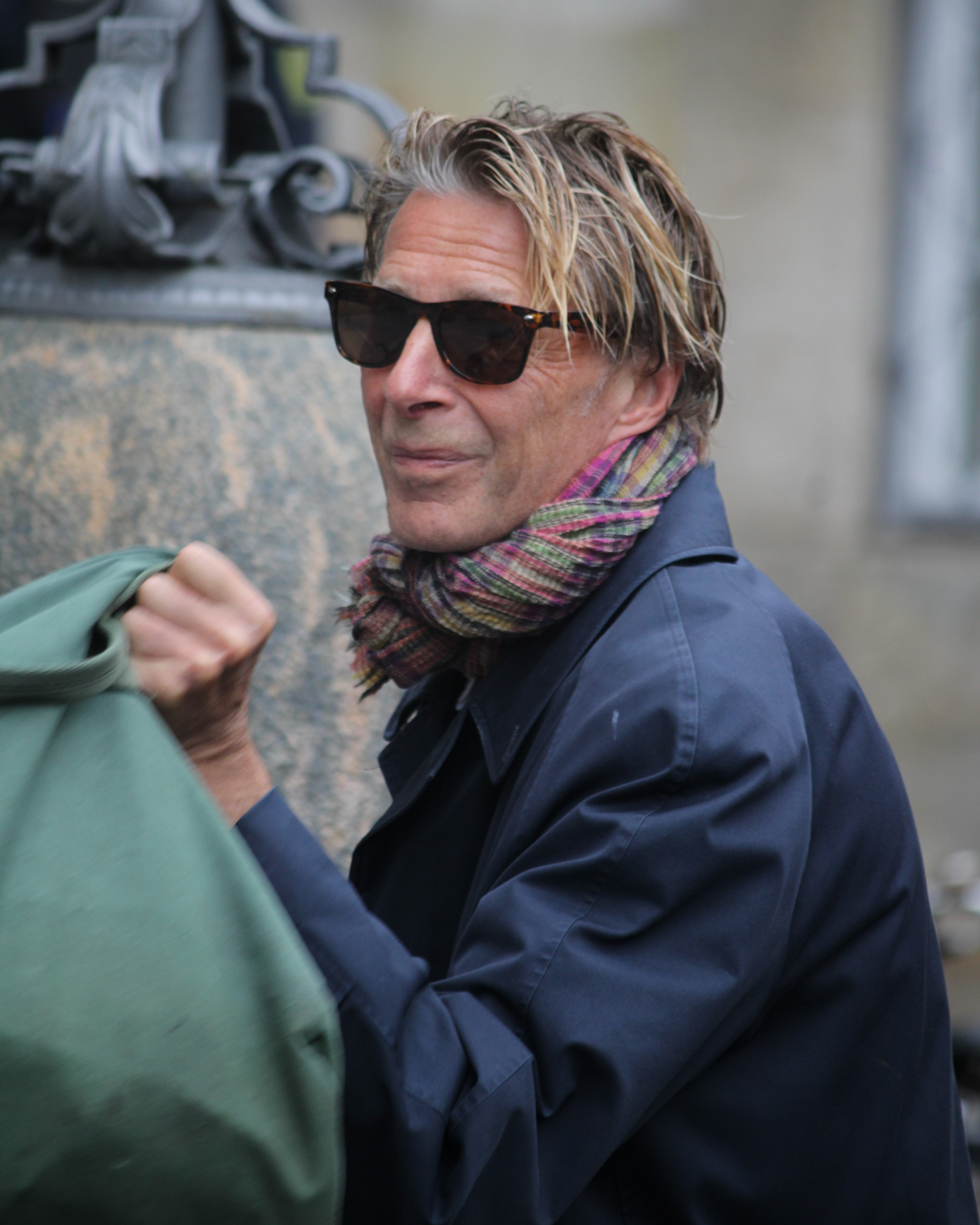
- Stephensen in 2025

Member of the Folketing
- In office 1 November 2022 – 24 March 2026
- Constituency: Greater Copenhagen

Personal details
- Born: 24 December 1959 (age 66) Copenhagen, Denmark
- Party: Independent
- Other political affiliations: Moderates (until 2023)
- Relations: Hakon Stephensen (grandfather)

Jon Stephensen (born 24 December 1959) is a Danish architect, journalist, former theatre director, scenographer and politician and former Member of the Folketing for Greater Copenhagen. Alongside sixteen other members of The Moderates, Stephensen was elected to the Folketing in November 2022. He was his party's spokesperson on culture and foreign affairs before he left the Moderates in August 2023 over alleged signature forging and workplace toxicity.

== See also ==
- List of members of the Folketing, 2022–present
