= Caroline Stage Olsen =

Danish politician (born 1990)

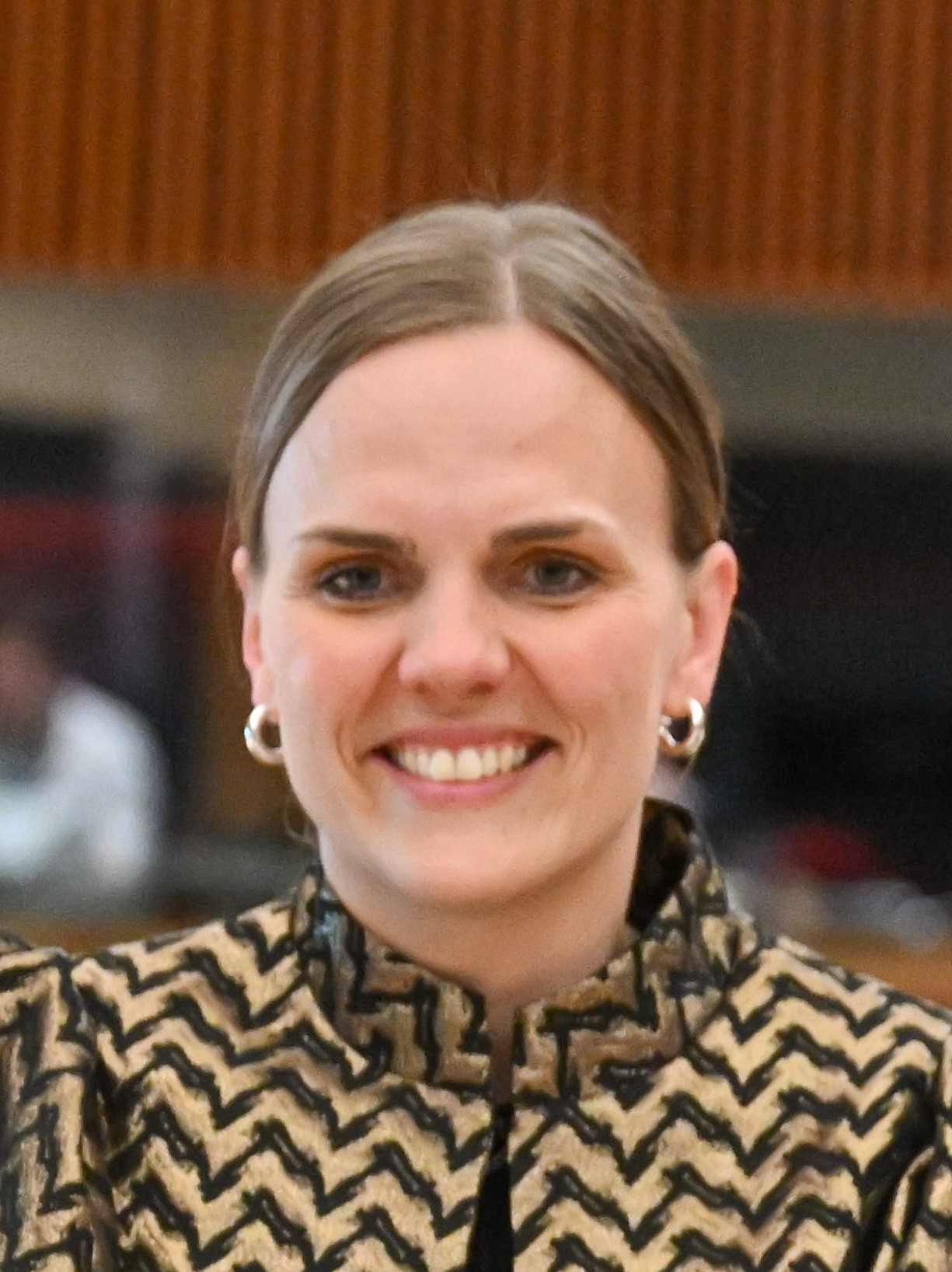
- Stage Olsen in 2025

Minister for Digitalization
- In office 29 August 2024 – 3 June 2026
- Prime Minister: Mette Frederiksen
- Preceded by: Marie Bjerre
- Succeeded by: Christina Egelund

Member of the Folketing
- Incumbent
- Assumed office 24 March 2026
- Constituency: East Jutland

Personal details
- Born: 10 November 1990 (age 35)
- Party: Moderates

Caroline Stage Olsen (born 10 November 1990) is a Danish politician of the Moderates serving as minister for digitalization since 2024 and a member of the Folketing since 2026. She previously worked in government affairs at British American Tobacco from 2016 to 2023 and held board positions at The Danish Tobacco Manufacturers. She was a member of the Copenhagen City Council from 2014 to 2020, representing Venstre. She worked as special advisor to minister of foreign affairs Lars Løkke Rasmussen from July 2024 until her appointment as minister in August 2024. She was elected as a member of the Folketing in March 2026.

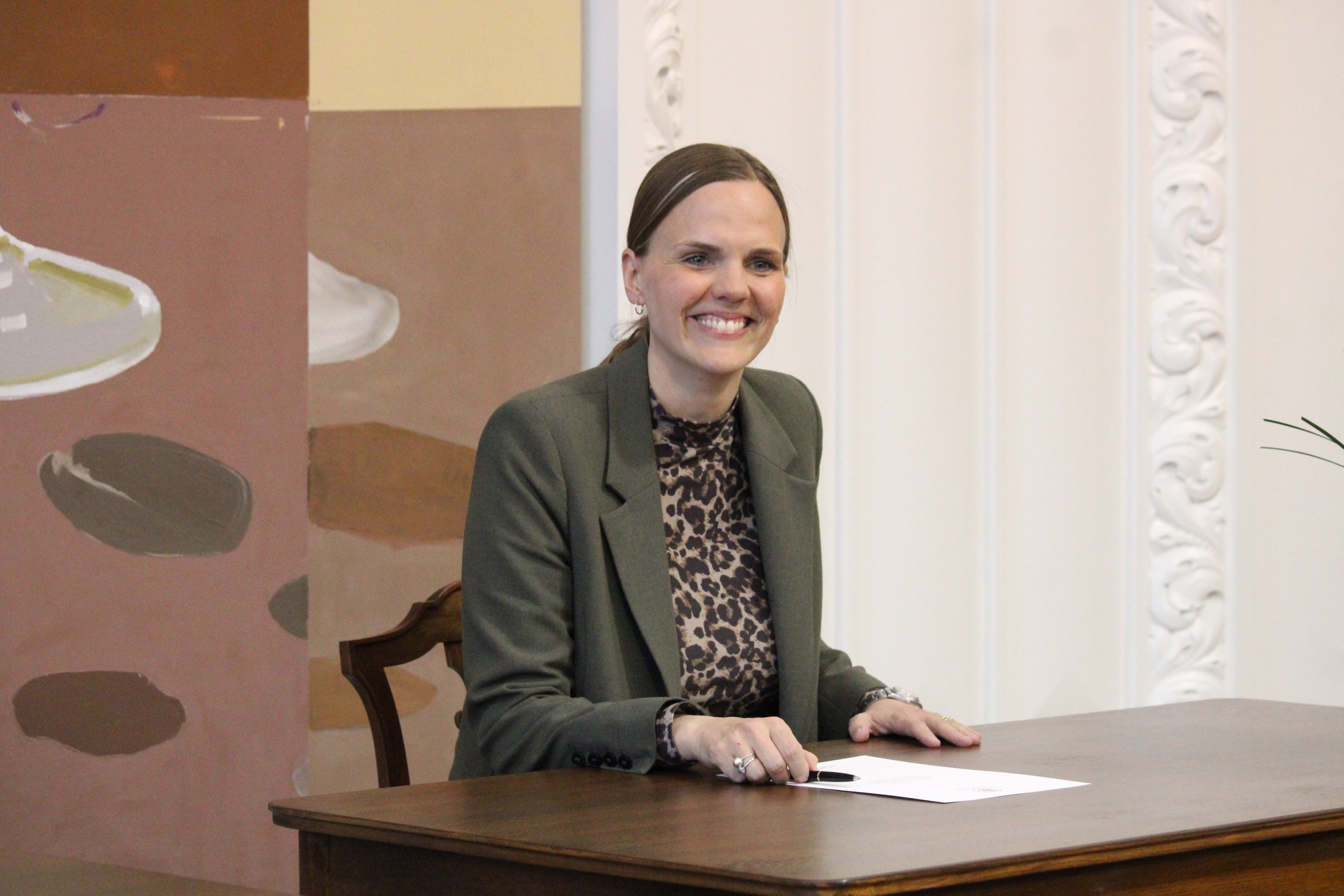
Stage Olsen signing a pledge to uphold the Danish Constitution at Christiansborg, 14 April 2026
