= Jacob Jensen (politician) =

Danish politician

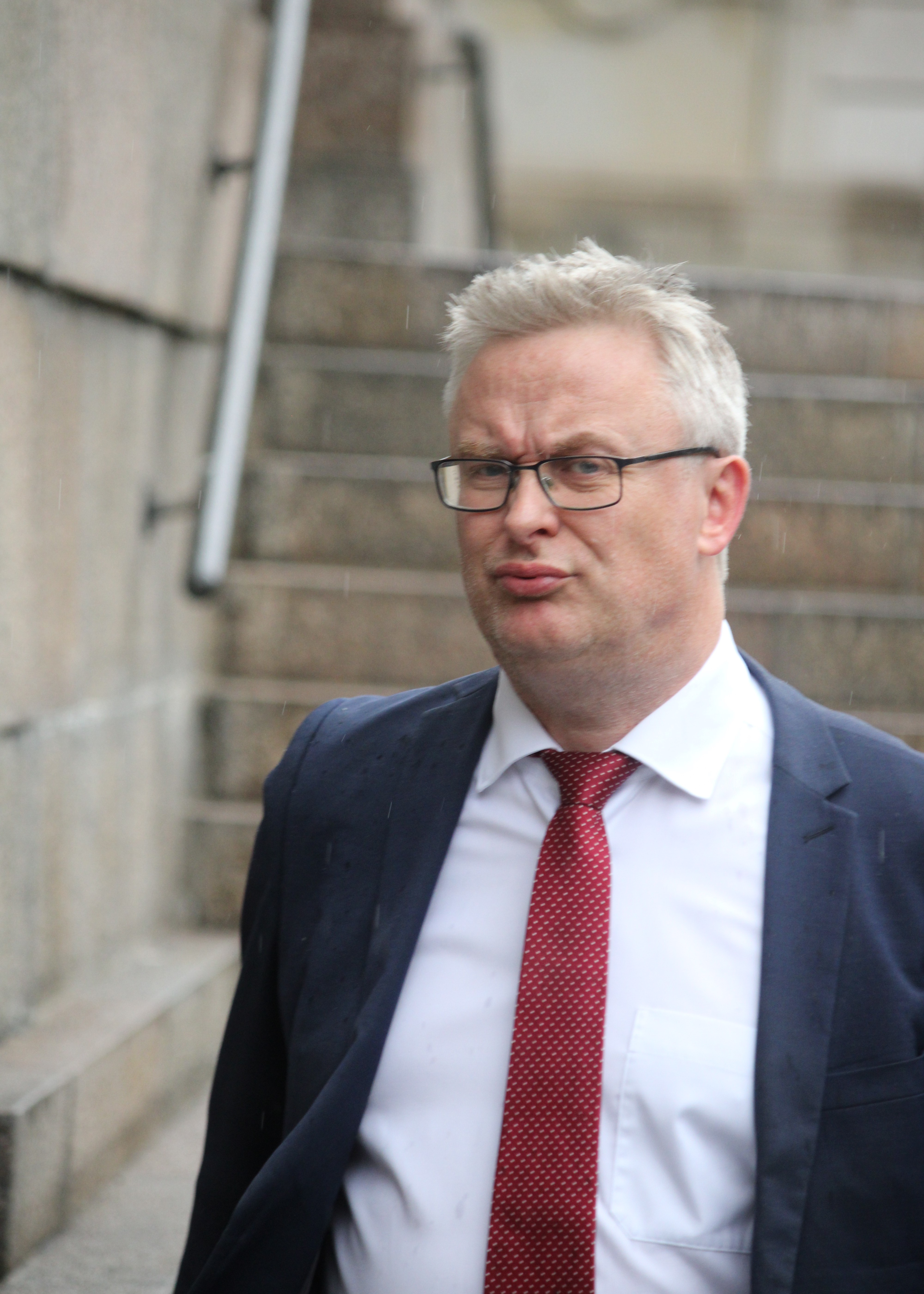
- Jensen in 2025

Member of the Folketing
- Incumbent
- Assumed office 8 February 2005
- Constituency: Zealand (from 2007); Vestsjælland (2005-2007)

Personal details
- Born: 26 May 1973 (age 52) Holbæk, Denmark
- Party: Venstre

Jacob Jensen (born 26 May 1973) is a Danish politician, who is a member of the Folketing for the Venstre political party. He was elected into parliament at the 2005 Danish general election.

== Political career ==
Jensen was elected into parliament in the 2005 election, and reelected in the 2007, 2011, 2015 and 2019 elections.

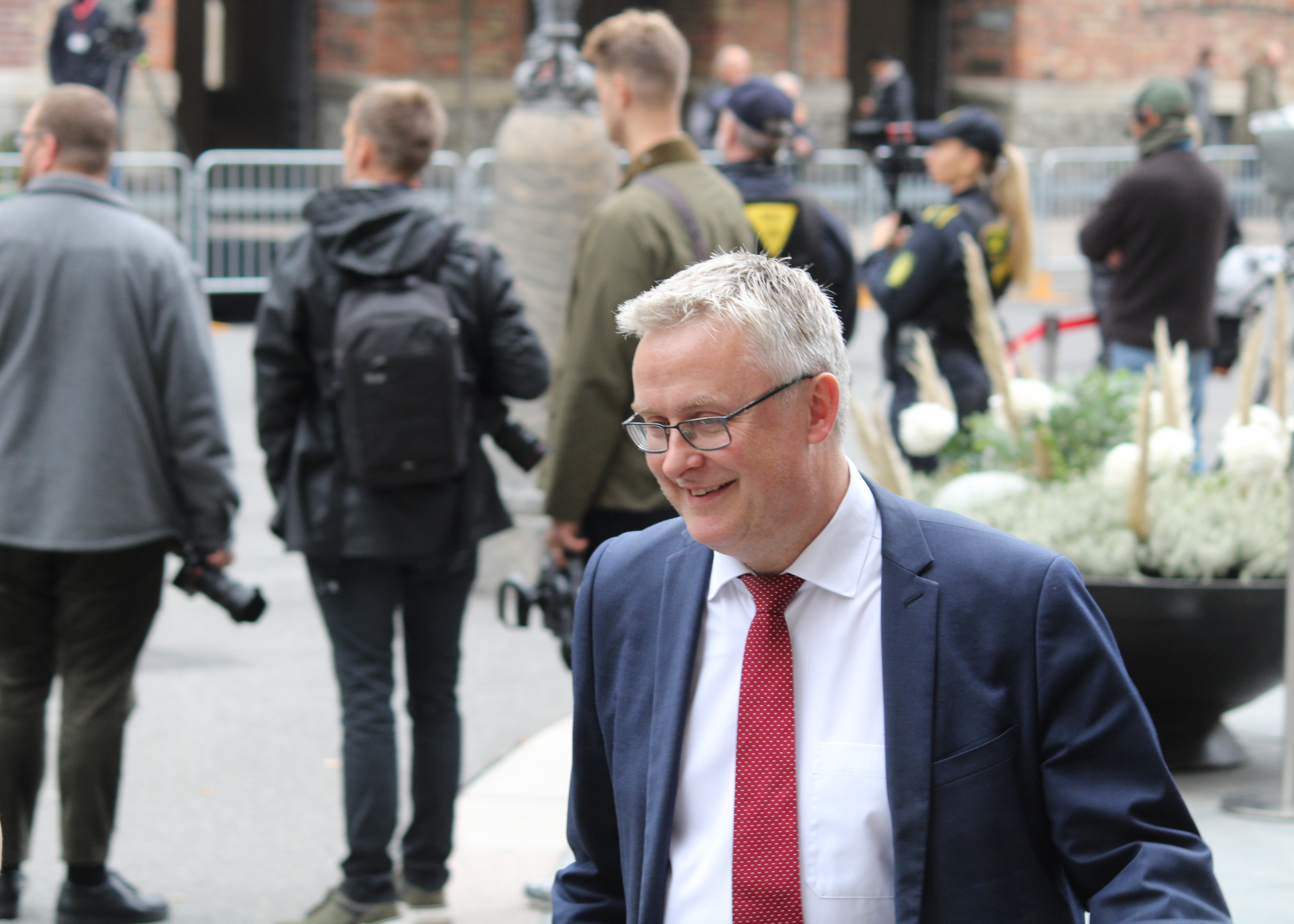
Jensen at the 2025 opening of the Danish parliament

Jensen was appointed Minister for Food, Agriculture and Fisheries in the Frederiksen II Cabinet on 15 December 2022. In October 2023, he launched the Danish Action Plan for Plant-Based Foods, which provides public funding for research, development, and promotion of plant-based foods. Jensen has stated that "plant-based foods are the future" and promoted the plan as a step to reduce food-related greenhouse gas emissions.
