= Mette Kierkgaard =

Danish politician (born 1972)

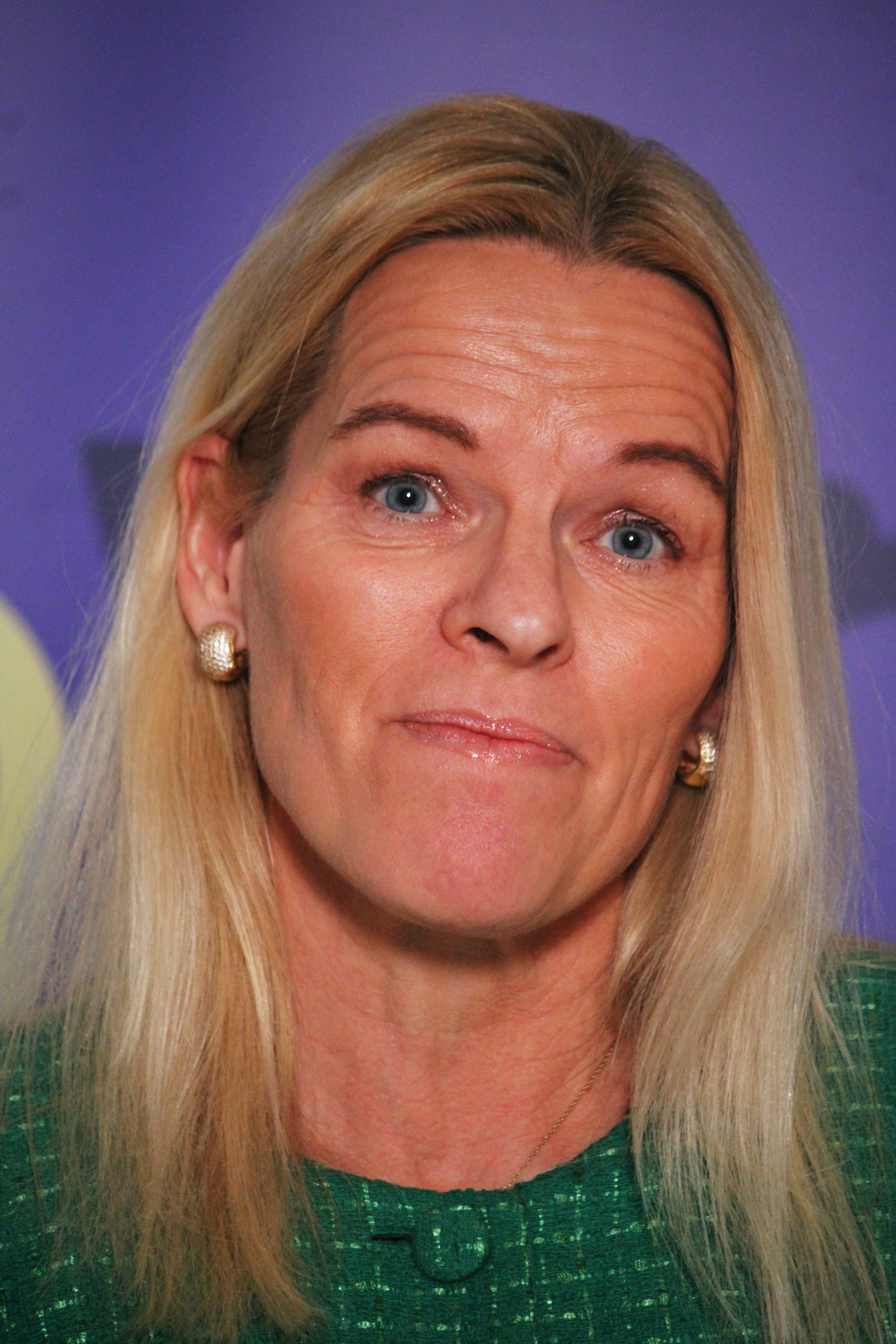
- Kierkgaard in 2026

Minister for the Elderly
- Incumbent
- Assumed office 15 December 2022
- Prime Minister: Mette Frederiksen

Member of the Folketing
- Incumbent
- Assumed office 1 November 2022
- Constituency: South Jutland

Personal details
- Born: 5 March 1972 (age 54) Ribe, Denmark
- Party: Moderates

Mette Kierkgaard (born 5 March 1972) is a Danish politician of the Moderates. She was elected member of the Folketing from the constituency of South Jutland in 2022. She has served as Minister for the Elderly from December 2022.

== Personal life ==
Kierkgaard was born in Ribe to Ove Tobiasen and Kirsten Nordahl. She is married to Thomas Kierkgaard.
