= Mia Wagner =

Danish businesswoman (born 1977)

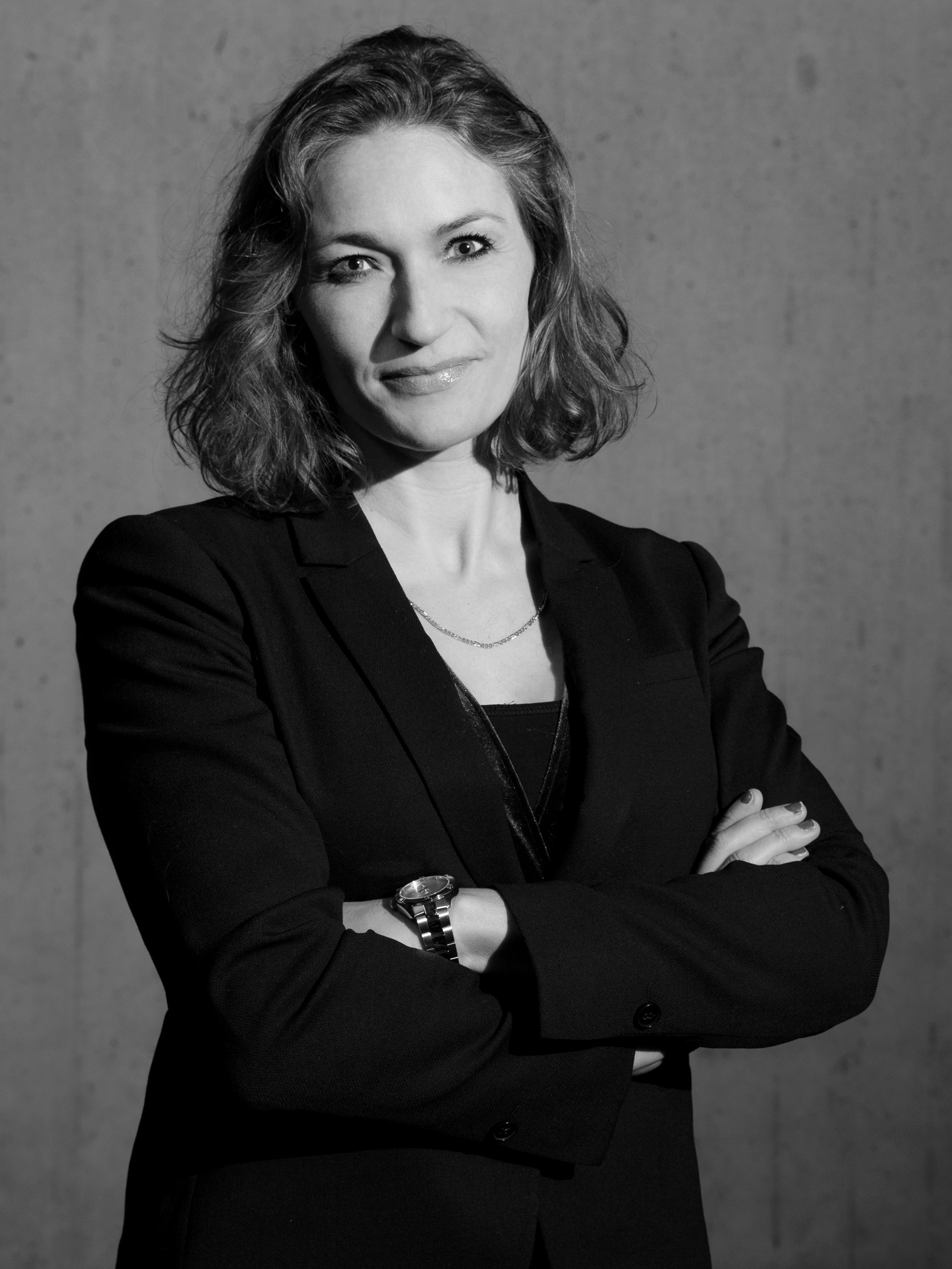
- Wagner in 2019

Minister for Digitalisation and Equality
- In office 23 November 2023 – 7 December 2023
- Prime Minister: Mette Frederiksen
- Preceded by: Marie Bjerre
- Succeeded by: Marie Bjerre

Personal details
- Born: 25 December 1977 (age 48) Viborg, Denmark
- Party: Venstre
- Education: University of Copenhagen

Mia Therese Wagner (born 25 December 1977) is a Danish businesswoman, lawyer and politician. Representing Venstre, she served as Minister for Digitalisation and Equality in the Frederiksen II Cabinet from November to December 2023.

She graduated as a lawyer from the University of Copenhagen in 2003 and subsequently became a lawyer and later a partner with her father in Wagner Advokater. From 2017 to 2020, she was CEO of the Freeway Group. The group is owned by Wagner's father Morten L. Wagner and brother Morten O. Wagner. The latter founded the online dating site dating.dk in 1998, which is still part of the Freeway Group today. In 2020, together with Anne Stampe, she founded the investment platform Nordic Female Founders, which works to create better opportunities for female entrepreneurs and investors. However, she has since disposed of all ownership and ended her collaboration with Stampe.

Wagner became nationally known when she appeared as an investor in the TV series Løvens Hule on DR1 in 2019. In 2023, she also co-hosted DR1's drama documentary Matadorerne. In 2021, she was awarded the Investor of the Year award, Nordic Women in Tech Awards.

== Early and personal life ==
Wagner was born in Viborg to Morten L. Wagner and Charlotte Wagner. Her father, Morten L. Wagner, is a former high-profile defense lawyer who had a number of well-known cases, including the murder of Karl Skomager, Lars Anborg-Nielsen and Pedal-Ove. She has three siblings, including entrepreneur Morten O. Wagner. Mia's brother Morten O. was a parliamentary candidate for the Conservatives in 2001 without being elected.

Wagner went to Overlund School in eastern Viborg. She then took a 2-year HF at Viborg County High School. As a child and teenager, Mia Wagner dreamed of becoming a forensic pathologist and began studying medicine at the University of Odense at the age of 18, but changed her path and trained as a lawyer at the University of Copenhagen. She also has training in conflict management. Privately, she lives in Vedbæk north of Copenhagen and has two daughters from a previous marriage.

== Professional career ==
Wagner started as a paralegal in her father's law firm Wagner Advokater in 2003, and in 2008 she became a partner and director of the company. In 2017, the law firm closed, and Mia Wagner became director of the Freeway Group, of which the Wagner family simultaneously took full ownership. She also holds a number of board positions. In 2020, Wagner in collaboration with Anne Stampe Olesen started the company Nordic Female Founders.

=== Løvens Hule ===
From 2018 to 2022, Wagner as an investor in the TV program Løvens Hule, which is broadcast on DR1. In her first season, which aired in the winter and spring of 2019, she was the only female investor. The other "lions" were Christian Stadil, Jesper Buch, Peter Warnøe and Jan Dal Lehrmann, of which the latter two were debutants.

== Political career ==
=== Minister of Digitalisation and Equality ===
Wagner was appointed Minister for Digitalisation and Equality on 23 November 2023, replacing Marie Bjerre. However, Wagner had to resign after only 2 weeks for health reasons on 7 December 2023 and Bjerre was re-appointed as her successor. Wagner was the second participant of Løvens Hule to be become minister, the first being Tommy Ahlers who was appointed Minister of Higher Education and Science 2018–2019.
