= Christina Egelund =

Danish politician

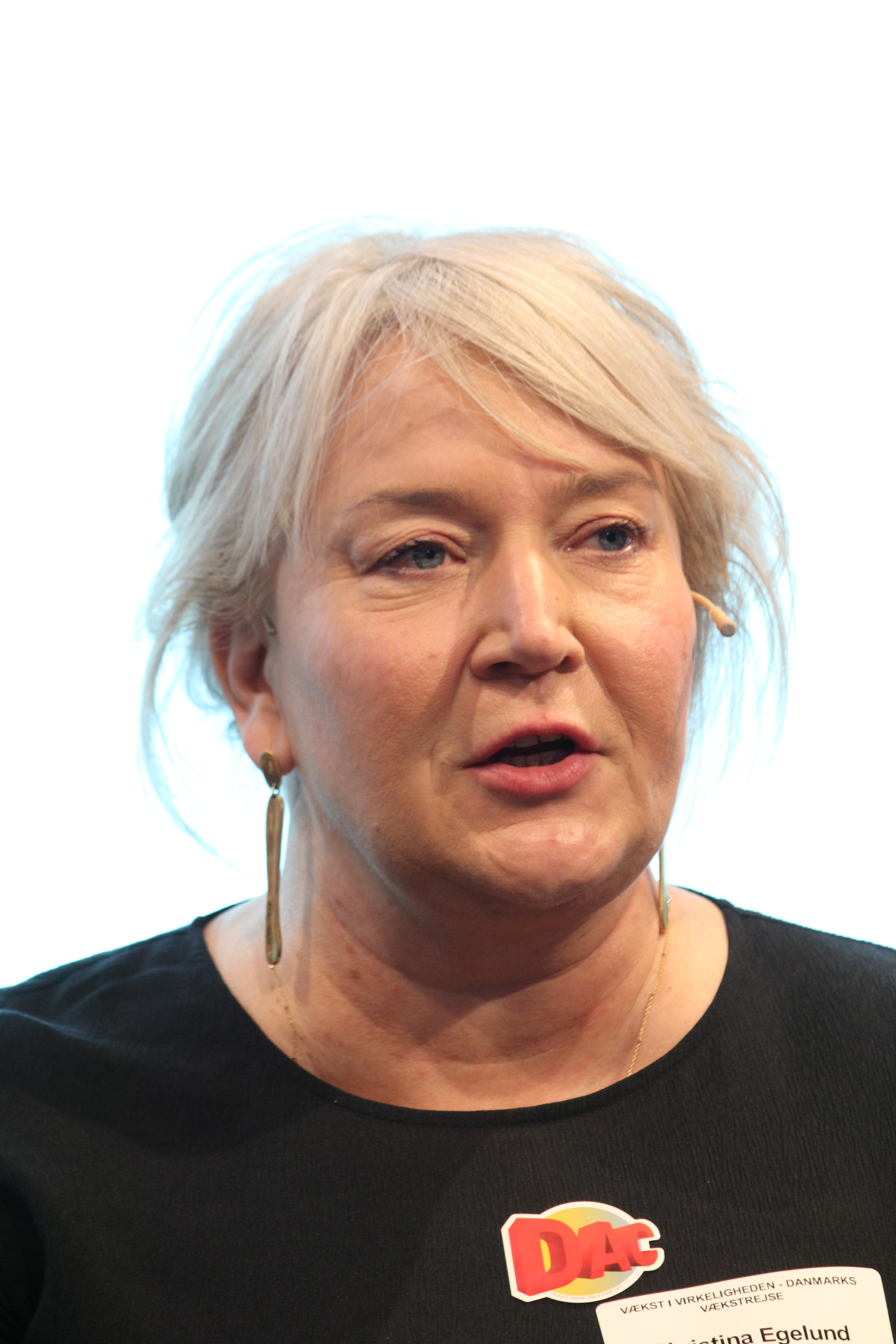
- Egelund in 2025

Minister of Higher Education and Science
- Incumbent
- Assumed office 15 December 2022
- Prime Minister: Mette Frederiksen
- Preceded by: Jesper Petersen

Minister for Digitalization
- Incumbent
- Assumed office 3 June 2026
- Prime Minister: Mette Frederiksen
- Preceded by: Caroline Stage Olsen

Member of the Folketing
- In office 18 June 2015 – 5 June 2019
- Constituency: North Jutland

Personal details
- Born: 9 December 1977 (age 48) Hjørring, Denmark
- Party: Moderates (since 2022)
- Other party: Conservative (1990–2010); Liberal Alliance (2010–2019); Forward (2019–2020)

Christina Egelund (born 9 December 1977) is a Danish politician, who was a member of the Folketing for the Liberal Alliance from 2015 to 2019 and subsequently for the Moderates from 2022

== Political career ==
Egelund was elected into parliament at the 2015 Danish general election, where she received 3,076 votes. In the 2019 election she received 2,026 votes and did not get reelected. She was elected for the Moderates in 2022, and has served as minister for Higher Education and Science since 2022
