= Marie Bjerre =

Danish politician and lawyer

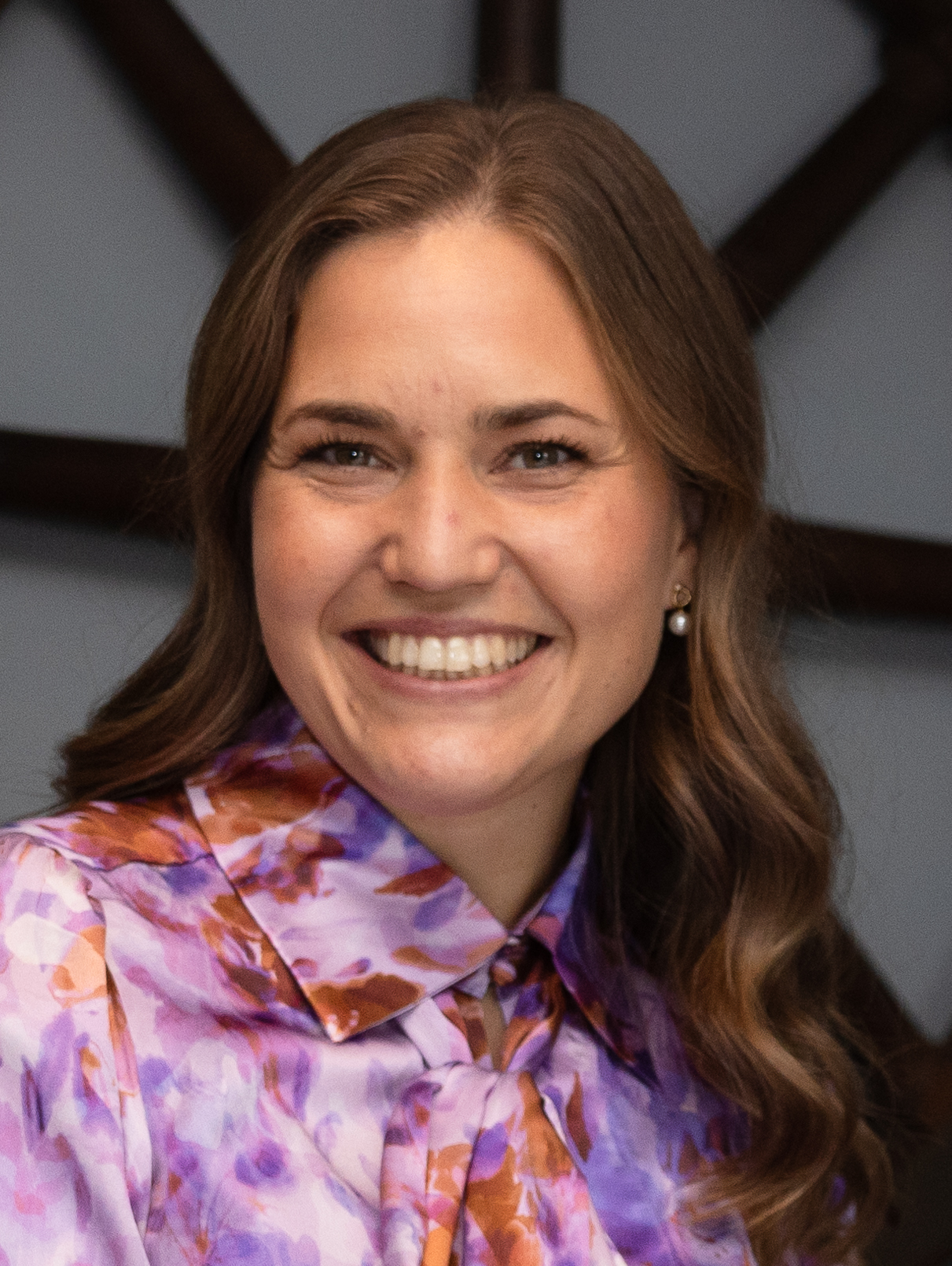
- Bjerre in 2024

Minister of European Affairs
- Incumbent
- Assumed office 29 August 2024
- Prime Minister: Mette Frederiksen
- Preceded by: Position established

Minister of Digitalisation and Equality
- In office 7 December 2023 – 29 August 2024
- Prime Minister: Mette Frederiksen
- Preceded by: Mia Wagner
- Succeeded by: Caroline Stage Olsen
- In office 15 December 2022 – 23 November 2023
- Prime Minister: Mette Frederiksen
- Preceded by: Trine Bramsen (Gender Equality)
- Succeeded by: Mia Wagner

Member of the Folketing
- Incumbent
- Assumed office 5 June 2019
- Constituency: North Jutland

Personal details
- Born: 6 May 1986 (age 39) Viborg, Denmark
- Party: Venstre
- Spouse: Jan Bjerre Holst
- Children: 2

Marie Bjerre (born 6 May 1986) is a Danish politician, who is a member of the Folketing for the Venstre political party. She was elected into the Folketing in the 2019 Danish general election, and re-elected in 2022.

== Political career ==
=== Parliament ===
Bjerre was elected into the Folketing at the 2019 election, receiving 8,627 votes. She was re-elected in 2022.

=== Minister of Digitalisation and Equality ===
On 15 December 2022, she was appointed minister of digitalisation and equality.

On 23 November 2023, she was shuffled out of cabinet in a minor reshuffle and was succeeded by Mia Wagner. However, Wagner resigned after two weeks due to illness, and Bjerre was re-appointed to the position.

=== Minister of European Affairs ===
She was appointed minister of European affairs in a cabinet reshuffle on 29 August 2024.

== Awards ==
- Recipients of the Order of Princess Olga, 2nd class (Ukraine, 2026)
