= Moderates (Denmark) =

Moderates Moderaterne
- Abbreviation: M
- Chairman: Lars Løkke Rasmussen
- Founder: Lars Løkke Rasmussen
- Founded: 5 June 2022
- Split from: Venstre
- Headquarters: Lyskær 8, 2730 Herlev
- Think tank: Det Politiske Mødested
- Youth wing: Unge Moderater^{da}
- Ideology: Liberalism
- Political position: Centre to centre-right
- European affiliation: Alliance of Liberals and Democrats for Europe
- European Parliament group: Renew Europe
- International affiliation: Liberal International
- Nordic affiliation: Centre Group
- Colours: Purple (official); Light purple (customary)
- Folketing: 14 / 179 (Note: Only 175 of the 179 seats in the Danish Parliament, the Folketing, are obtainable by Danish political parties as Greenland and the Faroe Islands are assigned two seats each due to their status as territories in the Kingdom of Denmark.)
- European Parliament: 1 / 15
- Municipal councils: 6 / 2,436
- Regions: 2 / 205

Election symbol
- M

Website
- moderaterne.dk

The Moderates (Danish: Moderaterne [mɔˈdɛʁɑˀtɐnə], M) is a liberal political party in Denmark founded by former prime minister and current minister of foreign affairs Lars Løkke Rasmussen.

== History ==
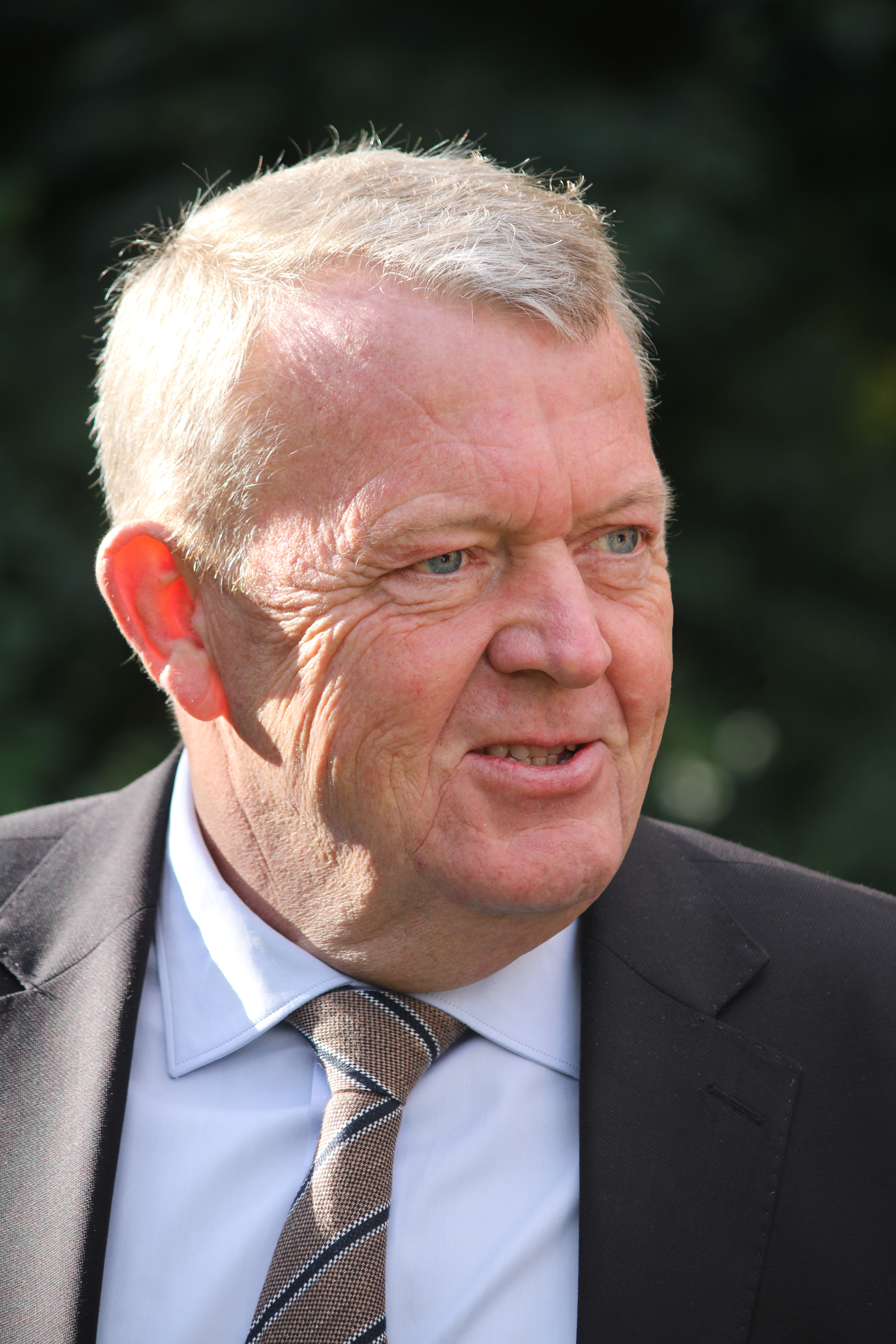
Lars Løkke Rasmussen, founder of the party

Lars Løkke Rasmussen announced his intention to form a new party in a speech on 5 June 2021. At the same time, he said that his main scenario was that the party would be formed after the 2021 Danish local elections.

The party's name was, according to Rasmussen, inspired by the fictitious Prime Minister Birgitte Nyborg's party De moderate in the hit political TV drama Borgen (itself allegedly inspired by the Social Liberal Party) as well as the Swedish Moderate Party, a centre-right party that was at the time the second largest party in the Swedish Riksdag.

The Moderates' political position is referred to as centre to centre-right. According to Rasmussen, the Moderates is a centrist party that has the ambition to create "progress and change in a crossroads between a blue bloc that is tormented by value politics and a red bloc that is stuck in a past view of individual and state". Thus, it is not aligned with either bloc in the Folketing. The party began collecting voting declarations in June 2021. On 15 September 2021 Lars Løkke Rasmussen announced that they had received the 20,182 signatures needed to be eligible to stand in the 2022 Danish general election.

The Moderates saw a surge in popularity during campaigning for the 2022 general election, eventually ending up as the third largest party with 16 seats, as polls had suggested. They had positioned themselves as kingmakers in deciding who the next prime minister should be, but the incumbent red bloc won a majority, thus preventing the Moderates from having the decisive seats in the next government. Despite this, the Moderates entered negotiations with the Social Democrats and Venstre and successfully formed a grand coalition government, the Frederiksen II Cabinet.

In the 2026 general election, the Moderates lost two seats and saw a 16% drop in support. However, with the red bloc falling short of a majority, the Moderates emerged as potential kingmakers.

They are in the coalition Government of the Frederiksen III cabinet, with its leader holding the position of Minister of Foreign Affairs.

Initial party logo

== Election results ==
=== Parliament ===
Election	Leader	Votes	%	Seats	+/-	Government
2022	Lars Løkke Rasmussen	327,699	9.27 (#3)	16 / 179	New	Coalition
2026	Lars Løkke Rasmussen	274,775	7.70 (#6)	14 / 179	▼2	Coalition

=== Local elections ===
Municipal elections

Year	Seats	
Year	No.	±
2025	6 / 2,432	▲6

Regional elections

Year	Seats	
Year	No.	±
2025	1 / 134	▲1

Mayors

Year	Seats	
Year	No.	±
2025	0 / 98	0

=== European Parliament ===
Year	List leader	Votes	%	Seats	+/–	EP Group
2024	Stine Bosse	145,698	5.95 (#10)	1 / 15	New	RE

== See also ==
- Liberalism and radicalism in Denmark
- List of political parties in Denmark
- Netherlands New Social Contract
