= Next Danish general election =

- On or before 23 March 2030
- All 179 seats in the Folketing; 175 from Denmark proper, 2 from Greenland and 2 from the Faroe Islands; 90 seats needed for a majority
| Party | Leader | Current seats |
Parties in Denmark
| Social Democrats | Mette Frederiksen | 38 |
| Green Left | Pia Olsen Dyhr | 20 |
| Venstre | Troels Lund Poulsen | 17 |
| DPP | Morten Messerschmidt | 16 |
| Liberal Alliance | Alex Vanopslagh | 15 |
| Moderates | Lars Løkke Rasmussen | 14 |
| Conservatives | Mona Juul | 13 |
| Red–Green | Pelle Dragsted (Note: Formally, the Red–Green Alliance has collective leadership. See Hoffmann-Hansen, Henrik; Fabricius, Kitte (10 May 2019). "Overblik: Partierne i Danmark". Kristeligt Dagblad (in Danish). Archived from the original on 8 November 2022.) | 11 |
| Social Liberals | Martin Lidegaard | 10 |
| Denmark Democrats | Inger Støjberg | 10 |
| The Alternative | Franciska Rosenkilde | 5 |
| Citizens' Party | Lars Boje Mathiesen | 1 |
Parties in the Faroe Islands
| Social Democratic | Aksel V. Johannesen | 1 |
| Union | Bárður á Steig Nielsen | 1 |
Parties in Greenland
| Inuit Ataqatigiit | Múte Bourup Egede | 1 |
| Naleraq | Pele Broberg | 1 |
| Incumbent Government |
|---|
| Frederiksen III; S–SF–M–RV |

General elections will be held in Denmark on or before 23 March 2030. All 179 seats in the Folketing will be up for election; 175 from Denmark proper, 2 from Greenland, and 2 from the Faroe Islands.

== Background ==
The 2026 election saw the incumbent government, led by Prime Minister Mette Frederiksen, and consisting of the Social Democrats, Venstre, and the Moderates, lose its parliamentary majority. All three government parties saw a decline in its number of seats won. On the other hand, the Green Left, Liberal Alliance, and the Danish People's Party each saw gains compared to the previous election. All parties with parliamentary ballot access managed to clear the electoral threshold, including Citizens' Party, which won representation after having been founded in the previous parliamentary term. The election resulted in none of the political blocs winning a majority of seats, with the Moderates instead having the decisive seats.

== Electoral system ==
The 179 members of the Folketing are elected in Denmark (175), the Faroe Islands (2), and Greenland (2). The 175 seats in Denmark include 135 seats elected in ten multi-member constituencies of Denmark by proportional representation, using the d'Hondt method (kredsmandater), and 40 leveling seats, allocated to parties in order to address any imbalance in the distribution of the constituency seats (tillægsmandater). The main threshold for levelling seats is 2% of votes.

== Opinion polls ==
The table below shows opinion polls conducted since the 2026 election, in reverse chronological order, with parties ordered alphabetically by their party letter. The leading party in each poll has its cell shaded in the party's colour. The total level of support for the red and blue blocs is also shown. The level of support for parties or candidates without ballot access is labelled under the "others" column. Where this figure is not provided by the pollster, it is calculated as the difference between 100% and the share of votes received by political parties with ballot access. Projected seat totals, as reported by the pollster are shown below the corresponding vote shares.

=== Nationwide polls ===
A: Social Democrats
B: Social Liberal Party
C: Conservative People's Party
F: Green Left
H: Citizens' Party
I: Liberal Alliance
M: Moderates
O: Danish People's Party
V: Venstre
Æ: Denmark Democrats
Ø: Red-Green Alliance
Å: The Alternative
Red bloc
Blue bloc

| Polling execution | | | Parties | | | | | | | | | | | | | Blocs | | | | |
| Polling firm | Fieldwork date | Sample size | Social Democrats (Denmark) | Danish Social Liberal Party | Conservative People's Party (Denmark) | Green Left (Denmark) | Citizens' Party (Denmark) | Liberal Alliance (Denmark) | Moderates (Denmark) | Danish People's Party | Venstre (Denmark) | Denmark Democrats | Red–Green Alliance (Denmark) | The Alternative (Denmark) | Others | Gov. | Sup. | Opp. | Red | Blue |
|---|---|---|---|---|---|---|---|---|---|---|---|---|---|---|---|---|---|---|---|---|
| Voxmeter | 9–15 Nov 2026 | 1,000 | 19.7; 35 | 6.4; 11 | 10.3; 18 | 9.7; 17 | 0.3; 0 | 8.7; 15 | 5.8; 10 | 14.3; 25 | 7.0; 13 | 6.2; 11 | 8.4; 15 | 3.0; 5 | 0.2; 0 | 41.6; 73 | 11.4; 20 | 46.8; 82 | 47.2; 83 | 46.8; 82 |
| Verian | 5–11 Nov 2026 | 1,014 | 20.6; 36 | 6.0; 11 | 10.2; 18 | 10.4; 18 | 0.9; 0 | 7.9; 14 | 7.4; 13 | 11.7; 21 | 6.7; 12 | 7.1; 13 | 8.0; 14 | 2.7; 5 | 0.4; 0 | 44.4; 78 | 10.7; 19 | 44.5; 78 | 47.7; 84 | 44.5; 78 |
| Voxmeter | 2–8 Nov 2026 | 1,014 | 19.9; 35 | 6.4; 11 | 10.7; 19 | 10.7; 19 | 0.4; 0 | 9.2; 16 | 5.6; 10 | 13.4; 23 | 5.8; 10 | 6.1; 11 | 8.9; 16 | 2.8; 5 | 0.1; 0 | 42.6; 75 | 11.7; 21 | 45.6; 79 | 48.7; 86 | 45.6; 79 |
| Voxmeter | 26 Oct–2 Nov 2026 | 1,007 | 20.8; 37 | 6.0; 11 | 9.8; 17 | 9.4; 17 | 0.9; 0 | 10.2; 18 | 5.0; 9 | 13.3; 24 | 6.5; 11 | 7.0; 12 | 8.5; 15 | 2.4; 4 | 0.2; 0 | 41.2; 74 | 10.9; 19 | 47.7; 82 | 47.1; 84 | 47.7; 82 |
| Voxmeter | 19–25 Oct 2026 | 1,019 | 20.6; 37 | 6.0; 11 | 9.2; 16 | 10.2; 18 | 0.9; 0 | 9.7; 17 | 5.6; 10 | 14.8; 26 | 6.5; 12 | 6.4; 11 | 7.6; 13 | 2.3; 4 | 0.2; 0 | 42.4; 76 | 9.9; 17 | 47.5; 82 | 46.7; 83 | 47.5; 82 |
| Megafon | 20–22 Oct 2026 | 2,024 | 20.4; 37 | 6.4; 11 | 10.0; 18 | 9.1; 16 | 0.3; 0 | 11.3; 20 | 6.0; 11 | 14.8; 26 | 6.0; 11 | 5.2; 9 | 9.0; 16 | 1.4; 0 | 0.1; 0 | 41.9; 74 | 10.4; 16 | 47.6; 85 | 46.3; 79 | 47.6; 85 |
| Voxmeter | 12–18 Oct 2026 | 1,011 | 20.7; 36 | 6.0; 11 | 8.7; 15 | 11.2; 20 | 0.4; 0 | 11.0; 19 | 6.8; 12 | 11.7; 21 | 6.8; 12 | 5.8; 10 | 8.7; 15 | 2.1; 4 | 0.1; 0 | 44.7; 79 | 10.8; 19 | 44.4; 77 | 48.7; 86 | 44.4; 77 |
| Voxmeter | 5–11 Oct 2026 | 1,009 | 20.4; 36 | 6.4; 11 | 9.8; 17 | 11.0; 20 | 0.7; 0 | 9.5; 17 | 5.6; 10 | 12.8; 23 | 7.4; 13 | 5.4; 10 | 8.1; 14 | 2.4; 4 | 0.5; 0 | 43.4; 77 | 10.5; 18 | 45.6; 80 | 48.3; 85 | 45.6; 80 |
| Epinion | 29 Sep–6 Oct 2026 | 2,051 | 21.5; 38 | 5.7; 10 | 10.2; 18 | 10.5; 19 | 0.8; 0 | 9.7; 17 | 5.8; 10 | 12.7; 23 | 5.8; 10 | 7.2; 13 | 7.3; 13 | 2.2; 4 | 0.6; 0 | 43.5; 77 | 9.5; 17 | 46.4; 81 | 47.2; 84 | 46.4; 81 |
| Voxmeter | 28 Sep–4 Oct 2026 | 1,007 | 21.0; 38 | 6.1; 11 | 9.2; 16 | 11.6; 21 | 0.2; 0 | 10.8; 19 | 5.8; 10 | 13.9; 25 | 5.9; 11 | 5.8; 10 | 7.9; 14 | 1.8; 0 | 0.0; 0 | 44.5; 80 | 9.7; 14 | 45.8; 81 | 48.4; 84 | 45.8; 81 |
| Verian | 23–29 Sep 2026 | 1,704 | 20.9; 38 | 6.2; 11 | 9.3; 17 | 10.3; 18 | 0.7; 0 | 9.4; 17 | 6.0; 11 | 13.4; 24 | 7.8; 14 | 6.6; 12 | 7.4; 13 | 1.8; 0 | 0.2; 0 | 43.4; 78 | 9.2; 13 | 47.2; 84 | 46.6; 80 | 47.2; 84 |
| Voxmeter | 21–27 Sep 2026 | 1,008 | 20.4; 36 | 5.3; 9 | 9.7; 17 | 11.5; 20 | 0.4; 0 | 10.5; 18 | 6.6; 12 | 12.5; 22 | 6.6; 12 | 6.9; 12 | 7.5; 13 | 2.1; 4 | 0.0; 0 | 43.8; 77 | 9.6; 17 | 46.6; 81 | 46.8; 82 | 46.6; 81 |
| Voxmeter | 14–20 Sep 2026 | 1,003 | 20.7; 36 | 5.5; 10 | 9.1; 16 | 10.8; 19 | 0.7; 0 | 10.8; 19 | 6.7; 12 | 14.1; 25 | 5.8; 10 | 6.5; 11 | 7.1; 13 | 2.2; 4 | 0.0; 0 | 43.7; 77 | 9.3; 17 | 47.0; 81 | 46.3; 82 | 47.0; 81 |
| Epinion | 9–15 Sep 2026 | 2,058 | 20.5; 36 | 6.1; 11 | 8.4; 15 | 10.4; 18 | 0.5; 0 | 9.7; 17 | 5.6; 10 | 14.3; 25 | 7.1; 13 | 7.2; 13 | 7.4; 13 | 2.2; 4 | 0.6; 0 | 42.6; 75 | 9.6; 17 | 47.2; 83 | 46.6; 82 | 47.2; 83 |
| Voxmeter | 7–13 Sep 2026 | 1,008 | 19.7; 35 | 6.4; 11 | 9.9; 17 | 10.7; 19 | 0.7; 0 | 9.6; 17 | 6.6; 12 | 12.6; 22 | 7.0; 12 | 6.3; 11 | 7.7; 14 | 2.7; 5 | 0.1; 0 | 43.4; 77 | 10.4; 19 | 46.1; 79 | 47.2; 84 | 46.1; 79 |
| Megafon | 7–10 Sep 2026 | 1,017 | 19.3; 34 | 6.7; 12 | 10.6; 19 | 9.5; 17 | 0.6; 0 | 9.9; 18 | 5.9; 10 | 13.7; 24 | 6.4; 11 | 7.5; 13 | 7.6; 13 | 2.2; 4 | 0.1; 0 | 41.4; 73 | 9.8; 17 | 48.7; 85 | 45.3; 80 | 48.7; 85 |
| Voxmeter | 31 Aug–6 Sep 2026 | 1,010 | 21.7; 38 | 7.5; 13 | 9.0; 16 | 10.4; 18 | 0.6; 0 | 10.2; 18 | 5.4; 10 | 12.3; 22 | 7.1; 13 | 5.6; 10 | 7.5; 13 | 2.5; 4 | 0.2; 0 | 45.0; 79 | 10.0; 17 | 44.8; 79 | 49.6; 86 | 44.8; 79 |
| Voxmeter | 24–30 Aug 2026 | 1,008 | 20.7; 37 | 7.4; 13 | 8.8; 16 | 10.5; 19 | 1.4; 0 | 8.8; 16 | 6.3; 11 | 13.0; 23 | 8.7; 15 | 5.2; 9 | 7.1; 12 | 2.0; 4 | 0.1; 0 | 44.9; 80 | 9.1; 16 | 45.9; 79 | 47.7; 85 | 45.9; 79 |
| Voxmeter | 17–23 Aug 2026 | 1,007 | 20.9; 37 | 6.4; 11 | 8.1; 14 | 10.7; 19 | 0.9; 0 | 9.8; 17 | 5.9; 11 | 12.1; 21 | 9.3; 17 | 5.0; 9 | 8.2; 15 | 2.5; 4 | 0.2; 0 | 43.9; 78 | 10.7; 19 | 45.2; 78 | 48.7; 86 | 45.2; 78 |
| Voxmeter | 10–16 Aug 2026 | 1,009 | 21.6; 38 | 5.5; 10 | 7.8; 14 | 12.0; 21 | 0.9; 0 | 8.7; 15 | 6.5; 11 | 12.5; 22 | 9.7; 17 | 5.4; 10 | 7.1; 13 | 2.1; 4 | 0.2; 0 | 45.6; 80 | 9.2; 17 | 45.0; 78 | 48.3; 86 | 45.0; 78 |
| Epinion | 5–12 Aug 2026 | 2,037 | 20.6; 36 | 6.0; 11 | 8.0; 14 | 12.1; 21 | 0.7; 0 | 9.2; 16 | 6.0; 11 | 12.2; 22 | 9.3; 17 | 5.9; 10 | 7.3; 13 | 2.3; 4 | 0.4; 0 | 44.7; 79 | 9.6; 17 | 44.6; 79 | 48.3; 85 | 45.3; 79 |
| Voxmeter | 3–9 Aug 2026 | 1,029 | 21.1; 37 | 5.3; 9 | 8.2; 15 | 11.0; 19 | 0.6; 0 | 9.6; 17 | 5.7; 10 | 12.4; 22 | 10.3; 18 | 6.0; 11 | 7.3; 12 | 2.4; 5 | 0.1; 0 | 43.1; 75 | 9.7; 17 | 47.1; 83 | 47.1; 82 | 47.1; 83 |
| Voxmeter | 22–28 Jun 2026 | 1,003 | 21.4; 38 | 6.4; 11 | 8.5; 15 | 10.8; 19 | 0.9; 0 | 9.2; 16 | 6.9; 12 | 11.1; 20 | 9.9; 17 | 5.0; 9 | 7.1; 13 | 2.6; 5 | 0.2; 0 | 45.5; 80 | 9.7; 18 | 44.6; 77 | 48.3; 86 | 44.6; 77 |
| Voxmeter | 15–21 Jun 2026 | 1,006 | 21.1; 37 | 7.0; 12 | 7.3; 13 | 9.8; 17 | 0.8; 0 | 10.1; 18 | 6.5; 11 | 11.7; 21 | 11.2; 20 | 4.5; 8 | 7.7; 14 | 2.3; 4 | 0.0; 0 | 44.4; 77 | 10.0; 18 | 45.6; 80 | 47.9; 84 | 45.6; 80 |
| Voxmeter | 7–14 Jun 2026 | 1,061 | 19.8; 35 | 6.2; 11 | 8.3; 15 | 11.9; 21 | 0.7; 0 | 9.7; 17 | 6.5; 11 | 11.2; 20 | 10.4; 18 | 5.1; 9 | 7.9; 14 | 2.2; 4 | 0.1; 0 | 44.4; 78 | 10.1; 18 | 45.4; 79 | 48.0; 85 | 45.4; 79 |
| Voxmeter | 1–7 Jun 2026 | 1,007 | 20.7; 37 | 5.1; 9 | 9.0; 16 | 12.2; 22 | 0.8; 0 | 10.9; 19 | 6.8; 12 | 10.7; 19 | 8.9; 16 | 5.2; 9 | 7.1; 12 | 2.5; 4 | 0.1; 0 | 44.8; 80 | 9.6; 16 | 45.5; 79 | 47.6; 84 | 45.5; 79 |
| Verian | 27 May–1 Jun 2026 | 1,494 | 20.9; 37 | 5.6; 10 | 8.3; 15 | 13.1; 23 | 0.6; 0 | 9.2; 16 | 6.0; 10 | 12.0; 21 | 10.2; 18 | 5.1; 9 | 7.0; 12 | 2.2; 4 | 0.0; 0 | 45.6; 80 | 9.2; 16 | 45.7; 79 | 48.8; 86 | 45.2; 79 |
| Epinion | 26 May–1 Jun 2026 | 2,073 | 21.2; 37 | 6.0; 11 | 7.5; 13 | 13.2; 23 | 0.4; 0 | 9.1; 16 | 6.4; 11 | 11.6; 21 | 9.5; 17 | 4.9; 9 | 7.4; 13 | 2.3; 4 | 0.5; 0 | 46.9; 82 | 9.7; 17 | 43.0; 76 | 50.1; 88 | 43.0; 76 |
| Voxmeter | 25–31 May 2026 | 1,003 | 21.9; 39 | 5.4; 10 | 7.7; 14 | 12.3; 22 | 0.6; 0 | 10.4; 18 | 7.4; 13 | 10.5; 18 | 9.2; 16 | 5.3; 9 | 6.8; 12 | 2.5; 4 | 0.0; 0 | 47.0; 84 | 9.3; 16 | 43.7; 75 | 48.9; 87 | 43.7; 75 |
| Megafon | 26–28 May 2026 | 1,010 | 21.3; 38 | 6.4; 11 | 8.8; 15 | 13.1; 23 | 0.5; 0 | 8.8; 15 | 6.2; 11 | 9.7; 17 | 10.4; 18 | 5.4; 10 | 7.3; 13 | 2.0; 4 | 0.2; 0 | 47.0; 83 | 9.3; 17 | 43.6; 75 | 50.1; 89 | 43.6; 75 |
| Voxmeter | 18–24 May 2026 | 1,016 | 20.9; 37 | 6.4; 11 | 8.4; 15 | 12.8; 23 | 0.8; 0 | 9.5; 17 | 7.2; 13 | 10.7; 19 | 10.1; 18 | 4.5; 8 | 6.0; 10 | 2.6; 4 | 0.1; 0 | 47.3; 84 | 8.6; 14 | 44.0; 77 | 48.7; 85 | 44.0; 77 |
| Voxmeter | 11–17 May 2026 | 1,010 | 20.7; 37 | 5.3; 9 | 7.7; 14 | 12.3; 22 | 0.5; 0 | 10.5; 19 | 6.7; 12 | 10.9; 19 | 10.4; 18 | 4.8; 8 | 7.0; 12 | 3.0; 5 | 0.2; 0 | 45.0; 80 | 10.0; 17 | 44.8; 78 | 48.3; 85 | 44.8; 78 |
| Voxmeter | 4–10 May 2026 | 1,002 | 22.0; 39 | 5.9; 10 | 7.9; 14 | 11.2; 20 | 0.8; 0 | 9.2; 16 | 7.5; 13 | 11.1; 20 | 9.8; 17 | 4.8; 9 | 7.3; 13 | 2.4; 4 | 0.1; 0 | 46.6; 82 | 9.7; 17 | 43.6; 76 | 48.8; 86 | 43.6; 76 |
| Verian | 28 Apr–5 May 2026 | 1,671 | 20.7; 37 | 5.3; 9 | 8.3; 15 | 12.7; 22 | 0.9; 0 | 9.5; 17 | 8.0; 14 | 12.0; 21 | 8.4; 15 | 5.0; 9 | 6.7; 12 | 2.4; 4 | 0.1; 0 | 48.1; 85 | 9.1; 16 | 44.1; 77 | 47.8; 84 | 44.1; 77 |
| Voxmeter | 27 Apr–3 May 2026 | 1,009 | 21.1; 38 | 5.7; 10 | 8.9; 16 | 12.3; 22 | 1.1; 0 | 8.5; 15 | 7.4; 14 | 10.6; 19 | 9.5; 17 | 5.1; 9 | 8.1; 15 | 1.7; 0 | 0.0; 0 | 46.5; 84 | 9.8; 15 | 43.7; 76 | 48.9; 87 | 43.7; 76 |
| Epinion | 22–28 Apr 2026 | 2,055 | 20.9; 37 | 5.3; 9 | 8.2; 14 | 13.0; 23 | 0.8; 0 | 8.8; 16 | 7.9; 14 | 11.8; 21 | 8.7; 15 | 5.2; 9 | 7.1; 13 | 2.0; 4 | 0.3; 0 | 47.9; 83 | 9.1; 17 | 43.5; 75 | 48.3; 86 | 43.5; 75 |
| Voxmeter | 20–26 Apr 2026 | 1,009 | 21.3; 38 | 5.4; 10 | 7.5; 13 | 13.1; 23 | 0.6; 0 | 8.7; 15 | 8.1; 14 | 10.0; 18 | 9.4; 17 | 5.9; 10 | 7.5; 13 | 2.5; 4 | 0.0; 0 | 47.9; 85 | 10.0; 17 | 42.1; 73 | 49.8; 88 | 42.1; 73 |
| Voxmeter | 13–19 Apr 2026 | 1,007 | 21.7; 39 | 6.3; 11 | 7.0; 12 | 12.2; 22 | 1.3; 0 | 9.1; 16 | 7.4; 13 | 11.4; 20 | 8.8; 16 | 5.5; 10 | 7.0; 12 | 2.2; 4 | 0.0; 0 | 47.6; 85 | 9.2; 16 | 43.1; 74 | 49.5; 88 | 43.1; 74 |
| Voxmeter | 6–12 Apr 2026 | 1,024 | 20.9; 37 | 6.2; 11 | 8.1; 14 | 12.2; 22 | 1.2; 0 | 9.2; 16 | 6.8; 12 | 11.9; 21 | 9.0; 16 | 5.0; 9 | 6.5; 12 | 2.9; 5 | 0.1; 0 | 46.1; 82 | 9.4; 17 | 44.4; 76 | 48.7; 87 | 44.4; 76 |
| Voxmeter | 30 Mar–5 Apr 2026 | 1,039 | 21.1; 38 | 6.3; 11 | 8.8; 16 | 12.5; 22 | 1.6; 0 | 8.7; 16 | 6.9; 12 | 10.3; 18 | 8.8; 16 | 5.7; 10 | 6.8; 12 | 2.3; 4 | 0.2; 0 | 46.8; 84 | 9.1; 16 | 43.9; 76 | 49.0; 87 | 43.9; 76 |
| 2026 election result | | – | 21.84; 38 | 5.81; 10 | 7.59; 13 | 11.59; 20 | 2.13; 4 | 9.37; 16 | 7.70; 14 | 9.10; 16 | 10.14; 18 | 5.75; 10 | 6.34; 11 | 2.57; 5 | 0.07; 0 | 46.94; 82 | 8.91; 16 | 44.08; 77 | 48.15; 85 | 44.08; 77 |
