= Jacob Harris =

Jacob Harris may refer to:

- Jacob Harris (cricketer), Pakistani cricketer
- Jacob Harris (American football) (born 1997), American football tight end
- Jacob Brown Harris (1830–1875), American lawyer and politician
- Jacob Harris Miller (born 1992), American singer, songwriter and rapper
- Jacob Harris Nielsen (born 1986), Danish politician
