= Nadja Natalie Isaksen =

Danish politician (born 1995)

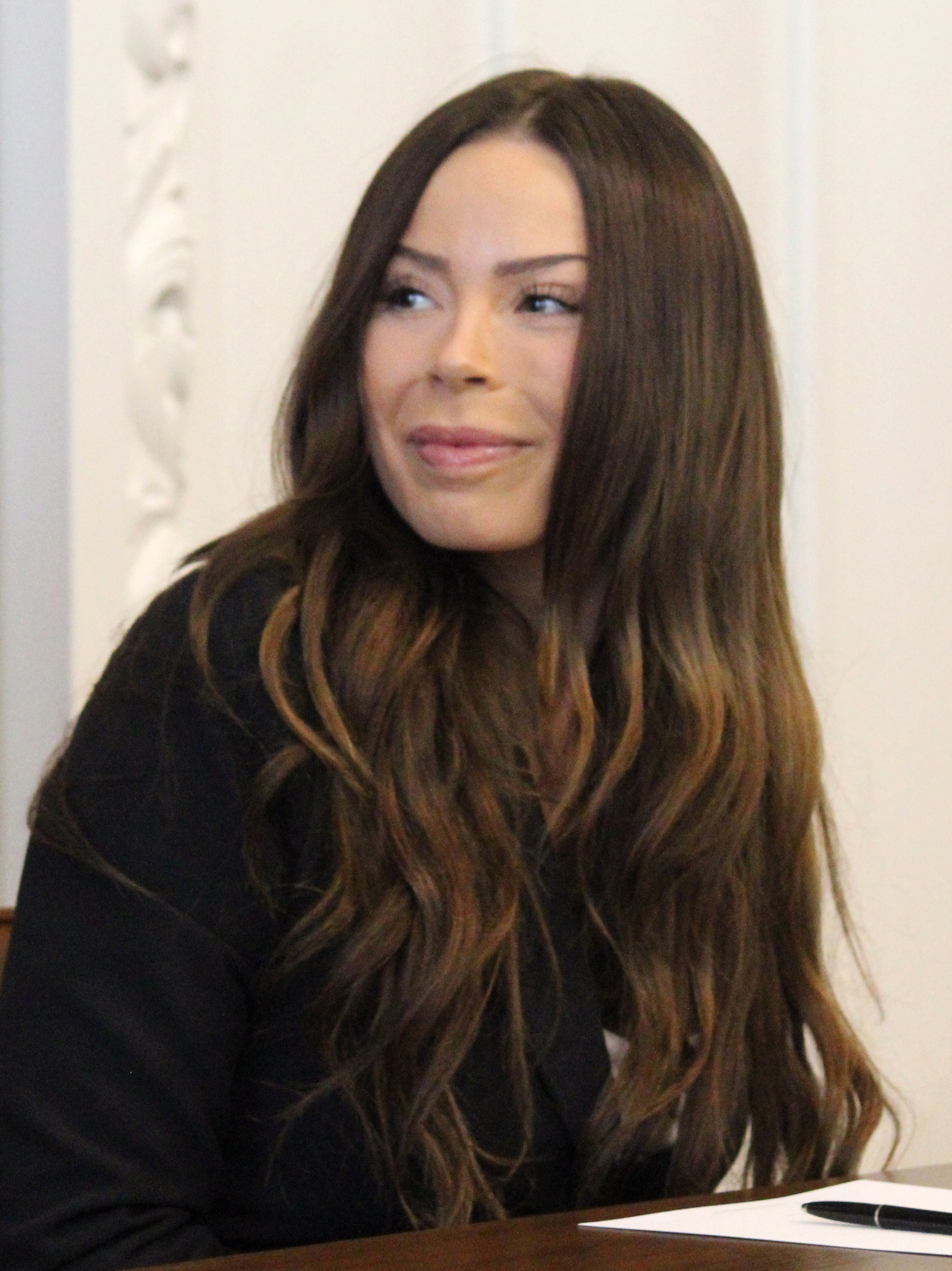
- Isaksen in 2026

Member of the Folketing
- Incumbent
- Assumed office 24 March 2026
- Constituency: South Jutland

Personal details
- Born: January 5, 1995 (age 31) Aalborg, Denmark
- Party: Independent (since 2026)
- Other political affiliations: Citizens' Party (2025–2026)
- Education: Aalborg University, Københavns Universitet

Nadja Natalie Isaksen (born 5 January 1995) is a Danish politician who was elected member of the Folketing in 2026. She got 1,301 personal votes. She was the immigration policy spokesperson of the Citizens' Party. In May 2026, she left the party to sit as an independent. As Emilie Schytte had already left, and Jacob Harris Nielsen had been excluded, it left only chairperson Lars Boje Mathiesen as the only representation in the Danish parliament.

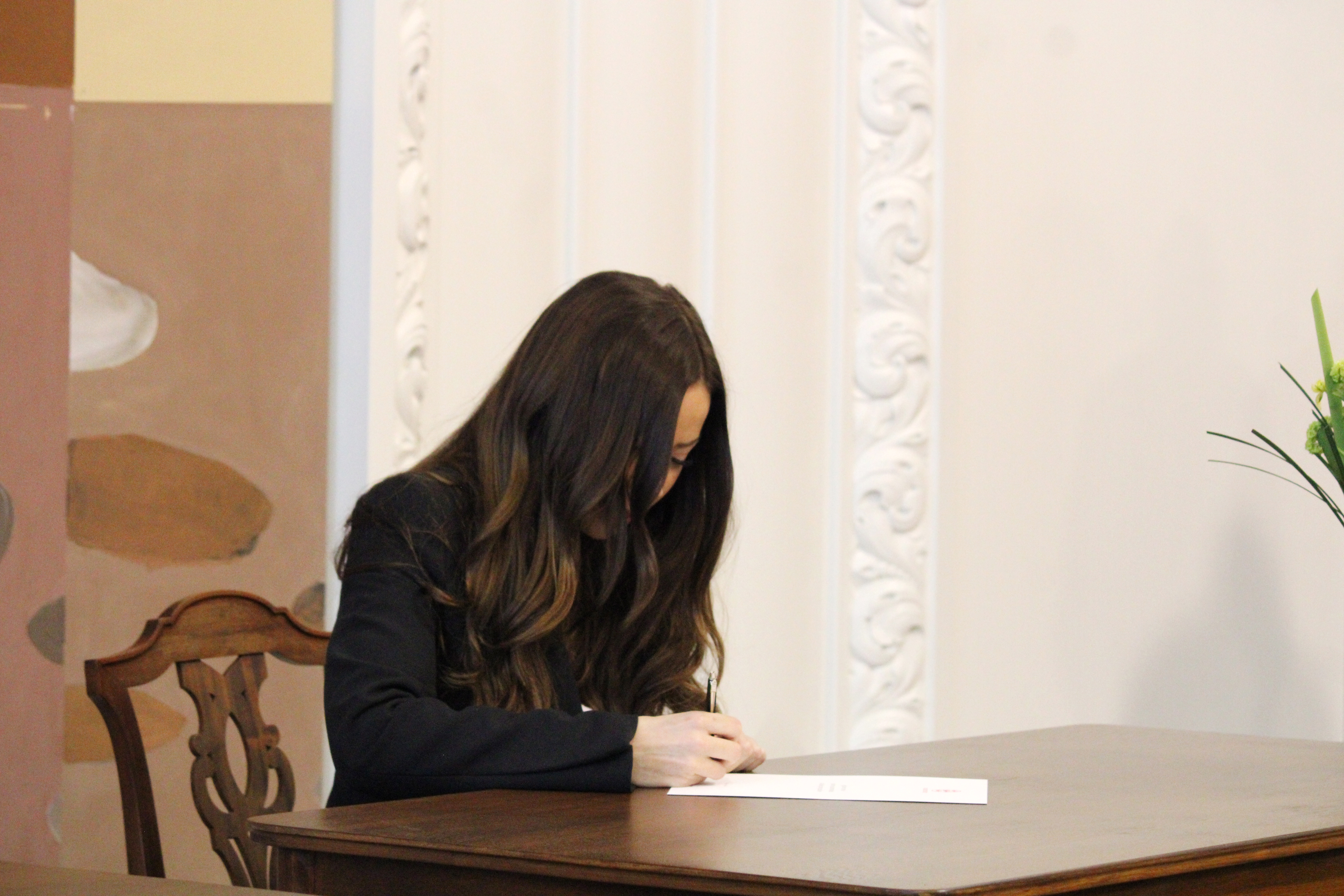
Isaksen signing a pledge to uphold the Danish Constitution at Christiansborg, 14 April 2026
