= Lars Boje Mathiesen =

Danish politician (born 1975)

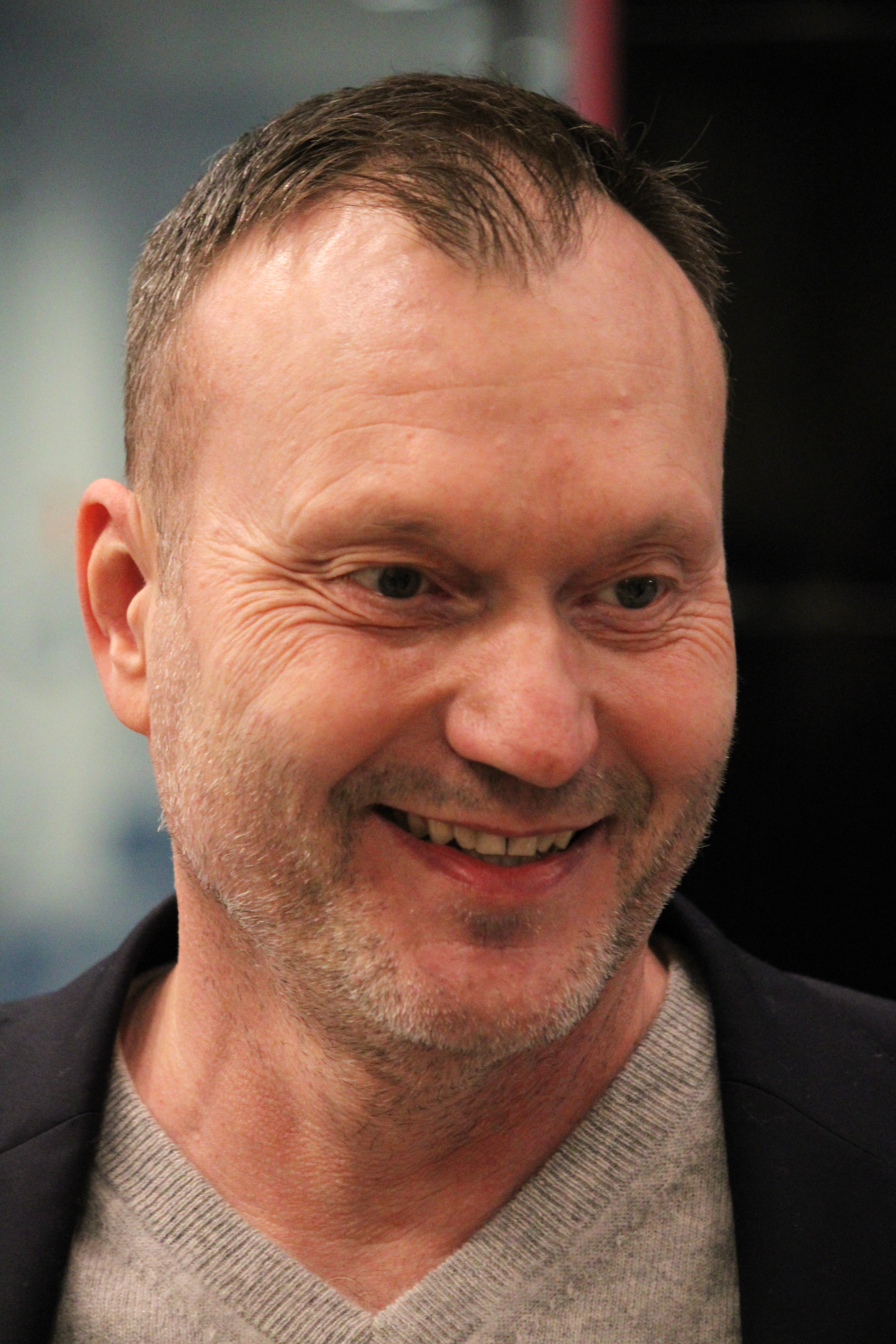
- Boje Mathiesen in 2026

Leader of the Citizens' Party
- Incumbent
- Assumed office 28 August 2024
- Preceded by: Party established

Leader of Nye Borgerlige
- In office 7 February – 9 March 2023
- Preceded by: Pernille Vermund
- Succeeded by: Pernille Vermund

Member of the Folketing
- Incumbent
- Assumed office 5 June 2019

Personal details
- Born: 21 May 1975 (age 51) Skive, Denmark
- Party: Citizens' Party (since 2024)
- Other political affiliations: Liberal Alliance (until 2016); Nye Borgerlige (2016–2023)

Lars Boje Mathiesen (born 21 May 1975) is a Danish politician who has been an independent member of the Danish Parliament, the Folketing, since March 2023. Previously a member of the Nye Borgerlige (New Right) political party before his expulsion in 2023, he was first elected to the Folketing at the 2019 general election for the Nye Borgerlige and again at the 2022 general election.

In February 2023, he succeeded Pernille Vermund as leader of the Nye Borgerlige, but was dismissed and expelled from the party in March after disputes over remuneration and campaign finances.

== Background ==
Boje was born on 21 May 1975 in Skive and is the son of musician Peter Boje Mathiesen and Inge Burmølle Mathiesen. He grew up on a disused farm near Ribe, according to his own statement in a hippie family. He is a trained primary schoolteacher, having studied at Ribe Seminarium and Nørre Nissum Seminarium in 2000 to 2005. He worked as a primary schoolteacher at various schools from 2005 to 2019. As a teacher, he has taught social studies, English, Christianity and history.

He studied management and psychology in the United States at Southeast Missouri State University. Previously, he had his own hotel and café in Ribe.

== Political career ==
=== Liberal Alliance (2013–2016) ===
Boje's career in politics started in 2013, where he was elected into Aarhus Municipality's municipal council, as a member of Liberal Alliance. He left the party in 2016 and, after a short unaffiliated period, joined Nye Borgerlige. He chose not to stand again in the next local election, but instead to seek a seat in the Folketing.

=== Nye Borgerlige (2016–2023) ===
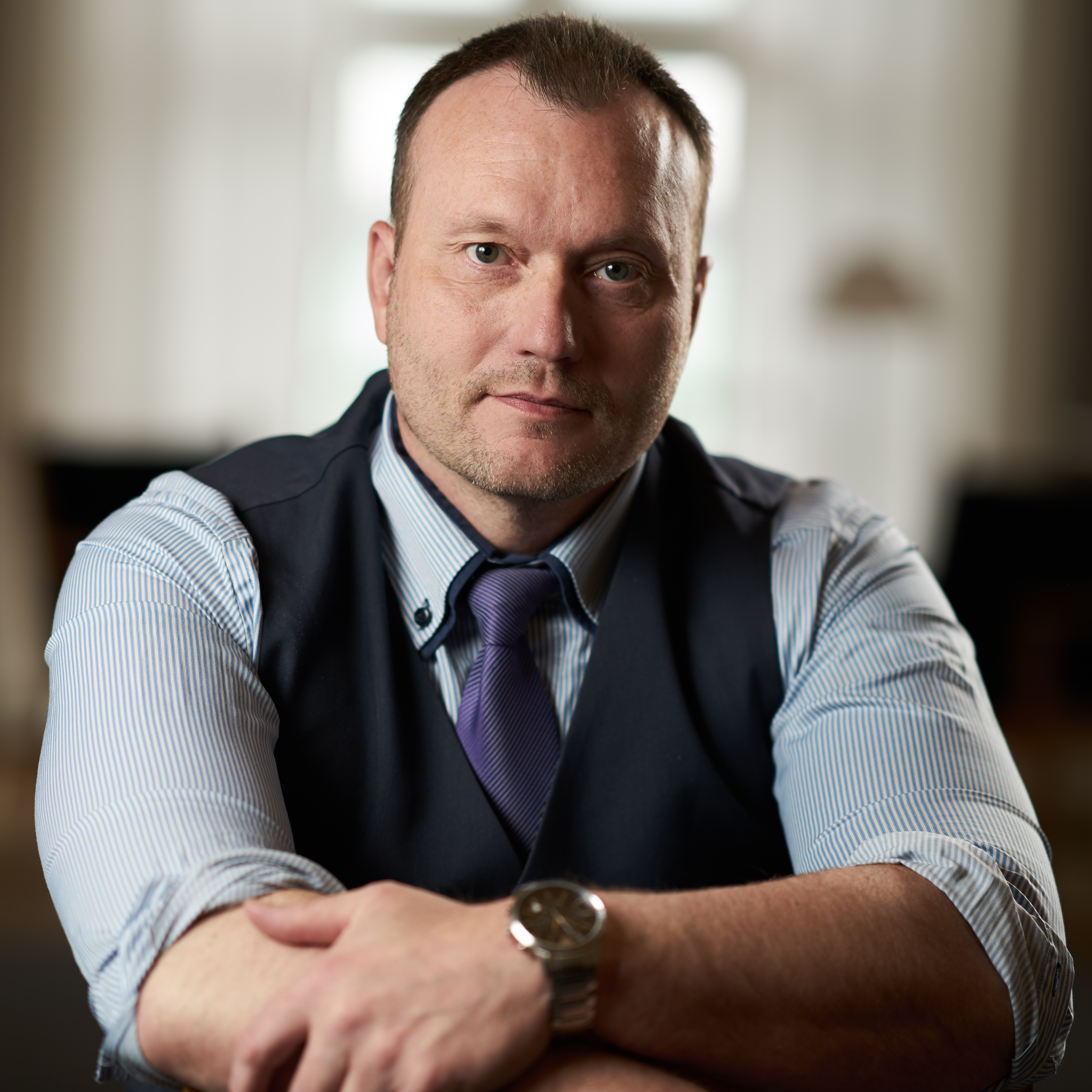
Boje Mathiesen at Christiansborg, 18 May 2020

Lars Boje Mathiesen was elected a member of the Folketing at the 2019 general election on 5 June for East Jutland. In May 2021, he caused a social media backlash when he compared the right to free menstrual products to having "underpants in public toilets" in case someone soils themselves, a comparison that was described as "pure nonsense" by Charlotte Wilkens, chief physician at the Department of Gynecology and Obstetrics at Hvidovre Hospital.

=== Leadership (February–March 2023) ===
On 10 January 2023, Pernille Vermund announced her intention to step down as leader of Nye Borgerlige, explaining her resignation with a desire to get her "life and family back". At an extraordinary national executive (hovedbestyrelse) meeting on 17 January, Boje announced his candidature for the leadership post, receiving support from most of the parliamentary group. On 25 January 2023, it was announced that no other candidate than Boje had entered the race. Consequently, he unanimously assumed office at the party's convention in Fredericia on 7 February 2023.

Some commentators predicted that the election of Boje would move the party towards a less pragmatic, less national conservative and more liberal and protest party-like position, though Boje himself stated that he would continue the political line of Vermund. However, he remained only party leader for a month, as on 10 March it was announced that the national executive of Nye Borgerlige had, the day prior, unanimously chosen to dismiss Boje as party leader and expel him from the party because of disputes over remuneration and campaign finances. At the same time, Vermund conveyed her willingness to once again take over as party leader and to run in the next general election. In October 2023, she was unanimously elected as party chairman once more.

As a side effect of Boje's expulsion, the party is set to lose a substantial part of its public funds, effective after 12 months.

=== Citizens' Party (2023 onwards) ===
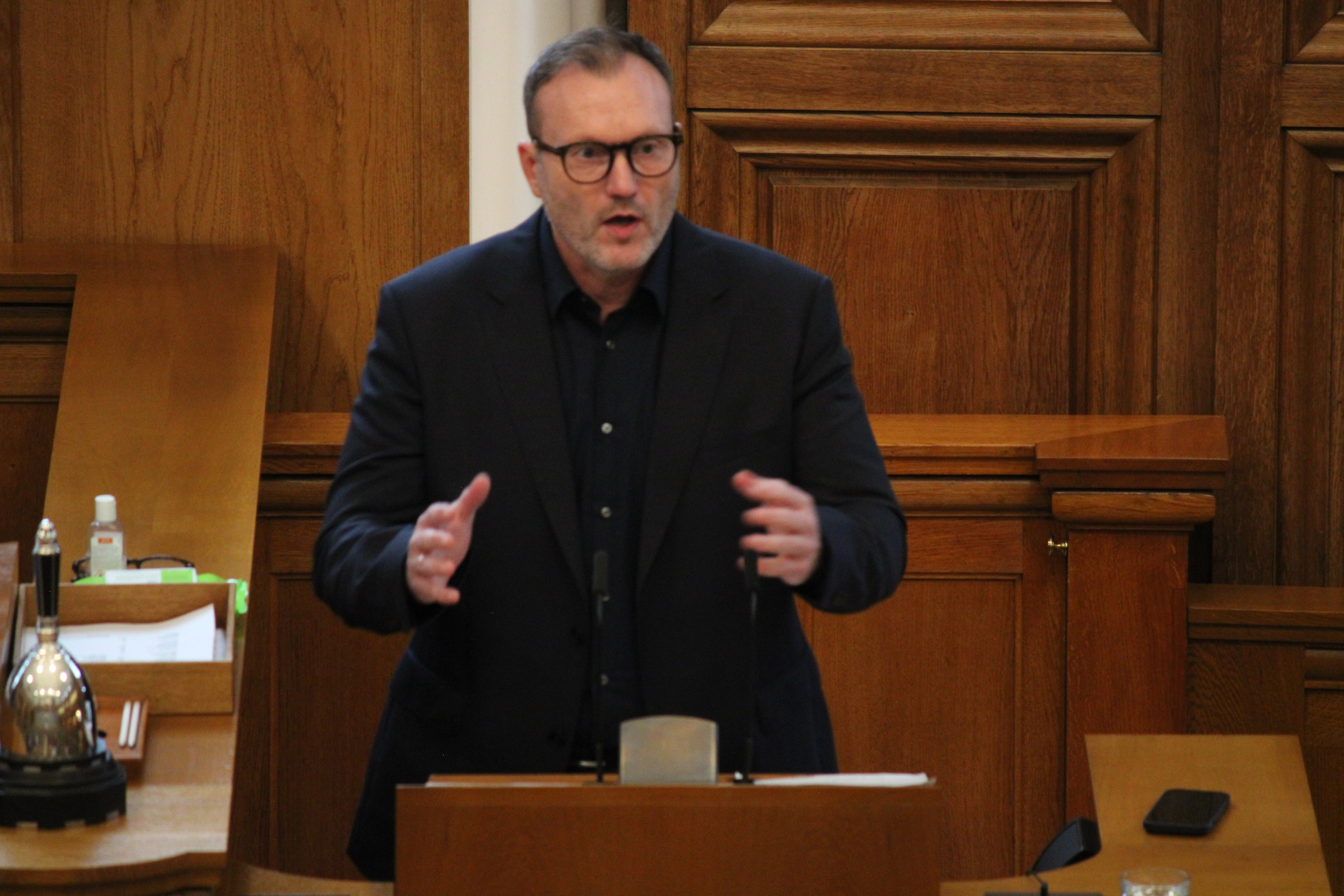
Boje Mathiesen speaking in the Danish parliament, October 2025

Boje continued in the Folketing as an independent. On 12 April 2023, Boje hinted at the possibility of founding his own party. On 28 August 2024, he announced a new party, The Citizens' Party. On 17 December 2024, it had obtained the 20,195 signatures required to obtain ballot access for the next Danish election. The party formally obtained ballot access on 15 January 2025, and was assigned the party letter H by the Interior Ministry.

At the 2026 Danish general election the party got 2.1% of the votes, 0.1% above the minimum threshold, which resulted in 4 mandates in the Folketing. Four days after the election, Boje excluded recently elected member Jacob Harris, and 11 days after the election Emilie Schytte withdrew from the party, cutting the party's mandates in half. Schytte accused Boje of abuse of power within the party, calling it a 'pyramid scheme'. In May 2026 Nadja Natalie Isaksen also left the party, leaving him as the only party member left in parliament.
