= Folketing =

Unicameral legislature of Denmark

Coordinates: 55°40′34″N 12°34′47″E

Parliament of Denmark Folketinget (Danish)
- 72nd Folketing

Type
- Type: Unicameral

Leadership
- Speaker: Henrik Frandsen, Moderates since 6 October 2026
- First Deputy Speaker: Leif Lahn Jensen, Social Democrats
- Second Deputy Speaker: Karsten Hønge, Green Left
- Third Deputy Speaker: Jacob Jensen, Venstre
- Fourth Deputy Speaker: Morten Messerschmidt, Danish People's Party

Structure
- Seats: 179
- Political groups: Government (Frederiksen III Cabinet) (82): Social Democrats (38); Green Left (20); Moderates (14); Social Liberals (10); Supported by (20) (Note: MPs grouping with the government parties for the purposes of committee seats.): Red–Green Alliance (11); Alternative (5); Social Democratic (1) (Note: Faroese political party represented in the Danish parliament.); Union (1); Inuit Ataqatigiit (1) (Note: Greenlandic political party represented in the Danish parliament.); Naleraq (1); Opposition (77): Venstre (17); Danish People's (16); Liberal Alliance (15); The Conservatives (13); Denmark Democrats (10); Citizens' (1); Independent (5) (Note: Cecilie Liv Hansen; Jacob Harris; Preben Bang Henriksen; Nadja Natalie Isaksen; Emilie Schytte)

Elections
- Voting system: Open list proportional representation through the D'Hondt method (for constituency seats) and Largest remainder method (for leveling seats) with a 2% election threshold for levelling seats See Elections in Denmark
- Last election: 24 March 2026
- Next election: On or before 23 March 2030

Meeting place
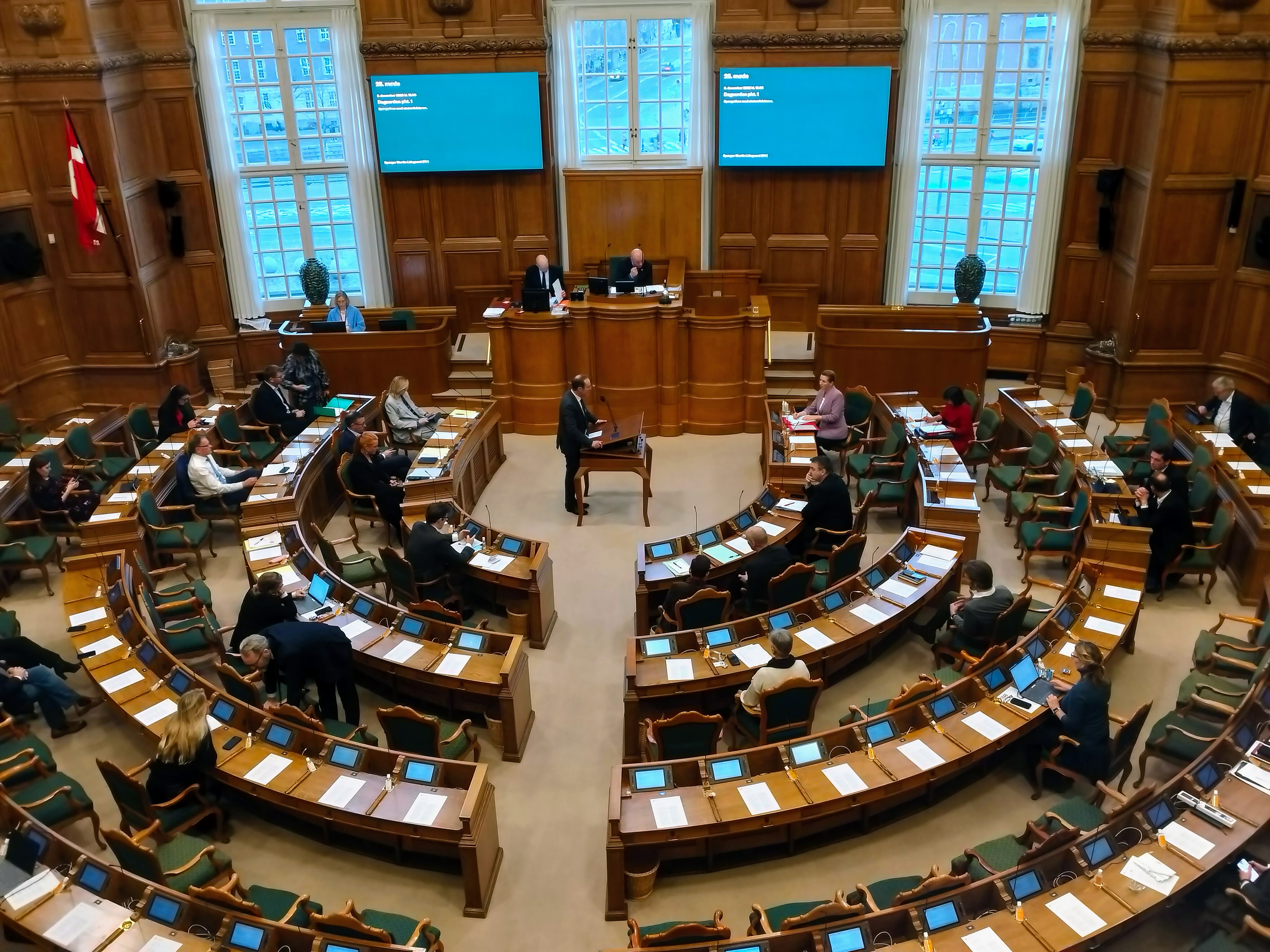
- Folketingssalen, Christiansborg Palace, Copenhagen

Website
- thedanishparliament.dk

The Folketing (Danish: Folketinget [ˈfʌlkəˌtsʰe̝ŋˀð̩], lit. 'the People's Thing'), also known as the Parliament of Denmark or the Danish Parliament in English, is the unicameral national legislature (parliament) of the Kingdom of Denmark — Denmark proper together with the Faroe Islands and Greenland. Established in 1849, the Folketing was the lower house of the bicameral parliament called the Rigsdag until 1953; the upper house was the Landsting.

The Folketing meets in Christiansborg Palace, on the island of Slotsholmen in central Copenhagen. It passes all laws, approves the cabinet, and supervises the work of the government. It is also responsible for adopting the state's budgets and approving the state's accounts. As set out in the Constitution of Denmark, the Folketing shares power with the reigning monarch. But in practice, the monarch's role is limited to signing laws passed by the legislature; this must be done within 30 days of adoption.

The Folketing consists of 179 members; including two from Greenland and two from the Faroe Islands. General elections must be held every four years, but it is within the powers of the prime minister to ask the monarch to call for an election before the term has elapsed. On a vote of no confidence, the Folketing may force a single minister or the entire government to resign.

Members are democratically elected by proportional representation: 135 directly in constituencies using the D'Hondt method, alongside 40 leveling seats. The Danish political system has traditionally generated coalitions. Most post-war governments have been minority coalitions ruling with the support of non-government parties. The first sitting of the house is usually attended by the king.

== History ==
From 1849 to 1953, the Folketing was one of the two houses in the bicameral parliament known as the Rigsdag; the other house was known as Landsting. The difference between the houses was their sizes, franchises, and electoral systems.

The Folketing was elected by common vote among men and consisted mainly of independent farmers, traders, and merchants as well as the educated classes. From 1866 to 1915, the right to vote for the Landsting was restricted to the wealthiest, and some of its members were appointed by the king; so it predominantly represented the landed gentry and other conservatives. From 1915, both men and women had the right of vote for both houses, and the Landsting was elected by common vote, although indirectly and with a higher age limit than for the Folketing. During the next decades, law-making mainly took place in the Folketing, and the Landsting came to be regarded as a superfluous rubber stamp.

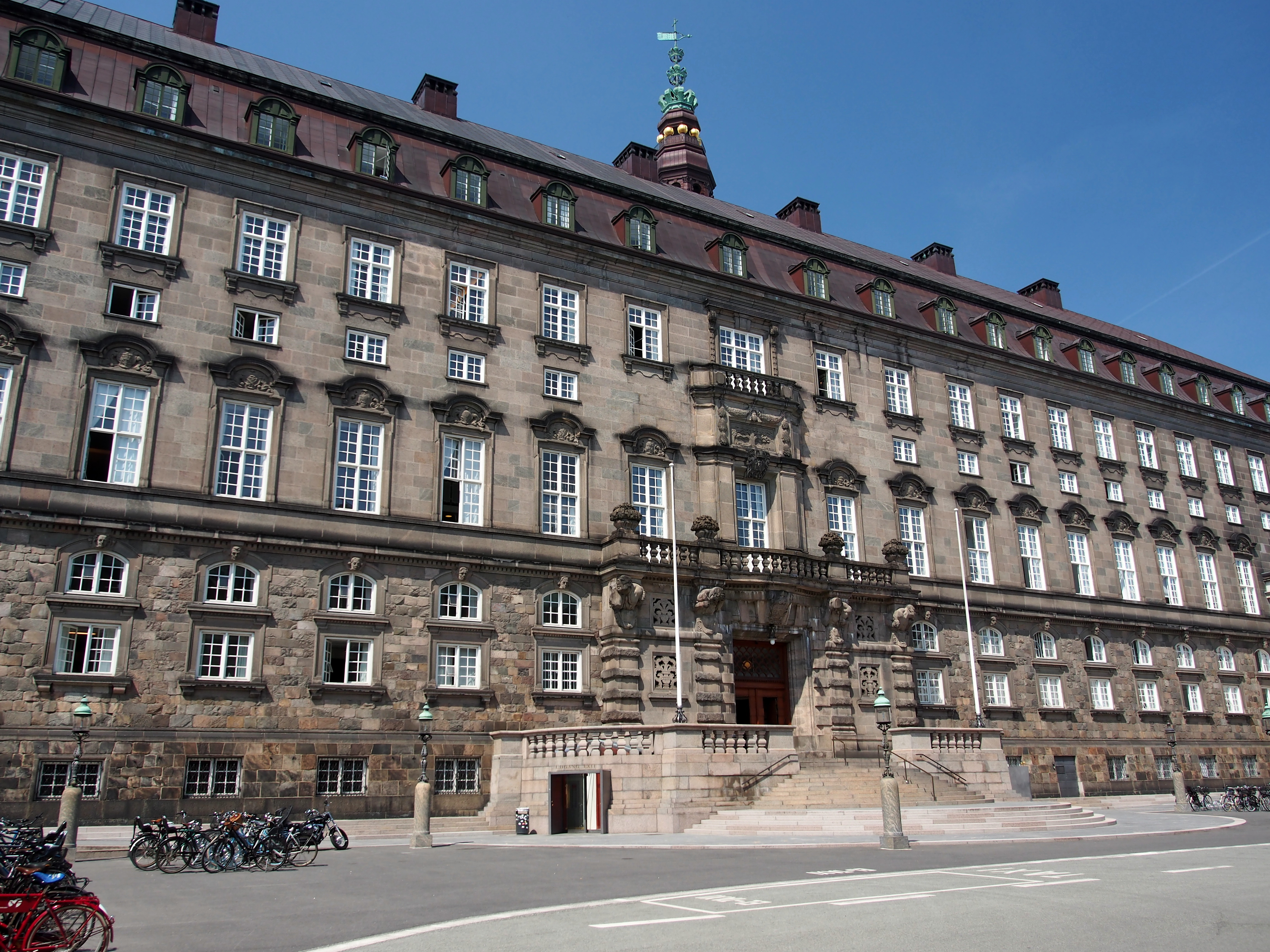
Christiansborg Palace, the location of the Folketing chamber since 1849

In 1953, a revised constitution was adopted by a referendum. Among the changes was the elimination of the Landsting and the introduction of a unicameral system, with the Folketing becoming the sole parliamentary chamber. Christiansborg Palace (also known by its nickname Borgen, Danish for "the castle") has been the domicile of parliament since 1849. The palace is in the heart of Copenhagen.

Gaining representation in parliament normally requires only 2% of the national vote. With such a low election threshold a large number of parties are represented in the chamber, making it all but impossible for one party to win the 90 seats necessary for a majority. No single party has achieved this since the 1903 elections. All Danish governments since then have been coalitions or one-party minority governments. The constitution allows a government to take office without getting a vote of confidence and stay in office as long as it does not lose a vote of no confidence. One consequence is that, unlike in most other parliamentary systems, most Danish governments in modern times are not assured that their legislative agendas will pass, forcing them to assemble a majority for each individual piece of legislation.

== Constitutional requirements and electoral system ==
Composition of members

- The Folketing consists of 179 members all elected for a four-year term or until the prime minister (via the King-in-council) calls for elections, whichever comes first. 175 members are elected in Denmark proper, while Greenland and the Faroe Islands each elect two members in separate constituencies.
- The constitution does not mention political parties at all, although the electoral act does, and MPs are almost always elected for a party. The only independent who has been elected in modern times is the comedian Jacob Haugaard, but independents, usually unknown ones, are seen at every election. Requirements for standing as an independent candidate are much more lenient than for a new party (signatures from 150 eligible voters), but independents are only allowed to contest in a single constituency, making it difficult to gain the needed number of votes for a seat.

Voting system

- The Constitution requires "equal representation of the various opinions of the electorate", and for regional representation to be secured. The electoral act stipulates the details for this: 135 seats are elected by proportional representation in 10 constituencies, and 40 levelling seats are allotted to make up for the difference between constituency and nationwide vote. The 135 district seats are distributed to the parties by the D'Hondt method under a party-list system. The 40 levelling seats are allocated to the parties using the largest remainder method, and then distributed across electoral provinces with the Sainte-Laguë method and across constituencies with quotients of 1, 4, 7, and so on. Each party may choose among a number of methods for how the seats won by that party are to be distributed among its candidates, with most choosing to use an open list.
- The overall result is proportional to the number of votes cast for each party; however, in rare cases, the largest parties may gain one or two seats extra from smaller parties.
- The voter may vote for a party list, one of the candidates on a party list, or an independent candidate. Voting for a candidate on a party list also gives a vote to that party.
- Parties (usually district party associations) decide on the nomination of candidates before the election. When an open list is used, candidates are elected according to personal votes (including assigned votes). When a relatively closed list is used, only an extreme number of personal votes can change the rank of the list order.
- Parties must either pass the threshold of 2% of the national vote, or gain a constituency seat to gain any supplemental seats. Though very rare, it is possible for a party to gain a constituency seat without getting 2% of the national vote. There is also an esoteric third rule that allows a party to be represented, if it has enough votes in two of the three electoral provinces that the country is divided into. No party has ever fulfilled this rule without getting 2% of the national vote.
- To stand for election, parties that are not currently represented in Parliament must collect signatures of support from approximately 20,000 voters (the number of valid votes cast in Denmark proper at the latest election, divided by 175—the equivalent of one seat; after the 2019 election the required number is 20,195). As of 2016, it is possible to submit and collect signatures digitally.

Voter requirements

- Denmark has universal suffrage for all citizens 18 years and older who live in the realm and who have not been declared incapable of managing their own affairs. The constitution makes it possible to restrict suffrage for convicted criminals and people receiving social benefits, but this option has not been used for several decades.
- All voters who have not been convicted of criminal acts that makes them unworthy for a seat in the parliament, are eligible. Parliament decides if a member is eligible or not (after their election). Parliament can also decide that an incumbent member is ineligible, if a member is convicted of a crime during a term. This happened after the Impeachment of Inger Støjberg in 2021.

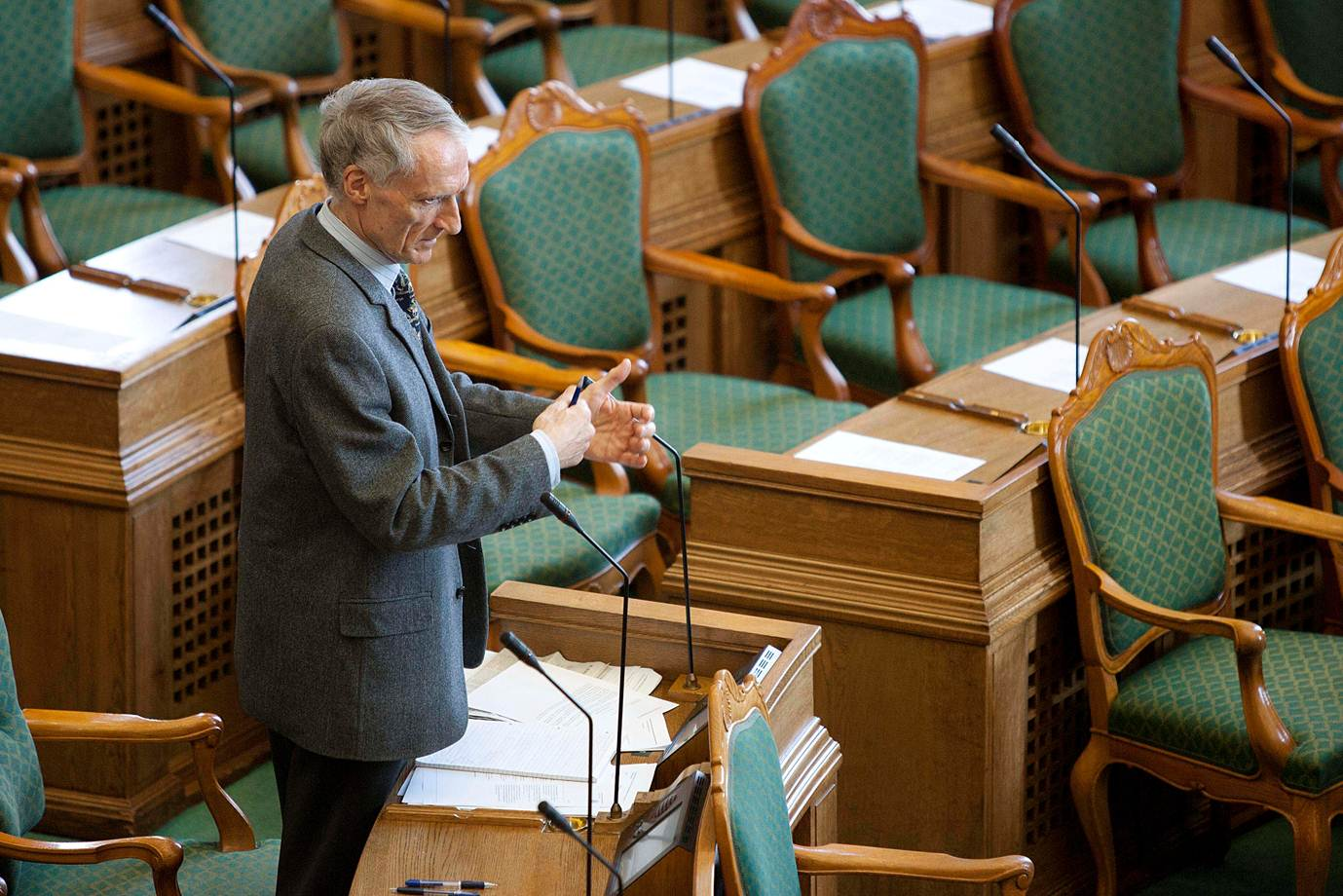
Bertel Haarder (V) making a speech

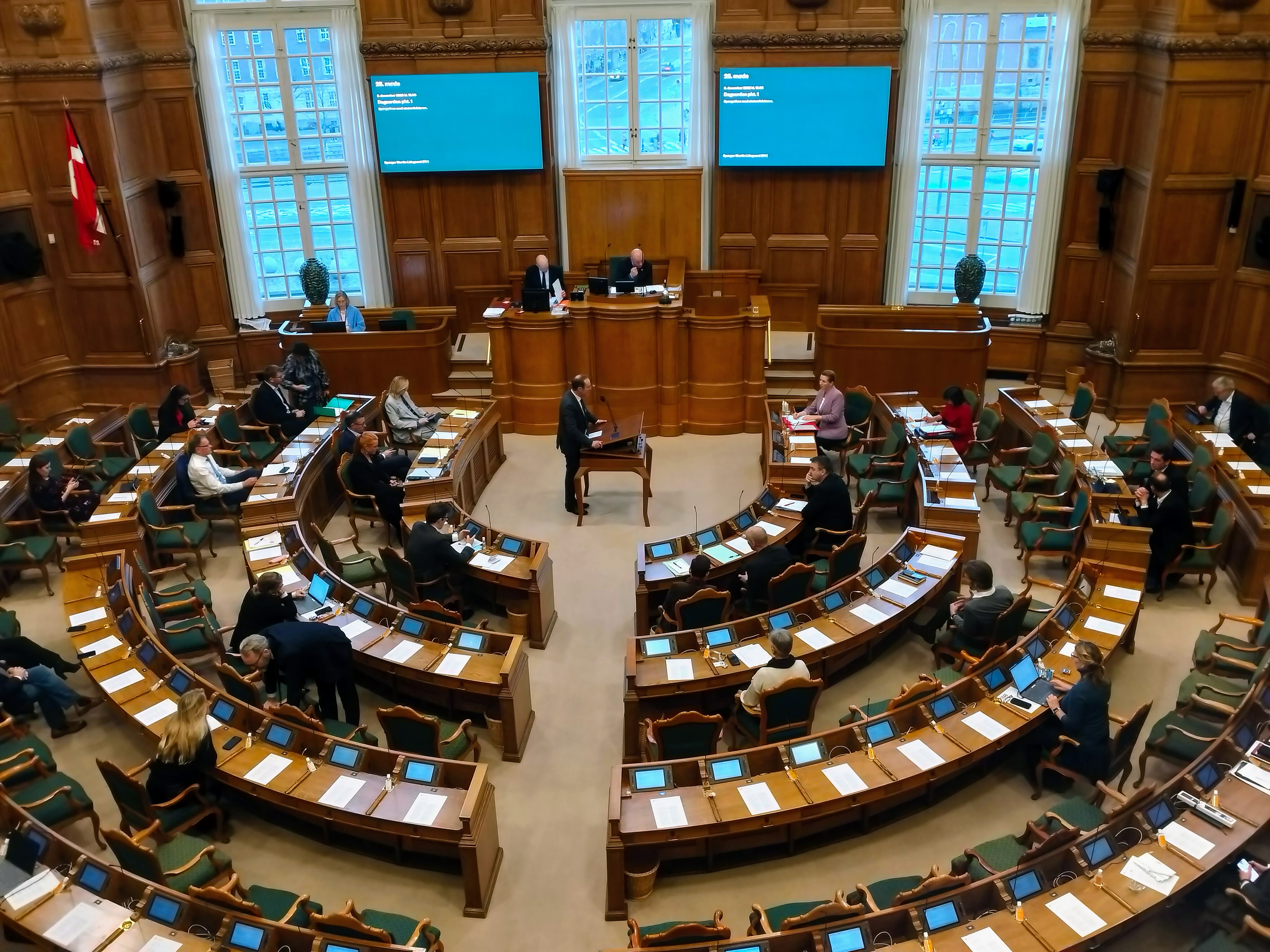
View from the gallery

Parliamentary privileges

- Members enjoy immunity, meaning that no criminal charges may be brought against an MP, unless they are caught red-handed, provided the Folketing does not lift the immunity. The purpose of this is to prevent political persecution. In practice the Folketing has almost always lifted the immunity when a member has been accused of a crime, usually with the consent of the accused member themself.
- Debates can be conducted behind closed doors, although this has not happened since 9 April 1940, day of the German invasion in World War II.

Ministers

- Ministers may hold a seat in parliament, but they do not need to. Supreme Court judges—according to convention—may not hold a seat whilst also acting as judges.
- Ministers may—even if they are not MPs—demand talking time whenever they want.

Legislating

- Bills may be brought before parliament by members (private member's bills) and ministers. Bills are predominantly brought before parliament by ministers, because they have the Law Office of the Ministry of Justice at their disposal. Instead of putting forward a private bill, the opposition usually put forward a proposal for parliamentary decision, i.e., a short resolution that addresses the subject and directs the relevant minister to propose a bill concerning it.

== Forming a parliament ==
The 179 members of the folketing are directly elected to four-year terms, subject to calls for early elections. All Danish citizens 18 years or older may vote in legislative elections, which are conducted by secret ballot. Folketing seats are allocated among the various parties using the D'Hondt method of party list proportional representation. A party or electoral alliance must pass the election threshold of 2% of the overall vote to be allocated a seat.

=== Coalition governments ===
The Danish political system is characterised by a fusion of powers, with the government being drawn from the ranks of the Folketing. Denmark is governed by a cabinet and a prime minister who do not have a majority in the Folketing against them (negative parliamentarism). Since no single party in Denmark has had an absolute majority in the Folketing since 1903, in order to pass laws, the prime minister must form alliances with parties outside their own party. This either results in a coalition cabinet of multiple parties, or a single-party minority government.

During his first term in 2009 to 2011, Lars Løkke Rasmussen led a centre-right minority government consisting of the Liberal Party (Venstre) and the Conservative People's Party. This coalition government worked with regular parliamentary support from the national conservative Danish People's Party and often gained the necessary 90th seat for majority in the Folketing through negotiations with either the sole MP from the Christian Democrats, Ørum-Jørgensen or another MP outside parties, Christmas Møller, both elected in 2007 as conservative MPs and having defected since then.

Since the 2007 elections, the Liberal Alliance (previously Ny Alliance) gained momentum in opinion polls, and since early 2010 the governing coalition have not been able to gather a majority in the polls without the support of the Alliance. The continuing rise in the polls is to an extent the result of the internal crisis in the Conservative People's Party over the leadership of Lene Espersen and the continuing debate over a lack of "true" liberal/conservative ideology in government policy.

On 13 January 2011 the continuing turmoil in the Conservative group in the Folketing caused Lene Espersen to resign as political leader of the party and focus on her role as Minister of Foreign Affairs. A leadership election between Brian Mikkelsen, the Minister of Economic and Business Affairs and Lars Barfoed, the Justice Minister, was widely expected, but on 14 January the Conservative group in the Folketing unanimously elected Barfoed as their new political leader.

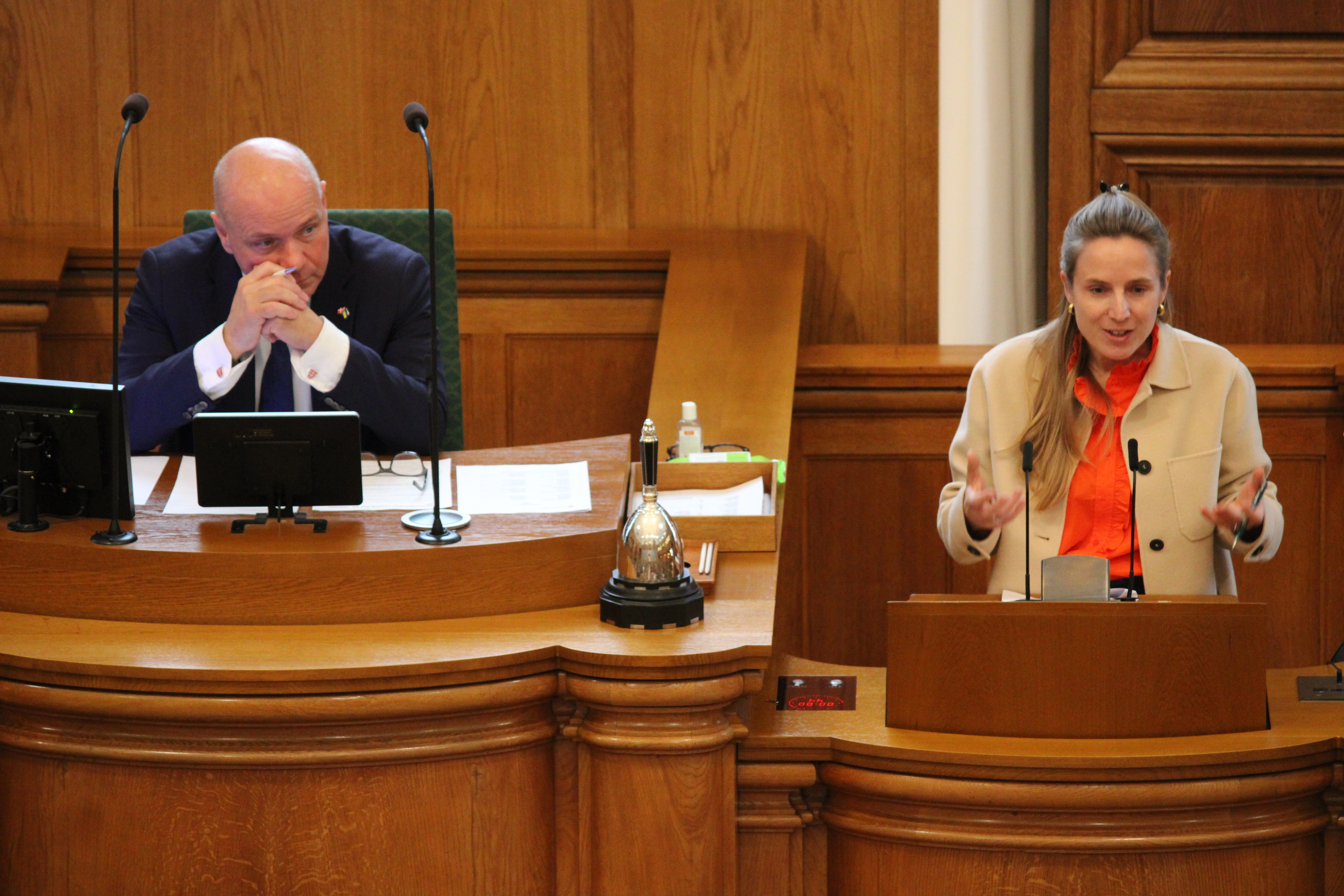
The Speaker (Søren Gade) presiding over a session with a member (Theresa Scavenius) speaking

The Social Democrats under the leadership of Helle Thorning-Schmidt have enjoyed continuing majorities in opinion polls since late 2009 and hope to form a centre-left government coalition consisting of the Socialist People's Party and the Social Liberal Party with parliamentary support from the small Red-Green Alliance.

Both Margrethe Vestager (Social Liberal Party) and Villy Søvndal (Socialist People's Party) pledged their support to Thorning-Schmidt before the 2011 election. But there has been considerable debate about the future politics of this coalition, mainly because the Social Liberal Party demands a more liberal economic agenda. Also on immigration issues there are political differences between the three coalition parties. This has led some observers to believe that the Social Liberal Party will not join a government coalition but instead opt to be a part of the parliamentary support of a new, centre-left government. In the event the Social Liberals did join the new three-party coalition government formed on 3 October.

Following the 2015 general election, Thorning-Schmidt was replaced as prime minister by her predecessor Lars Løkke Rasmussen. Until 28 November 2016, he led a government consisting only of Venstre—a very unusual situation in Danish politics.

== Organisation ==
=== Speaker ===
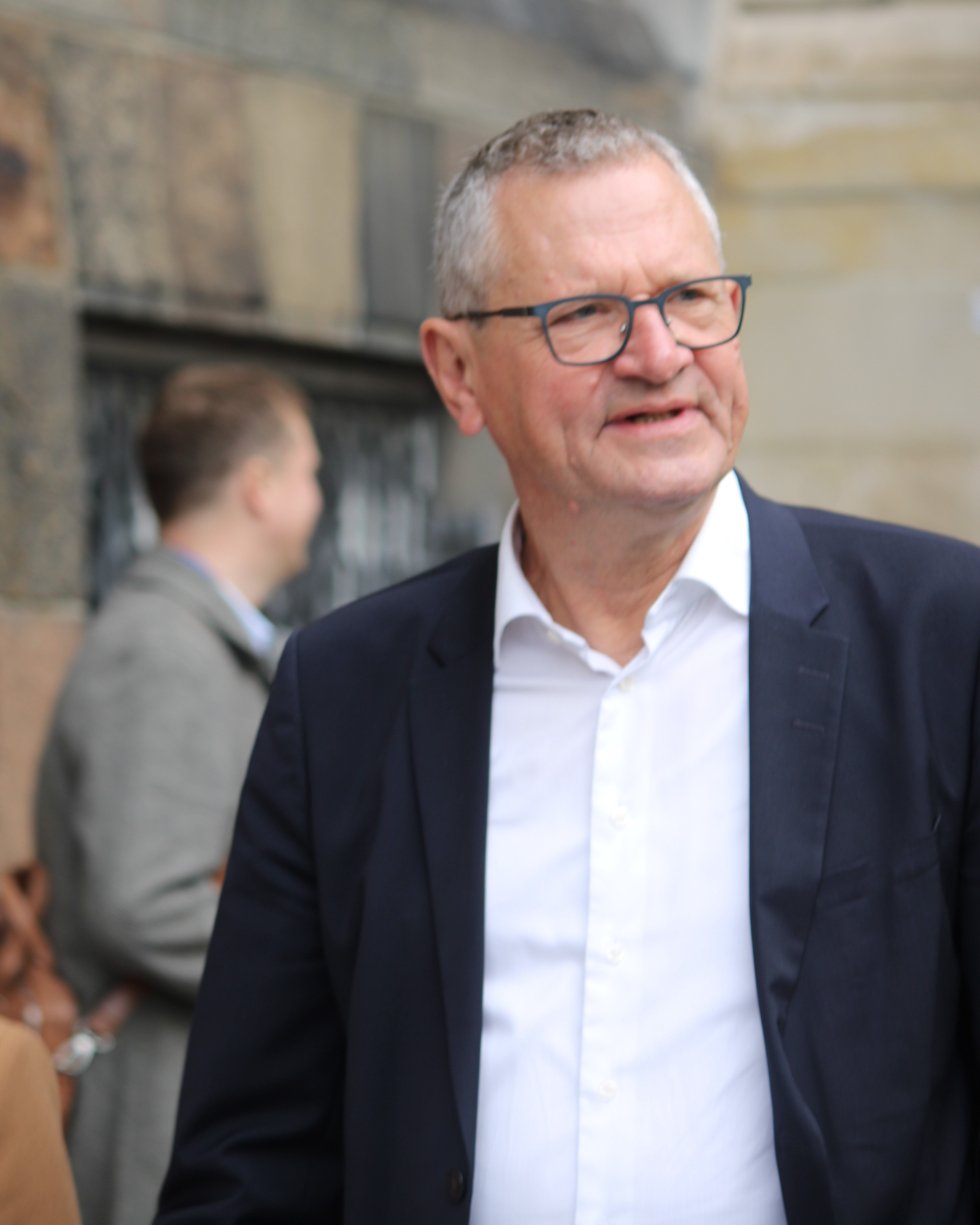
Henrik Frandsen,
Speaker since 2026

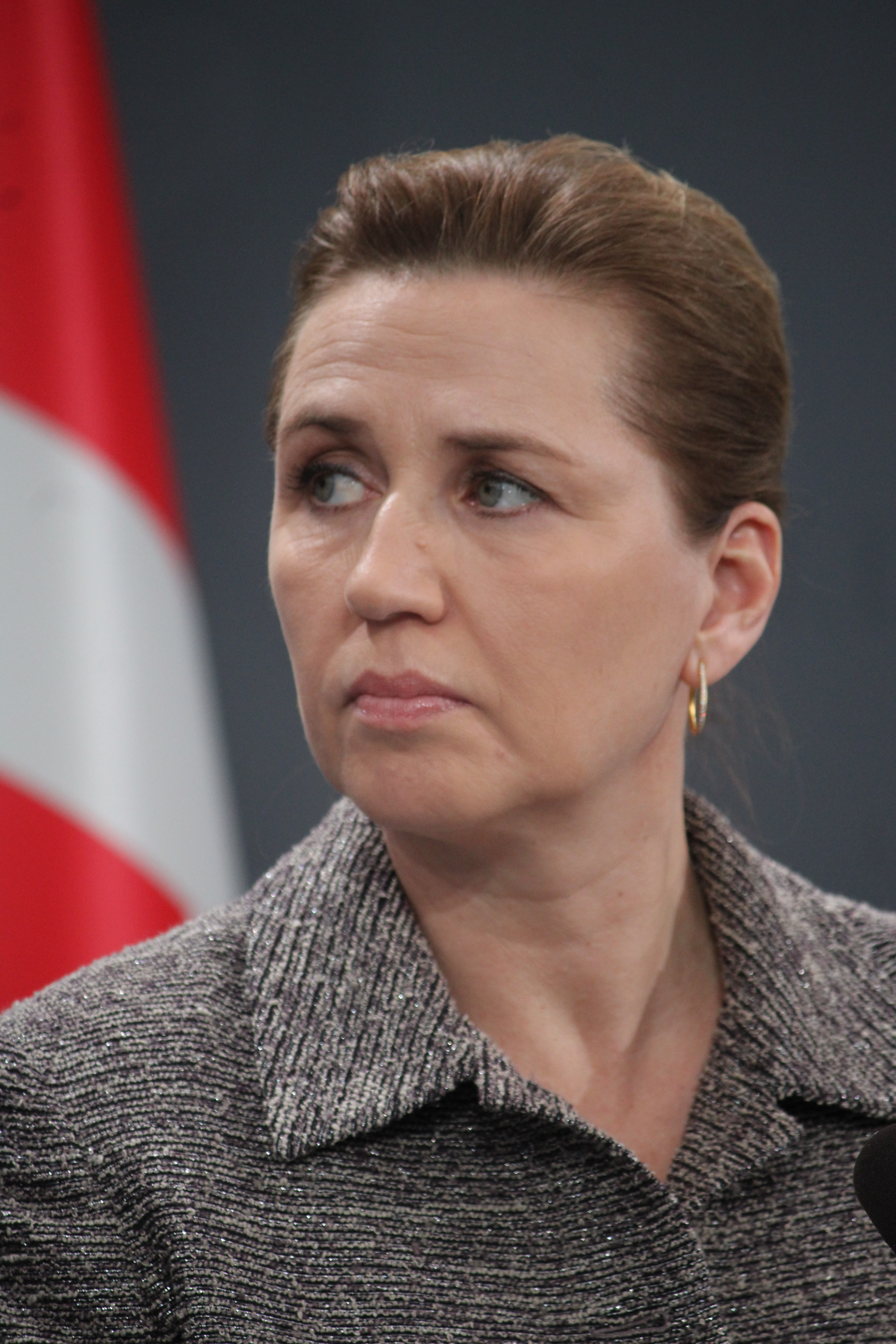
Mette Frederiksen,
Prime Minister since 2019

The Speaker is the presiding officer of the Folketing. The Speaker determines which members may speak, and is responsible for maintaining order during debates. The position was created in 1850, and the inaugural holder of the office was Carl Christoffer Georg Andræ. The current Speaker is Henrik Frandsen of the Moderates. The Speaker and four Deputy Speakers are elected by MPs at the opening of parliament after each general election and compose presidium of the body.

Position	Member	Party
President	Søren Gade	Venstre
First Deputy Speaker	Leif Lahn Jensen	Social Democrats
Second Deputy Speaker	Karsten Hønge	Green Left
Third Deputy Speaker	Jacob Jensen	Venstre
Fourth Deputy Speaker	Morten Messerschmidt	Danish People's Party

=== Standing committees ===
The members of parliament are allocated into thirty standing parliamentary committees. The standing committees have a portfolio that covers that of one or more government ministers.

== Composition ==
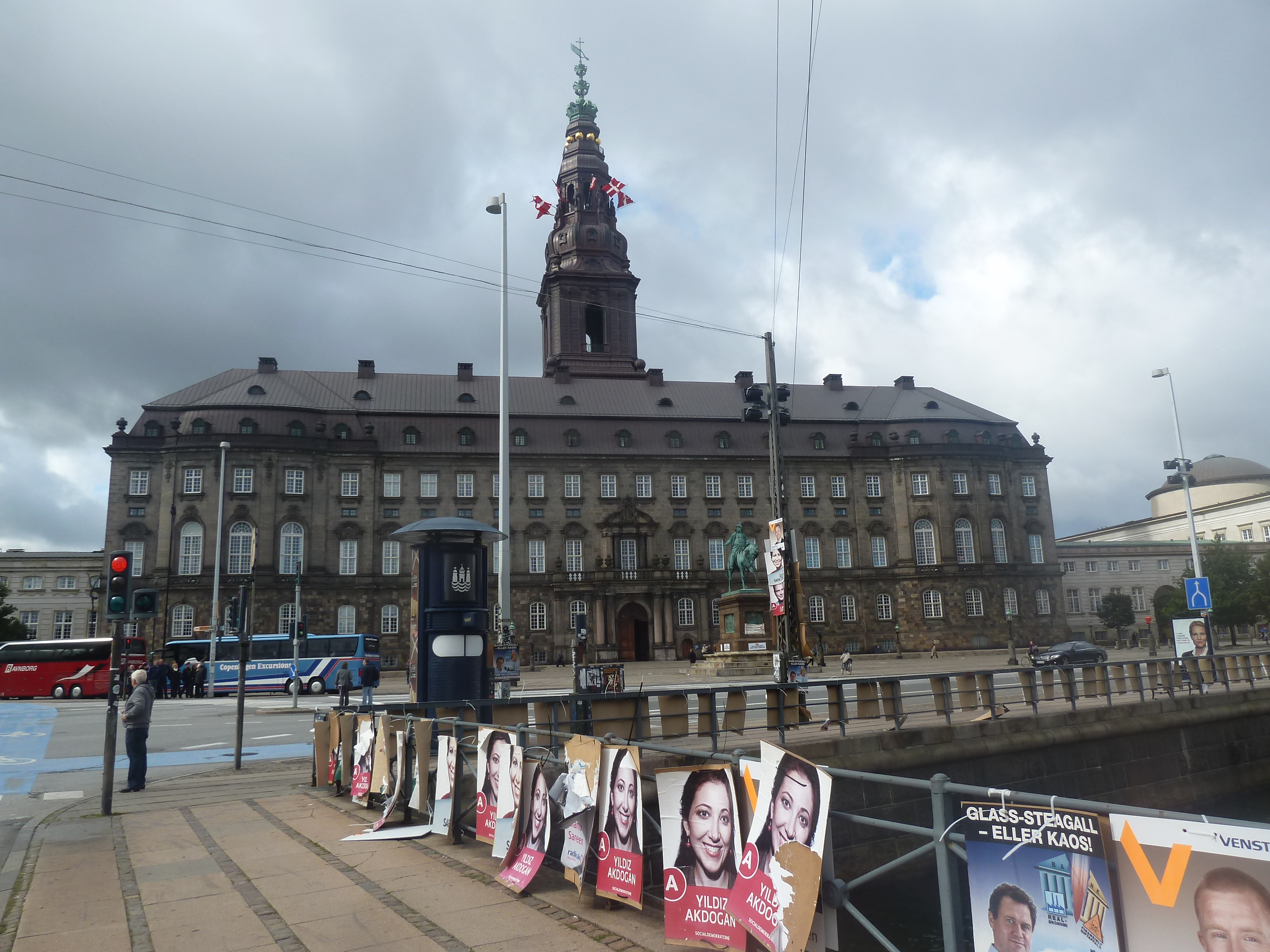
Christiansborg Palace, the seat of the three branches of government: the Folketing, the Prime Minister's Office and the Supreme Court. Here it is surrounded by posters, a typical scene during an election season.

=== Demographics ===
Although Denmark is a representative democracy, a bias is seen in the demographics of the Folketing as opposed to the demographics of Denmark, with middle-aged men over-represented, the Folketing is therefore not a direct representation of the country.

About one-third of seats have been switched for new members every election, a figure that has stayed more or less constant over previous elections. The largest change in these figures was seen in the election of 1973, where 45 percent of seats saw new members, and the lowest change was in the election of 1988, when 14.8 percent of members were newcomers.

Since the incorporation of women into the Folketing in 1915, a general rise in the seats held by women has been observed. In the most recent election in 2022, 78 of 179 seats were held by women.

Sortable and collapsible table
Election year	Female members	Percent change	Percentage of Folketing
1957	15	-	8,4%
1960	17	+13.3%	9,5%
1964	17	+0.0%	9,5%
1966	19	+11.8%	10,6%
1968	19	+0.0%	10,6%
1971	30	+57.9%	16,8%
1973	27	−10.0%	15,1%
1975	28	+3.7%	15,6%
1977	30	+7.1%	16,8%
1979	42	+40.0%	23,5%
1981	42	+0.0%	23,5%
1984	47	+11.9%	26,3%
1987	52	+10.6%	29,1%
1988	52	0.0%	29,1%
1990	59	+13.5%	33,0%
1994	59	+0.0%	33,0%
1998	67	+13.6%	37,4%
2001	68	+1.5%	38,0%
2005	66	−2.9%	36,9%
2007	67	+1.5%	37,4%
2011	70	+4.5%	39,1%
2015	67	−4.3%	37,4%
2019	70	+4.5%	39,1%
2022	78	+11.4%	43,6%
2026	86	+4.4%	48,0%

=== Historical composition ===
Between 1918 and 1920 the Folketing had 140 seats, this was then increased to 149. The number was increased to 179 in 1953, which it remains to this day.

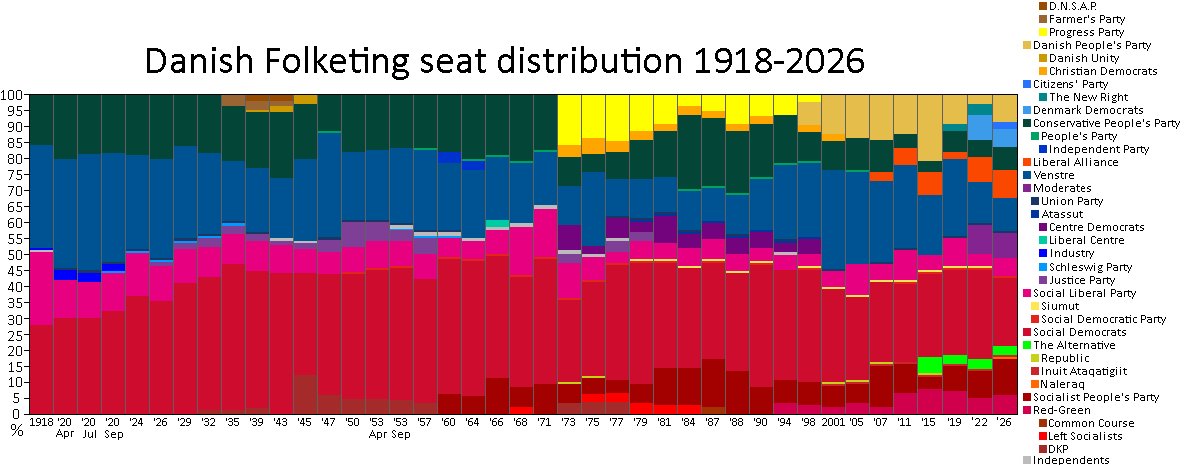

=== Current composition ===
Government (82) Support (20) Opposition (77)

Name		Ideologies	Leader	2026 result		Current seats
Name		Ideologies	Leader	Votes (%)	Seats	Current seats
A	Social Democrats; Socialdemokratiet	Social democracy Left-conservatism	Mette Frederiksen	21.9%	38 / 179	38 / 179
F	Green Left; Socialistisk Folkeparti	Green politics Popular socialism	Pia Olsen Dyhr	11.6%	20 / 179	20 / 179
V	Venstre; Venstre, Danmarks Liberale Parti	Conservative liberalism Agrarianism	Troels Lund Poulsen	10.1%	18 / 179	18 / 179
O	Danish People's Party; Dansk Folkeparti	Danish nationalism National conservatism	Morten Messerschmidt	9.1%	16 / 179	16 / 179
I	Liberal Alliance; Liberal Alliance	Right-libertarianism; Classical liberalism	Alex Vanopslagh	9.4%	16 / 179	15 / 179
M	Moderates; Moderaterne	Liberalism; Centrism	Lars Løkke Rasmussen	7.7%	14 / 179	14 / 179
C	Conservative People's Party; Det Konservative Folkeparti	Green conservatism Liberal conservatism	Mona Juul	7.6%	13 / 179	13 / 179
Ø	Red–Green Alliance; Enhedslisten – De Rød-Grønne	Eco-socialism; Anti-capitalism	Collective leadership Political leader: Pelle Dragsted	6.3%	11 / 179	11 / 179
B	Social Liberals; Det Radikale Venstre	Social liberalism Green politics	Martin Lidegaard	5.8%	10 / 179	10 / 179
Æ	Denmark Democrats; Danmarksdemokraterne	Right-wing populism Anti-immigration	Inger Støjberg	5.8%	10 / 179	10 / 179
Å	The Alternative; Alternativet	Green politics Pro-Europeanism	Franciska Rosenkilde	2.6%	5 / 179	5 / 179
H	Citizens' Party; Borgernes Parti	Right-wing populism Anti-immigration	Lars Boje Mathiesen	2.1%	4 / 179	1 / 179
Ind.	Independent	—N/a		0.1%	0 / 179	4 / 179

== See also ==
- Cabinet of Denmark
- Constituencies in Denmark
- Danish Parliamentary Press Gallery
- Elections in Denmark
- Elections in the Faroe Islands
- Elections in Greenland
- Inatsisartut – Greenland (Parliament)
- Løgting – Faroe Islands (Parliament)
- List of prime ministers of Denmark
