= Emilie Schytte =

Danish politician (born 1993)

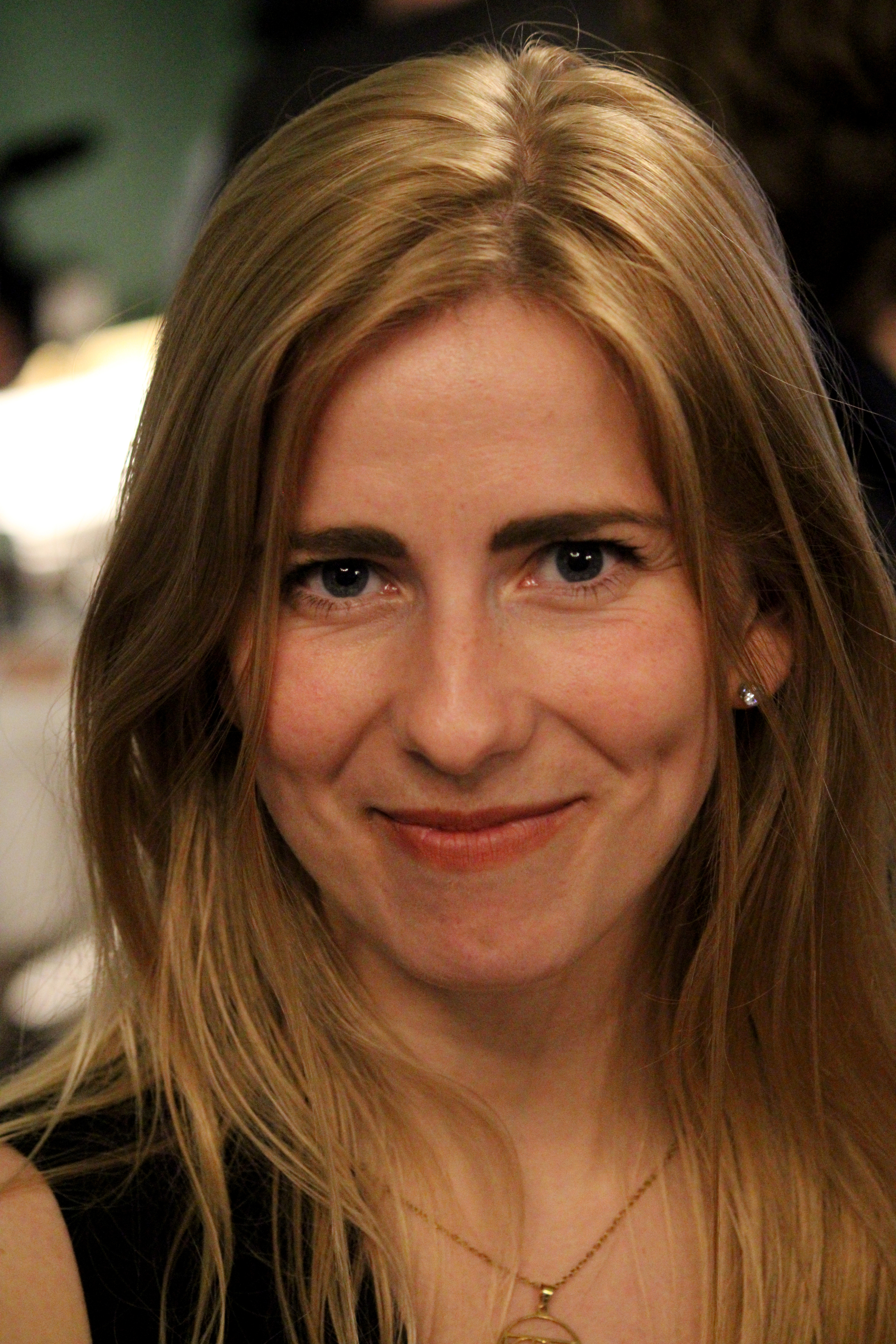
- Schytte in 2026

Member of the Folketing
- Incumbent
- Assumed office 24 March 2026
- Constituency: North Zealand

Personal details
- Born: 6 May 1993 (age 33) Slagelse, Denmark
- Party: Independent (since 2026)
- Other political affiliations: Citizens' Party (2025–2026)
- Education: Copenhagen Business School

Emilie Schytte (born 6 May 1993) is a Danish politician serving as a member of the Folketing since 2026. She was elected as part of the Citizens' Party list but left the party only 11 days after the 2026 election, accusing the party leader Lars Boje Mathiesen of abuse of power and calling the party a 'pyramid scheme'. She later decided to continue in the Folketing as independent.

She previously worked as an artificial intelligence consultant at Roskilde University.

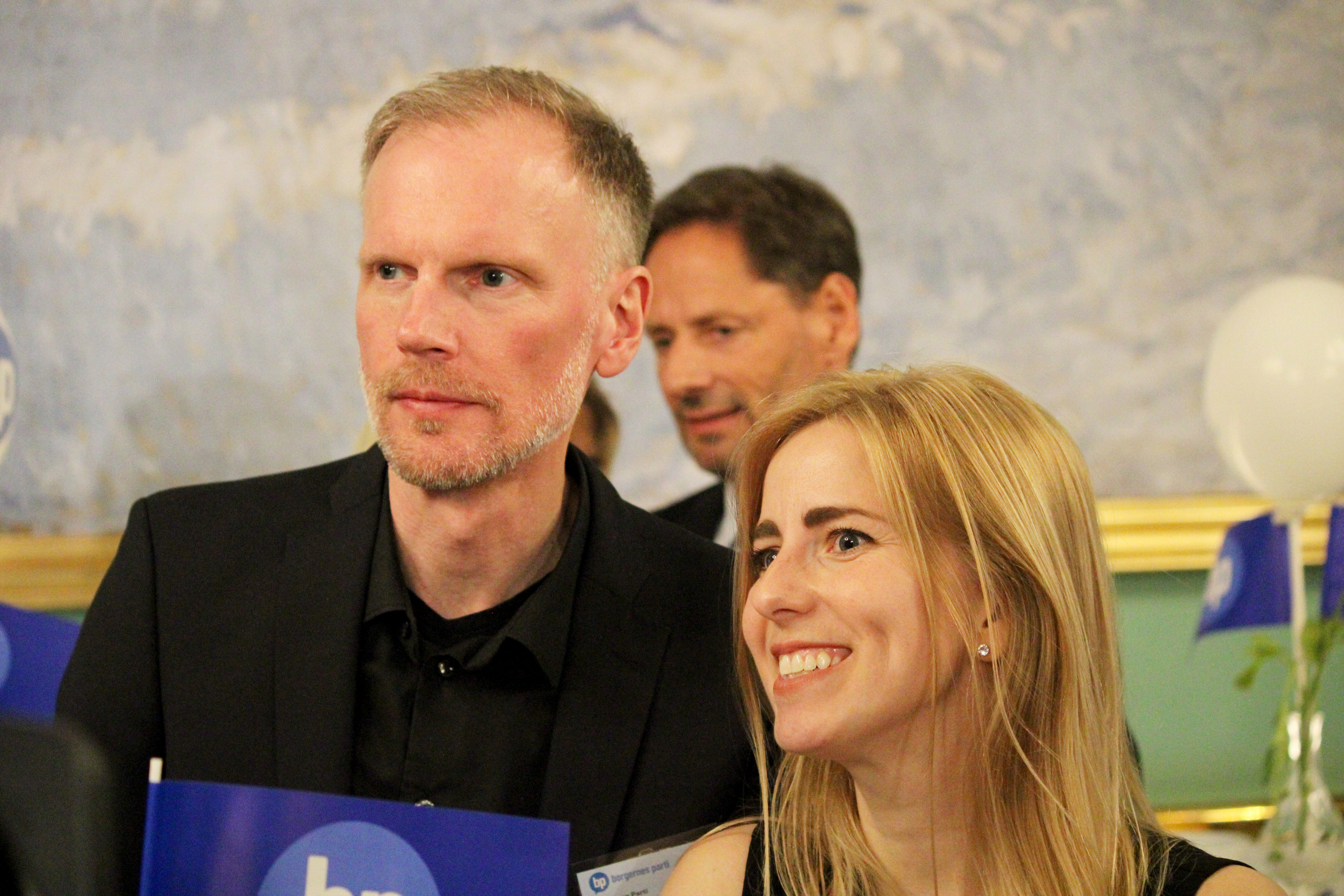
Schytte on election night 2026 with her husband Johan Svensson

Shortly after the 2026 election, she was accused of stating incorrect information on her CV, as she had written that she had taught classes on artificial intelligence at Roskilde University, which the university denied.
