= Citizens' Party (Denmark) =

Political party in Denmark

Citizens' Party Borgernes Parti
- Abbreviation: BP
- Leader: Lars Boje Mathiesen
- Founder: Lars Boje Mathiesen
- Founded: 28 August 2024
- Split from: New Right
- Membership (2025): 700
- Ideology: Right-wing populism Anti-immigration; Anti-Islam
- Political position: Far-right
- Colours: Blue
- Folketing: 1 / 179 (Note: Only 175 of the 179 seats in the Danish Parliament, the Folketing, are obtainable by Danish political parties as Greenland and the Faroe Islands are assigned two seats each due to their status as territories in the Kingdom of Denmark.)
- European Parliament: 0 / 15
- Municipal councils: 1 / 2,436
- Regions: 0 / 205

Election symbol
- H

Website
- borgernesparti.dk

The Citizens' Party – Lars Boje Mathiesen (Danish: Borgernes Parti – Lars Boje Mathiesen, BP) is a far-right populist political party in Denmark. It was established on 28 August 2024 by former Liberal Alliance and New Right politician Lars Boje Mathiesen after his expulsion from the New Right.

== History ==
Mathiesen continued to sit as an independent in the Folketing after his expulsion from the New Right. On 12 April 2023, Boje hinted at the possibility of founding his own party. On 24 June 2024, he planned to announce the party under the name Denmark's Best Party; this name was rejected by the Election Board. On 28 August 2024, the party was officially founded and reached the required 20,195 signatures by 17 December 2024. The party formally obtained ballot access on 15 January 2025, and was assigned the party letter H by the Interior Ministry. As of January 2025, it reported 700 party members.

At the 2026 Danish general election, the party was part of the centre-right to far-right blue bloc, which failed to win a majority, and won 2.1% of the votes and 4 seats. Four days after the election the party excluded recently elected Jacob Harris after accusations of misusing funds from a bankrupt company. 11 days after the election Emilie Schytte decided to leave the party, cutting the party's mandates in half; from 4 to 2. In May 2026, Nadja Natalie Isaksen left as well, leaving party leader Mathiesen as the only MP.

== Ideology and platform ==
The party holds right-wing populist and anti-establishment positions, and is placed at the far-right of the political spectrum. The party is strongly anti-immigration and anti-Islam, and calls for remigration, a far-right concept referring to the ethnic cleansing via mass deportation of non-white minority populations, especially immigrants and sometimes including native-born citizens, to their place of racial ancestry. The party said it wants Denmark to have more referendums and to have a constitutional court. Boje also said his party wants to change the wage structure for public employees, and have the party be a party for motorists, by abolishing the registration fees for cars and replacing it with yearly license plate fee.

The party denies that there is a climate crisis, and questions to what extent humans are the cause of climate change. Upon the establishment of the party, Boje said that he ruled out supporting Mette Frederiksen as Prime Minister of Denmark, citing the 2020 Danish mink cull.

== Election results ==
=== Parliament ===
Election	Leader	Votes	%	Seats	+/-	Government
2026	Lars Boje Mathiesen	75,298	2.13 (#12)	4 / 179	New	Opposition

== See also ==
- List of political parties in Denmark
