= Jacob Brown Harris =

American politician

- Born: January 24, 1830; Winchendon, Massachusetts, U.S.
- Died: February 6, 1875 (aged 45); Boston, Massachusetts, U.S.
- Occupations: Lawyer, politician, legislator

Jacob Brown Harris (January 24, 1830 – February 6, 1875) was an American lawyer and politician who served two terms in the Massachusetts legislature.

== Early life and education ==
Harris, son of Reuben and Rowena (Woodbury) Harris, was born in Winchendon, Massachusetts, on January 24, 1830. He graduated from Yale College in 1854. The year after graduation he spent in Strasburg, Pennsylvania, studying law and teaching. After an interval of more than a year, caused by severe illness, he resumed the study of law in June 1837, with Giles II Whitney, of Winchendon, and was admitted to the Massachusetts bar in 1857.

== Career ==
In 1859, Harris removed to East Abington, Massachusetts (in that portion which is now Rockland), and won for himself a leading position in the Plymouth County Bar. He was for two sessions a member of the Massachusetts legislature; representing Winchendon from 1857 to 1858, and East Abington in 1863. He was a member of Alpha Delta Phi.

== Personal life ==
Harris was married on December 31, 1862, to Mary M. Knight, of Boston, who survived him. Their only son died in infancy. He died in Boston, after many months of suffering, of Bright's disease of the kidneys, on February 6, 1875.
