= 2026 Danish general election =

- 24 March 2026
- All 179 seats in the Folketing; 175 from Denmark proper, 2 from Greenland and 2 from the Faroe Islands; 90 seats needed for a majority
- Turnout: 83.99% (▼0.17pp)
Party	Leader	Vote %	Seats	+/–
Parties in Denmark
Social Democrats	Mette Frederiksen	21.85	38	−12
Green Left	Pia Olsen Dyhr	11.59	20	+5
Venstre	Troels Lund Poulsen	10.14	18	−5
Liberal Alliance	Alex Vanopslagh	9.37	16	+2
DPP	Morten Messerschmidt	9.10	16	+11
Moderates	Lars Løkke Rasmussen	7.68	14	−2
Conservatives	Mona Juul	7.59	13	+3
Red–Green	Pelle Dragsted (Note: Formally, the Red–Green Alliance has collective leadership. See Hoffmann-Hansen, Henrik; Fabricius, Kitte (10 May 2019). "Overblik: Partierne i Danmark". Kristeligt Dagblad (in Danish). Archived from the original on 8 November 2022.)	6.34	11	+2
Social Liberals	Martin Lidegaard	5.82	10	+3
Denmark Democrats	Inger Støjberg	5.75	10	−4
The Alternative	Franciska Rosenkilde	2.58	5	−1
Citizens' Party	Lars Boje Mathiesen	2.13	4	New
Parties in the Faroe Islands
Social Democratic	Aksel V. Johannesen	44.91	1	0
Union	Bárður á Steig Nielsen	25.19	1	0
Parties in Greenland
Inuit Ataqatigiit	Múte Bourup Egede	29.24	1	0
Naleraq	Pele Broberg	25.12	1	+1
This lists parties that won seats. See the complete results below.

Government before	Government after election
Frederiksen II; S–V–M	Frederiksen III; S–SF–M–RV

General elections were held in Denmark on 24 March 2026. All 179 seats in the Folketing were up for election, including 175 in Denmark proper, 2 in Greenland, and 2 in the Faroe Islands (the three entities making up the Danish Realm). It was the first election during Frederik X's reign, who became king in 2024 following the abdication of Margrethe II.

The Social Democrats, which led the outgoing Frederiksen II Cabinet, won the most seats of any party, with 38 seats; however, their vote share of 21.9% was their lowest finish since 1903. Venstre and the Moderates, the two other coalition partners, also lost seats. Among the parties that made significant gains were the Green Left, which became the second-largest party, and the Danish People's Party.

== Background ==
=== Frederiksen II Cabinet ===
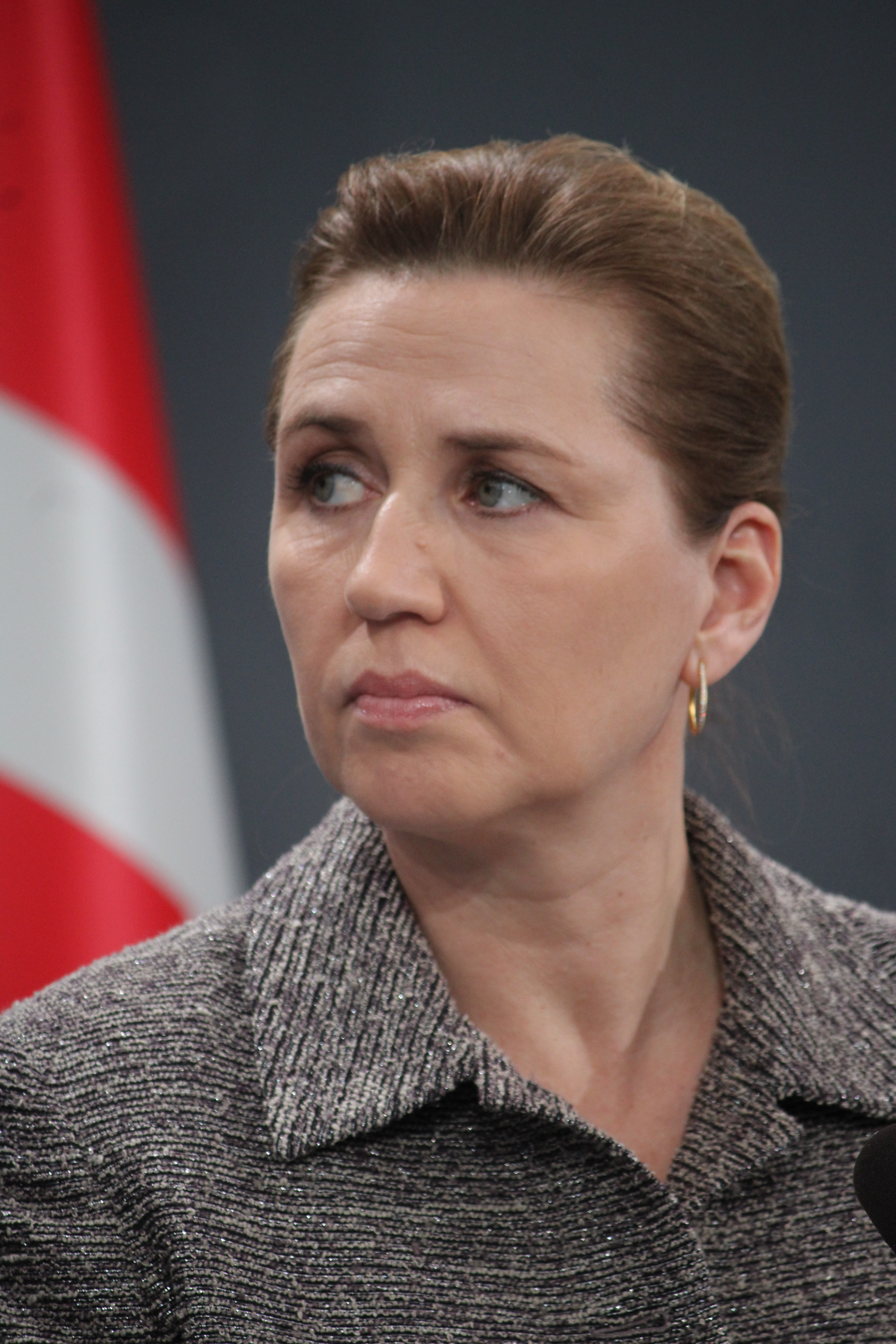
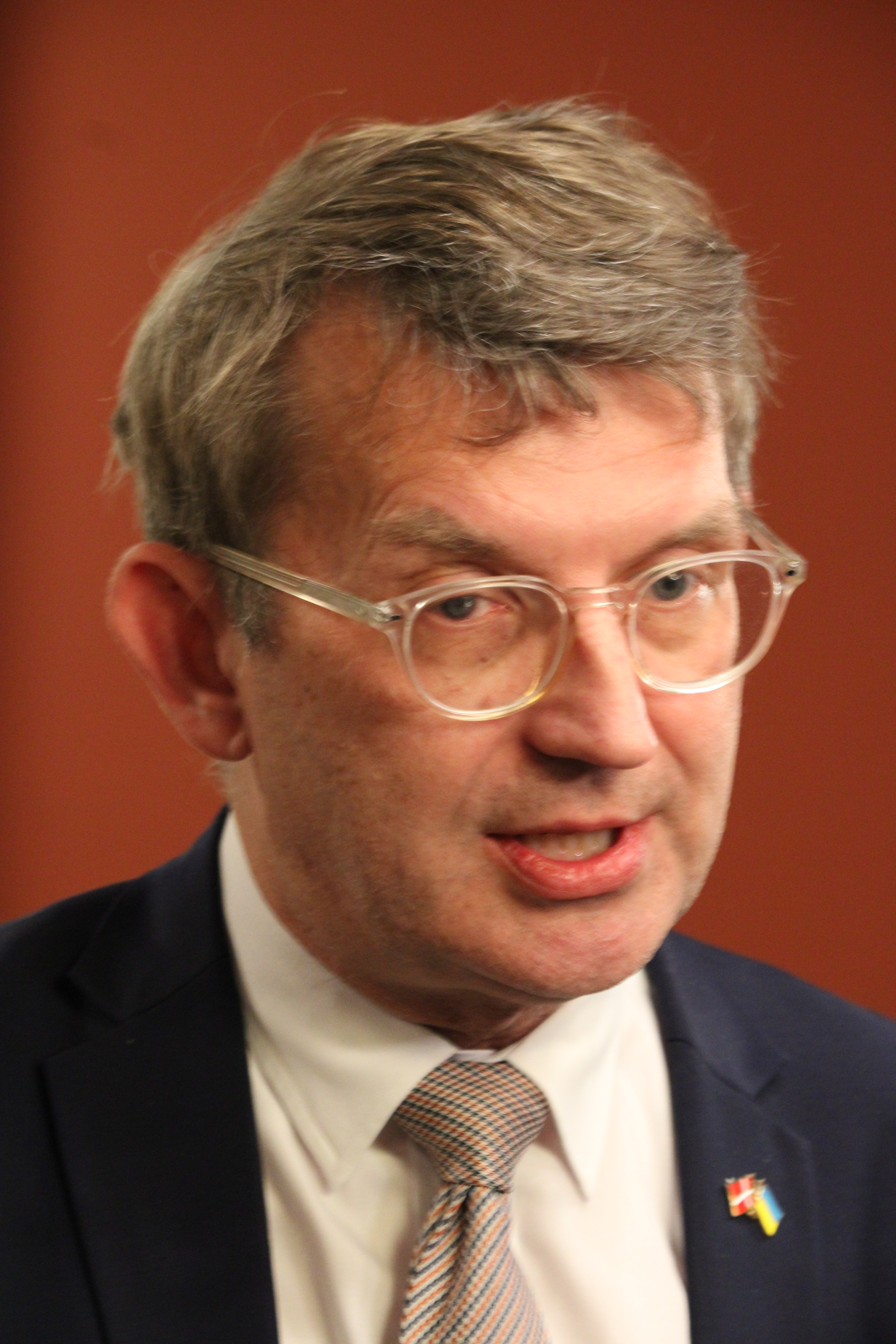
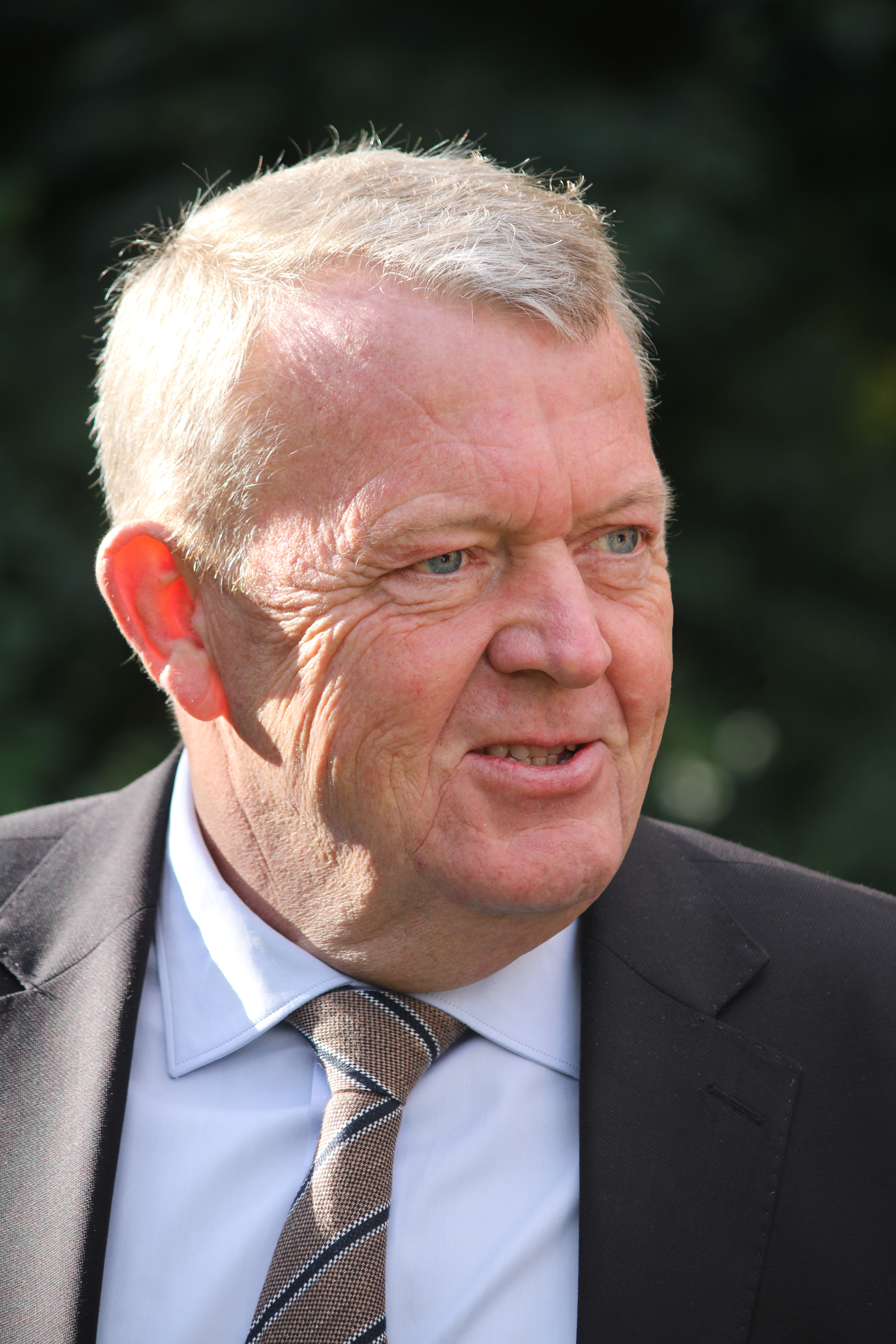
Prime Minister Mette Frederiksen, Defence Minister Troels Lund Poulsen, and Foreign Minister Lars Løkke Rasmussen

The 2022 Danish general election, held on 31 October in the Faroe Islands and on 1 November in Denmark and Greenland, led to a narrow victory for the red bloc. Following the election, a centrist government (Frederiksen II Cabinet), led by Prime Minister Mette Frederiksen and consisting of the Social Democrats (A), Venstre (V) and the Moderates (M), was established.

In the 2025 Danish local elections, the governing parties suffered significant losses, and the Social Democrats lost in Copenhagen after more than 100 years. The governing coalition was thus unpopular going into 2026; however, the role and threats of US President Donald Trump, his proposed United States acquisition of Greenland, and the Greenland crisis affected the decision to hold a snap election. This gave the Social Democrats, and Frederiksen in particular who stood up to Trump, a political boost through the rally 'round the flag effect, as foreign and security issues, in addition to the economy, the cost of living, the environment, and immigration, became significant concerns among voters.

=== Candidates for Prime Minister ===
Frederiksen was initially the only official candidate to become Prime Minister of Denmark. The Red–Green Alliance (Ø) stated that a red bloc coalition had to be proposed if they were to support the Social Democrats. The Green Left (F) won the most votes in the 2024 European parliament election in Denmark, and Pia Olsen Dyhr argued that the largest party in the red bloc should become prime minister. In December 2025, the Red–Green Alliance said that it preferred a Green Left prime minister over a Social Democratic one, although the Green Left did not perceive itself as about to obtain the position.

As multiple early 2024 polls saw the Liberal Alliance (I) being the largest in the blue bloc, political analysts predicted Alex Vanopslagh as a possible Prime Minister candidate. In November 2024, Prime Minister Frederiksen and Danish People's Party (O) leader Morten Messerschmidt commented on their expectation that the former Prime Minister and Moderates leader Lars Løkke Rasmussen could try to regain the position. On 9 December 2025, Citizens' Party leader Lars Boje Mathiesen announced his candidacy for Prime Minister as there was then no official conservative candidate for Prime Minister. However, with the party polling near the 2% threshold, it was considered unlikely that Mathiesen could be Prime Minister.

On 26 February 2026, Venstre leader and defence minister Troels Lund Poulsen officially announced that he was making himself available to lead a blue bloc government and declared his intention to become Prime Minister. In his announcement, Poulsen emphasized national security, economic responsibility, strengthening core welfare services, tightening immigration policy, improving Denmark's competitiveness, and maintaining defence capabilities in response to changing geopolitical conditions. He cited his experience across seven ministerial posts over two decades and stated that he would seek broad parliamentary cooperation if given the mandate to form a government. Already in 2025, the Conservative People's Party (C) and the Danish People's Party had endorsed Poulsen as the preferred Prime Minister candidate of the blue bloc.

== Electoral system ==
Most of the 179 members of the Folketing are elected in Denmark (175). There are four North Atlantic mandates; the Faroe Islands (2), and Greenland (2). The 175 seats in Denmark include 135 seats elected in ten multi-member constituencies of Denmark by proportional representation, using the d'Hondt method (kredsmandater), and 40 leveling seats, allocated to parties in order to address any imbalance in the distribution of the constituency seats (tillægsmandater). The main threshold for levelling seats is 2%.

Distribution of seats for 2026 election
Constituency	Seats	Division	Leveling seats
Copenhagen	17	Capital	12
Greater Copenhagen	11	Capital	12
North Zealand	10	Capital	12
Bornholm	2	Capital	12
Zealand	20	Zealand & Southern Denmark	14
Funen	12	Zealand & Southern Denmark	14
South Jutland	17	Zealand & Southern Denmark	14
East Jutland	19	Mid & Northern; Jutland	14
West Jutland	13	Mid & Northern; Jutland	14
North Jutland	14	Mid & Northern; Jutland	14
Faroe Islands	2		
Greenland	2		

== Campaign ==
=== Announcement ===
The election campaign began on 26 February 2026, when Prime Minister Frederiksen announced that the election had been called.

=== Pig farming issue ===
Four national animal welfare and environmental NGOs, (Note: Animal Protection Denmark, the Danish Society for Nature Conservation, Greenpeace Denmark and the National Association against Pig Factories) together with four left-wing parties, formed the Alliance for a Pig Election (Danish: Alliancen for et grisevalg), gaining support from Frederiksen and even parts of the right-wing to address problems with the pig farming industry in Denmark, the sixth-largest pork exporter in the world. These include practices of excessive breeding and tail removal for the pigs, as well as the runoff of nitrate into the water supply of people living near these particularly intensive farms.

After the election, the new government pledged to end the extreme breeding and routine tail docking of pigs, to give them more space to move, and to reduce the nitrate limit in drinking water by 88%. The Ministry of Food, Agriculture, and Fisheries was also dissolved and the agricultural portfolio set to be delegated to five other ministries, including the newly-formed Ministry of Nature and Animal Welfare. Britta Riis, director of Animal Protection Denmark, attributes the "pig election" campaign's success partly to the greater focus on simple animal welfare arguments as opposed to more complicated financial ones.

=== Political parties ===
The table's below lists parties represented in the Folketing

=== Denmark ===
Name		Ideologies	Leader	2022 result		Seats at dissolution
Name		Ideologies	Leader	Votes (%)	Seats	Seats at dissolution
A	Social Democrats; Socialdemokratiet	Social democracy	Mette Frederiksen	27.54%	50 / 179	50 / 179
V	Venstre; Venstre, Danmarks Liberale Parti	Conservative liberalism; Agrarianism (Nordic)	Troels Lund Poulsen	13.31%	23 / 179	23 / 179
M	Moderates; Moderaterne	Liberalism; Centrism	Lars Løkke Rasmussen	9.27%	16 / 179	12 / 179
F	Green Left; Socialistisk Folkeparti	Green politics; Popular socialism	Pia Olsen Dyhr	8.29%	15 / 179	15 / 179
Æ	Denmark Democrats; Danmarksdemokraterne	Right-wing populism; Anti-immigration	Inger Støjberg	8.08%	14 / 179	16 / 179
I	Liberal Alliance; Liberal Alliance	Right-libertarianism; Classical liberalism	Alex Vanopslagh	7.87%	14 / 179	15 / 179
C	Conservative People's Party; Det Konservative Folkeparti	Green conservatism Liberal conservatism	Mona Juul	5.51%	10 / 179	10 / 179
Ø	Red–Green Alliance; Enhedslisten – De Rød-Grønne	Eco-socialism; Anti-capitalism	Collective leadership Political spokesperson: Pelle Dragsted	5.16%	9 / 179	9 / 179
B	Social Liberals; Det Radikale Venstre	Social liberalism	Martin Lidegaard	3.79%	7 / 179	6 / 179
Å	The Alternative; Alternativet	Green politics; Pro-Europeanism	Franciska Rosenkilde	3.33%	6 / 179	6 / 179
O	Danish People's Party; Dansk Folkeparti	Danish nationalism; National conservatism; Anti-immigration	Morten Messerschmidt	2.63%	5 / 179	7 / 179
H	Citizens' Party; Borgernes Parti	Right-wing populism; Anti-immigration; Anti-Islam	Lars Boje Mathiesen	—N/a		1 / 179
Ind.	Independent	—N/a		0.12%	0 / 179	5 / 179

=== Faroe Islands ===
Name		Ideologies	Leader	2022 result		Seats at dissolution
Name		Ideologies	Leader	Votes (%)	Seats	Seats at dissolution
SP	Union Party; Sambandsflokkurin	Conservative liberalism	Bárður á Steig Nielsen	30.19%	1 / 179	1 / 179
JF	Social Democratic Party; Javnaðarflokkurin	Social democracy	Aksel V. Johannesen	28.20%	1 / 179	1 / 179

=== Greenland ===
Name		Ideologies	Leader	2022 result		Seats at dissolution
Name		Ideologies	Leader	Votes (%)	Seats	Seats at dissolution
SIU	Forward; Siumut	Social democracy	Erik Jensen	38.58%	1 / 179	0 / 179
IA	Community of the People; Inuit Ataqatigiit	Democratic socialism	Múte Bourup Egede	25.21%	1 / 179	1 / 179
N	Point of Orientation; Naleraq	Populism	Pele Broberg	12.6%	0 / 179	1 / 179

=== Slogans ===
Party	Original slogan	English translation
Social Democrats	Vi har et ansvar for hinanden	We have a responsibility to each other
Social Liberals	Der er brug for en plan B	There is a need for a plan B
Conservatives	Borgerlige stemmer der arbejder	Non-socialist (lit. 'bourgeois') votes that work
Green Left	En sikker rød og grøn stemme	A safe red and green vote
Citizens' Party	Magten tilbage til borgerne	Power back to the citizens
Liberal Alliance	En frisk start	A fresh start
Moderates	Samler – når andre splitter	Unites – when others divide
Danish People's Party	Skal vi gøre noget ved det?	Should we do something about it?
Venstre	Danmark i sikre hænder	Denmark in safe hands
Denmark Democrats	Et Danmark i bedre balance	A Denmark in better balance
Red–Green Alliance	Et Danmark du har råd til	A Denmark you can afford
The Alternative	Vi vil give håbet på fremtiden tilbage	We will give back the hope for the future

=== Debates ===
2026 Danish general election debates
Date	Time	Organizers	Venue	P Present I Invitee N Non-invitee S Surrogate												
Date	Time	Organizers	Venue	A	B	C	F	H	I	M	O	V	Æ	Ø	Å	Refs
26 Feb	20:00	DR and TV 2	DR Byen	P Frederiksen	P Lidegaard	P Juul	P Olsen Dyhr	P Boje Mathiesen	P Vanopslagh	P Rasmussen	P Messerschmidt	P Lund Poulsen	P Støjberg	P Dragsted	P Rosenkilde	
3 Mar	13.00	TV 2 Østjylland	Aarhus Universitet	S Wammen	S Robsøe	P Juul	S Andersen	P Boje Mathiesen	P Vanopslagh	S Egelund	S Zimmermann	S Bressum	S Skibby	S Mach	S Gejl	
8 Mar	20:00	TV 2	Storms Pakhus, Odense	P Frederiksen	N	N	N	N	N	N	N	P Lund Poulsen	N	N	N	
10 Mar	20:00	TV 2	Horsens Statsfængsel, Horsens	N	P Lidegaard	P Juul	P Olsen Dyhr	N	N	N	N	S Løhde	P Støjberg	N	P Rosenkilde	
15 Mar	21:00	DR	DR Byen	P Frederiksen	N	N	N	N	N	N	N	P Lund Poulsen	N	N	N	
17 Mar	20:00	TV 2	RemisenBrande, Brande	S Tesfaye	N	N	N	P Boje Mathiesen	P Vanopslagh	S Engel-Schmidt	P Messerschmidt	N	N	P Dragsted	N	
22 Mar	21:00	DR	DR Koncerthuset	P Frederiksen	P Lidegaard	P Juul	P Olsen Dyhr	P Boje Mathiesen	P Vanopslagh	P Rasmussen	P Messerschmidt	P Lund Poulsen	P Støjberg	P Dragsted	P Rosenkilde	
23 Mar	20:00	TV 2	Christiansborg Palace	P Frederiksen	P Lidegaard	P Juul	P Olsen Dyhr	P Boje Mathiesen	P Vanopslagh	P Rasmussen	P Messerschmidt	P Lund Poulsen	P Støjberg	P Dragsted	P Rosenkilde	

== Results ==
Election results by bloc Red bloc: 86 seats Neither: 15 seats Blue bloc: 78 seats

Party	Votes	%	Seats	+/–
Denmark proper
Social Democrats	779,252	21.84	38	–12
Green Left	413,306	11.58	20	+5
Venstre	361,689	10.14	18	–5
Liberal Alliance	334,421	9.37	16	+2
Danish People's Party	324,518	9.10	16	+11
Moderates	274,775	7.70	14	–2
Conservative People's Party	270,749	7.59	13	+3
Red–Green Alliance	226,037	6.34	11	+2
Danish Social Liberal Party	207,442	5.81	10	+3
Denmark Democrats	205,302	5.75	10	–4
The Alternative	91,770	2.57	5	–1
Citizens' Party	75,928	2.13	4	+4
Independents	2,436	0.07	0	0
Total	3,567,625	100.00	175	0
Valid votes	3,567,625	98.71		
Invalid votes	9,050	0.25		
Blank votes	37,597	1.04		
Total votes	3,614,272	100.00		
Registered voters/turnout	4,303,429	83.99		
Source: dst.dk, dr.dk
Faroe Islands
Social Democratic Party	13,088	44.91	1	0
Union Party	7,342	25.19	1	0
People's Party	4,383	15.04	0	0
Republic	3,891	13.35	0	0
Centre Party	437	1.50	0	0
Total	29,141	100.00	2	0
Valid votes	29,141	99.13		
Invalid votes	69	0.23		
Blank votes	188	0.64		
Total votes	29,398	100.00		
Registered voters/turnout	38,955	75.47		
Source: kvf.fo
Greenland
Inuit Ataqatigiit	6,133	29.24	1	0
Naleraq	5,268	25.12	1	+1
Democrats	3,767	17.96	0	0
Siumut	3,515	16.76	0	–1
Atassut	2,290	10.92	0	0
Total	20,973	100.00	2	0
Valid votes	20,973	97.88		
Invalid votes	158	0.74		
Blank votes	297	1.39		
Total votes	21,428	100.00		
Registered voters/turnout	40,952	52.32		
Source: qinersineq.gl

=== Voter demographics ===
Sociology of the electorate
Demographic	Ø	Å	F	A	B	M	V	C	I	Æ	BP	O	Red	Blue	None
Total vote	6.3%	2.6%	11.6%	21.9%	5.8%	7.7%	10.1%	7.6%	9.4%	5.8%	2.1%	9.1%	48.2%	44.1%	7.7%
Gender
Male	5.5%	2.3%	9.2%	17.5%	4.8%	8.5%	11.5%	7.9%	12.8%	6.4%	2.4%	11.2%	39.3%	52.2%	8.5%
Female	7.0%	2.9%	14.0%	26.0%	6.7%	6.9%	8.8%	7.3%	6.1%	5.2%	1.8%	7.0%	56.6%	36.2%	6.9%
Age
18-34	11.1%	4.6%	12.7%	9.1%	11.2%	4.7%	7.9%	7.5%	16.3%	2.3%	1.4%	11.2%	48.7%	46.6%	4.7%
35+	4.6%	1.9%	11.2%	26.4%	3.9%	8.7%	10.9%	7.6%	7.0%	7.0%	2.3%	8.4%	48.0%	43.2%	8.7%

== Aftermath ==
=== Defections and party expulsions ===
Four days after the election, two members of the Folketing became independents: Cecilie Liv Hansen, who was elected as a member of the Liberal Alliance, and was expelled following revelations that she gave the party "false information on her personal life", and Jacob Harris, elected as a member of the Citizens' Party, who was accused of misusing funds from a bankrupt company before temporarily taking leave and subsequently being excluded from the party. On 4 April 2026, another Citizens' Party member became an independent, accusing Lars Boje Mathiesen of abuse of power and leaving the party of her own accord. Nadja Natalie Isaksen left the Citizens' Party at the beginning of May 2026, expressing her disappointment in the party and saying, in a post on Facebook, "[...] unfortunately, the Citizens' Party hasn't been what many of us were hoping for and fighting for."

=== Analysis and reactions ===
Exit polls and early results showed that the Social Democrats remained the most voted party but that Prime Minister Frederiksen lacked a clear majority; at 21.9%, it was the party's worst result since the 1903 Danish Folketing election. The two other governing parties also suffered losses, with the incumbent government losing its majority; as a result and as is customary, Frederiksen took a caretaker government role and resigned. The Moderates favoured a centrist government with the Social Democrats, while Venstre preferred a government with the blue bloc and opposed participation in another government led by the Social Democrats. The red bloc won a plurality of seats but failed to secure a majority. Despite failing to obtain a majority, one analysis of the result was that the left-leaning parties showed a positive trend in Europe where "standing up to Trump-style politics" or to Trump himself can be a "winning strategy", with Frederiksen favoured to win a third term. The Green Left gained five seats, becoming the second-largest party in the Folketing with 20 seats. Party leader Pia Olsen Dyhr said of the party's "historic" success that the Danish people had provided it with a mandate and she was "ready to negotiate"; however, she made it clear that if welfare and the green transition were not prioritised, the party would remain in opposition. The Danish People's Party tripled its share of the vote.

=== Coalition talks ===
Election results concluded with neither the red or blue bloc getting a majority and the Moderates (the junior partner of the incumbent government) becoming a potential kingmaker. Conversations to start coalition talks opened on 25 March 2026. Venstre have ruled out a continuation of a government with the Social Democrats, while the Moderates favoured a continuation of a centrist government with the Social Democrats. A formateur would first need to be appointed by King Frederik X, following consultations with all parties, to lead negotiations and determine which parties can form a coalition. Frederiksen stated that if she is tasked, she would look to form a coalition with left-leaning parties, possibly with the Green Left and the centrist Social Liberals, that could potentially be supported by the Moderates and possibly also the Conservatives, who expressed willingness and have not ruled out negotiations to support Frederiksen, which would bring the coalition to a majority.

== Government formation ==
Possible governments	Seats
Total seats	179
Governments with a majority (90 or more seats)
V–I–O–M–C–B–Æ	97
A–F–M–C–B	95
A–V–M–C–B	93
Governments without a majority (89 or fewer seats)
A–F–Ø–B–Å	84
A–F–M–B	82
A–F–M	72
A–F–B	68
V–I–M–C	61
V–I–C	47
A	38

=== First round ===
With both red bloc and blue bloc short of a majority, the Moderates emerged as potential kingmakers. On 25 March, following the announcement of the election results, the parties submitted their recommendations for who should be the formateur. Frederiksen was announced as formateur later that day.

King's Round on 25 March
Party	Party leader	Seats	Recommended
Social Democrats	Mette Frederiksen	38	Frederiksen
Green Left	Pia Olsen Dyhr	20	Frederiksen
Venstre	Troels Lund Poulsen	18	Poulsen
Liberal Alliance	Alex Vanopslagh	16	Poulsen
Danish People's Party	Morten Messerschmidt	16	Poulsen
Moderates	Lars Løkke Rasmussen	14	Rasmussen
Conservative	Mona Juul	13	Poulsen
Red–Green	Pelle Dragsted	11	Frederiksen
Social Liberal	Martin Lidegaard	10	Frederiksen
Denmark Democrats	Inger Støjberg	10	Poulsen
The Alternative	Franciska Rosenkilde	5	Frederiksen
Citizens' Party	Lars Boje Mathiesen	4	No one
Faroese Social Democratic	Aksel V. Johannesen	1	Frederiksen
Recommendations for Formateur
Social Democrats	Mette Frederiksen	74	
Venstre	Troels Lund Poulsen	73	
Moderates	Lars Løkke Rasmussen	14	

On 25 March 2026, King Frederik X requested Prime Minister Frederiksen, after being appointed as formateur, to lead negotiations with the Green Left and the Social Liberals to try to form a coalition. Frederiksen said she favoured a coalition with the five red-bloc parties and called it the "most realistic option", which would consist of the Social Democrats, Green Left, Red–Green Alliance, Social Liberals, and Alternative, with the Moderates joining in as well. While this is mathematically possible, the Moderates leader Rasmussen is not in favour of backing a red-bloc or a blue-bloc government and prefers a compromise on parties from both blocs; it remained unclear if he would accept negotiations to back solely a red-bloc government or a blue-bloc government. Throughout the election period, Rasmussen had ruled out forming a government that includes the Red–Green Alliance or one that includes the Danish People's Party.

On 31 March 2026, the MP-elect from the Faroese Social Democratic Party, Sjúrður Skaale endorsed Frederiksen for the Prime Minister post. It was also reported that Greenland's two elected MPs, Naaja Nathanielsen from Inuit Ataqatigiit and Qarsoq Høegh-Dam from Naleraq are also participating in coalition talks with Frederiksen and are seeking more Greenlandic autonomy on foreign policy, following U.S. President Donald Trump's repeated threats to annex the territory.

On 10 April 2026, it was reported that Rasmussen had put a block on future coalition negotiations involving a centre-left government, which would have been dependent on the Red-Green Alliance, putting a "pause" on such government formation, after yielding little success. The reasoning behind this was reportedly disagreements on economic policy and he described a government involving the Red-Green Alliance as "irresponsible and therefore impossible". Rasmussen declared he preferred a coalition involving two red parties (Social Democrats and Social Liberals), two blue parties (Venstre and Conservatives), and his own Moderates in the next government, that would be formed "around the centre", which mathematically would give them a majority.

Rasmussen said he was willing to still negotiate with Frederiksen as formateur, but on the condition that she invite Venstre for talks, who had previously ruled out working with her, but later appeared to have softened their stance on forming a government with Frederiksen, based on the Venstre's deputy chairman, Stephanie Lose's recent interview, where she appeared a "little more open for talks", as well as the Conservatives, who said they were willing to negotiate with Frederiksen. However, it was reported that talks on forming a centre-left government backed by the Red-Green Alliance can proceed and may be revisited in the future, if talks with the blue-parties fail, indicating that Rasmussen will be testing to see, if Venstre are willing to compromise, similar to the pressure, that he applied on the Social Democrats. Rasmussen stated that after he gave his ultimatum on future talks, he was given the impression that Frederiksen was reaching out to Venstre and Conservatives to invite them for talks.

Following Rasmussen's announcement, the leader of Venstre, Troels Lund Poulsen called on Rasmussen to form a centre-right government without the Social Democrats and with the blue-bloc parties instead, where economic issues can align, which was followed by Conservative leader Mona Juul stating she was seeking for Rasmussen to give "the blues' a chance" on forming a coalition. However, Rasmussen indicated he does not intend to go that route and instead interpreted Poulsen's statements as a sign of willingness to negotiate, in broader context.

After Rasmussen's announcement, Frederiksen met with red-bloc parties for negotiations and there was a clear split stance on how the government should be formed. While it was not their first preference, the Social Democrats and the Social Liberals left the door open and expressed willingness to negotiate such government formation, while the leaders of the Green-Left, Red-Green Alliance, and Alternative remained optimistic and positive that a centre-left government with the Moderates can be formed, but said they would not join any government involving Venstre and Conservatives. Later that day, Venstre confirmed they would attend the talks, as well as the Conservatives.

=== Second round ===
On 8 May, Rasmussen put forward Troels Lund Poulsen as the new formateur, stating that "We need to have a change of direction, if there needs to be progress made." He however did not exclude the possibility of supporting Frederiksen as prime minister, and after his decision, many blue bloc parties once again endorsed Poulsen as formateur, while the Danish People's Party reaffirmed that they would not support any government with Rasmussen's party, the Moderates in it. The negotiating left-wing parties stated their disappointment in Rasmussen's choice to look at Poulsen as formateur, yet expressed willingness to negotiate again if Rasmussen went back to the left wing parties. Frederiksen, with no possible government left to form without the Moderates, met with the king at Amalienborg and a new King's Round was initiated, where each party would again submit who they think should be formateur.

Later during the evening, Poulsen was confirmed to be the next formateur, effectively restarting government negotiations. Poulsen confirmed that government negotiations would resume on 11 May, and would invite all parties while also acknowledging that it seems like a difficult task, but excited to negotiate.

King's Round on 8 May
Party	Party leader	Seats	Recommended
Social Democrats	Mette Frederiksen	38	Frederiksen
Green Left	Pia Olsen Dyhr	20	Frederiksen
Venstre	Troels Lund Poulsen	18	Poulsen
Danish People's Party	Morten Messerschmidt	16	Poulsen
Liberal Alliance	Alex Vanopslagh	15	Poulsen
Moderates	Lars Løkke Rasmussen	14	Poulsen
Conservative	Mona Juul	13	Poulsen
Red–Green	Pelle Dragsted	11	Frederiksen
Social Liberal	Martin Lidegaard	10	Frederiksen
Denmark Democrats	Inger Støjberg	10	Poulsen
The Alternative	Franciska Rosenkilde	5	Frederiksen
Citizens' Party	Lars Boje Mathiesen	1	Poulsen

=== Third round ===
On 22 May, it was reported that Poulsen had failed to create a centre-right government with the Moderates and the blue-bloc parties, after the Moderates refused to back the minority government, leading to negotiations breaking down. While agreeing on policies like on development aid and economic policy, the reasoning for the talks collapsing was due to the heavy reliance on the far-right Danish People's Party and also for "sidelining" Rasmussen's Moderates from joining, preventing any centrist influence on the next government, which was a key Moderate concession that Rasmussen wanted met in exchange for support. Poulsen proposed a minority government, which would have included only his party, the Conservatives, and the Liberal Alliance. The Minister of Higher Education and Science Christina Egelund also commented and was disappointed by Venstre's lack of response on certain policies like on immigration policy and was upset that Venstre seemed to be "yielding" on setting the tone of the next government to the Danish People's Party and stated questions were not answered on if the Store bededag holiday will be reinstated, whether the Quran law will be repealed, the proposal for a net emigration of Muslims (a concession demanded by the Danish People's Party), and how a number of political priorities for a new centre-right government would be financed. After Poulsen's announcement, Rasmussen voiced his support for Frederiksen to become the formateur again and she was re-appointed on 23 May after meeting with King Frederik X, securing the support from the Moderates and the red-bloc parties. After confirmation, Frederiksen voiced her support for negotiations to form a centre-left coalition with her party, the Green Left, the Moderates, and the Social Liberals, that would be backed by the Red-Green Alliance and Alternative. Talks were restarted on 24 May.

On 2 June, following negotiations with the parties, Frederiksen announced the formation of a minority government of her party, Dyhr's Green Left, Rasmussen's Moderates, and Lidegaard's Social Liberals. The government will primarily receive support from Dragsted's Red-Green Alliance and Rosenkilde's Alternative, but may seek support from other parties on different issues. The announcement stated that the government's platform would be presented on 2 June and the names of the ministers would be announced on 3 June.

King's Round on 23 May
Party	Party leader	Seats	Recommended
Social Democrats	Mette Frederiksen	38	Frederiksen
Green Left	Pia Olsen Dyhr	20	Frederiksen
Venstre	Troels Lund Poulsen	18	Poulsen
Danish People's Party	Morten Messerschmidt	16	Poulsen
Liberal Alliance	Alex Vanopslagh	15	Poulsen
Moderates	Lars Løkke Rasmussen	14	Frederiksen
Conservative	Mona Juul	13	Poulsen
Red–Green	Pelle Dragsted	11	Frederiksen
Social Liberal	Martin Lidegaard	10	Frederiksen
Denmark Democrats	Inger Støjberg	10	Poulsen
The Alternative	Franciska Rosenkilde	5	Frederiksen
Citizens' Party	Lars Boje Mathiesen	1	No one

== See also ==
- 2026 Faroese general election, held two days afterwards in the Faroe Islands
