= Jacob Harris (politician) =

Danish politician (born 1986)

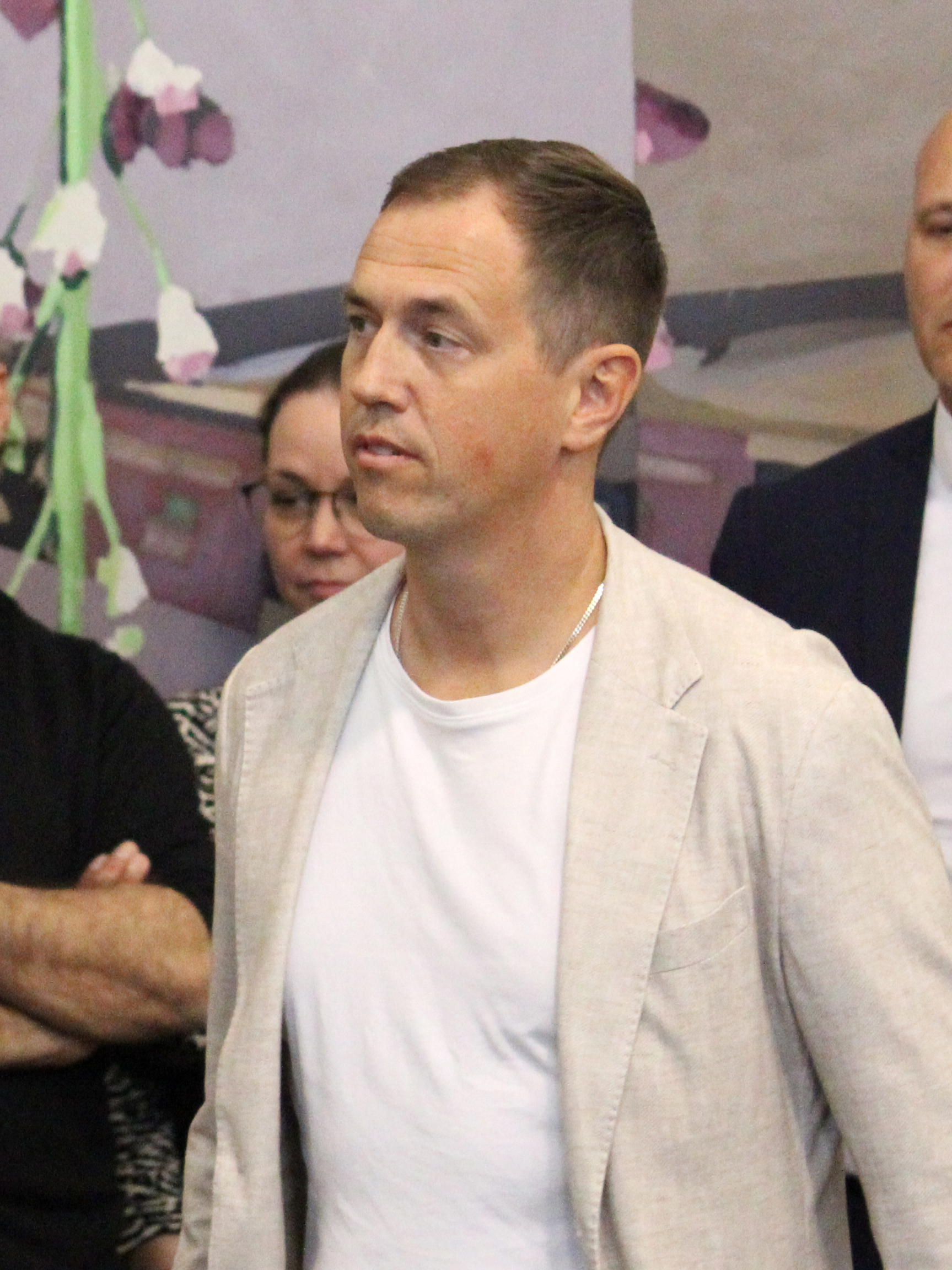
- Harris (2026)

Member of the Folketing
- Incumbent
- Assumed office 24 March 2026
- Constituency: Zealand Constituency

Personal details
- Born: Jacob Harris Nielsen; 13 January 1986 (age 40)
- Party: Independent (since 2026)
- Other political affiliations: Social Democrats (2021–2025); Citizens' Party (2025–2026)

Jacob Harris Nielsen (born 13 January 1986) is a Danish politician and member of the Danish Folketing. He was elected on behalf of the Citizens' Party at the 2026 Danish general election in the Zealand Constituency. He received 2,307 personal votes.

Two days after the election he went on leave from the Folketing after being accused of misusing funds from a bankrupt company by the Danish newspaper Finans. Four days after the election he was excluded from the party. Afterwards he chose to cancel his leave and return to the parliament.

He has previously been a member of the Danish Social Democratic Party, and in 2021 he ran for the 2021 Danish local elections in Høje-Taastrup Municipality.

He has previously worked as a plumber and been involved in the Danish labour union Dansk Metal. A week after the election he was reported to the police in a case about construction fraud.
