= Funen (Folketing constituency) =

Constituency of the Folketing, the national legislature of Denmark

- Fyn
- Constituency for the Folketing
- Location of Funen within Denmark
- Municipality: List: Ærø; Assens; Faaborg-Midtfyn; Kerteminde; Langeland; Middelfart; Nordfyn; Nyborg; Odense; Svendborg
- Region: Southern Denmark
- Population: 510,003 (2026)
- Electorate: 380,905 (2026)
- Area: 3,481 km^{2} (2022)

Current constituency
- Created: 2007
- Seats: 12 (2007–present)
- Members of the Folketing: List: Kim Aas (A); Alex Ahrendtsen (O); Sara Emil Baaring (A); Mikkel Bjørn (O); Erling Bonnesen (V); Trine Bramsen (A); Bjørn Brandenborg (A); Jens Henrik Thulesen Dahl (Æ); Katrine Daugaard (I); Rosa Eriksen (M); Karsten Hønge (F); Thomas Skriver Jensen (A); Dan Jørgensen (A); Lars Christian Lilleholt (V); Mai Mercado (C); Victoria Velasquez (Ø)
- Created from: Funen County

Funen (Danish: Fyn) is one of the 12 multi-member constituencies of the Folketing, the national legislature of Denmark. The constituency was established in 2007 following the public administration structural reform. It consists of the municipalities of Ærø, Assens, Faaborg-Midtfyn, Kerteminde, Langeland, Middelfart, Nordfyn, Nyborg, Odense and Svendborg. The constituency currently elects 12 of the 179 members of the Folketing using the open party-list proportional representation electoral system. At the 2026 general election it had 380,905 registered electors.

== Electoral system ==
Funen currently elects 12 of the 179 members of the Folketing using the open party-list proportional representation electoral system. Constituency seats are allocated using the D'Hondt method. Compensatory seats are calculated based on the national vote and are allocated using the Sainte-Laguë method, initially at the provincial level and finally at the constituency level. Only parties that reach any one of three thresholds stipulated by section 77 of the Folketing (Parliamentary) Elections Act - winning at least one constituency seat; obtaining at least the Hare quota (valid votes in province/number of constituency seats in province) in two of the three provinces; or obtaining at least 2% of the national vote - compete for compensatory seats.

== Election results ==
=== Summary ===
Election	Red–Green Ø			Green Left F			Alternative Å			Social Democrats A			Social Liberals B			Venstre V			Conservative People's C			Liberal Alliance I / Y			Danish People's O		
Election	Votes	%	Seats	Votes	%	Seats	Votes	%	Seats	Votes	%	Seats	Votes	%	Seats	Votes	%	Seats	Votes	%	Seats	Votes	%	Seats	Votes	%	Seats
2026	19,043	6.06%	1	38,746	12.34%	2	6,975	2.22%	0	82,183	26.17%	4	13,804	4.40%	0	31,723	10.10%	1	21,827	6.95%	1	26,396	8.41%	1	27,111	8.63%	1
2022	14,487	4.65%	0	25,525	8.20%	1	8,476	2.72%	0	101,064	32.45%	6	9,305	2.99%	0	36,742	11.80%	2	16,190	5.20%	0	19,992	6.42%	1	8,023	2.58%	0
2019	21,182	6.78%	1	20,961	6.71%	1	9,505	3.04%	0	94,337	30.18%	4	22,793	7.29%	1	73,046	23.37%	3	19,256	6.16%	1	5,867	1.88%	0	27,746	8.88%	1
2015	26,575	8.51%	1	13,790	4.42%	0	14,165	4.54%	0	90,061	28.86%	4	10,513	3.37%	0	56,673	18.16%	3	10,849	3.48%	0	20,271	6.49%	1	67,913	21.76%	3
2011	19,914	6.31%	1	32,990	10.45%	1				89,577	28.38%	4	26,658	8.45%	1	76,845	24.34%	3	16,033	5.08%	0	13,164	4.17%	0	38,978	12.35%	2
2007	5,446	1.76%	0	43,258	13.97%	2				83,395	26.93%	4	15,554	5.02%	0	66,198	21.38%	3	41,225	13.31%	1	7,476	2.41%	0	45,843	14.80%	2

(Excludes compensatory seats)

=== Detailed ===
==== 2026 ====
Results of the 2026 general election held on 24 March 2026:

Party		Votes per nomination district								Total Votes	%	Seats		
Party		Assens	Faa- borg	Middel- fart	Nyborg	Odense East	Odense South	Odense West	Svend- borg	Total Votes	%	Con.	Com.	Tot.
Social Democrats	A	6,759	10,041	11,316	9,689	9,618	10,733	10,409	13,618	82,183	26.17%	4	0	4
Green Left	F	2,753	3,965	4,524	4,396	6,185	5,891	5,569	5,463	38,746	12.34%	2	0	2
Venstre	V	3,180	4,036	5,840	3,427	2,863	4,688	3,577	4,112	31,723	10.10%	1	1	2
Danish People's Party	O	2,494	3,594	4,073	3,573	3,209	3,218	3,350	3,600	27,111	8.63%	1	0	1
Liberal Alliance	I	2,163	2,650	3,875	2,950	3,351	4,449	3,644	3,314	26,396	8.41%	1	0	1
Moderates	M	1,678	2,822	3,495	2,604	2,633	4,386	3,005	3,277	23,900	7.61%	1	0	1
Conservative People's Party	C	1,327	2,147	2,743	3,129	2,587	4,340	2,954	2,600	21,827	6.95%	1	0	1
Red–Green Alliance	Ø	838	1,479	1,221	1,467	4,940	2,770	2,710	3,618	19,043	6.06%	1	0	1
Denmark Democrats	Æ	1,866	2,599	3,495	1,957	871	935	1,202	2,302	15,227	4.85%	0	1	1
Danish Social Liberal Party	B	705	1,123	1,420	1,044	2,669	2,979	2,210	1,654	13,804	4.40%	0	1	1
Citizens' Party	H	891	1,063	1,307	1,021	576	586	671	953	7,068	2.25%	0	0	0
The Alternative	Å	461	808	764	594	1,113	1,030	872	1,333	6,975	2.22%	0	0	0
Valid votes		25,115	36,327	44,073	35,851	40,615	46,005	40,173	45,844	314,003	100.00%	12	3	15
Blank votes		348	463	495	419	631	574	576	468	3,974	1.25%			
Rejected votes – other		64	99	115	105	121	117	128	104	853	0.27%			
Total polled		25,527	36,889	44,683	36,375	41,367	46,696	40,877	46,416	318,830	83.70%			
Registered electors		30,230	43,772	52,517	43,105	52,387	54,537	49,175	55,182	380,905				
Turnout		84.44%	84.28%	85.08%	84.39%	78.96%	85.62%	83.13%	84.11%	83.70%				

The following candidates were elected:

- Constituency seats - Lars Aagaard (M), 5,685 votes; Alex Ahrendtsen (O), 3,281 votes; Marlene Ambo-Rasmussen (V), 9,201 votes; Trine Bramsen (A), 8,112 votes; Bjørn Brandenborg (A), 12,098 votes; Jeppe Bruus (A), 5,501 votes; Katrine Daugaard (I), 2,375 votes; Karsten Hønge (F), 5,373 votes; Thomas Skriver Jensen (A), 4,231 votes; Mai Mercado (C), 6,146 votes; Lise Müller (F), 4,732 votes and Victoria Velasquez (Ø), 7,756 votes.
- Compensatory seats - Jens Henrik Thulesen Dahl (Æ), 1,447 votes; Amanda Heitmann (V), 5,813 votes and Anastasia Milthers (B), 2,393 votes.

==== 2022 ====
Results of the 2022 general election held on 1 November 2022:

Party		Votes per nomination district								Total Votes	%	Seats		
Party		Assens	Faa- borg	Middel- fart	Nyborg	Odense East	Odense South	Odense West	Svend- borg	Total Votes	%	Con.	Com.	Tot.
Social Democrats	A	8,762	12,218	14,314	12,806	12,411	12,324	12,280	15,949	101,064	32.45%	6	0	6
Venstre	V	3,940	4,667	5,880	4,185	3,579	5,559	4,152	4,780	36,742	11.80%	2	0	2
Moderates	M	2,074	3,470	4,335	3,259	3,952	5,526	3,952	4,257	30,825	9.90%	1	0	1
Green Left	F	1,663	2,586	2,972	2,555	4,299	4,127	3,524	3,799	25,525	8.20%	1	0	1
Denmark Democrats	Æ	2,706	4,127	5,087	3,427	1,803	2,249	2,277	3,810	25,486	8.18%	1	0	1
Liberal Alliance	I	1,315	1,870	2,873	1,993	2,921	3,637	2,828	2,555	19,992	6.42%	1	0	1
Conservative People's Party	C	1,096	1,735	2,113	1,860	2,008	3,354	2,210	1,814	16,190	5.20%	0	1	1
Red–Green Alliance	Ø	719	1,400	1,073	1,204	2,928	2,228	1,987	2,948	14,487	4.65%	0	1	1
The New Right	D	1,189	1,477	2,057	1,549	971	1,035	1,076	1,519	10,873	3.49%	0	1	1
Danish Social Liberal Party	B	454	779	935	711	1,933	1,944	1,382	1,167	9,305	2.99%	0	0	0
The Alternative	Å	512	878	710	608	1,549	1,330	1,165	1,724	8,476	2.72%	0	0	0
Danish People's Party	O	810	1,065	1,324	1,033	850	853	867	1,221	8,023	2.58%	0	1	1
Independent Greens	Q	41	99	81	162	1,725	392	288	170	2,958	0.95%	0	0	0
Christian Democrats	K	110	141	156	116	160	167	131	154	1,135	0.36%	0	0	0
Millah Kongsbach (Independent)		36	39	32	30	44	37	34	82	334	0.11%	0	0	0
Valid votes		25,427	36,551	43,942	35,498	41,133	44,762	38,153	45,949	311,415	100.00%	12	4	16
Blank votes		409	591	661	549	858	733	645	622	5,068	1.60%			
Rejected votes – other		95	110	112	120	209	161	234	181	1,222	0.38%			
Total polled		25,931	37,252	44,715	36,167	42,200	45,656	39,032	46,752	317,705	83.86%			
Registered electors		30,733	43,974	52,356	42,780	53,406	53,194	46,942	55,447	378,832				
Turnout		84.38%	84.71%	85.41%	84.54%	79.02%	85.83%	83.15%	84.32%	83.86%				

Votes per municipality:

Party		Votes per municipality										Total Votes
Party		Ærø	Assens	Faa- borg Midt- fyn	Kerte- minde	Lange- land	Middel- fart	Nord- fyn	Nyborg	Odense	Svend- borg	Total Votes
Social Democrats	A	1,173	8,762	11,045	5,718	2,906	8,047	6,267	7,088	37,015	13,043	101,064
Venstre	V	379	3,940	4,288	1,517	1,117	3,265	2,615	2,668	13,290	3,663	36,742
Moderates	M	327	2,074	3,143	1,425	650	2,719	1,616	1,834	13,430	3,607	30,825
Green Left	F	237	1,663	2,349	1,009	546	1,890	1,082	1,546	11,950	3,253	25,525
Denmark Democrats	Æ	714	2,706	3,413	1,401	983	2,640	2,447	2,026	6,329	2,827	25,486
Liberal Alliance	I	143	1,315	1,727	819	330	1,882	991	1,174	9,386	2,225	19,992
Conservative People's Party	C	265	1,096	1,470	1,043	255	1,285	828	817	7,572	1,559	16,190
Red–Green Alliance	Ø	259	719	1,141	505	297	701	372	699	7,143	2,651	14,487
The New Right	D	97	1,189	1,380	738	306	1,092	965	811	3,082	1,213	10,873
Danish Social Liberal Party	B	63	454	716	271	110	683	252	440	5,259	1,057	9,305
The Alternative	Å	136	512	742	248	201	497	213	360	4,044	1,523	8,476
Danish People's Party	O	103	810	962	435	285	701	623	598	2,570	936	8,023
Independent Greens	Q	12	41	87	74	21	59	22	88	2,405	149	2,958
Christian Democrats	K	22	110	119	64	29	97	59	52	458	125	1,135
Millah Kongsbach (Independent)		6	36	33	11	16	21	11	19	115	66	334
Valid votes		3,936	25,427	32,615	15,278	8,052	25,579	18,363	20,220	124,048	37,897	311,415
Blank votes		50	409	541	225	93	373	288	324	2,236	529	5,068
Rejected votes – other		15	95	95	49	33	66	46	71	604	148	1,222
Total polled		4,001	25,931	33,251	15,552	8,178	26,018	18,697	20,615	126,888	38,574	317,705
Registered electors		4,741	30,733	39,233	18,183	9,988	30,172	22,184	24,597	153,542	45,459	378,832
Turnout		84.39%	84.38%	84.75%	85.53%	81.88%	86.23%	84.28%	83.81%	82.64%	84.85%	83.86%

The following candidates were elected:

- Constituency seats - Kim Aas (A), 2,337 votes; Sara Emil Baaring (A), 5,247 votes; Erling Bonnesen (V), 11,572 votes; Trine Bramsen (A), 6,456 votes; Bjørn Brandenborg (A), 11,167 votes; Jens Henrik Thulesen Dahl (Æ), 2,210 votes; Katrine Daugaard (I), 2,861 votes; Rosa Eriksen (M), 4,469 votes; Karsten Hønge (F), 5,215 vots; Thomas Skriver Jensen (A), 3,726 votes; Dan Jørgensen (A), 8,256 votes; and Lars Christian Lilleholt (V), 9,796 votes.
- Compensatory seats - Alex Ahrendtsen (O), 1,477 votes; Mikkel Bjørn (D), 888 votes; Mai Mercado (C), 4,426 votes; and Victoria Velasquez (Ø), 6,676 votes.

==== 2019 ====
Results of the 2019 general election held on 5 June 2019:

Party		Votes per nomination district								Total Votes	%	Seats		
Party		Assens	Faa- borg	Middel- fart	Nyborg	Odense East	Odense South	Odense West	Svend- borg	Total Votes	%	Con.	Com.	Tot.
Social Democrats	A	8,152	10,697	13,645	12,386	12,015	11,618	11,677	14,147	94,337	30.18%	4	1	5
Venstre	V	6,767	9,915	12,069	8,361	7,259	10,815	7,881	9,979	73,046	23.37%	3	1	4
Danish People's Party	O	2,956	3,882	4,484	3,551	2,745	2,971	3,070	4,087	27,746	8.88%	1	1	2
Danish Social Liberal Party	B	1,156	1,994	2,248	1,713	5,646	4,510	2,770	2,756	22,793	7.29%	1	0	1
Red–Green Alliance	Ø	1,287	2,195	1,722	1,911	4,291	3,012	2,630	4,134	21,182	6.78%	1	0	1
Socialist People's Party	F	1,564	2,285	2,527	1,967	3,464	3,273	2,894	2,987	20,961	6.71%	1	0	1
Conservative People's Party	C	1,428	2,124	2,648	2,307	2,006	3,627	2,418	2,698	19,256	6.16%	1	0	1
The Alternative	Å	574	986	763	706	1,901	1,573	1,233	1,769	9,505	3.04%	0	0	0
The New Right	D	572	696	911	764	682	794	645	862	5,926	1.90%	0	0	0
Hard Line	P	594	667	884	743	872	613	736	810	5,919	1.89%	0	0	0
Liberal Alliance	I	365	469	745	518	1,091	1,162	879	638	5,867	1.88%	0	0	0
Christian Democrats	K	327	422	487	339	417	604	398	459	3,453	1.10%	0	0	0
Klaus Riskær Pedersen	E	218	313	329	280	390	323	311	387	2,551	0.82%	0	0	0
Valid votes		25,960	36,645	43,462	35,546	42,779	44,895	37,542	45,713	312,542	100.00%	12	3	15
Blank votes		260	341	401	324	495	418	375	458	3,072	0.97%			
Rejected votes – other		79	87	129	123	200	130	154	125	1,027	0.32%			
Total polled		26,299	37,073	43,992	35,993	43,474	45,443	38,071	46,296	316,641	84.59%			
Registered electors		30,849	43,965	51,542	42,413	53,493	52,257	44,896	54,907	374,322				
Turnout		85.25%	84.32%	85.35%	84.86%	81.27%	86.96%	84.80%	84.32%	84.59%				

Votes per municipality:

Party		Votes per municipality										Total Votes
Party		Ærø	Assens	Faa- borg Midt- fyn	Kerte- minde	Lange- land	Middel- fart	Nord- fyn	Nyborg	Odense	Svend- borg	Total Votes
Social Democrats	A	1,030	8,152	9,667	5,422	2,789	7,713	5,932	6,964	35,310	11,358	94,337
Venstre	V	1,065	6,767	8,850	3,256	1,926	6,715	5,354	5,105	25,955	8,053	73,046
Danish People's Party	O	411	2,956	3,471	1,594	854	2,357	2,127	1,957	8,786	3,233	27,746
Danish Social Liberal Party	B	195	1,156	1,799	709	324	1,595	653	1,004	12,926	2,432	22,793
Red–Green Alliance	Ø	369	1,287	1,826	773	538	1,060	662	1,138	9,933	3,596	21,182
Socialist People's Party	F	228	1,564	2,057	839	488	1,471	1,056	1,128	9,631	2,499	20,961
Conservative People's Party	C	380	1,428	1,744	1,244	591	1,557	1,091	1,063	8,051	2,107	19,256
The Alternative	Å	132	574	854	263	207	498	265	443	4,707	1,562	9,505
The New Right	D	57	572	639	297	144	478	433	467	2,121	718	5,926
Hard Line	P	39	594	628	357	159	421	463	386	2,221	651	5,919
Liberal Alliance	I	29	365	440	218	53	482	263	300	3,132	585	5,867
Christian Democrats	K	52	327	370	172	73	312	175	167	1,419	386	3,453
Klaus Riskær Pedersen	E	33	218	280	123	61	201	128	157	1,024	326	2,551
Valid votes		4,020	25,960	32,625	15,267	8,207	24,860	18,602	20,279	125,216	37,506	312,542
Blank votes		31	260	310	131	65	237	164	193	1,288	393	3,072
Rejected votes – other		9	79	78	54	19	74	55	69	484	106	1,027
Total polled		4,060	26,299	33,013	15,452	8,291	25,171	18,821	20,541	126,988	38,005	316,641
Registered electors		4,895	30,849	39,070	18,054	10,129	29,308	22,234	24,359	150,646	44,778	374,322
Turnout		82.94%	85.25%	84.50%	85.59%	81.85%	85.88%	84.65%	84.33%	84.30%	84.87%	84.59%

The following candidates were elected:

- Constituency seats - Marlene Ambo-Rasmussen (V), 12,301 votes; Erling Bonnesen (V), 15,513 votes; Trine Bramsen (A), 19,903 votes; Bjørn Brandenborg (A), 11,144 votes; Jens Henrik Thulesen Dahl (O), 2,913 votes; Karsten Hønge (F), 4,146 vots; Jan Johansen (A), 12,012 votes; Dan Jørgensen (A), 28,885 votes; Lars Christian Lilleholt (V), 19,394 votes; Mai Mercado (C), 13,494 votes; Rasmus Helveg Petersen (B), 3,763 votes; and Victoria Velasquez (Ø), 7,233 votes.
- Compensatory seats - Alex Ahrendtsen (O), 2,656 votes; Jane Heitmann (V), 8,004 votes; and Julie Skovsby (A), 7,512 votes.

==== 2015 ====
Results of the 2015 general election held on 18 June 2015:

Party		Votes per nomination district								Total Votes	%	Seats		
Party		Assens	Faa- borg	Middel- fart	Nyborg	Odense East	Odense South	Odense West	Svend- borg	Total Votes	%	Con.	Com.	Tot.
Social Democrats	A	7,657	9,985	12,724	12,051	12,493	11,636	11,305	12,210	90,061	28.86%	4	1	5
Danish People's Party	O	6,617	8,691	10,735	8,607	7,245	7,656	7,641	10,721	67,913	21.76%	3	1	4
Venstre	V	5,379	8,211	9,230	6,687	5,199	8,211	5,590	8,166	56,673	18.16%	3	0	3
Red–Green Alliance	Ø	1,806	2,710	2,444	2,405	5,282	3,729	3,246	4,953	26,575	8.51%	1	1	2
Liberal Alliance	I	1,626	1,955	2,675	1,872	3,176	3,864	2,687	2,416	20,271	6.49%	1	0	1
The Alternative	Å	925	1,549	1,280	1,102	2,466	2,227	1,705	2,911	14,165	4.54%	0	1	1
Socialist People's Party	F	939	1,493	1,606	1,435	2,343	2,133	1,877	1,964	13,790	4.42%	0	1	1
Conservative People's Party	C	836	1,590	1,439	1,041	1,172	1,964	1,369	1,438	10,849	3.48%	0	1	1
Danish Social Liberal Party	B	680	1,041	1,212	759	1,895	2,205	1,362	1,359	10,513	3.37%	0	0	0
Christian Democrats	K	115	136	175	129	194	246	139	159	1,293	0.41%	0	0	0
Valid votes		26,580	37,361	43,520	36,088	41,465	43,871	36,921	46,297	312,103	100.00%	12	6	18
Blank votes		254	351	381	317	558	430	395	496	3,182	1.01%			
Rejected votes – other		89	106	89	126	228	179	166	142	1,125	0.36%			
Total polled		26,923	37,818	43,990	36,531	42,251	44,480	37,482	46,935	316,410	86.00%			
Registered electors		30,895	43,810	50,268	42,166	51,695	50,854	43,562	54,666	367,916				
Turnout		87.14%	86.32%	87.51%	86.64%	81.73%	87.47%	86.04%	85.86%	86.00%				

Votes per municipality:

Party		Votes per municipality										Total Votes
Party		Ærø	Assens	Faa- borg Midt- fyn	Kerte- minde	Lange- land	Middel- fart	Nord- fyn	Nyborg	Odense	Svend- borg	Total Votes
Social Democrats	A	965	7,657	9,020	5,183	2,246	7,260	5,464	6,868	35,434	9,964	90,061
Danish People's Party	O	944	6,617	7,747	3,713	2,309	5,784	4,951	4,894	22,542	8,412	67,913
Venstre	V	794	5,379	7,417	2,795	1,912	5,001	4,229	3,892	19,000	6,254	56,673
Red–Green Alliance	Ø	361	1,806	2,349	991	780	1,417	1,027	1,414	12,257	4,173	26,575
Liberal Alliance	I	155	1,626	1,800	819	271	1,637	1,038	1,053	9,727	2,145	20,271
The Alternative	Å	223	925	1,326	449	366	824	456	653	6,398	2,545	14,165
Socialist People's Party	F	128	939	1,365	730	328	1,005	601	705	6,353	1,636	13,790
Conservative People's Party	C	614	836	976	517	169	793	646	524	4,505	1,269	10,849
Danish Social Liberal Party	B	67	680	974	304	152	845	367	455	5,462	1,207	10,513
Christian Democrats	K	16	115	120	66	28	112	63	63	579	131	1,293
Valid votes		4,267	26,580	33,094	15,567	8,561	24,678	18,842	20,521	122,257	37,736	312,103
Blank votes		31	254	320	132	95	224	157	185	1,383	401	3,182
Rejected votes – other		17	89	89	47	41	48	41	79	573	101	1,125
Total polled		4,315	26,923	33,503	15,746	8,697	24,950	19,040	20,785	124,213	38,238	316,410
Registered electors		5,088	30,895	38,722	18,047	10,245	28,428	21,840	24,119	146,111	44,421	367,916
Turnout		84.81%	87.14%	86.52%	87.25%	84.89%	87.77%	87.18%	86.18%	85.01%	86.08%	86.00%

The following candidates were elected:

- Constituency seats - Alex Ahrendtsen (O), 13,702 votes; Pernille Bendixen (O), 9,524 votes; Erling Bonnesen (V), 15,857 votes; Trine Bramsen (A), 16,666 votes; Erik Christensen (A), 8,024 votes; Jens Henrik Thulesen Dahl (O), 26,753 votes; Jane Heitmann (V), 8,307 votes; Jan Johansen (A), 18,894 votes; Dan Jørgensen (A), 29,333 votes; Lars Christian Lilleholt (V), 15,705 votes; Merete Riisager (I), 16,481 votes; and Pernille Skipper (Ø), 13,895 votes.
- Compensatory seats - Karsten Hønge (F), 5,015 vots; Rune Lund (Ø), 1,758 votes; Roger Matthisen(Å), 5,109 votes; Mai Mercado (C), 8,275 votes; Julie Skovsby (A), 7,598 votes; and Dorthe Ullemose (O), 7,148 votes.

==== 2011 ====
Results of the 2011 general election held on 15 September 2011:

Party		Votes per nomination district								Total Votes	%	Seats		
Party		Assens	Faa- borg	Middel- fart	Nyborg	Odense East	Odense South	Odense West	Svend- borg	Total Votes	%	Con.	Com.	Tot.
Social Democrats	A	7,841	10,228	11,791	11,388	13,425	10,827	11,028	13,049	89,577	28.38%	4	1	5
Venstre	V	7,191	11,075	12,774	9,020	6,704	10,988	7,830	11,263	76,845	24.34%	3	1	4
Danish People's Party	O	3,634	5,005	6,179	4,968	4,227	4,521	4,462	5,982	38,978	12.35%	2	0	2
Socialist People's Party	F	2,509	3,586	4,112	3,799	5,279	4,400	3,876	5,429	32,990	10.45%	1	1	2
Danish Social Liberal Party	B	1,935	3,096	3,112	2,458	4,066	4,820	3,107	4,064	26,658	8.45%	1	0	1
Red–Green Alliance	Ø	1,419	2,070	1,825	1,871	3,581	2,660	2,445	4,043	19,914	6.31%	1	0	1
Conservative People's Party	C	1,291	1,844	2,013	1,551	1,948	2,953	2,224	2,209	16,033	5.08%	0	1	1
Liberal Alliance	I	1,135	1,405	1,960	1,426	1,748	2,233	1,490	1,767	13,164	4.17%	0	1	1
Christian Democrats	K	139	180	166	125	159	220	113	228	1,330	0.42%	0	0	0
Lars Grønbæk Larsen (Independent)		4	12	4	47	4	11	4	16	102	0.03%	0	0	0
Michael Ellegaard (Independent)		2	6	12	6	9	12	9	13	69	0.02%	0	0	0
Valid votes		27,100	38,507	43,948	36,659	41,150	43,645	36,588	48,063	315,660	100.00%	12	5	17
Blank votes		224	298	300	264	321	308	294	335	2,344	0.73%			
Rejected votes – other		81	127	137	159	203	140	148	150	1,145	0.36%			
Total polled		27,405	38,932	44,385	37,082	41,674	44,093	37,030	48,548	319,149	87.78%			
Registered electors		31,003	44,247	49,998	41,745	49,693	49,486	42,136	55,260	363,568				
Turnout		88.39%	87.99%	88.77%	88.83%	83.86%	89.10%	87.88%	87.85%	87.78%				

Votes per municipality:

Party		Votes per municipality										Total Votes
Party		Ærø	Assens	Faa- borg Midt- fyn	Kerte- minde	Lange- land	Middel- fart	Nord- fyn	Nyborg	Odense	Svend- borg	Total Votes
Social Democrats	A	1,113	7,841	9,115	5,002	2,567	6,622	5,169	6,386	35,280	10,482	89,577
Venstre	V	1,304	7,191	9,771	3,740	2,224	7,159	5,615	5,280	25,522	9,039	76,845
Danish People's Party	O	676	3,634	4,329	2,122	1,388	3,285	2,894	2,846	13,210	4,594	38,978
Socialist People's Party	F	371	2,509	3,215	1,719	916	2,158	1,954	2,080	13,555	4,513	32,990
Danish Social Liberal Party	B	287	1,935	2,809	1,057	596	2,084	1,028	1,401	11,993	3,468	26,658
Red–Green Alliance	Ø	309	1,419	1,761	759	688	1,083	742	1,112	8,686	3,355	19,914
Conservative People's Party	C	404	1,291	1,440	753	358	1,140	873	798	7,125	1,851	16,033
Liberal Alliance	I	121	1,135	1,284	634	268	1,190	770	792	5,471	1,499	13,164
Christian Democrats	K	29	139	151	61	45	110	56	64	492	183	1,330
Lars Grønbæk Larsen (Independent)		1	4	11	7	2	2	2	40	19	14	102
Michael Ellegaard (Independent)		0	2	6	1	5	8	4	5	30	8	69
Valid votes		4,615	27,100	33,892	15,855	9,057	24,841	19,107	20,804	121,383	39,006	315,660
Blank votes		32	224	266	109	58	151	149	155	923	277	2,344
Rejected votes – other		21	81	106	61	29	74	63	98	491	121	1,145
Total polled		4,668	27,405	34,264	16,025	9,144	25,066	19,319	21,057	122,797	39,404	319,149
Registered electors		5,325	31,003	38,922	17,844	10,679	27,987	22,011	23,901	141,315	44,581	363,568
Turnout		87.66%	88.39%	88.03%	89.81%	85.63%	89.56%	87.77%	88.10%	86.90%	88.39%	87.78%

The following candidates were elected:

- Constituency seats - Alex Ahrendtsen (O), 6,983 votes; Anne Baastrup (F), 12,569 votes; Erling Bonnesen (V), 16,239 votes; Trine Bramsen (A), 8,464 votes; Jens Henrik Thulesen Dahl (O), 14,961 votes; Jakob Ellemann-Jensen (V), 17,095 votes; Carsten Hansen (A), 15,470 votes; Camilla Hersom (B), 14,769 votes; Jan Johansen (A), 7,982 votes; Lars Christian Lilleholt (V), 23,111 votes; Pernille Rosenkrantz-Theil (A), 32,337 votes; Pernille Skipper (Ø), 5,777 votes;
- Compensatory seats - Jane Heitmann (V), 8,535 votes; Mai Henriksen (C), 7,213 votes; Merete Riisager (I), 8,141 votes; Julie Skovsby (A), 7,489 votes; and Annette Vilhelmsen (F), 5,782 votes.

==== 2007 ====
Results of the 2007 general election held on 13 November 2007:

Party		Votes per nomination district								Total Votes	%	Seats		
Party		Assens	Faa- borg	Middel- fart	Nyborg	Odense East	Odense South	Odense West	Svend- borg	Total Votes	%	Con.	Com.	Tot.
Social Democrats	A	7,198	9,533	11,214	10,186	12,459	10,375	10,323	12,107	83,395	26.93%	4	0	4
Venstre	V	6,430	10,105	10,961	8,400	5,439	8,048	5,768	11,047	66,198	21.38%	3	0	3
Danish People's Party	O	4,236	5,771	6,977	5,709	5,282	5,323	5,173	7,372	45,843	14.80%	2	0	2
Socialist People's Party	F	3,136	4,791	4,641	4,761	7,507	6,144	5,305	6,973	43,258	13.97%	2	0	2
Conservative People's Party	C	3,517	4,656	5,712	4,188	4,645	7,619	5,802	5,086	41,225	13.31%	1	1	2
Danish Social Liberal Party	B	1,160	1,907	1,880	1,411	2,251	2,777	1,676	2,492	15,554	5.02%	0	1	1
New Alliance	Y	649	892	957	711	1,028	1,327	807	1,105	7,476	2.41%	0	0	0
Unity List	Ø	302	558	386	432	1,080	819	640	1,229	5,446	1.76%	0	0	0
Christian Democrats	K	112	134	146	107	181	222	116	177	1,195	0.39%	0	0	0
Michael Ellegård (Independent)		3	9	9	13	3	10	7	14	68	0.02%	0	0	0
Valid votes		26,743	38,356	42,883	35,918	39,875	42,664	35,617	47,602	309,658	100.00%	12	2	14
Blank votes		142	226	228	207	202	191	156	267	1,619	0.52%			
Rejected votes – other		84	93	98	70	94	95	84	105	723	0.23%			
Total polled		26,969	38,675	43,209	36,195	40,171	42,950	35,857	47,974	312,000	86.55%			
Registered electors		31,094	44,375	49,435	41,356	48,724	48,691	41,412	55,388	360,475				
Turnout		86.73%	87.15%	87.41%	87.52%	82.45%	88.21%	86.59%	86.61%	86.55%				

Votes per municipality:

Party		Votes per municipality										Total Votes
Party		Ærø	Assens	Faa- borg Midt- fyn	Kerte- minde	Lange- land	Middel- fart	Nord- fyn	Nyborg	Odense	Svend- borg	Total Votes
Social Democrats	A	1,176	7,198	8,357	4,397	2,298	6,362	4,852	5,789	33,157	9,809	83,395
Venstre	V	1,158	6,430	8,947	3,367	2,286	6,124	4,837	5,033	19,255	8,761	66,198
Danish People's Party	O	721	4,236	5,050	2,482	1,763	3,737	3,240	3,227	15,778	5,609	45,843
Socialist People's Party	F	474	3,136	4,317	2,083	1,170	2,644	1,997	2,678	18,956	5,803	43,258
Conservative People's Party	C	748	3,517	3,908	2,004	883	2,952	2,760	2,184	18,066	4,203	41,225
Danish Social Liberal Party	B	157	1,160	1,750	618	402	1,198	682	793	6,704	2,090	15,554
New Alliance	Y	81	649	811	307	194	588	369	404	3,162	911	7,476
Unity List	Ø	69	302	489	172	211	230	156	260	2,539	1,018	5,446
Christian Democrats	K	18	112	116	55	32	101	45	52	519	145	1,195
Michael Ellegård (Independent)		0	3	9	4	1	5	4	9	20	13	68
Valid votes		4,602	26,743	33,754	15,489	9,240	23,941	18,942	20,429	118,156	38,362	309,658
Blank votes		17	142	209	92	68	117	111	115	549	199	1,619
Rejected votes – other		10	84	83	32	26	65	33	38	273	79	723
Total polled		4,629	26,969	34,046	15,613	9,334	24,123	19,086	20,582	118,978	38,640	312,000
Registered electors		5,434	31,094	38,941	17,562	10,998	27,541	21,894	23,794	138,827	44,390	360,475
Turnout		85.19%	86.73%	87.43%	88.90%	84.87%	87.59%	87.17%	86.50%	85.70%	87.05%	86.55%

The following candidates were elected:

- Constituency seats - Poul Andersen (A), 10,234 votes; Anne Baastrup (F), 23,011 votes; Bendt Bendtsen (C), 33,026 votes; Erling Bonnesen (V), 21,028 votes; Jens Henrik Thulesen Dahl (O), 35,865 votes; Carsten Hansen (A), 19,152 votes; Britta Schall Holberg (V), 7,458 votes; Karsten Hønge (F), 5,996 votes; Lars Christian Lilleholt (V), 17,525 votes; Tina Petersen (O), 3,568 votes; Niels Sindal (A), 12,061 votes; Julie Skovsby (A), 15,520 votes;
- Compensatory seats - Vivi Kier (C), 3,022 votes; and Niels Helveg Petersen (B), 8,211 votes.
