= Karsten Hønge =

Danish politician

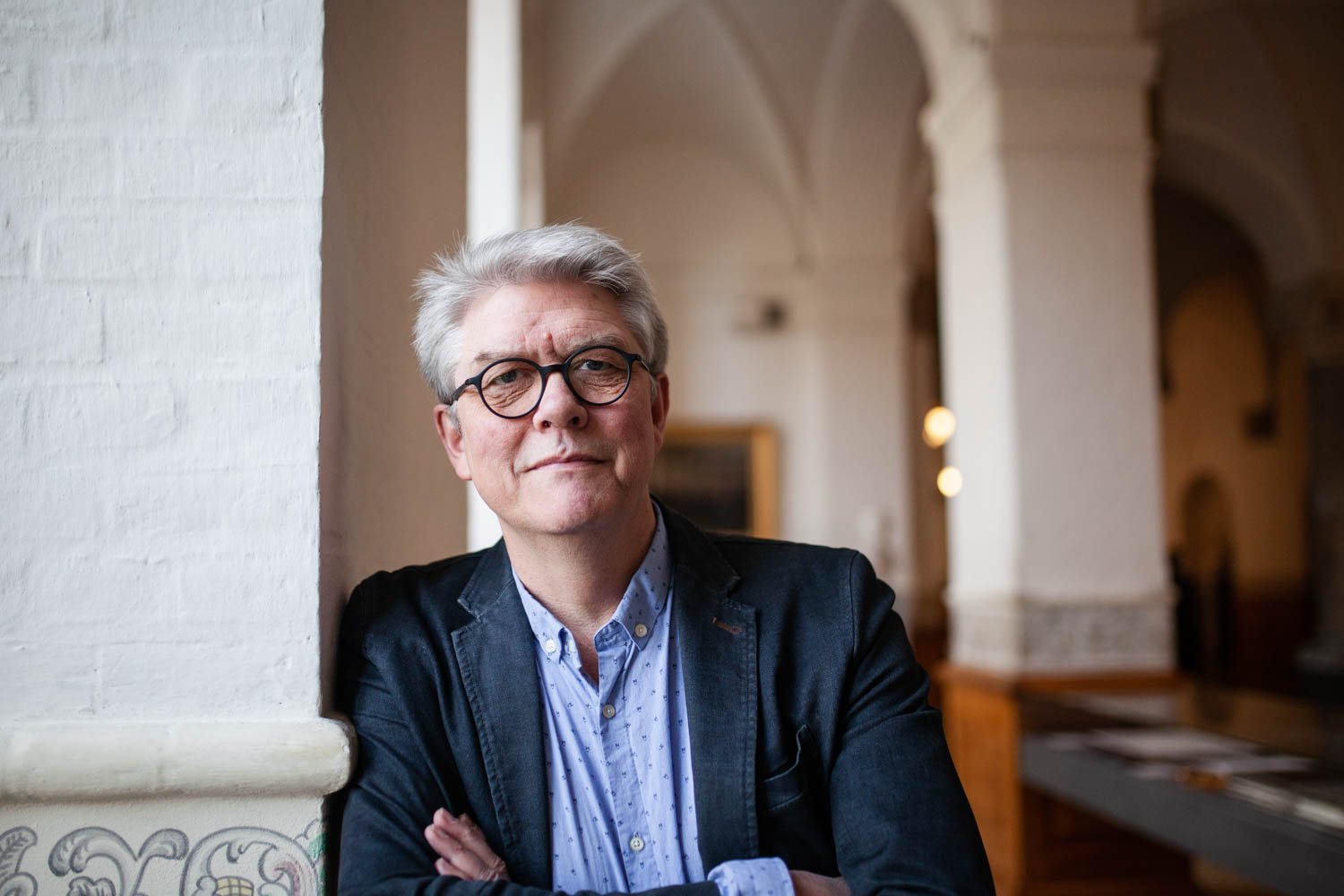
- Hønge in 2018

Member of the Folketing
- Incumbent
- Assumed office 18 June 2015
- Constituency: Funen
- In office 13 November 2007 – 15 September 2011
- Constituency: Funen

Personal details
- Born: 25 September 1958 (age 67) Nykøbing Mors, Denmark
- Party: Socialist People's Party

Karsten Hønge (born 25 September 1958) is a Danish politician, who is member of the Folketing for the Socialist People's Party. Karsten Hønge is one of few people who has been elected to city councils, county councils, regional council, Folketing, and the European Parliament.

== Political career ==
He joined SF and its youth wing SFU in 1973. He was a member of the national leadership of SFU in 1974-1977. He was politically active during his time at Thisted Gymnasium, and from 1977 to 1978 was the vice-chairman of Danske Gymnasieelevers Sammenslutning, the Danish association of gymnasium students.

From 1978 to 1979, Hønge was a soldier at Skive Garrison; he was a member of the executive committee for the conscripts. Until 2007 he was chairman of the Fynes chapter of the trade union TIB (Træ Industri Byg), who later merged with 3F.

He was a member of the County Council in Fynen County from 2001 to 2006, and served on the city council of Odense from 2005 to 2007, where he was leader of the group and member of the employment committee.

In the public debate, Hønge was one of the first on the left wing to criticize Asmaa Abdol-Hamid from the Red-Green Alliance. He did so at the 2005 local elections, when they both ran for the city council in Odense. In 2006 he wrote the pamphlet "A bull against fundamentalism. A defense for free thoughts." (Danish: ”En bandbulle mod fundamentalisme. Et forsvar for frisind"), critical of religious fundamentalism.

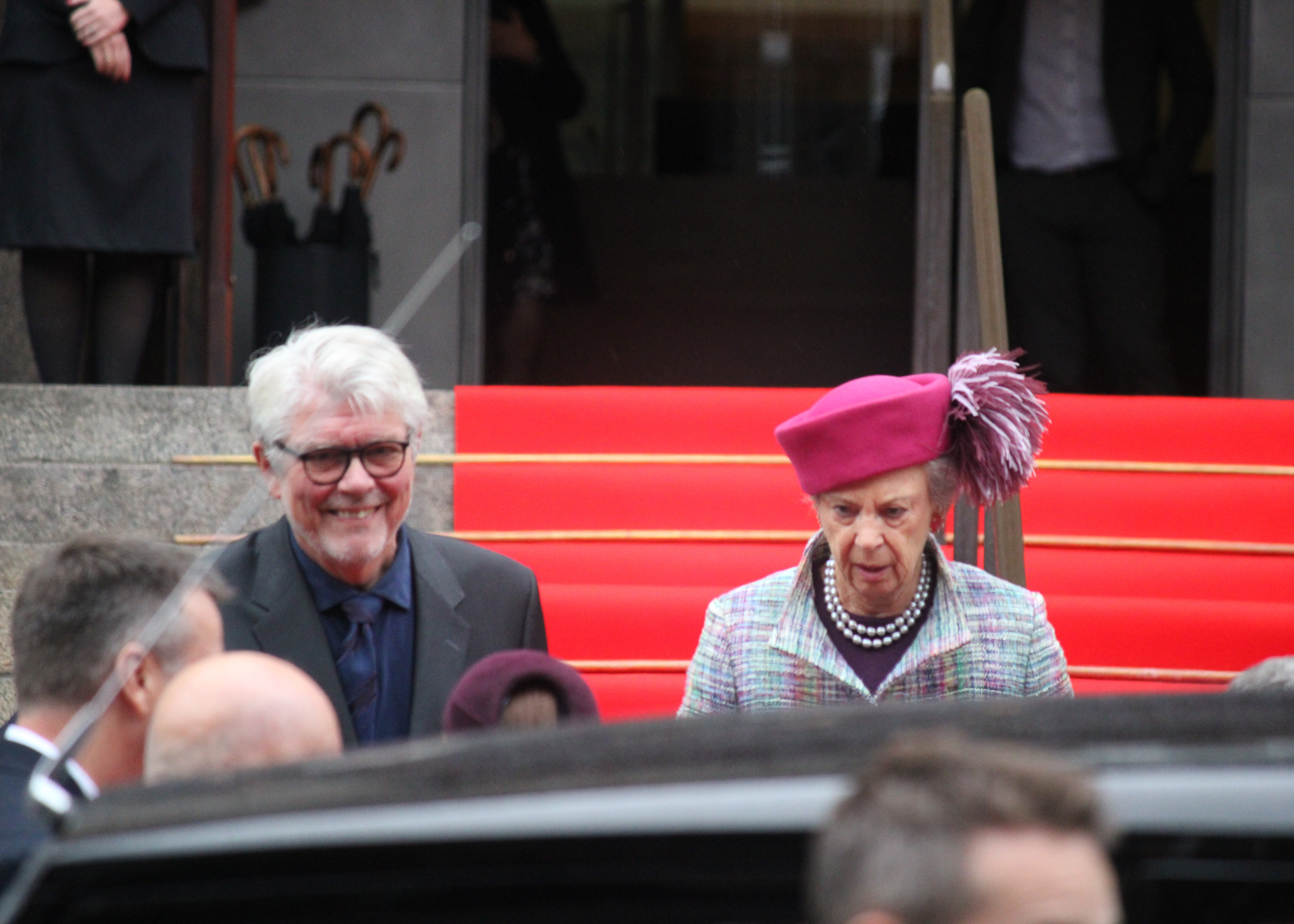
Hønge with Princess Benedikte at the 2025 opening of the Folketing

Hønge had been a candidate to the Folketing since 1993, and at the 2007 general election, he was elected to the Folketing. In 2013 he was elected to the regional council in the Region of Southern Denmark as the lead candidate from SF.

In January 2014, he joined the Folketing again as a substitute for Anne Baastrup who was on sick leave. As a substitute, he made critical statements concerning the imminent sale of part of Dong to Goldman Sachs, which SF supported as part of the government. His statements contributed to the resignation of party leader Annette Vilhelmsen and the departure of SF from the government a week later. Due to his role in this, he was given the nickname "the substitute from hell" by the press.

At the 2015 general election, Hønge was reelected to the Folketing in Funen constituency. He was reelected in 2019.

=== 2019 election to the European Parliament ===
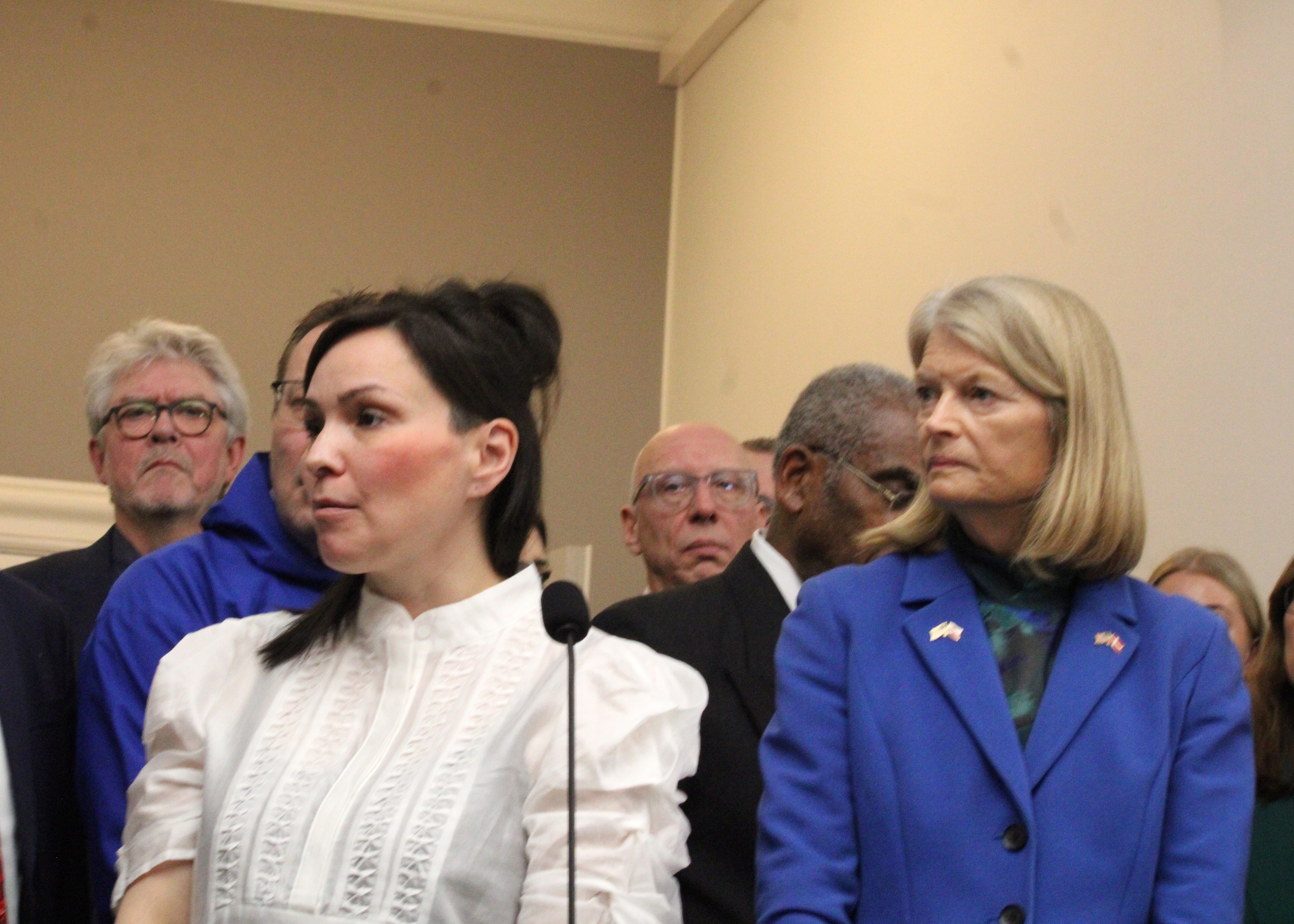
Hønge with Pipaluk Lynge and Lisa Murkowski among others at Christiansborg during the Greenland crisis, 16 January 2026

In May 2019, Hønge was a candidate to the European Parliament election, as SF's second candidate on the list after Margrete Auken. The party won two seats, and Hønge won the second. However, since he was also running for reelection to the Folketing at the general election 10 days later, he decided not to take his seat, who instead went to Kira Marie Peter-Hansen. This was criticized by the voters who voted for him. In 2018, Hønge said to a number of media outlets, that he would leave the Folketing, if he were elected to the European Parliament. In weeks prior to the election, Hønge had said to local media on Funen, that the general elections had first priority. Hønge later apologized that he was unclear in the process, and called it an "election-blunder". Several members of the Folketing later criticized SF and Hønge's decision, calling it to making fun of the voters and increasing the political alienation.

== Personal life ==
Karsten Hønge was born on 25 September 1958 in Nykøbing Mors. He is the son of Anker Hønge, a carpenter and Inger Hønge, a cleaning assistant. He graduated from Thisted Gymnasium in 1978, and became a carpenter in 1983. In 2013 he became journalist from Danish School of Media and Journalism.
