= Pernille Bendixen =

Danish author and politician

Member of the Folketing
- In office 18 June 2015 – 5 June 2019
- Constituency: Fyn

Personal details
- Born: 1 March 1973 (age 53) Århus, Denmark
- Party: Danish People's Party

Pernille Bruun Bendixen (born 1 March 1973 in Århus) is a Danish politician, who was a member of the Folketing for the Danish People's Party from 2015 to 2019.

== Political career ==
Bendixen has been a member of Odense Municipality's municipal council since 2010. Bendixen was elected into parliament at the 2015 Danish general election, where she received 3,491 votes. She ran again in the 2019 election, receiving 1,492 votes, but did not get reelected. The personal votes cast for her was enough for her to become the Danish People's Party primary substitute in the Fyn constituency. During Alex Ahrendtsen's leave of absence from 3 December 2019 to 30 September 2020, Bendixen acted as his substitute.
