= Rasmus Helveg Petersen =

Danish politician (born 1968)

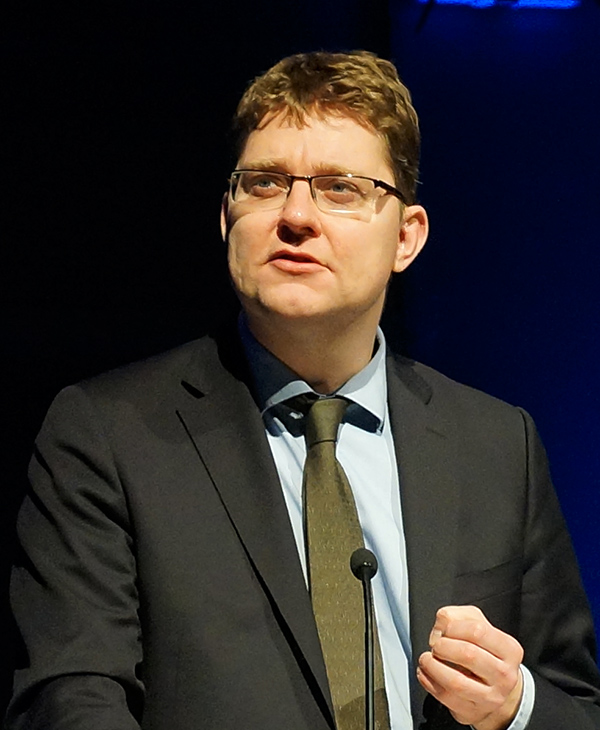

Minister of Climate, Energy and Building
- In office 3 February 2014 – 28 June 2015
- Prime Minister: Helle Thorning-Schmidt
- Preceded by: Martin Lidegaard
- Succeeded by: Hans Christian Schmidt

Minister for Development Cooperation
- In office 21 November 2013 – 3 February 2014
- Preceded by: Christian Friis Bach
- Succeeded by: Mogens Jensen

Member of the Folketing
- Incumbent
- Assumed office 5 June 2019
- Constituency: Fyn
- In office 15 September 2011 – 20 June 2015
- Constituency: Zealand

Personal details
- Born: 17 June 1968 (age 58) Copenhagen, Denmark
- Party: Danish Social Liberal Party
- Cabinet: Helle Thorning-Schmidt I, II

Rasmus Helveg Petersen (born 17 June 1968) is a Danish politician, who is a member of the Folketing for the Danish Social Liberal Party. He served as Minister for Development Cooperation from 21 November 2013 to 3 February 2014, and as Minister of Climate, Energy and Building from 3 February 2014 to 28 June 2015. He was elected into parliament at the 2019 Danish general election, having previously served from 2011 to 2015. He is the brother of Morten Helveg Petersen, who serves as a member of the European Parliament for the same party.

== Political career ==
Petersen was first elected into parliament at the 2011 election, where he received 3,662 votes. He served as Minister for Development Cooperation from 21 November 2013 to 3 February 2014, in the Thorning-Schmidt I Cabinet. When the Socialist People's Party left the coalition, a new cabinet was formed. Here Petersen served as Minister of Climate, Energy and Building from 3 February 2014 to 28 June 2015.

In the 2015 election he received 2,151 votes and was not reelected. His election result did make him the Social Liberal Party's primary substitute in the Zealand constituency. He was called upon twice during the term: From 1 September 2015 to 31 December 2015 and from 6 September 2018 to 7 May 2019. Both times he were substitute for Zenia Stampe. Petersen ran again in the 2019 election, where he received 3,763 votes, getting elected into parliament again.

Political offices
Preceded by Martin Lidegaard	Minister of Climate, Energy and Building; 2014–2015	Succeeded by Lars Christian Lilleholt
Preceded by Christian Friis Bach	Minister for Development Cooperation; 2013–2014	Succeeded by Mogens Jensen
