= Thorning-Schmidt Cabinet =

Thorning-Schmidt Cabinet may refer to:

- Thorning-Schmidt I Cabinet (2011-2014)
- Thorning-Schmidt II Cabinet (2014-2015)
