= Lars Christian Lilleholt =

Danish politician

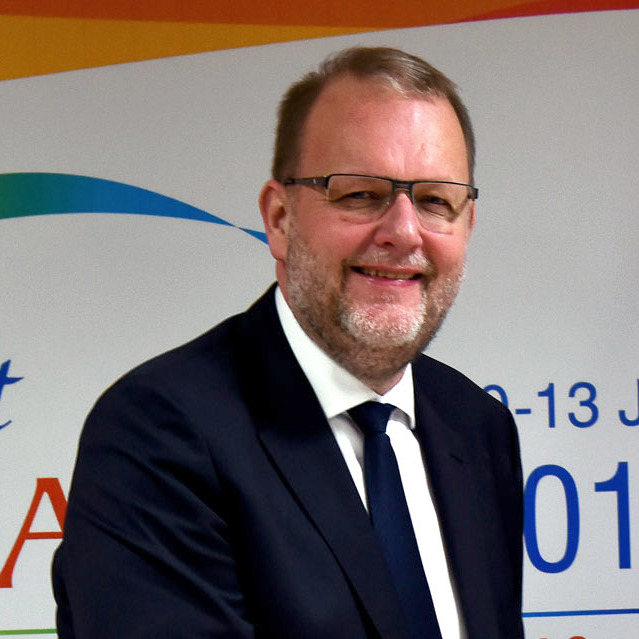

Minister of Climate, Energy and Building
- In office 28 June 2015 – 27 June 2019
- Prime Minister: Lars Løkke Rasmussen
- Preceded by: Rasmus Helveg Petersen
- Succeeded by: Dan Jørgensen

Member of the Folketing
- Incumbent
- Assumed office 20 November 2001
- Constituency: Fyn

Personal details
- Born: 2 March 1965 (age 61) Odense, Denmark
- Party: Venstre

Lars Christian Lilleholt (born 2 March 1965) is a Danish politician, who is a member of the Folketing for the Venstre political party. He was Minister of Energy, Utilities and Climate from 2015 to 2019. He was elected into parliament in the 2001 Danish general election.

== Political career ==
His political career started as member of Venstres Ungdom's National Committee 1983–88, from 1985 to 1988 serving as deputy chairman. He was a member of the board of Venstre 1985–89. He has been a parliamentary candidate for Venstre since 1993 He served as temporary Member of Parliament 14 January – 31 January 1997 and 18 January – 10 February 2000.

Lilleholt is a journalist by profession. Former places of employment include Vejle Amts Folkeblad 1990-91 and 1993–94, Fyns Amts Avis 1994–95, and the Danish District Heating Association (Danske Fjernvarmeværkers Forening) since 1995.

Political offices
Preceded by Rasmus Helveg Petersen	Minister of Climate, Energy and Building; 2015–2019	Succeeded by Dan Jørgensen
