= Jens Henrik Thulesen Dahl =

Danish politician (born 1961)

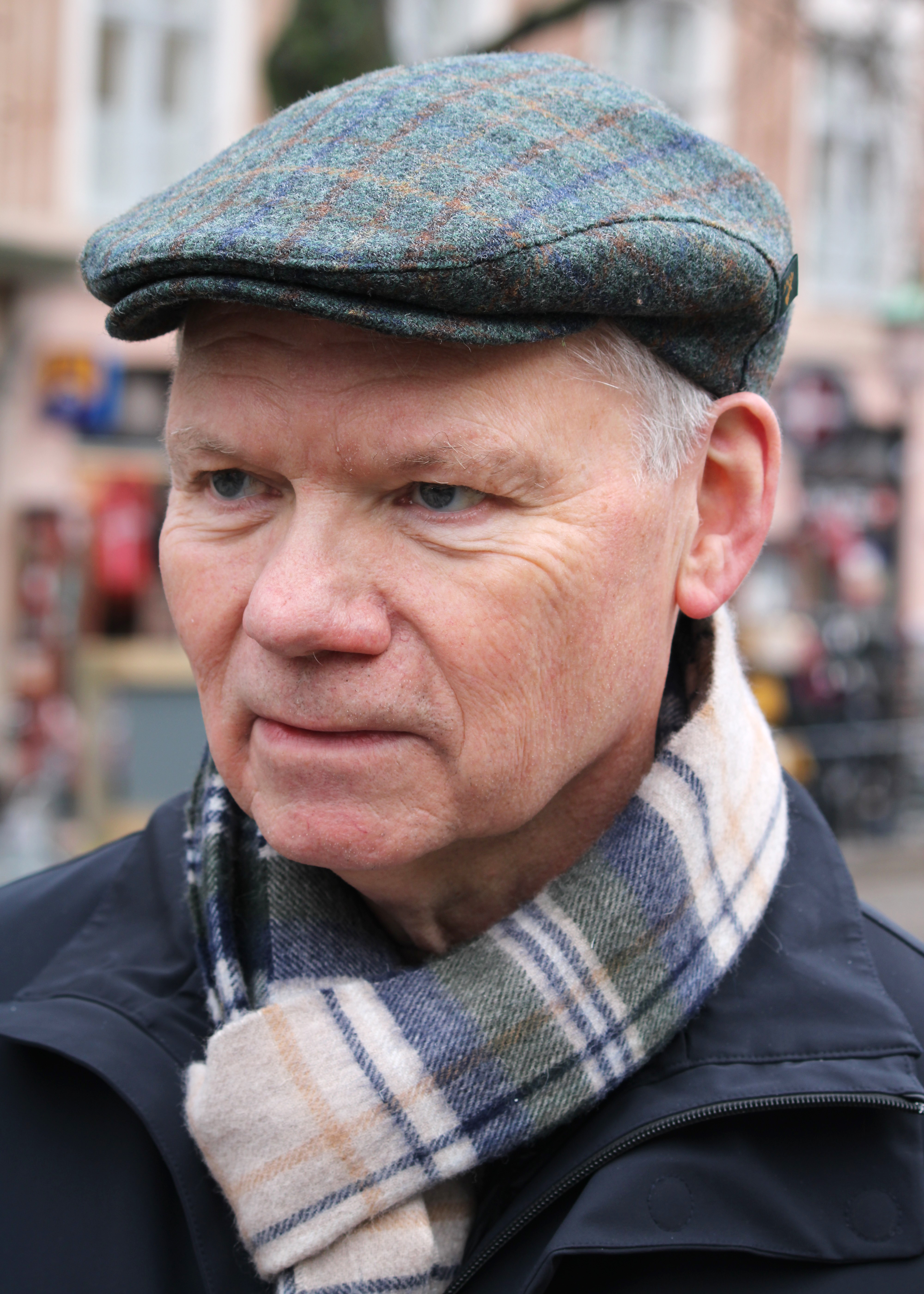
- Thulesen Dahl in 2026

Member of the Folketing
- Incumbent
- Assumed office 15 September 2011
- Constituency: Funen

Personal details
- Born: Jens Henrik Winther Thulesen Dahl; 20 July 1961 (age 64) Brædstrup, Denmark
- Party: Denmark Democrats (from 2022)
- Other party: Danish People's Party (until 2022)

Jens Henrik Winther Thulesen Dahl (born 20 July 1961) is a Danish politician, who is a member of the Folketing for the Denmark Democrats, and former member of the Danish People's Party. He was elected into parliament at the 2011 Danish general election.

== Background ==
Jens Henrik Thulesen Dahl is the brother of fellow MF Kristian Thulesen Dahl.

== Political career ==
Thulesen Dahl has been a member of the municipal council of Assens Municipality since 2010.

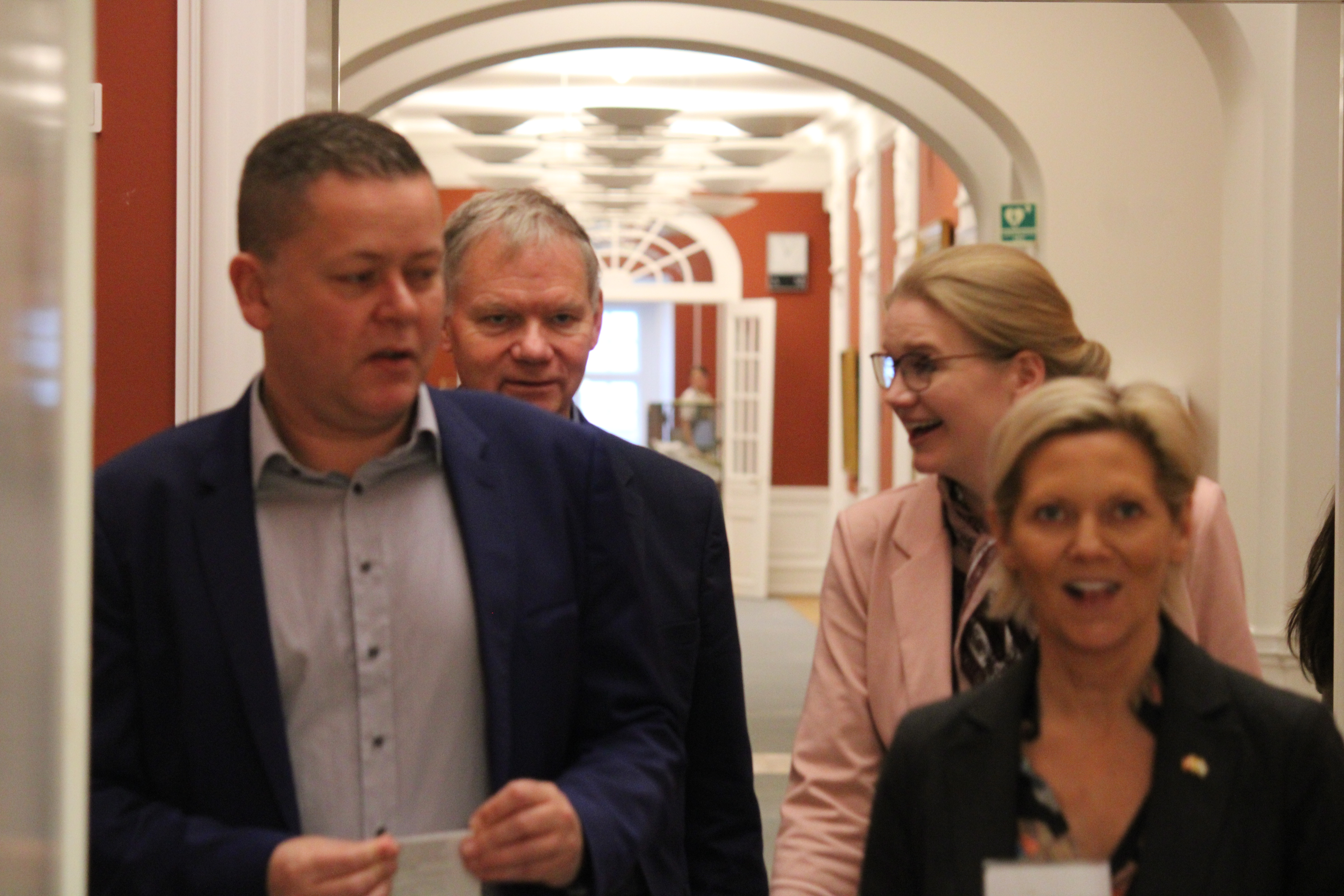
Thulesen Dahl walking behind Dennis Flydtkjær at Christiansborg in Copenhagen, 9 December 2025

Thulesen Dahl first ran for parliament in the 2011 general election, where he was elected with 5,594 votes. He was reelected with 9,923 votes in the 2015 election and again in the 2019 election with 2,913 votes. He joined the newly founded party the Denmark Democrats in August 2022, and was re-elected at the 2022 Danish general election with 2,210 votes.
