= Marlene Ambo-Rasmussen =

Danish politician

Member of the Folketing
- Incumbent
- Assumed office 5 June 2019
- Constituency: Funen

Personal details
- Born: 14 March 1986 (age 40) Magleby, Denmark
- Party: Venstre
- Education: University of Southern Denmark

Marlene Ambo-Rasmussen (born 14 March 1986 in Magleby on Langeland) is a Danish politician, who is a member of the Folketing for the Venstre political party. She has a background as a disability assistant. She was elected into parliament in the 2019 Danish general election.

== Political career ==
Ambo-Rasmussen first ran in the 2015 Danish general election, though did not get elected. She received 2,239 personal votes, which got her elected as a substitute member of the Folketing in the 2015-2019 term, though she was not called upon during the term. In the 2019 election she received 6,312 personal votes, securing her a seat in the Folketing.
