= Pernille Rosenkrantz-Theil =

Danish politician (born 1977)

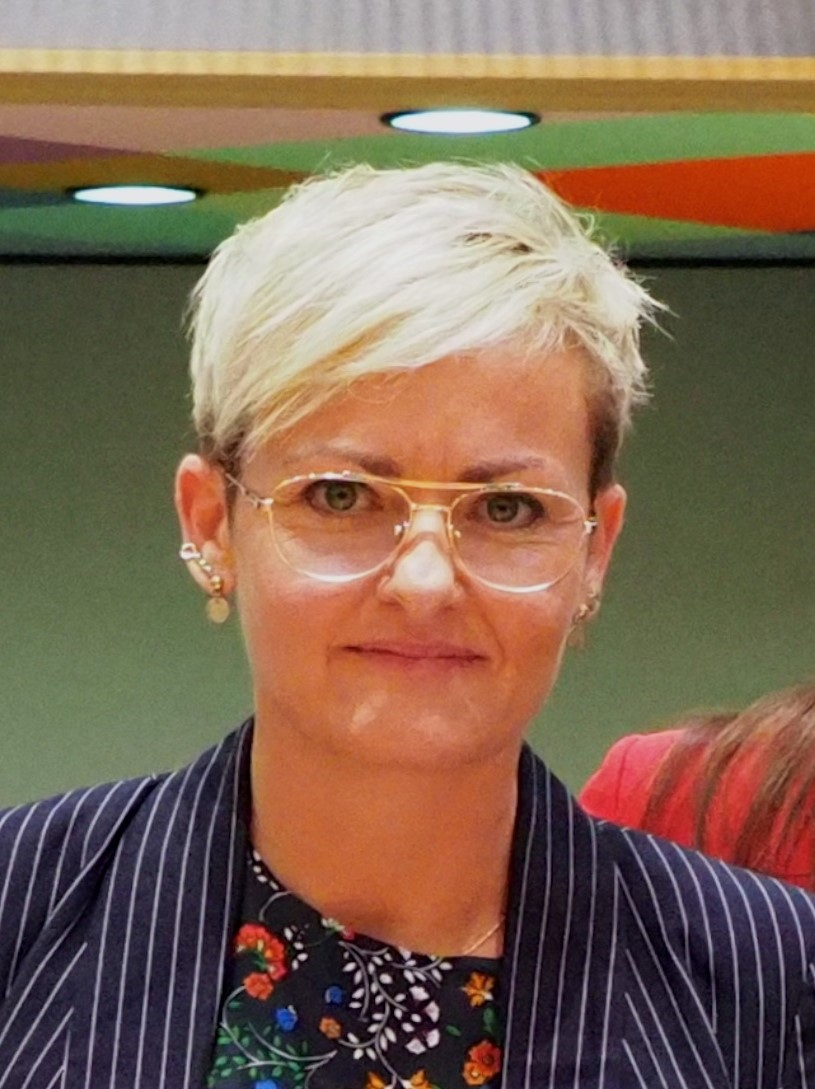
- Rosenkrantz-Theil in 2019

Minister of Children and Education
- In office 27 June 2019 – 15 December 2022
- Prime Minister: Mette Frederiksen
- Preceded by: Mai Mercado (Children); Merete Riisager (Education)
- Succeeded by: Mattias Tesfaye

Member of the Folketing
- Incumbent
- Assumed office 15 September 2011
- Constituency: Copenhagen (from 2019); Zealand (2015—2019); Fyn (2011—2015)
- In office 20 November 2001 – 13 November 2007
- Constituency: Østre (2005—2007); Fyn (2001—2005)

Personal details
- Born: 17 January 1977 (age 49) Skælskør, Denmark
- Party: Social Democrats (2008–present)
- Other political affiliations: Red-Green Alliance (1999—2008)

Pernille Rosenkrantz-Theil (born 17 January 1977) is a Danish politician, who is a member of the Folketing for the Social Democrats political party. From 2019 to 2022, she has served as Minister of Children and Education. She was elected into parliament at the 2011 Danish general election. She had previously been a member of parliament from 2001 to 2007 as a member of the Red-Green Alliance. From 2011 to 2014, she was the spokesperson on climate and energy for the Social Democrats.

== Political career ==
From April 20 to July 31, 1999, Rosenkrantz-Theil was a temporary member of the parliament. She was elected to the parliament in 2001. From 1996 to 2007, she was a member of the central board and working committee of Red-Green Alliance. She was spokeswoman for equality, health, financial, educational, and ecclesiastical affairs. After a break from politics she joined the Social Democrats and was elected to the parliament in 2011. On 27 June 2019, she became the Minister of Education in the Frederiksen Cabinet.

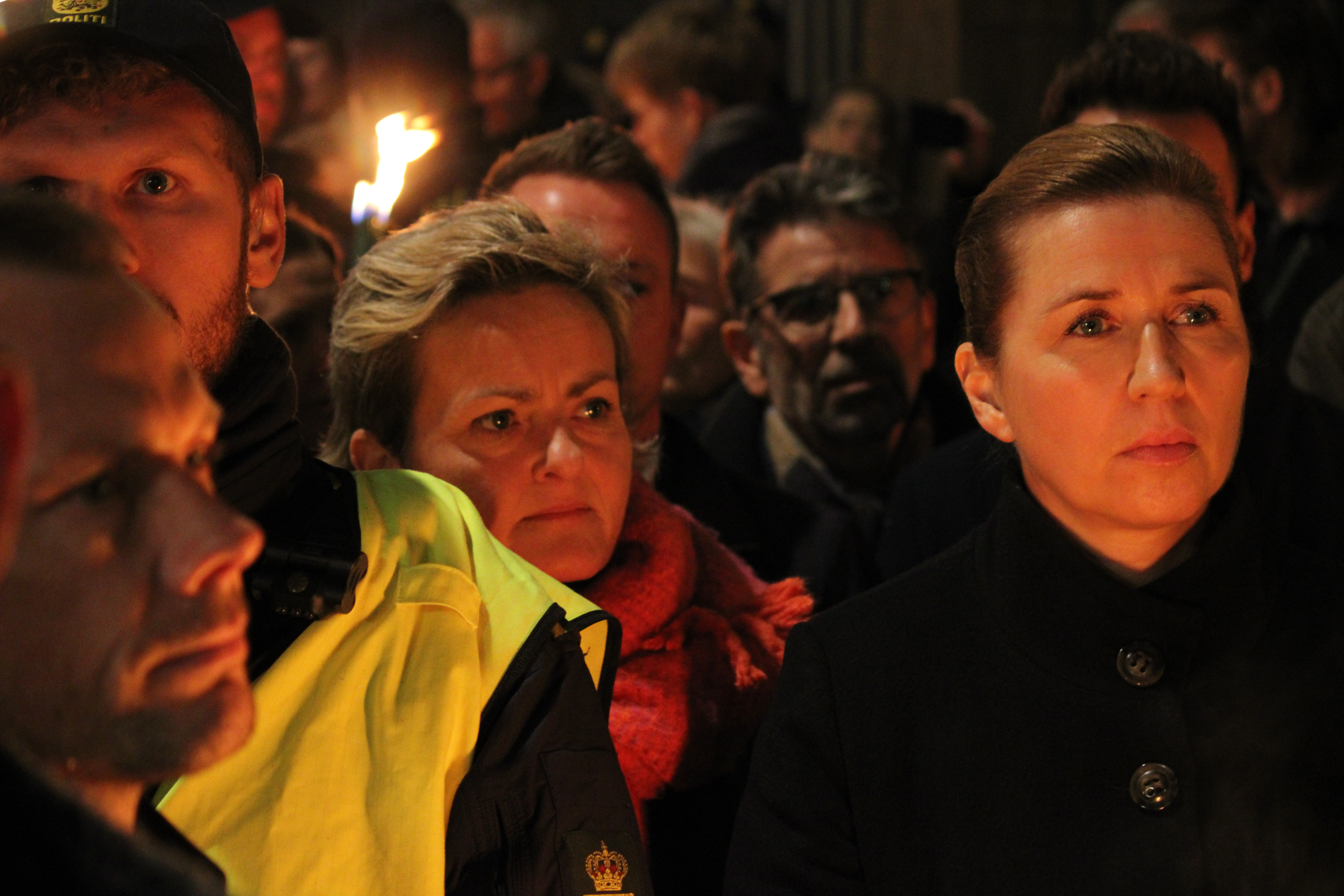
Rosenkrantz-Theil with prime minister Mette Frederiksen at the annual Kristallnacht remembrance event at the Copenhagen Synagogue on Krystalgade, 9 November 2025

After failing to get elected as mayor of Copenhagen in the 2025 City council election, Rosenkrantz-Theil retired from politics.

== Background ==
Rosenkrantz-Theil has been active in organizational activism and politics from an early age. During her high school years, from 1992 to 1995, she was a member of the executive committee of "Danske Gymnnasieelevers Sammenslutning" (Union of Upper Secondary School Students), an organization which works to improve high school students' conditions in Denmark. In 1998, she was campaign leader of "Operation Dagsværk" (Operation Day's Work), a nationwide charity activist day for Danish high school students. In her work life, Rosenkrantz-Theil has worked as consultant for Danish unions amongst other jobs. Rosenkrantz-Theil completed her bachelor's degree in political science in 2004 from the University of Copenhagen.

== Bibliography ==
- Hvilket velfærdssamfund? (2019)
- Det betaler sig at investere i mennesker - en bog om sociale investeringer, tidlig indsats, finansministeriets regnemodeller & SØM (2018, co-author with Ane Halsboe-Jørgensen)
- Ned og op med stress (2010)
- Fra kamp til kultur - 20 smagsdommere skyder med skarpt (2004, contributor)
- En dollar om dagen (2001, contributor)

Political offices
Preceded by Mai Mercado	Minister of Children; 2019–2022	Succeeded by Mattias Tesfaye
Preceded by Merete Riisager	Minister of Education; 2019–2022	Succeeded by Mattias Tesfaye
