= Jan Johansen (politician) =

Danish politician

Member of the Folketing
- Incumbent
- Assumed office 15 September 2011
- Constituency: Funen

Personal details
- Born: 12 December 1955 (age 70) Svendborg, Denmark
- Party: Social Democrats

Jan Johansen (born 12 December 1955 in Svendborg) is a Danish politician, who is a member of the Folketing for the Social Democrats political party. He was elected into parliament at the 2011 Danish general election.

== Political career ==
Johansen sat in the municipal council of Munkebo Municipality from 1997 to 2006, and served as deputy mayor from 2001 to 2006. In 2006 the municipality was merged with Kerteminde and Langeskov Municipality to form a new Kerteminde Municipality. He sat in this new municipality's municipal council from 2006 to 2011.

Johansen was first elected into parliament in the 2011 election. He was reelected in 2015 and 2019.
