= Victoria Velásquez =

Danish politician (born 1991)

Victoria Velasquez
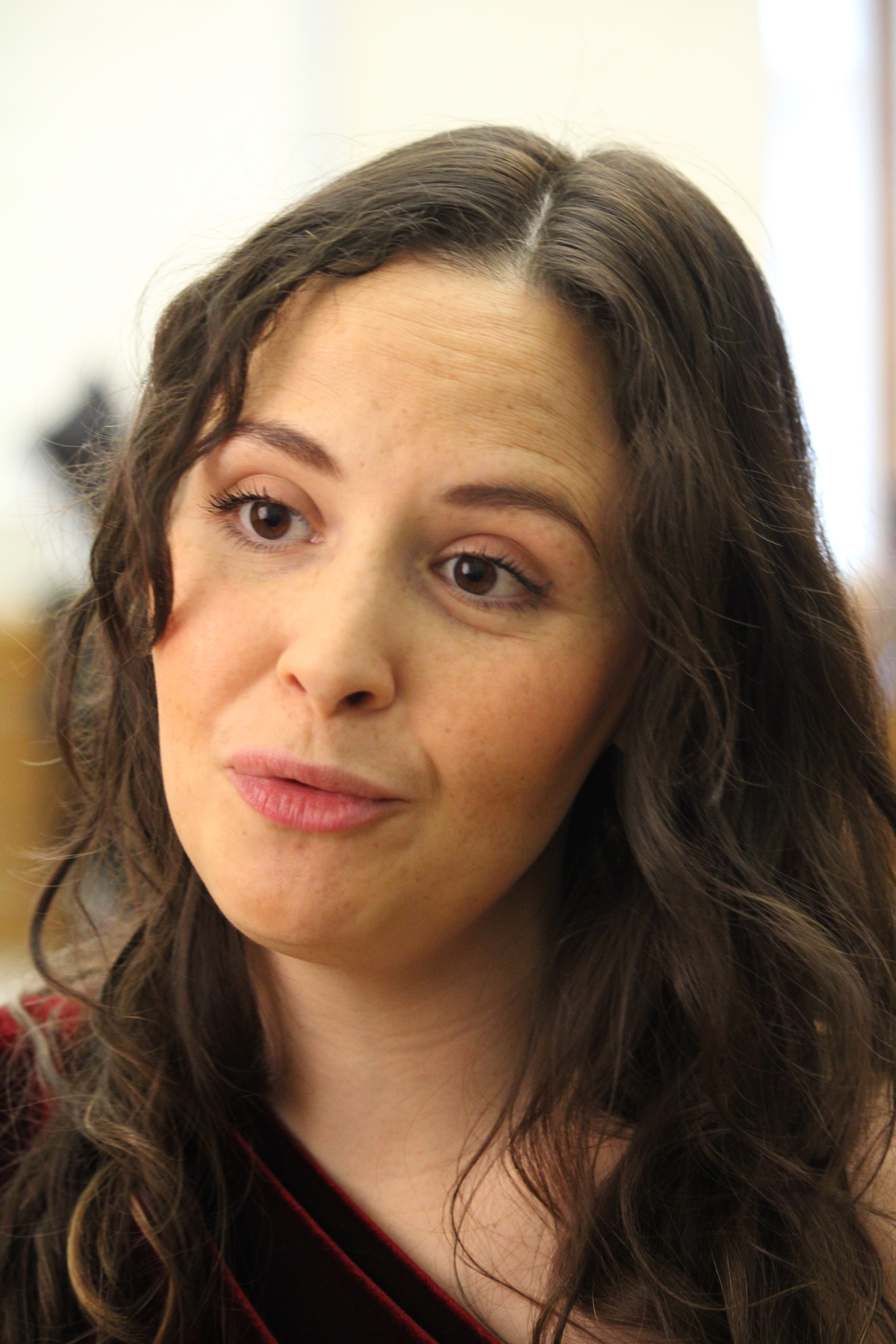
- Velásquez in 2026

Member of the Folketing
- Incumbent
- Assumed office 5 June 2019
- Constituency: Fyn

Personal details
- Born: 18 July 1991 (age 34) Copenhagen, Denmark
- Party: Red–Green Alliance
- Other political affiliations: People's Movement against the EU (formerly)

Ninosca Victoria Risbjerg Velásquez (born 18 July 1991) is a Danish politician, who is a member of the Folketing for the Red–Green Alliance political party. She was elected at the 2019 Danish general election.

== Political career ==
Velasquez stood in the 2014 European Parliament election for the People's Movement against the EU but was not elected. She ran in the 2019 election for national parliament and was elected for the Red-Green Alliance.

She is the 10th candidate for the Red–Green Alliance at the 2024 European Parliament election in Denmark.

In 2025 Velásquez sailed with the Thousand Madleens flotilla in an attempt to bring aid into Gaza during the blockade of the Strip. Her ship was stopped by the Israeli military in international waters, after which she was briefly detained by Israel.
