= Sara Emil Baaring =

Danish politician (born 1986)

Member of the Folketing
- In office 1 November 2022 – 24 March 2026
- Constituency: Funen

Personal details
- Born: Sara Andersen; 11 October 1986 (age 39) Verninge, Denmark
- Party: Social Democrats
- Education: University College Lillebaelt
- Website: stemsara.dk

Sara Emil Baaring (née Andersen; born 11 October 1986) is a Danish politician and former Member of the Folketing. A Social Democrat, she represented Funen from November 2022 to March 2026.

Emil Baaring was born on 11 October 1986 in Verninge. She is the daughter of carpenter Mogens Andersen and social education worker Suzanne Baaring Rasmussen. She has a degree in teaching from University College Lillebaelt (2017). She studied education at University College South Denmark between 2020 and 2022. She taught at Verninge Skole from 2014 to 2022. She was a member of the municipal council in Assens Municipality from 2010 to 2022.

Emil Baaring is married to Mark Emil Baaring and has two children.

Electoral history of Sara Emil Baaring
Election	Constituency	Party	Votes	Result
2009 local	Assens Municipality	Social Democrats	286	Elected
2013 local	Assens Municipality	Social Democrats	204	Elected
2017 local	Assens Municipality	Social Democrats	244	Elected
2021 local	Assens Municipality	Social Democrats	627	Elected
2022 general	Funen	Social Democrats	5,247	Elected
2026 general	Funen	Social Democrats	3,641	Not elected
