= Rosa Eriksen =

Danish politician (born 1990)

Member of the Folketing
- Incumbent
- Assumed office 1 November 2022
- Constituency: Funen

Personal details
- Born: 26 February 1990 (age 36) Holbæk, Region Zealand, Denmark
- Party: Moderates
- Occupation: Politician

Rosa Eriksen (born 26 February 1990 in Holbæk) is a Danish politician, former reality TV star and Member of the Folketing for Funen from the Moderates. Alongside sixteen other members of The Moderates, Eriksen was elected to the Folketing in November 2022.

She trained to be a Nurse at Odense University, qualifying in 2016. She was employed as a nurse at Odense University Hospital 2016-2022.

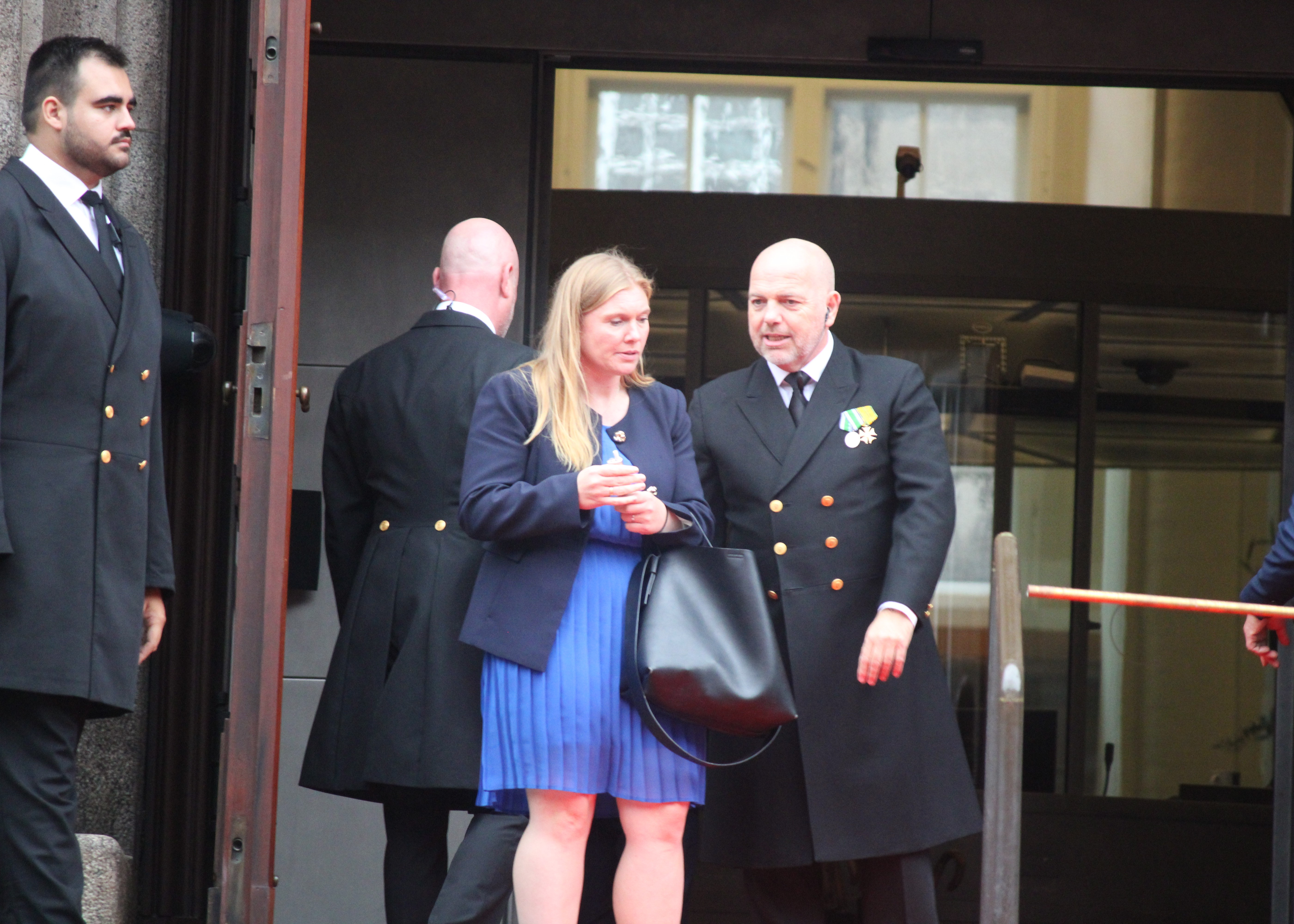
Eriksen at the 2025 opening of the Danish parliament

== See also ==
- List of members of the Folketing, 2022–present
