= Vejle Amts Avis =

Former regional newspaper based in Vejle, Denmark

Vejle Amts Avis was a regional newspaper based in Vejle, Denmark, the paper covered the former Vejle County and officially supported the Conservative People's Party while Vejle Amts Folkeblad supported Venstre.

== History ==
Vejle Amts Avis was founded in 1828 by Sylveste Hertz (1790-854) in association with the publishing house later known as Schweitzers Bogtrykkeri.

== See also ==
- Vejle Amts Folkeblad
