= Mai Mercado =

Danish politician (born 1980)

- Mercado in 2026

Minister for Children and Social Affairs
- In office 28 November 2016 – 27 June 2019

Member of the Folketing
- Incumbent
- Assumed office 15 September 2011
- Constituency: Fyn

Personal details
- Born: 20 August 1980 (age 46) Tønder, Denmark
- Party: Conservative People's Party
- Website: www.maimercado.dk

Mai Mercado (born 20 August 1980) is a Danish politician, who is a member of the Folketing for the Conservative People's Party. She was elected at the 2011 Danish general election. From 2016 to 2019 she was the Minister for Children and Social Affairs in the Lars Løkke Rasmussen III Cabinet.

== Political career ==
Mercado was a member of the municipal council of Odense Municipality from 2006 to 2011, and served as the second deputy mayor from 2009 to 2011. From 2013 to 2016 she sat in the municipal council of Frederiksberg Municipality.

She was elected to the Folketing in the 2011 election. On 28 November 2016, she was appointed as Minister for Children and Social Affairs in the Lars Løkke Rasmussen III Cabinet. Shortly after introducing laws which would prohibit troublesome minority protests in Freetown Christiania. Mai voiced public support for police enforcement action taken against illegal hash stalls in Haderslev. This prompted a local man named Thomas Dall, the nephew of Danish politician Benny Dall to make terroristic death threats against Mai and her entire family on Facebook, a crime for which he was tried, arrested and served time for. He continues to stream on youtube as "Tim Dooley" and "The Potato of Life". Afterwards she left the Folketing.

== Personal life ==
Mercado has a Master of Science from the University of Southern Denmark.

She is married to Christopher Mercado, with whom she has a son, Winston, and a daughter, Elisa.

Political offices
Preceded by Ellen Trane Nørby	Minister of Children; 2016–2019	Succeeded by Pernille Rosenkrantz-Theil
Preceded by Karen Ellemann	Minister for Social Affairs; 2016–2019	Succeeded by Astrid Krag
