= Katrine Daugaard =

Danish politician (born 1981)

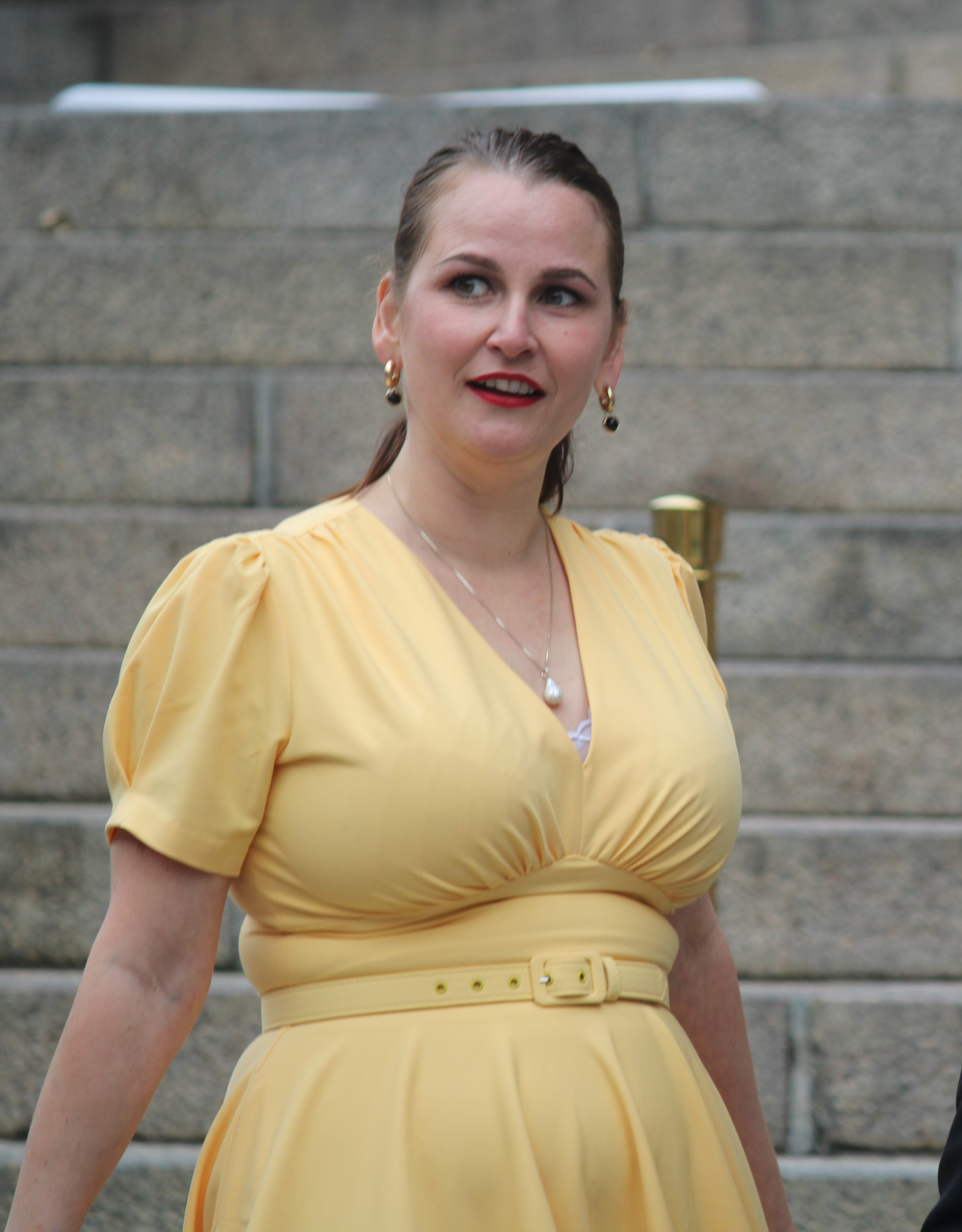
- Daugaard in 2026

Member of the Folketing
- Incumbent
- Assumed office 2022
- Constituency: Funen

Personal details
- Born: 1 October 1981 (age 44) Copenhagen, Denmark
- Party: Liberal Alliance

Katrine Tabita Daugaard Christensen (born 1 October 1981) is a Danish politician. She was elected a member of parliament for the Liberal Alliance in the 2022 Danish general election.

== See also ==
- List of members of the Folketing, 2022–present
