= Amanda Heitmann =

Danish politician (born 1998)

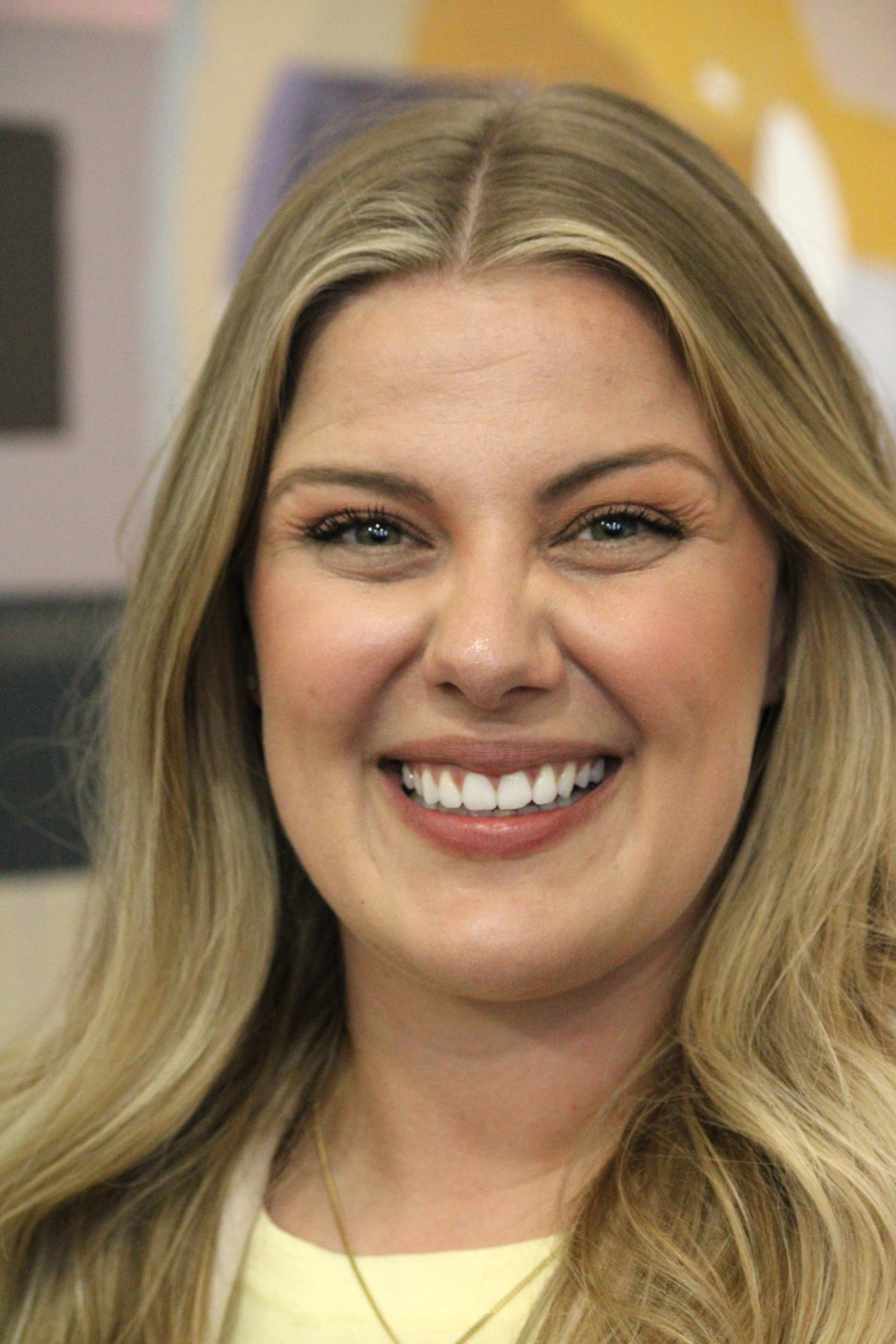
- Heitmann in 2026

Member of the Folketing
- Incumbent
- Assumed office 24 March 2026
- Constituency: Funen

Personal details
- Born: 27 February 1998 (age 28) Svendborg, Denmark
- Party: Venstre

Amanda Heitmann (born 27 February 1998) is a Danish politician who was elected member of the Folketing in 2026. She previously served as staff coordinator for Asger Christensen.
