= Kim Aas =

Danish politician (born 1970)

Member of the Folketing
- In office 1 November 2022 – 24 March 2026
- Constituency: Funen

Personal details
- Born: 15 June 1970 (age 56) Faaborg, Denmark
- Party: Social Democrats
- Education: Aarhus University

Kim Aas Christensen (born 15 June 1970) is a Danish politician and former Member of the Folketing. A Social Democrat, he represented Funen from November 2022 to March 2026. He was a substitute member of the Folketing for Tanja Larsson between October 2021 and January 2022.

Aas was born on 15 June 1970 in Faaborg. He is the son of foreman Gustav Aas Christensen and Margit Østergaard Christensen. He has a Bachelor of Arts degree in theology from Aarhus University (1999). He studied teaching at Skaarup Seminarium (2001–2005). He was a teacher (2005–2017), school co-ordinator (2017–2018) and a crime prevention consultant for Faaborg-Midtfyn Municipality (2018–2022). He was a member of the municipal council in Faaborg-Midtfyn Municipality from 2013 to 2022.

Electoral history of Kim Aas
Election	Constituency	Party	Votes	Result
2013 local	Faaborg-Midtfyn Municipality	Social Democrats	290	Elected
2017 local	Faaborg-Midtfyn Municipality	Social Democrats	524	Elected
2019 general	Funen	Social Democrats	4,234	Not elected
2021 local	Faaborg-Midtfyn Municipality	Social Democrats	449	Elected
2022 general	Funen	Social Democrats	2,337	Elected
2026 general	Funen	Social Democrats	2,084	Not elected
