= Bjørn Brandenborg =

Danish politician

Member of the Folketing
- Incumbent
- Assumed office 5 June 2019
- Constituency: Funen

Personal details
- Born: 10 December 1991 (age 34) Svendborg, Denmark
- Party: Social Democrats

Bjørn Brandenborg (born 10 December 1991) is a Danish politician who is a member of the Folketing for the Social Democrats political party. He was elected into the Folketing in the 2019 Danish general election.

== Political career ==
Brandenborg first ran for parliament in the 2019 election, where he received 6,837 votes and won a seat in parliament. Brandenborg was re-elected in 2022 with 11,167 personal votes.

== Personal life ==
He grew up in Denmark to a Faroese mother and Danish father. Faroese handball player Pernille Brandenborg is his younger sister.
