= Alex Ahrendtsen =

Danish politician

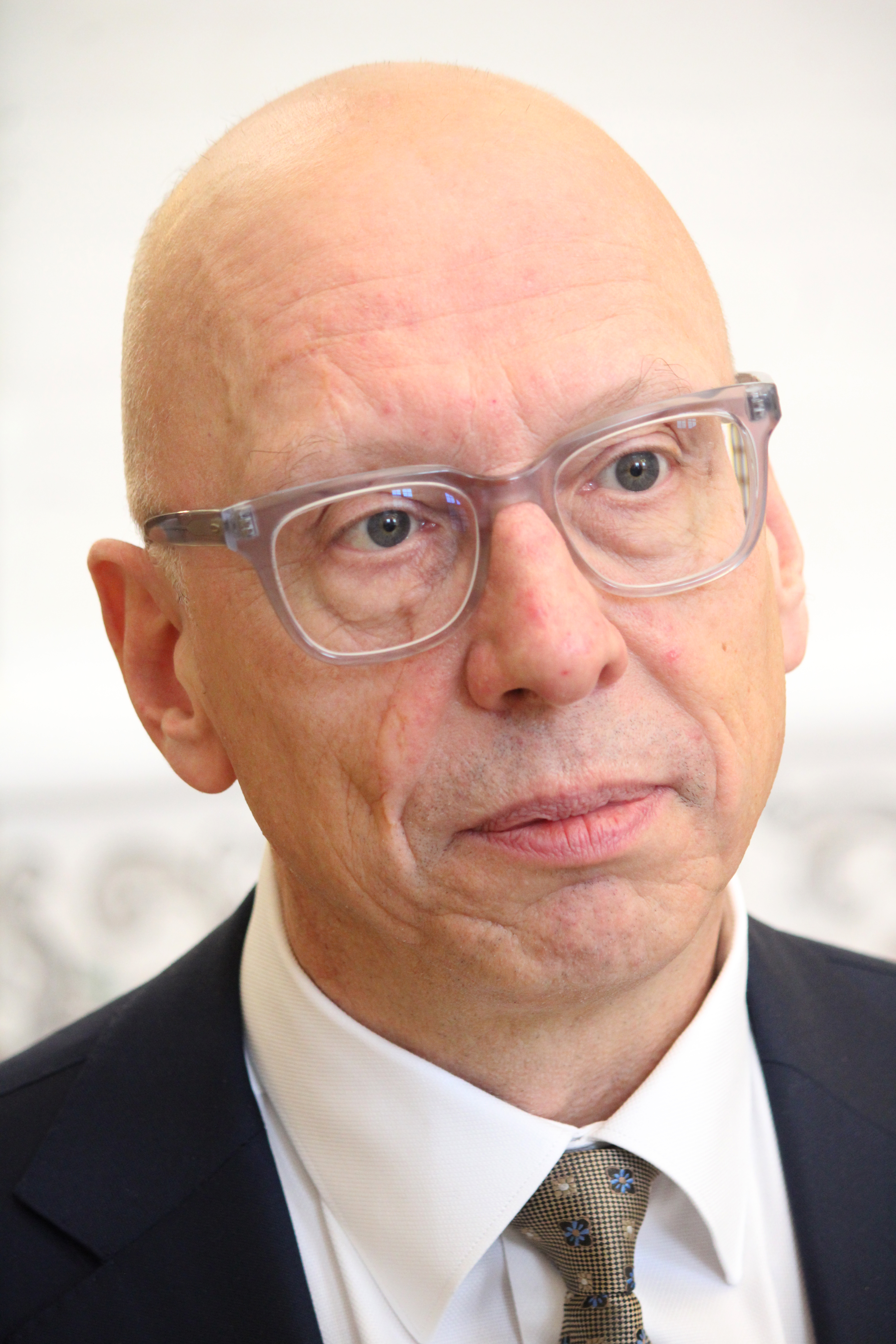
- Ahrendtsen in 2026

Member of the Folketing
- Incumbent
- Assumed office 15 September 2011
- Constituency: Funen

Personal details
- Born: 14 February 1967 (age 59) Kolding, Denmark
- Party: Danish People's Party
- Education: Odense University

Alex Ahrendtsen (born 14 February 1967) is a Danish politician, who is a member of the Folketing for the Danish People's Party. He was elected into parliament at the 2011 Danish general election.

== Political career ==
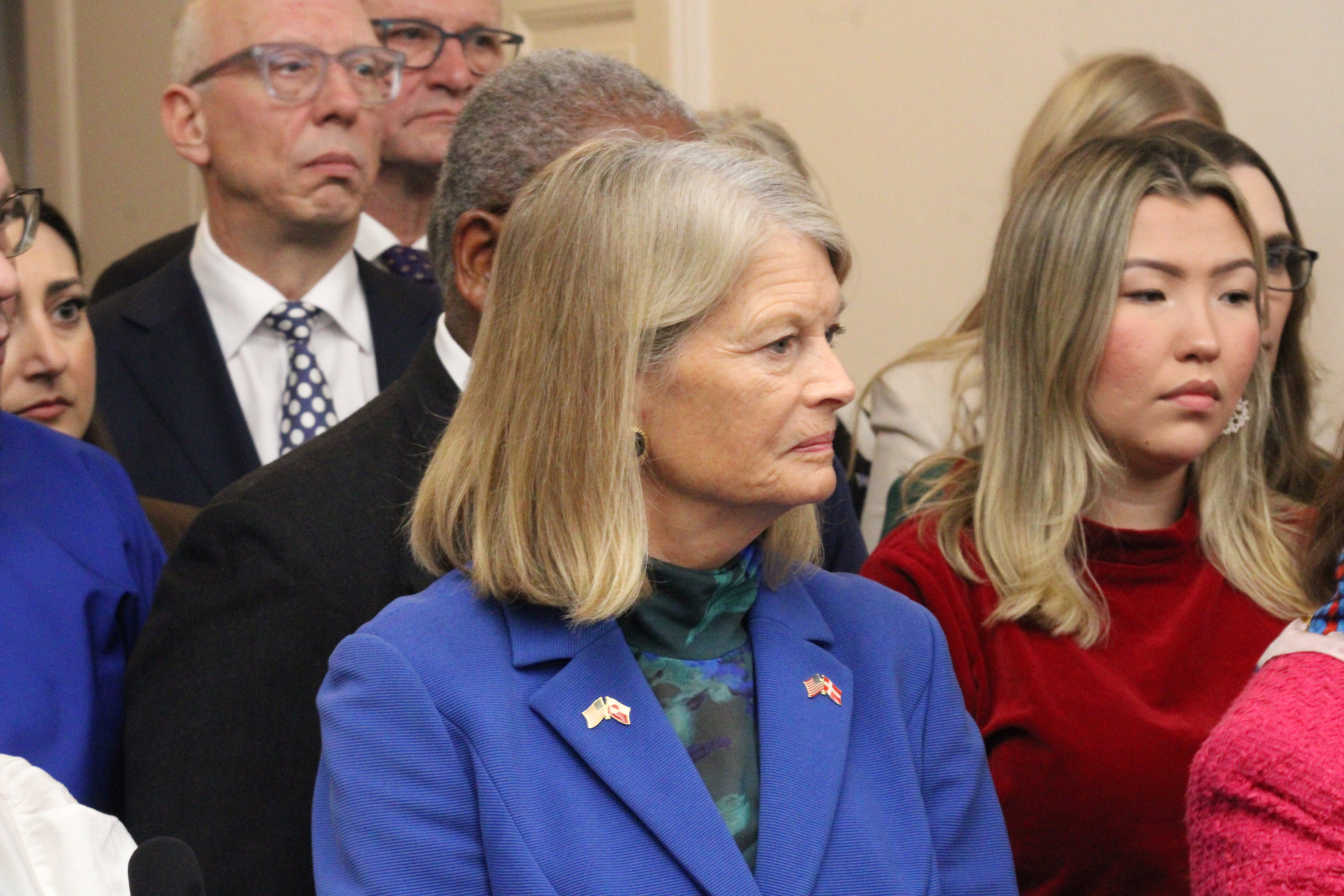
Ahrendtsen with Lisa Murkowski at a press conference on the Greenland crisis, January 2026

Ahrendtsen was in the municipal council of Odense Municipality from 2006 to 2017. He was first elected into the Folketing in the 2011 general election, where he received 2,462 personal votes. He was reelected in the 2015 election with 4,996 personal votes, and again in the 2019 election with 2,656 personal votes. In 2023, Ahrendtsen published a book about rindalism titled Rindal: Kampen mod kultureliten og velfærdsstaten (Rindal: The struggle against the cultural elite and the welfare state).
