= Thomas Skriver Jensen =

Danish politician (born 1996)

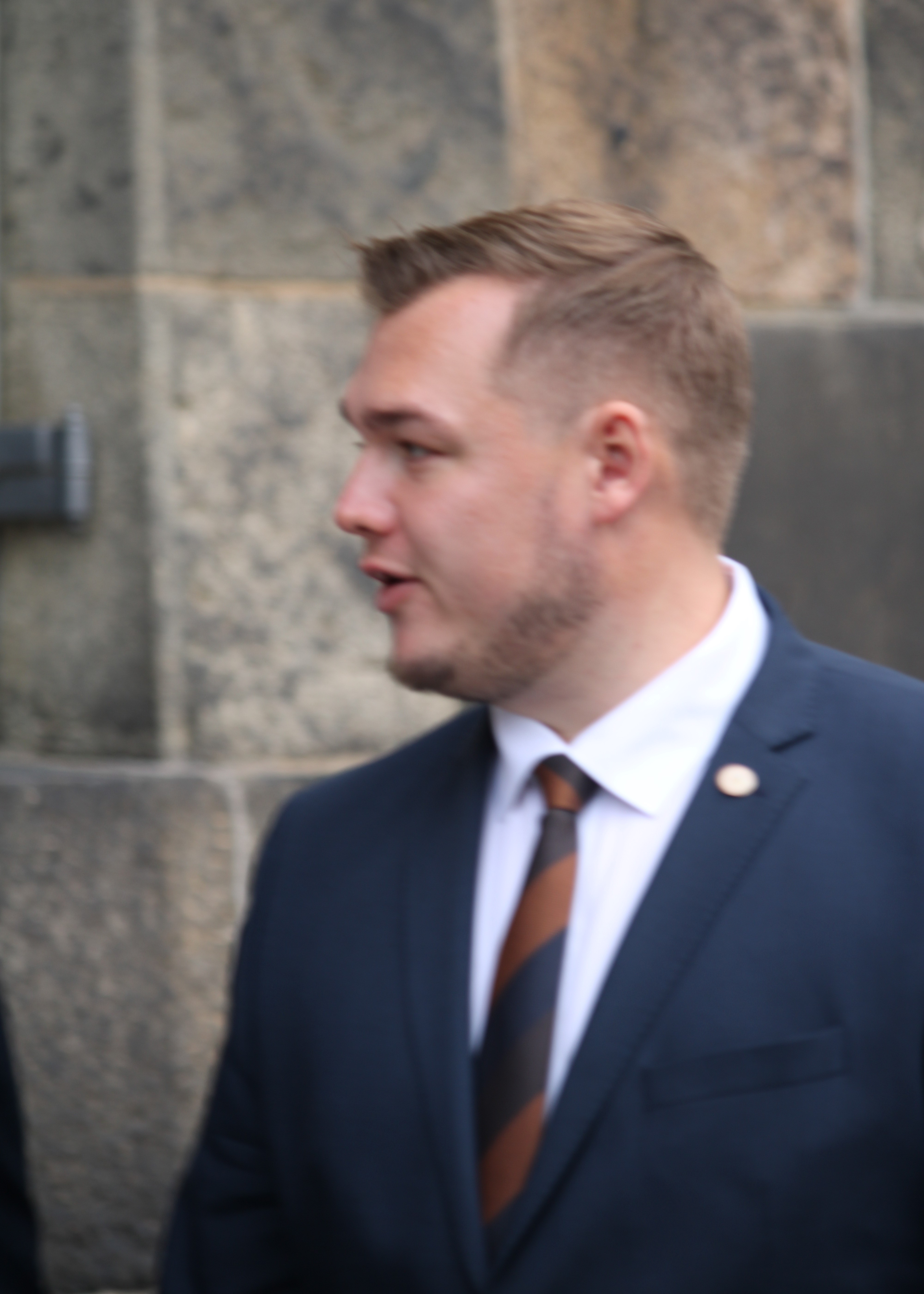
- Skriver Jensen in 2025

Member of the Folketing
- Incumbent
- Assumed office 1 November 2022

Personal details
- Born: 27 March 1996 (age 30) Odense, Denmark
- Party: Social Democrats
- Occupation: Politician

Thomas Skriver Jensen (born 27 March 1996) is a Danish politician who has been a member of the Folketing for the Social Democrats since 2022.

== See also ==
- List of members of the Folketing, 2022–present
