= Carsten Hansen =

Danish politician

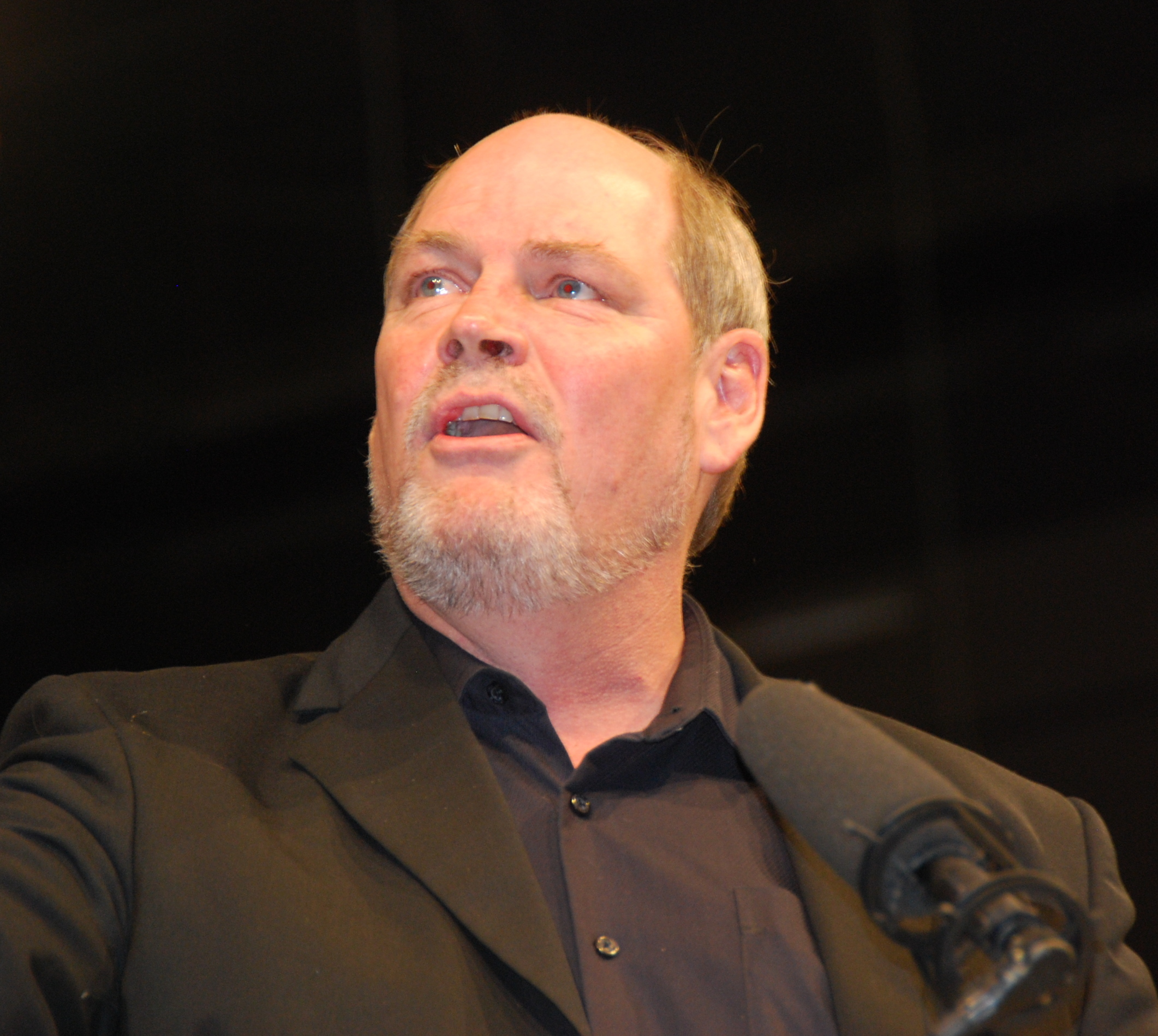
Carsten Hansen, January 2011 (Photo: Lars Schmidt.)

Carsten Mogens Hansen (born 10 January 1957) is a Danish Social Democrat politician. He has been a member of the Folketing—the parliament of Denmark—since 1998. He was formerly the Minister for the city, Housing and Rural Affairs in the Thorning-Schmidt I Cabinet and the Thorning-Schmidt II Cabinet.
