= Vejle Amts Folkeblad =

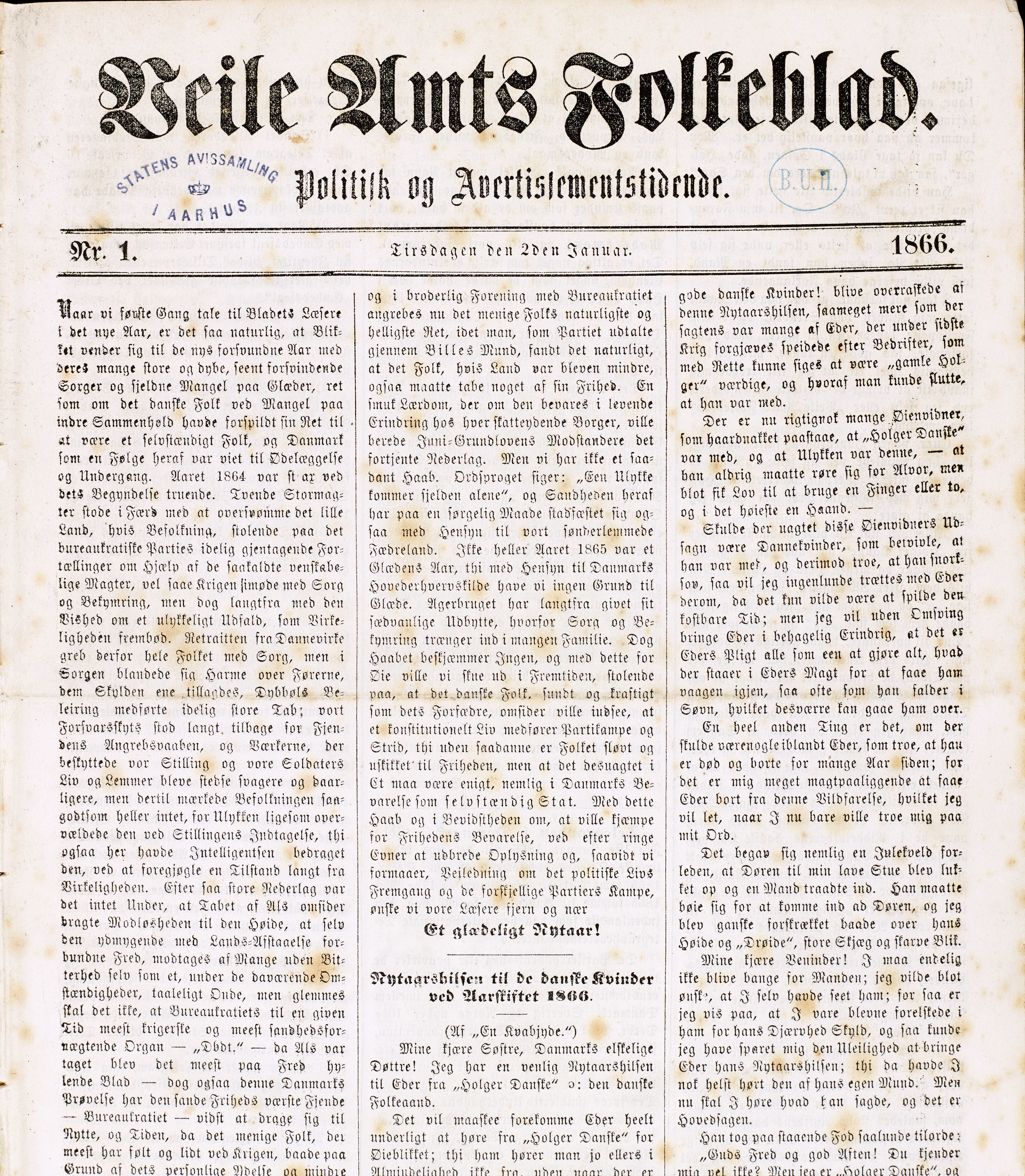
Vejle Amts Folkeblad 1866 front page

Vejle Amts Folkeblad is a regional Danish newspaper. It is now published by Jysk Fynske Medier.

== History ==
The newspaper was first published on 20 October 1865 by Thomas Nielsen. Later that year, H Kleine bought the newspaper and the associated printing business from Nielsen. After Kleine's death in 1868, his widow published the paper for one year.

In 1869, Nielsen and editor A. K. Jensen bought the paper. Jensen retired in 1882. After Nielsen's death in 1895, the paper was published by a joint stock company. In 1892, Chr. Søndergaard became editor in chief. He was succeeded in 1933 by A. W. Johannessen. In 1940, G. Skytte Nielsen became editor-in-chief.

== See also ==
- Vejle Amts Avis
