= Thorning-Schmidt II Cabinet =

Government of Denmark from 2014 to 2015

Thorning-Schmidt Cabinet II
- 75th Cabinet of Denmark

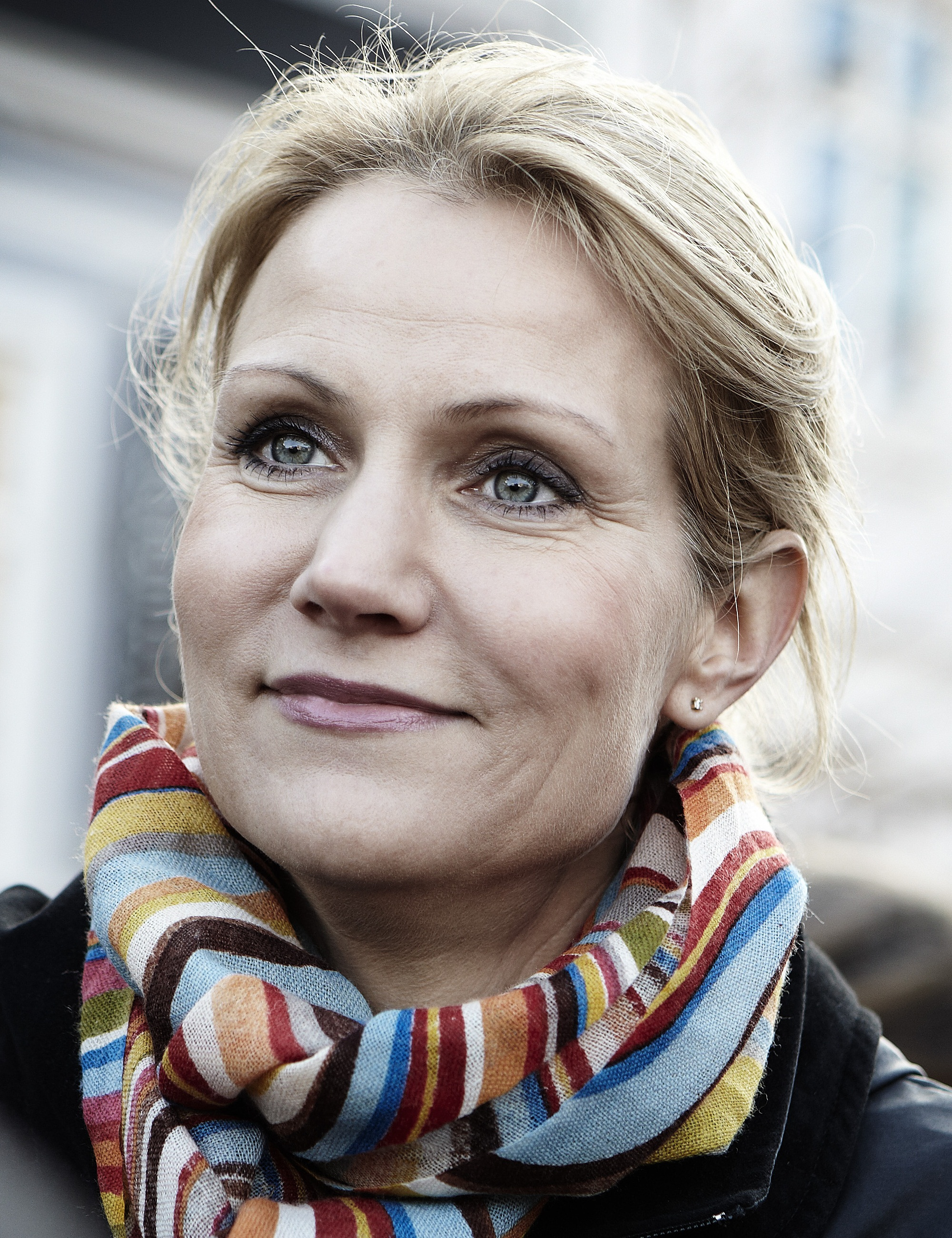
- Date formed: 3 February 2014
- Date dissolved: 28 June 2015

People and organisations
- Head of state: Margrethe II of Denmark
- Head of government: Helle Thorning-Schmidt
- No. of ministers: 20
- Member parties: Social Democrats; Social Liberals; Supported by: Green Left; Red-Green Alliance
- Status in legislature: Minority coalition government
- Opposition parties: Venstre; Danish People's Party; Liberal Alliance; Conservatives; Alternative

History
- Outgoing formation: 2015 general election
- Election: —
- Legislature term: 2011–2015
- Predecessor: Thorning-Schmidt I
- Successor: L. L. Rasmussen II

The Second Cabinet of Helle Thorning-Schmidt was the Government of Denmark in office from 3 February 2014 to 28 June 2015. It was a coalition government between the Social Democrats and the Social Liberal Party.

It was preceded by the First Cabinet of Helle Thorning-Schmidt, a cabinet that ended when the Socialist People's Party left the government.

== Government formations ==
Helle Thorning-Schmidt formed the First Cabinet of Helle Thorning-Schmidt following the 2011 parliamentary election and lead a coalition government consisting of her own Social Democrats, the Social Liberal Party and the Socialist People's Party until 2014.

On 30 January 2014, the Socialist People's Party announced their departure from the government due to a conflict over the proposed sale of DONG Energy shares to Goldman Sachs. Before departure, they also announced they will support Helle Thorning-Schmidt although not being a part of her government.

This event lead to the resignation of the First Cabinet of Helle Thorning-Schmidt and the formation of the Second Cabinet of Helle Thorning-Schmidt on 3 February 2014.

The Second Cabinet of Thorning-Schmidt resigned following defeat in the 2015 general election.

== List of ministers ==
The Social Democrats had thirteen ministers including the Prime Minister. The Social Liberal Party had seven ministers.

Portfolio	Minister	Took office	Left office	Party
Prime Minister	Helle Thorning-Schmidt	3 February 2014	28 June 2015	Social Democrats
Minister of Economy and the Interior	Margrethe Vestager	3 February 2014	2 September 2014	Social Liberals
Minister of Economy and the Interior	Morten Østergaard	2 September 2014	28 June 2015	Social Liberals
Minister for Foreign Affairs	Martin Lidegaard	3 February 2014	28 June 2015	Social Liberals
Minister of Trade and Development Cooperation	Mogens Jensen	3 February 2014	28 June 2015	Social Democrats
Minister for Finance	Bjarne Corydon	3 February 2014	28 June 2015	Social Democrats
Minister for Justice	Karen Hækkerup	3 February 2014	10 October 2014	Social Democrats
Minister for Justice	Mette Frederiksen	10 October 2014	28 June 2015	Social Democrats
Minister for Defence	Nicolai Wammen	3 February 2014	28 June 2015	Social Democrats
Minister for Culture and Ecclesiastical Affairs	Marianne Jelved	3 February 2014	28 June 2015	Social Liberals
Minister for Taxation	Morten Østergaard	3 February 2014	2 September 2014	Social Liberals
Minister for Taxation	Benny Engelbrecht	2 September 2014	28 June 2015	Social Democrats
Minister of Higher Education and Science	Sofie Carsten Nielsen	3 February 2014	28 June 2015	Social Liberals
Minister of Business Affairs and Growth	Henrik Sass Larsen	3 February 2014	28 June 2015	Social Democrats
Minister for the City, Housing and Rural Affairs	Carsten Hansen	3 February 2014	28 June 2015	Social Democrats
Minister for Employment	Mette Frederiksen	3 February 2014	10 October 2014	Social Democrats
Minister for Employment	Henrik Dam Kristensen	10 October 2014	28 June 2015	Social Democrats
Minister for Education	Christine Antorini	3 February 2014	28 June 2015	Social Democrats
Minister for Integration and Social Affairs	Manu Sareen	3 February 2014	28 June 2015	Social Liberals
Minister for Food, Agriculture and Fisheries	Dan Jørgensen	3 February 2014	28 June 2015	Social Democrats
Minister for Climate and Energy	Rasmus Helveg Petersen	3 February 2014	28 June 2015	Social Liberals
Minister for Transport	Magnus Heunicke	3 February 2014	28 June 2015	Social Democrats
Minister for Health and Prevention	Nick Hækkerup	3 February 2014	28 June 2015	Social Democrats
Minister for the Environment	Kirsten Brosbøl	3 February 2014	28 June 2015	Social Democrats

Preceded by Thorning-Schmidt I	Cabinet of Denmark; 2014–2015	Succeeded by Løkke Rasmussen II
