= Anne Baastrup =

Danish politician (born 1952)

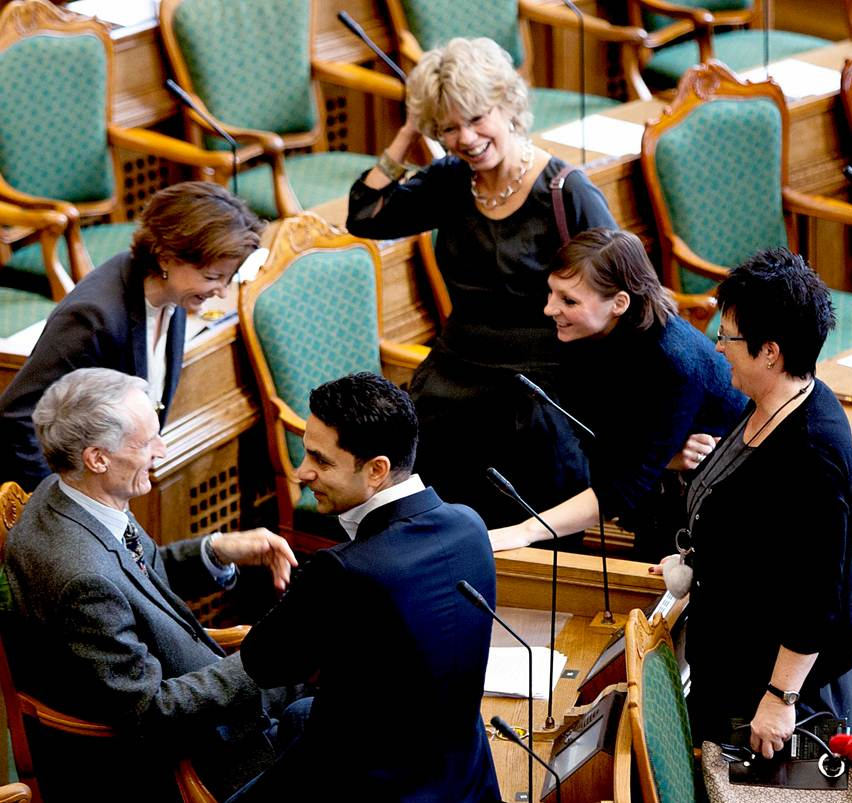

Member of the Folketing
- In office 13 November 2007 – 18 June 2015
- In office 21 September 1994 – 20 November 2001

Personal details
- Born: 7 April 1952 (age 74) Aalborg, Denmark
- Party: Socialist People's Party
- Education: Aalborghus Gymnasium

Anne Baastrup (born 7 April 1952) is a Danish politician and was a member of the Folketing. She has served multiple times: in the 1994 Danish general election and the 1998 general election, serving from 1994 to 2001, and then in the 2007 general election and the 2011 general election, serving from 2007 to 2015.

== Background ==
Baastrup was born in 1952 in Aalborg, daughter of office manager Jørgen Baastrup and business owner Inger Baastrup. She graduated from Aalborghus Statsgymnasium in 1970 and Candidate of Law from University of Copenhagen in 1976. She is married, has three children and six grandchildren and lives in Copenhagen and Bogense.

Baastrup has a career as a civil servant and in the trade union movement. She was employed as a clerk in the Local Government Association from 1976 until 1980, when she moved to a position in the Danish Parliament as committee secretary. In 1987, she moved to a position as an administrator in the Gender Equality Council. Since 1989, she has been union secretary at FTF.

== Political career ==
Baastrup joined the SF (Socialist People's Party) in 1987. For a number of years she was active in Copenhagen's school politics. She was a member of the SF-Københavns school committee 1988–93, chairman of the school board and member of the board of Bellahøj School 1988–92, chairman of the Joint Council for Public Schools in Copenhagen 1990–92 and of Skole og Samfund's executive committee in Copenhagen 1990–92.

She became a member of SF's main board in 1992 and continued as a member until 2001.

In 1994, Baastrup was nominated as a parliamentary candidate in the Køge district. In the Parliamentary election of 21 September 1994, she was elected on an additional mandate in Roskilde County with 2,404 personal votes.

In 1999 she changed constituency to Odense Østkredsen.

In the Danish Parliament, Baastrup was chairman of the Legal Affairs Committee from 2001 to 2005 and again from 2011 to 2012. Between 1998 and 2001, and again between 2005 and 2010, she was its vice-chairman. As chairman of the Legal Affairs Committee, she was responsible for the appointment of former Attorney General Jørgen Steen Sørensen, as the new Ombudsman, replacing Hans Gammeltoft Hansen.

Baastrup is the party's social spokesperson. She has previously been health spokesperson, education spokesperson, working environment spokesperson, disability and psychiatry spokesperson, citizenship spokesperson and traffic spokesperson.

She has participated in the preparation of various programmes and discussion papers, such as the discussion paper "More Society – Less State", SF's various election programmes and all programmes concerning integration and EF/EU since 1993.

In May 2008, in a ballot against mayor Bo Asmus Kjeldgaard, she lost the battle to become the party's lead candidate in Copenhagen Municipality. She then announced that she would not stand for re-election to the Danish Parliament. She later announced that she intended to seek re-election anyway.

Baastrup lists "growth, jobs and education", "public transport" and "people with disabilities" as her key issue. She wants "massive investment in education" and the expansion of public transport.
