= Merete Riisager =

Danish politician (born 1976)

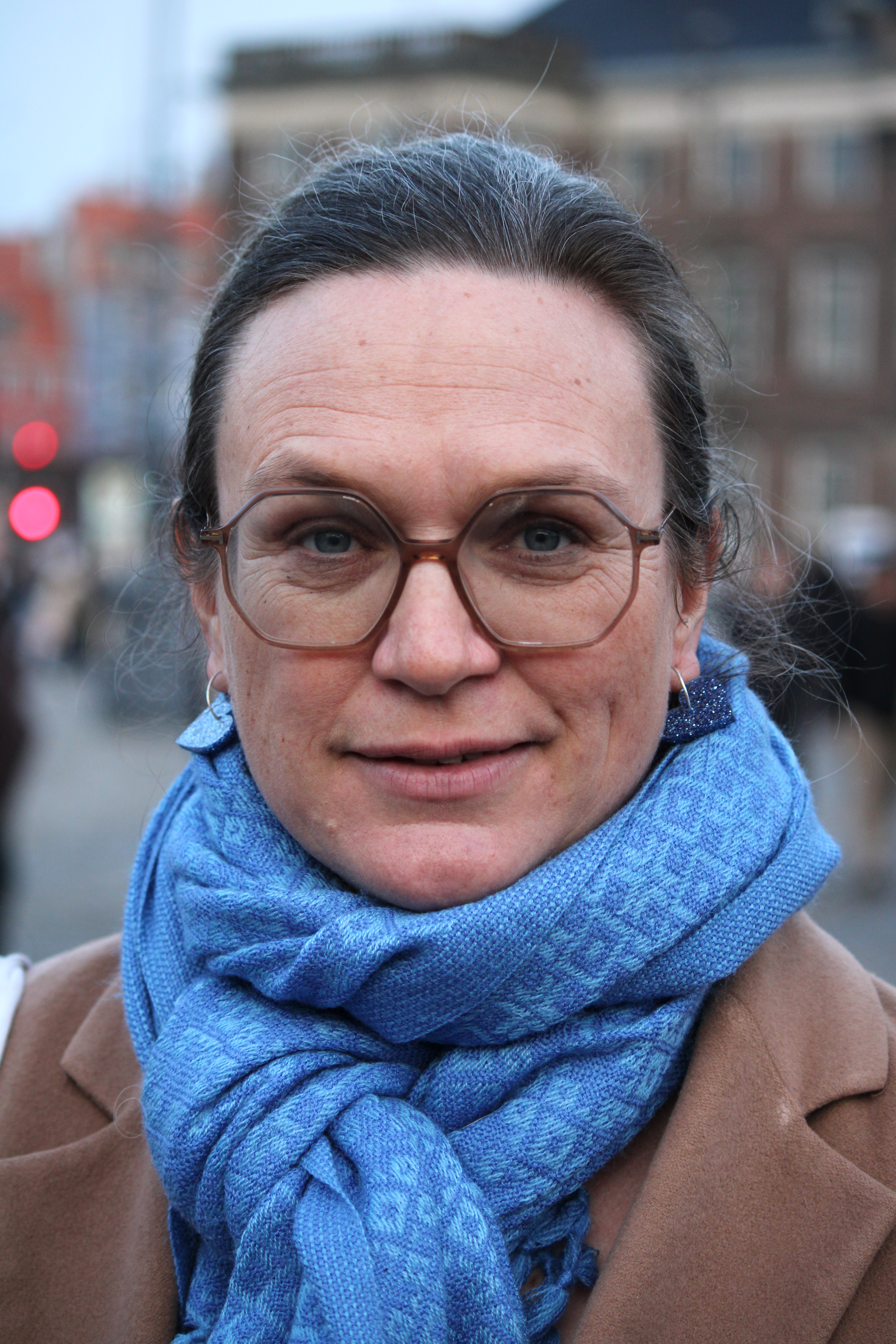
Riisager in 2026

Merete Riisager Andersen (born 1 March 1976) is a Danish politician who represents the Liberal Alliance. From 28 November 2016 to 27 June 2019, she was Education Minister of Denmark, replacing Ellen Trane Nørby.

Born in Aarhus, Riisager graduated from the University of Copenhagen with a master's degree in pedagogy in 2003. She has worked in the field of learning in a number of companies, including LEGO, before she was elected to the Folketing (the Danish parliament) in 2011 for the Liberal Alliance. Between 2006 and 2010, Riisager was a candidate to the Folketing for the Danish Social Liberal Party in Odense.
