= 2015 Danish general election =

- 18 June 2015
- All 179 seats in the Folketing; 90 seats needed for a majority
- Turnout: 85.89% (▼1.85 pp)
Party	Leader	Vote %	Seats	+/–
Elected in Denmark
Social Democrats	Helle Thorning-Schmidt	26.28	47	+3
DPP	Kristian Thulesen Dahl	21.08	37	+15
Venstre	Lars Løkke Rasmussen	19.47	34	−13
Red–Green	Johanne Schmidt-Nielsen (Note: Formally, the Red-Green Alliance have collective leadership, but Schmidt-Nielsen was their political spokesperson, and de facto leader of the party.)	7.80	14	+2
Liberal Alliance	Anders Samuelsen	7.53	13	+4
The Alternative	Uffe Elbæk	4.80	9	New
Social Liberals	Morten Østergaard	4.58	8	−9
SF	Pia Olsen Dyhr	4.19	7	−9
Conservatives	Søren Pape Poulsen	3.35	6	−2
Elected in the Faroe Islands
Republic	Høgni Hoydal	24.47	1	+1
Social Democratic	Sjúrður Skaale	24.27	1	0
Elected in Greenland
Inuit Ataqatigiit	Aaja Chemnitz	39.17	1	0
Siumut	Aleqa Hammond	38.87	1	0
This lists parties that won seats. See the complete results below.

Government before	Government after election
Thorning-Schmidt II; S–R	Løkke Rasmussen II; Venstre

General elections were held in the Kingdom of Denmark on 18 June 2015 to elect the 179 members of the Folketing. 175 members were elected in the Denmark proper, two in the Faroe Islands and two in Greenland. Although the ruling Social Democrats became the largest party in the Folketing and increased their seat count, the opposition Venstre party was able to form a minority government headed by Lars Løkke Rasmussen with the support of the Danish People's Party, the Liberal Alliance and the Conservative People's Party.

== Background ==
Following the 2011 general election, a minority government was formed by the Social Democrats, the Social Liberal Party and the Socialist People's Party. The government was supported by the Red–Green Alliance. Helle Thorning-Schmidt, the leader of the Social Democrats, became Prime Minister.

The government had rocky relations with the Red–Green Alliance, relying on their ad hoc support to pass bills instead of a formalized alliance. As a result, they occasionally preferred to cooperate with Venstre to pass legislation. Symbolically, Red–Green deputy Frank Aaen told Finance Minister Bjarne Corydon "Happy New Year" on 28 February 2013, because the government had failed to meet with his party since the beginning of 2013.

On 3 February 2014, the Socialist People's Party left the government in protest over the sale of shares in the public energy company DONG Energy to the investment bank Goldman Sachs. This sparked a crisis within the Socialist People's Party, as three former cabinet ministers left the party, joining either the Social Democrats or the Social Liberal Party. However, the Socialist People's Party continued to support the government on confidence motions, preventing an early election.

The incumbent government prior to the elections consisted of a coalition between the Social Democrats and Social Liberal Party, with Helle Thorning-Schmidt continuing as Prime Minister. The cabinet was composed of 14 Social Democratic ministers and 6 Social Liberal ministers.

== Electoral system ==
The 179 members of the Folketing were elected in Denmark (175), the Faroe Islands (2) and Greenland (2). The 175 seats in Denmark included 135 seats elected in ten multi-member constituencies by proportional representation, using a modified version of the Sainte-Laguë method and Hare quota, and 40 "top-up" seats, allocated to parties in order to address any imbalance in the distribution of the constituency seats.

According to the Danish Constitution, the election had to be held no later than 14 September 2015, as the last election was held on 15 September 2011. The Prime Minister was able to call the election at any date, provided it was no later than four years from the previous election, and this is often cited as a tactical advantage to the sitting government, as it can call an early election when polls are favourable. On 27 May Thorning-Schmidt announced that the elections would be held on 18 June 2015.

== Opinion polls ==
Polls notably underestimated the vote share received by the Danish People's Party.

Polling Firm	Date	V	A	O	B	F	Ø	I	C	K	Å	Lead	Red (A+B+F+Ø+Å)	Blue (V+O+I+C+K)
Gallup	17 June	20.6	25.9	18.1	5.2	5.3	8.0	7.1	3.8	1.1	4.7	5.3	49.2	50.7
Greens	17 June	20.9	24.4	18.5	5.6	5.4	8.5	7.6	3.3	0.6	5.2	3.5	49.1	50.9
Voxmeter	17 June	19.6	25.9	17.2	4.6	6.3	9.8	7.7	3.5	0.9	4.5	6.3	51.1	48.9
Epinion	17 June	20.6	24.5	18.0	5.2	5.3	9.3	7.5	3.9	0.7	4.9	4.3	49.2	50.7
Megafon	17 June	20.6	25.5	17.9	5.0	5.2	8.6	7.7	3.9	0.9	4.6	5.1	48.9	51.0

== Results ==
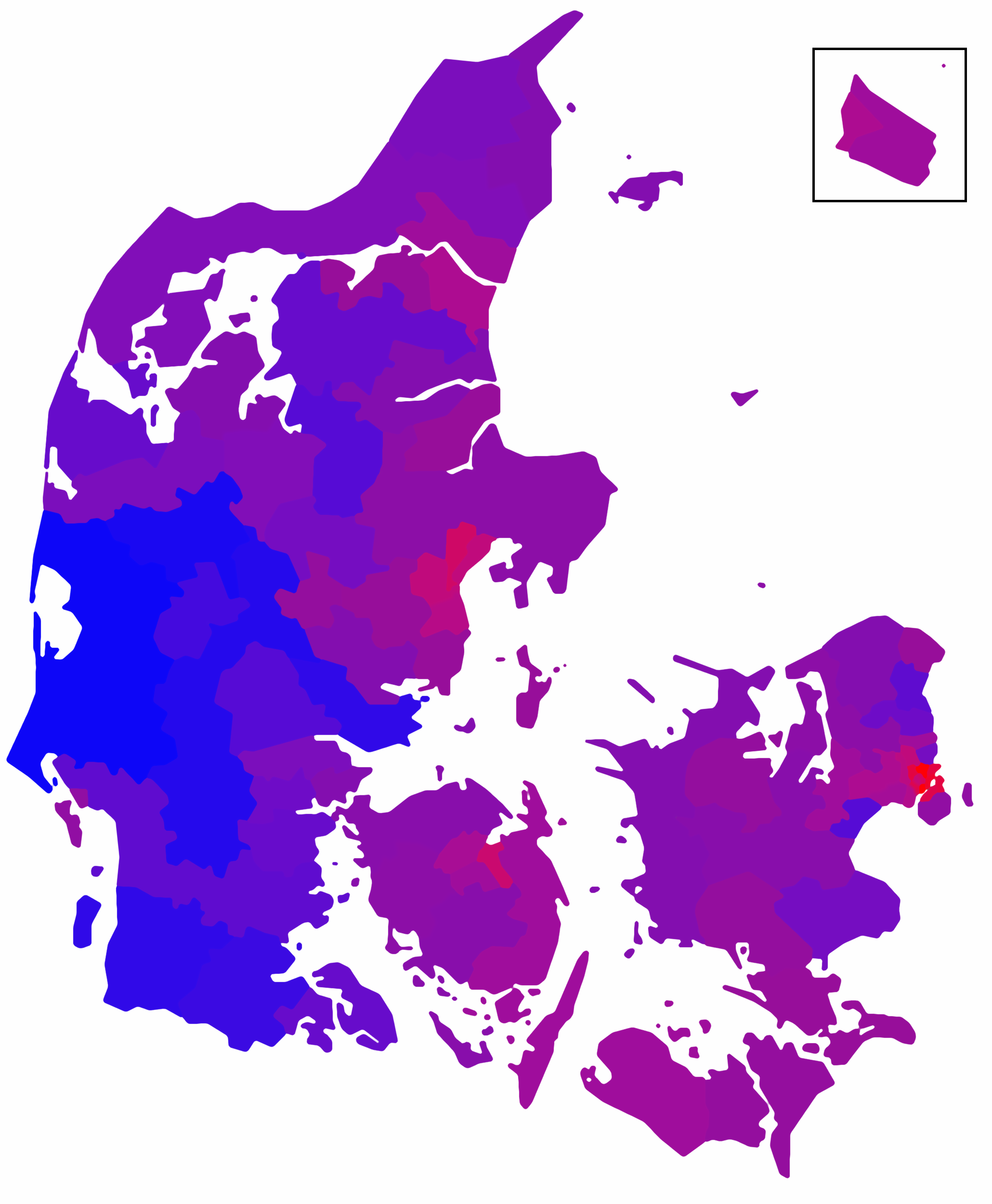
Shaded, from red (A+B+F+Å+Ø) to blue (C+I+K+O+V)

Party	Votes	%	Seats	+/–
Denmark proper
Social Democrats	924,940	26.28	47	+3
Danish People's Party	741,746	21.08	37	+15
Venstre	685,188	19.47	34	–13
Red–Green Alliance	274,463	7.80	14	+2
Liberal Alliance	265,129	7.53	13	+4
The Alternative	168,788	4.80	9	New
Danish Social Liberal Party	161,009	4.58	8	–9
Socialist People's Party	147,578	4.19	7	–9
Conservative People's Party	118,003	3.35	6	–2
Christian Democrats	29,077	0.83	0	0
Independents	3,066	0.09	0	0
Total	3,518,987	100.00	175	0
Valid votes	3,518,987	98.85		
Invalid/blank votes	41,073	1.15		
Total votes	3,560,060	100.00		
Registered voters/turnout	4,145,105	85.89		
Faroe Islands
Republic	5,718	24.47	1	+1
Social Democratic Party	5,670	24.27	1	0
Union Party	5,496	23.52	0	–1
People's Party	4,384	18.76	0	0
Progress	744	3.18	0	New
Centre Party	605	2.59	0	0
Self-Government	400	1.71	0	0
Independent	347	1.49	0	0
Total	23,364	100.00	2	0
Valid votes	23,364	99.08		
Invalid/blank votes	216	0.92		
Total votes	23,580	100.00		
Registered voters/turnout	35,607	66.22		
Greenland
Inuit Ataqatigiit	7,914	39.17	1	0
Siumut	7,854	38.87	1	0
Democrats	1,852	9.17	0	0
Atassut	1,528	7.56	0	0
Partii Naleraq	1,058	5.24	0	New
Total	20,206	100.00	2	0
Valid votes	20,206	97.67		
Invalid/blank votes	482	2.33		
Total votes	20,688	100.00		
Registered voters/turnout	41,048	50.40		
Source: DST

=== By constituency ===
Denmark
Constituency	A	O	V	Ø	I	Å	B	F	C
Copenhagen	22.3	11.4	10.3	16.4	8.8	11.2	9.4	6.5	3.1
Greater Copenhagen	29.1	20.1	14.8	8.2	8.4	4.4	5.4	4.7	4.5
North Zealand	22.6	18.8	20.6	6.3	11.4	4.5	6.1	3.9	5.3
Bornholm	33.5	19.9	20.3	8.4	4.0	5.0	1.6	2.8	1.7
Zealand	27.9	25.6	19.6	6.7	6.2	3.5	3.2	3.9	2.9
Funen	28.9	21.8	18.2	8.5	6.5	4.5	3.4	4.4	3.5
South Jutland	23.5	28.4	23.5	5.1	7.5	2.6	3.1	3.0	2.2
East Jutland	27.3	18.9	18.7	7.4	8.3	6.1	4.9	4.4	2.8
West Jutland	24.5	21.3	27.4	4.5	5.9	2.6	2.8	3.6	4.9
North Jutland	30.0	21.9	23.2	6.1	5.9	2.8	3.1	3.3	2.7
Total	26.3	21.1	19.5	7.8	7.5	4.8	4.6	4.2	3.4

== Aftermath and government formation ==
Although the Social Democrats increased their share of the vote and won the most seats for the first time since 2001, the "Blue" opposition bloc led by Venstre's Rasmussen (Venstre, Danish People's Party, Liberal Alliance, Conservative People's Party, and Christian Democrats) gained a parliamentary majority over the "Red" Social Democrat-led bloc (Social Democrats, Red–Green Alliance, The Alternative, Social Liberals, and Socialist People's Party). Within an hour of the election result being declared, Thorning-Schmidt announced her government would step down on 19 June, and that she would also resign as party leader on the same day.

In accordance with the Danish Constitution, on the day after the election each party submitted their recommendation to Queen Margrethe II for the appointment of a party to be in charge of government formation negotiations (the role of the Queen was purely formal, as her appointment had to reflect the will of the majority of the elected MPs). The submitted recommendations showed a parliamentary majority (all "blue bloc" parties) for Venstre to lead the process of government formation. The negotiation mandate was unconditional from all "blue bloc" parties, except Liberal Alliance, who initially made their support conditional on a first negotiation phase being restricted to the attempt to assemble a majority government (including all elected "blue bloc" parties). After Rasmussen had been granted this specific mandate, he invited such negotiations to begin on 20 June.

Negotiations began on 20 June, but it was not thought likely that a majority government involving all the "blue bloc" parties was possible. The Conservative People's Party indicated they would rather stay out of a government coalition.

The Danish People's Party set out four conditions for their involvement in a coalition: a Eurosceptic approach to the EU, the re-introduction of border controls, further restrictions on immigration and asylum policy, and 0.8% growth in public spending. Meanwhile, the Liberal Alliance also indicated willingness to be in a coalition, but the party supports reductions in public spending, as does Venstre.

On 21 June, Rasmussen concluded that, having tried, it would not be possible to form a majority government and he announced his intention to seek a new negotiation mandate allowing a minority government. On 28 June, Lars Løkke Rasmussen's new government assumed office with a cabinet composed solely of Venstre ministers.

== See also ==
- List of members of the Folketing, 2015–2019
