= 2021 Gladsaxe municipal election =

← 2017	16 November 2021	2025 →

All 25 seats to the Gladsaxe Municipal Council 13 seats needed for a majority
- Turnout: 32,874 (62.4%) ▼3.3pp
	First party	Second party	Third party
	A	V	C
Party	Social Democrats	Venstre	Conservatives
Last election	10 seats, 36%	5 seats, 15.1%	1 seat, 7.3%
Seats won	8	4	3
Seat change	▼2	▼1	▲2
Popular vote	10,633	4,254	3,763
Percentage	32.9%	13.2%	11.7%
Swing	▼3.1%	▼1.9%	▲4.4%
	Fourth party	Fifth party	Sixth party
	F	Ø	B
Party	Green Left	Red–Green Alliance	Social Liberals
Last election	2 seats, 10.0%	3 seats, 10.4%	2 seats, 6.9%
Seats won	3	3	2
Seat change	▲1	0	0
Popular vote	3,673	3,426	2,471
Percentage	11.4%	10.6%	7.7%
Swing	▲1.4%	▲0.2%	▲0.8%
	Seventh party	Eighth party
	L	O
Party	Lokalisten Gladsaxe	Danish People's Party
Last election	Did Not Stand	2 seats, 8,4%
Seats won	1	1
Seat change	▲1	▼1
Popular vote	1,250	1,103
Percentage	3.9%	3.4%
Swing	New	▼5.0%
Mayor before election
Trine Græse
Social Democrats
Mayor after election
Trine Græse
Social Democrats

Gladsaxe Municipality has in its history been a strong area for parties of the red bloc. In the 2019 Danish general election, it was the municipality where the bloc received the 5th highest % of votes. Locally, the Social Democrats had held the mayor's position all years from 1913 and on. (Note: the Green Left held it in July 2002, but it was not following an election and lasted only until August 2002)

In the 2017 election, the Social Democrats had won 10 seats, and kept its unbeaten streak as the largest party in the council. Trine Græse from the party would eventually become the mayor.

In this election, the Social Democrats would once again become the largest party, although they lost 2 seats. The traditional red bloc won 16 seats, and this meant Trine Græse had good chances to continue. It would eventually be confirmed that she could continue as the mayor, after the Social Democrats reached an agreement with the Social Liberals and the Green Left

== Electoral system ==
For elections to Danish municipalities, a number varying from 9 to 31 are chosen to be elected to the municipal council. The seats are then allocated using the D'Hondt method and a closed list proportional representation. Gladsaxe Municipality had 25 seats in 2021

Unlike in Danish General Elections, in elections to municipal councils, electoral alliances are allowed.

== Electoral alliances ==
=== Electoral Alliance 1 ===
Party		Political alignment
A	Social Democrats	Centre-left
B	Social Liberals	Centre to Centre-left
F	Green Left	Centre-left to Left-wing

=== Electoral Alliance 2 ===
Party		Political alignment
C	Conservatives	Centre-right
D	New Right	Right-wing to Far-right
I	Liberal Alliance	Centre-right to Right-wing
O	Danish People's Party	Right-wing to Far-right
V	Venstre	Centre-right

=== Electoral Alliance 3 ===
Party		Political alignment
K	Christian Democrats	Centre to Centre-right
L	Lokallisten Gladsaxe	Local politics
Ø	Red–Green Alliance	Left-wing to Far-Left

== Results by polling station ==
H = Sahar Aslani

Division	A	B	C	D	F	H	I	K	L	O	V	Ø
Division	%	%	%	%	%	%	%	%	%	%	%	%
Bagsværd	29.0	7.9	16.5	3.2	10.5	0.1	2.2	0.4	2.7	2.6	16.3	8.7
Hovedbiblioteket	34.9	6.5	10.0	3.5	11.7	0.1	1.6	0.4	3.8	3.6	13.3	10.6
Egegård	35.5	6.2	12.4	4.0	9.7	0.2	1.3	0.3	3.1	4.4	14.5	8.4
Grønnemose	30.5	8.6	7.8	2.4	12.1	0.3	1.1	0.4	9.2	3.9	9.1	14.7
Vadgård	33.9	7.5	12.7	4.2	9.9	0.2	1.8	0.4	2.0	3.8	13.9	9.6
Søborg	29.6	9.2	12.5	2.6	12.3	0.2	1.6	0.3	2.8	3.1	13.4	12.3
Stengård	32.6	9.6	12.7	2.2	12.3	0.1	1.4	0.4	2.4	1.8	14.6	10.1
Mørkhøj	38.3	5.3	9.7	3.5	12.5	0.2	1.3	0.7	3.1	4.5	10.5	10.3
Værebro	29.7	8.8	12.8	2.8	10.2	0.3	2.1	0.4	4.9	3.2	15.0	9.8

== Results ==
Party		Votes	%	+/-	Seats	+/-
Gladsaxe Municipality
A	Social Democrats	10,633	32.94	-3.09	8	-2
V	Venstre	4,254	13.18	-1.88	4	-1
C	Conservatives	3,763	11.66	+4.39	3	+2
F	Green Left	3,673	11.38	+1.38	3	+1
Ø	Red-Green Alliance	3,426	10.61	+0.23	3	0
B	Social Liberals	2,471	7.66	+0.80	2	0
L	Lokallisten Gladsaxe	1,250	3.87	New	1	New
O	Danish People's Party	1,103	3.42	-4.95	1	-1
D	New Right	1,010	3.13	+2.26	0	0
I	Liberal Alliance	494	1.53	-0.92	0	0
K	Christian Democrats	134	0.42	New	0	New
H	Sahar Aslani	66	0.20	New	0	New
Total		32,277	100	N/A	25	N/A
Invalid votes		161	0.31	+0.19		
Blank votes		436	0.83	-0.07		
Turnout		32,874	62.43	-3.25		
Source: valg.dk
