= 2025 Gladsaxe municipal election =

Municipal election in Denmark

← 2021	18 November 2025	2029 →

All 25 seats to the Gladsaxe municipal council 13 seats needed for a majority
- Turnout: 34,830 (65.1%) ▲2.6%
	First party	Second party	Third party
	A	F	V
Party	Social Democrats	Green Left	Venstre
Last election	8 seats, 32.9%	3 seats, 11.4%	4 seats, 13.2%
Seats won	7	4	3
Seat change	▼1	▲1	▼1
Popular vote	8,524	5,534	4,164
Percentage	24.9%	16.2%	12.2%
Swing	▼8.0%	▲4.8%	▼1.0%
	Fourth party	Fifth party	Sixth party
	Ø	B	O
Party	Red-Green Alliance	Social Liberals	Danish People's Party
Last election	3 seats, 10.6%	2 seats, 7.7%	1 seat, 3.4%
Seats won	3	3	2
Seat change	0	▲1	▲1
Popular vote	3,944	3,718	2,396
Percentage	11.5%	10.9%	7.0%
Swing	▲0.9%	▲3.2%	▲3.6%
	Seventh party	Eighth party	Ninth party
	C	I	L
Party	Conservatives	Liberal Alliance	Lokallisten Gladsaxe
Last election	3 seats, 11.7%	0 seats, 1.5%	1 seat, 3.9%
Seats won	1	1	1
Seat change	▼2	▲1	0
Popular vote	1,988	1,588	1,096
Percentage	5.8%	4.6%	3.2%
Swing	▼5.8%	▲3.1%	▼0.7%
Mayor before election
Trine Græse
Social Democrats
Mayor after election
Serdal Benli
Green Left

The 2025 Gladsaxe Municipal election was held on November 18, 2025, to elect the 25 members to sit in the regional council for the Gladsaxe Municipal council, in the period of 2026 to 2029. Serdal Benli from the Green Left, would win the mayoral position.

== Background ==
Following the 2021 election, Trine Græse from Social Democrats became mayor for her second term. She would run for a third term.

== Electoral system ==
For elections to Danish municipalities, a number varying from 9 to 31 are chosen to be elected to the municipal council. The seats are then allocated using the D'Hondt method and a closed list proportional representation. Gladsaxe Municipality had 25 seats in 2025.

== Electoral alliances ==
=== Electoral Alliance 1 ===
Party		Political alignment
A	Social Democrats	Centre-left
F	Green Left	Centre-left to Left-wing
M	Moderates	Centre to Centre-right

=== Electoral Alliance 2 ===
Party		Political alignment
B	Social Liberals	Centre to Centre-left
L	Lokallisten Gladsaxe	Local politics
Ø	Red-Green Alliance	Left-wing to Far-Left

=== Electoral Alliance 3 ===
Party		Political alignment
C	Conservatives	Centre-right
V	Venstre	Centre-right

=== Electoral Alliance 4 ===
Party		Political alignment
I	Liberal Alliance	Centre-right to Right-wing
O	Danish People's Party	Right-wing to Far-right
Æ	Denmark Democrats	Right-wing to Far-right

== Results by polling station ==
Division	A	B	C	F	I	L	M	O	V	Æ	Ø
Division	%	%	%	%	%	%	%	%	%	%	%
Bagsværd	20.7	11.4	7.5	14.4	6.2	2.9	3.9	6.5	16.6	1.3	8.6
Hovedbiblioteket	27.8	10.1	5.2	17.1	4.4	3.0	1.4	7.0	11.5	1.8	10.6
Egegård	23.9	9.3	5.9	15.2	4.6	3.4	1.9	10.7	12.3	2.9	9.8
Grønnemose	27.4	12.0	4.1	16.0	2.9	4.0	0.9	6.2	7.8	1.9	16.8
Mørkhøj	26.6	8.9	4.3	15.9	4.5	3.3	1.3	9.1	10.1	2.5	13.5
Stengård	24.0	13.6	6.8	17.2	5.5	3.1	1.8	4.3	13.6	1.4	8.9
Søborg (Gladsaxe Idrætscenter)	23.6	12.4	6.1	18.2	4.5	3.2	1.2	5.4	12.2	1.7	11.4
Vadgård	27.1	9.0	6.7	16.7	4.7	2.6	1.4	7.9	12.5	2.4	9.1
Værebro	19.9	10.2	6.9	13.8	5.0	2.6	1.3	6.2	16.3	1.9	15.8

== Results ==
Party		Votes	%	+/-	Seats	+/-
Gladsaxe Municipality
A	Social Democrats	8,524	24.93	-8.02	7	-1
F	Green Left	5,534	16.18	+4.80	4	+1
V	Venstre	4,164	12.18	-1.00	3	-1
Ø	Red-Green Alliance	3,944	11.53	+0.92	3	0
B	Social Liberals	3,718	10.87	+3.22	3	+1
O	Danish People's Party	2,396	7.01	+3.59	2	+1
C	Conservatives	1,988	5.81	-5.85	1	-2
I	Liberal Alliance	1,588	4.64	+3.11	1	+1
L	Lokallisten Gladsaxe	1,096	3.20	-0.67	1	0
Æ	Denmark Democrats	668	1.95	New	0	New
M	Moderates	578	1.69	New	0	New
Total		34,198	100	N/A	25	N/A
Invalid votes		155	0.29	-0.02		
Blank votes		477	0.89	+0.09		
Turnout		34,830	65.06	+2.64		
Source: valg.dk

== Opinion polls ==
Polling firm	Fieldwork date	Sample size	A	V	C	F	Ø	B	L	O	I	M	Æ	Others	Lead
Epinion	4 Sep - 13 Oct 2025	542	29.4	5.8	6.3	19.4	13.0	4.9	–	10.6	6.6	1.1	1.7	1.2	10.0
2024 european parliament election	9 Jun 2024		16.7	9.6	8.4	22.3	9.5	10.3	–	5.5	6.2	6.0	2.5	–	5.6
2022 general election	1 Nov 2022		27.7	9.5	4.8	11.6	6.9	6.4	–	3.2	7.3	10.9	3.1	–	16.1
2021 regional election	16 Nov 2021		29.5	10.8	15.1	11.1	10.6	10.1	–	3.6	1.9	–	–	–	14.4
2021 municipal election	16 Nov 2021		32.9 (8)	13.2 (4)	11.7 (3)	11.4 (3)	10.6 (3)	7.7 (2)	3.9 (1)	3.4 (1)	1.5 (0)	–	–	–	19.7
