= Carl Andersen =

Carl Andersen may refer to:

- Carl Andersen (gymnast) (1879–1967), Danish architect who competed as a gymnast in the 1906 and 1908 Olympics
- Carl Rudolf Andersen (1899–1983), Danish gymnast who competed in the 1920 Olympics
- Carl Albert Andersen (1876–1951), Norwegian pole vaulter, high jumper, and gymnast
- Carl Thorvald Andersen (1835–1916), Danish architect
- Carl-Ebbe Andersen (1929–2009), Danish rower
- H. Carl Andersen (1897–1978), U.S. representative from Minnesota
- Carl Andersen (politician) (born 1995), Danish politician
- Joachim Andersen (composer) (Carl Joachim Andersen, 1847–1909), Danish flutist, conductor and composer

== See also ==
- Carl Anderson (disambiguation)
- Karl Anderson (disambiguation)
