= Carl Andersen (politician) =

Danish politician

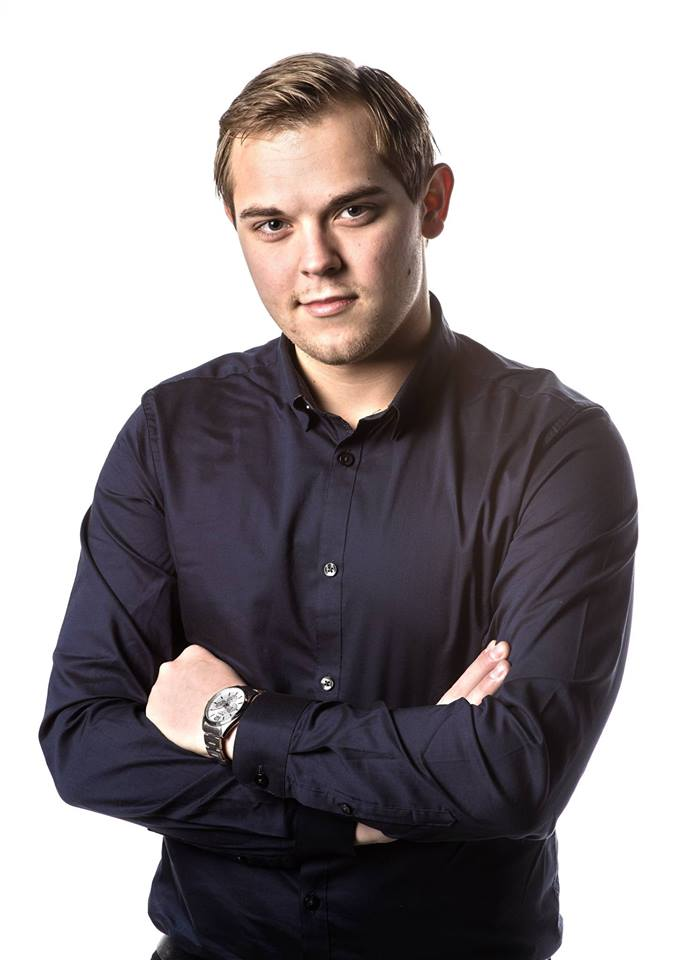

Member of the Folketing
- Incumbent
- Assumed office 16 July 2024
- Preceded by: Henrik Dahl
- Constituency: South Jutland

Chairman of Liberal Alliance's Youth
- In office 13 March 2018 – 23 February 2019
- Preceded by: Soren Nielsen
- Succeeded by: Signe Bøgevald Hansen

Deputy Chairman of the Liberal Alliance's Youth
- In office 29 February 2017 – 13 March 2018
- Preceded by: Amanda M. Madsen
- Succeeded by: Andreas Rohde

City Council Member of Vejen Municipality
- In office 1 January 2014 – 30 July 2016

Personal details
- Born: 27 January 1995 (age 30); South Jutland
- Political party: Liberal Alliance
- Education: University of Copenhagen

Carl Andersen (born 27 January 1995) is a Danish politician who has been a member of the People's Parliament for the Liberal Alliance in the South Jutland since July 2024. He took office on 16 July 2024 as a deputy for Henrik Dahl who had been elected to the European Parliament at the 2024 European Parliament election in Denmark.

Carl Andersen was chairman of the Liberal Alliances Ungdom 2018–19, where he was ousted after accusations of not having handled the investigation of allegations of sexual abuse in the youth party satisfactorily. In addition, he is city council member for the party in Vejen Municipality and since 2018 member of the Liberal Alliance's Main Board.

== Early life ==
Carl Andersen grew up on a farm near Rødding in Vejen Municipality. In 2016, he started studying for agricultural economist. Since 1 May 2019, he has been employed by Dansk Erhverv, first as a student and now as a political consultant for family-owned companies.

== Political career ==
Andersen has been an active member of Liberal Alliance and Liberal Alliances Ungdom since 2009.

=== City Council Member ===
Andersen won with 300 personal votes elected for the Liberal Alliance to the city council in Vejen Kommune as an 18-year-old high school student in 2013. It was the first time the Liberal Alliance was represented in the city council. He resigned from the city council again before the end of the election period in June 2016, when he moved to Albertslund in connection with his studies . From May 2020 he lives in Herlev.

At the Municipal election in Herlev Municipality 2021 Andersen was the party's lead candidate in Herlev Municipality.

=== Chairman of Liberal Alliances Ungdom ===
Andersen was chairman of the Liberal Alliance's Youth Political Committee in 2015 and 2016 and national deputy chairman 2017–18. In 2018, he became national chairman of Liberal Alliances Ungdom after a closely fought election, where he got 107 votes against the sitting chairman's 105 votes.

The following year, he himself was overthrown in a new contested election, after former chairman of LAU Ramus Brygger, immediately before the national meeting, published a series of accusations of rape, assault and offensive comments against a total of seven girls and women in the Liberal Alliance's Ungdom committed of several male members, some of whom held leading positions in the youth party. Brygger called on both Carl Andersen and the rest of the management to resign for failing to clear up the case. Carl Andersen subsequently obtained in the presidential election at the national meeting 78 votes against 101 votes for the challenger Signe Bøgevald Hansen. Subsequently, it became known that Carl Andersen and the other management had had greater knowledge of the cases than Andersen had initially mentioned.

=== Liberal Alliance main board ===
At the Liberal Alliance's National Meeting in March 2019, Carl Andersen was elected to the party's main board with the second most personal votes. 2021-2022 he was a member of the party's executive committee.

=== Folketing ===
In 2022, Andersen ran for the general election in the South Jutland Storkreds, where he became 1st deputy with 821 votes. When Henrik Dahl was elected to the European Parliament at the 2024 European Parliament election in Denmark and therefore resigned from the Folketing, Andersen took over on 16 July 2024 Dahl's mandate as a deputy.
