= Rindalism =

Opposition to abstract art

In Denmark, rindalism (Danish: rindalisme) refers to opposition to abstract art and especially public funding thereof. Named after Peter Rindal, the term covered the mid-1960s movement in Denmark against the establishment of Statens Kunstfond.

== Background ==
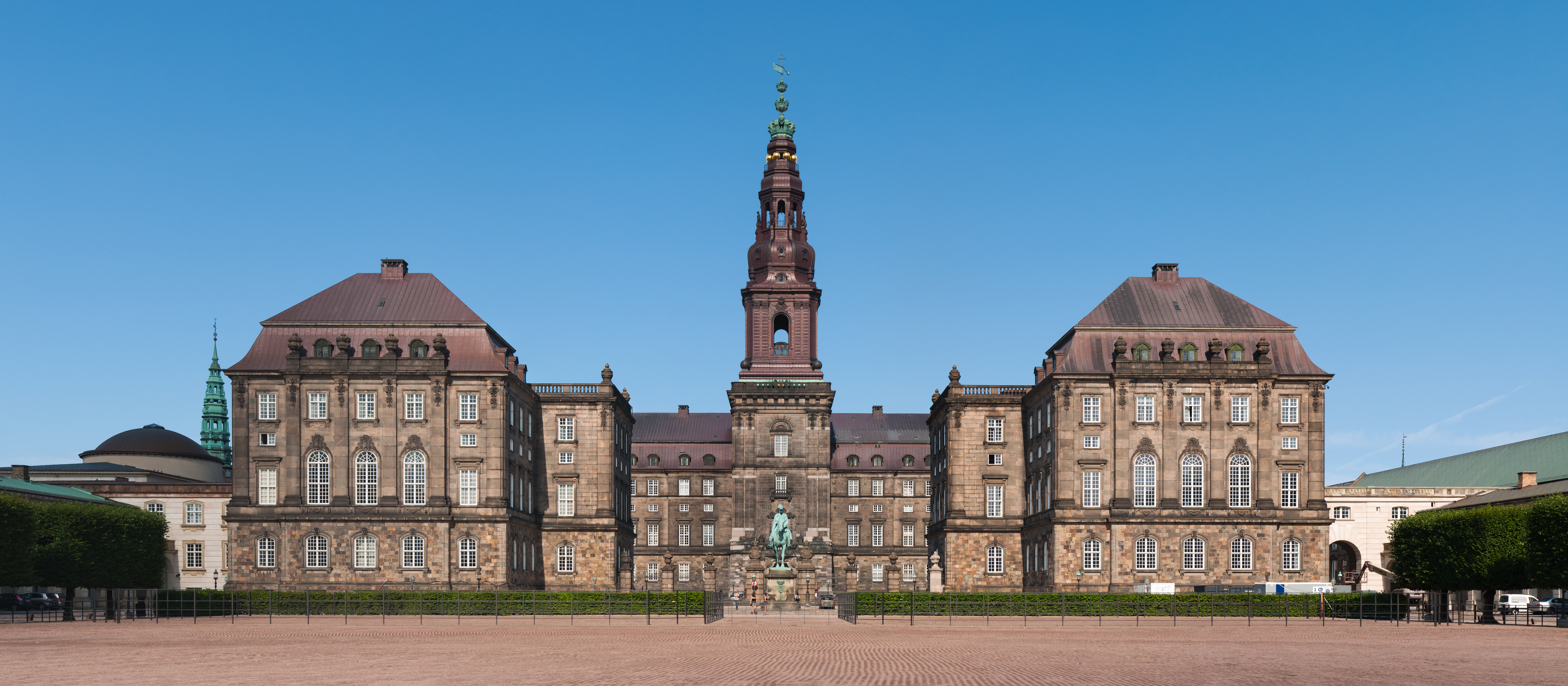
Christiansborg Palace, the home of the Danish Parliament where the subsidisation bill was passed in 1964

On 27 May 1964, the parties in the Danish Parliament, except for De Uafhængige, voted for the law on Statens Kunstfond. The law introduced a new administrative body, Statens Kunstfond, as well as a reprioritisation and massive expansion of art support, so that it reached 3.5 million kr.

On 29 January 1965, the first young artists received the first three-year scholarships. Within literature, these were Klaus Rifbjerg, Thorkild Hansen, Sven Holm, Knud Holst, Ulla Ryum and Jess Ørnsbo. The tax-financed state support for Rifbjerg in particular caused outrage, as he lived life with expensive cars and trips. However, the subsidies awarded to Peter Bonnén from Statens Kunstfond also caused outrage. Ordnet.dk, a website by the Danish Language and Literature Society, defines rindalism as "opposition to or distancing from public financial support for artists and art purchases".

During a press conference against the new arts subsidies law, which apparently got behind both Progress Party politicians, artists and cultural mediators, Peter Rindal and his supporters quickly managed to collect around 60,000 protest signatures. However, the protests did not have much significance for the Statens Kunstfond or its administration, whose budget quickly grew from 3,5 million kr. in 1965 to 41,8 million kr. in 1993 and 73,1 million kr. in 2005. According to Dagbladet Information in 2009, the term rindalism was first used by the tabloid newspaper Ekstra Bladet.

In 2022, member of the Danish Parliament Henrik Dahl (LA) described himself as an rindalist. In 2023, Alex Ahrendtsen (DF), also MF, published a book about rindalism titled Rindal: Kampen mod kultureliten og velfærdsstaten (Rindal: The struggle against the cultural elite and the welfare state), in which context Dahl called for the revival of rindalism.
