= Listed buildings in Gladsaxe Municipality =

This is a list of listed buildings in Gladsaxe Municipality, Denmark.

== The list ==
Listing name	Image	Location	Coordinates	Description
Højdebeholderanlægget på Tinghøj		Vandtårnsvej 60, 2860 Søborg	55°44′12.37″N 12°29′49.24″E	
Højdebeholderanlægget på Tinghøj		Vandtårnsvej 60, 2860 Søborg	55°44′12.37″N 12°29′49.24″E	
Højdebeholderanlægget på Tinghøj		Vandtårnsvej 60, 2860 Søborg	55°44′12.37″N 12°29′49.24″E	
Højdebeholderanlægget på Tinghøj		Vandtårnsvej 60, 2860 Søborg	55°44′12.37″N 12°29′49.24″E	
Mørkhøjgård		Mørkhøj Bygade 19, 2860 Søborg	55°43′55.74″N 12°28′42.56″E	
