= Gitte Seeberg =

Danish politician

Gitte Seeberg (born 25 June 1960 in Copenhagen) is a Danish politician, lawyer, and current secretary general of the Danish branch of the WWF. She was a member of the Danish Folketinget parliament for the Conservative People's Party and New Alliance, and has previously been a Member of the European Parliament.

== Biography ==
Seeberg earned a Degree in law from Copenhagen University in 1986. She then worked as a commercial property agent and ran an independent legal practice.

In 1994, Seeberg was elected to represent the Conservative People's Party in the Danish Folketinget parliament. The trio of her, Lene Espersen, Henriette Kjær were seen as a breath of fresh air to the Conservatives, while political rivals nicknamed them "April, May, and June", after Daisy Duck's nieces in Disney comics. She held a number of speaker positions for the Conservatives, among them financial, foreign, and EU policy, and was vice-chairman of the parliamentary party group from 2001 to 2004.

In the 2004 European Parliament election, Seeberg was elected to represent the Conservative People's Party in the European Parliament. She was a Member of the Bureau of the European People's Party.

She left the Conservative People's Party on 7 May 2007, to be a co-founder of the party New Alliance, alongside Naser Khader and Anders Samuelsen. She returned to the Folketinget following the 2007 Danish parliamentary election in November 2007, as she helped New Alliance gain five parliamentary seats. On 29 January 2008 she left the party in protest against the party's status as a right-wing party, which conflicted with her own original desire to form a centrist party rejecting the influence of the Danish People's Party.

In July 2008, she announced that she would leave parliament as of September 2008 to become secretary general of the WWF.
