= Young Alliance =

Young Alliance may refer to:

- Young Alliance (Northern Ireland), the youth wing of the Alliance Party of Northern Ireland
- Young Alliance (Denmark), the youth wing of the New Alliance in Denmark.
