= Nancy Eriksson =

Swedish politician (1907–1984)

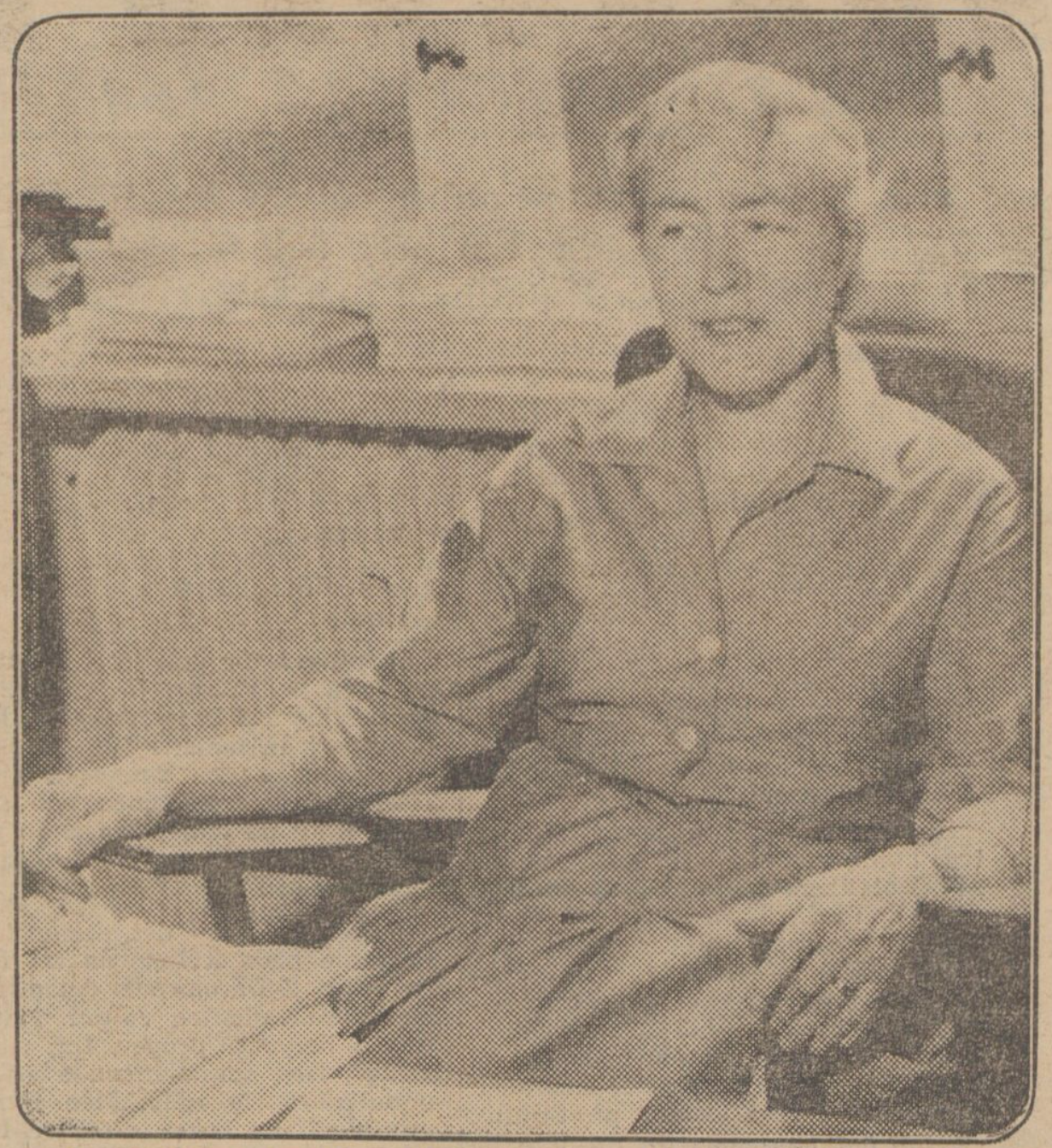
- Nancy Eriksson in 1964
- Born: Nancy Margareta Eriksson; 11 April 1907; Gladsaxe, Denmark
- Died: 12 May 1984 (aged 77); Stockholm, Sweden
- Occupation: Politician
- Relatives: Birgitta Bergmark (daughter)

Nancy Margareta Eriksson (11 April 1907 – 12 May 1984) was a Swedish politician for the Swedish Social Democratic Party and a member of the Swedish Riksdag. She also made a notable appearance in the SVT television series Här är ditt liv in 1981.

== Early life ==
Eriksson was born on 11 April 1907 in Gladsaxe, Denmark. She was adopted by a Swedish family after her birth mother put her up for adoption by placing an advert in the newspaper Skånska Dagbladet.

== Career ==
Eriksson graduated in 1927 and in 1932, she started working as a nurse. Eriksson was elected to the Riksdag, the Swedish national legislative assembly, in 1948 and became a member of the second chamber from 1949. She remained a member of parliament between 1949 and 1970.

Eriksson was very active in the Swedish Social Democratic campaign against the Swedish nuclear weapons programme, and at the forefront in proposing a motion against atomic weapons. The motion was accepted at the congress of democratic parties held in November 1956. As a leader of the Diabetic Society for twenty years (1956–1978), she wrote motions so that diabetics could get jobs with the state, despite earlier restrictions. During her time in the Riksdag, she was successful in 1981 in legislating free bus travel for passengers travelling with baby carriages.

Eriksson had a noted appearance on the television show Här är ditt liv (a Swedish version of This Is Your Life) broadcast on 31 January 1981, on SVT. She was that week's celebrity guest, "kidnapped" at the hands of Lasse Holmqvist.

She was awarded the Illis quorum in 1978.

== Bibliography ==
- Bara en hemmafru debattskrift 1964
- Nancy – Nancy Eriksson minns, 1985, ISBN 91-0-046715-4
