= Anders Samuelsen =

Danish former politician (born 1967)

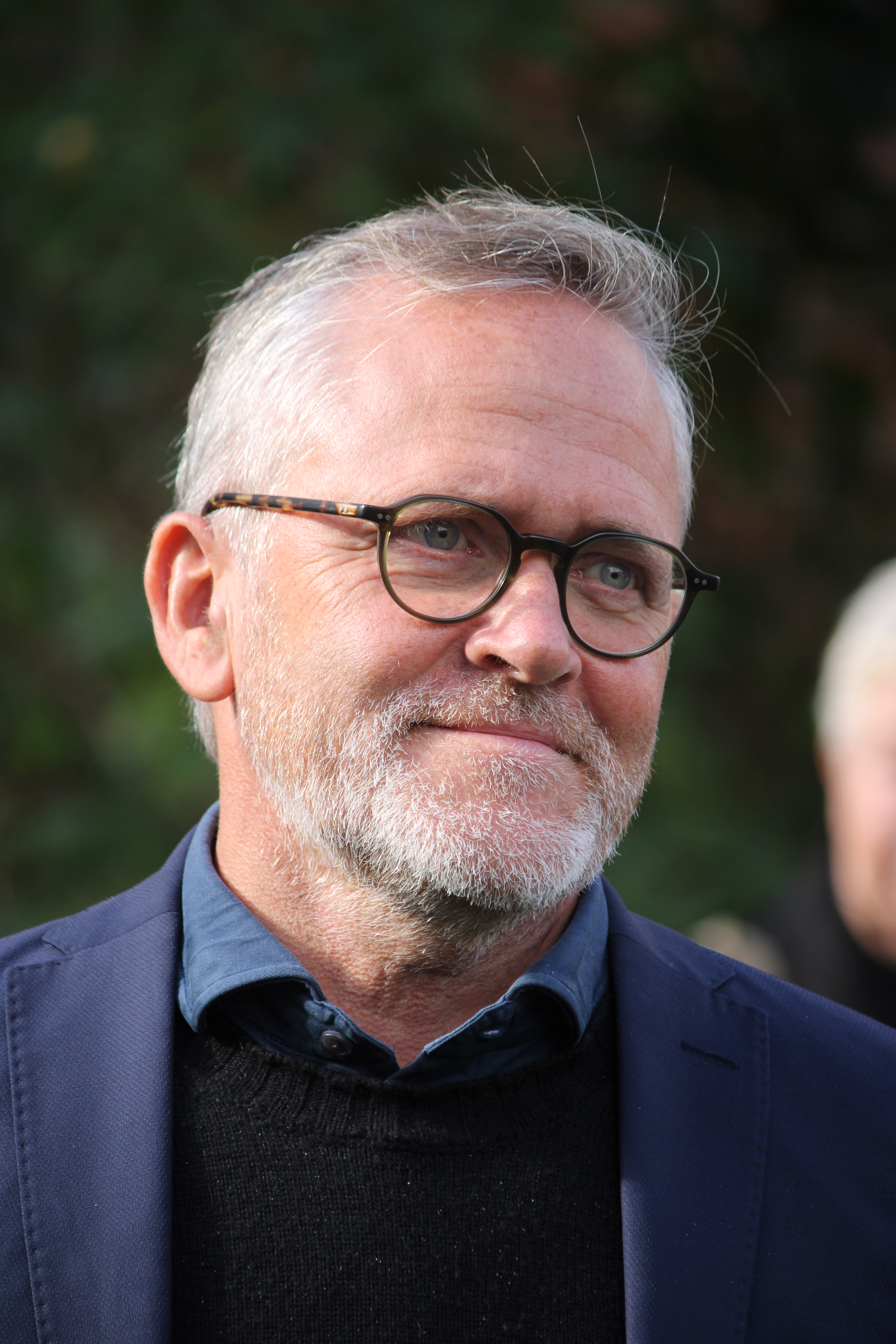
- Samuelsen in 2025

Minister of Foreign Affairs
- In office 28 November 2016 – 27 June 2019
- Prime Minister: Lars Løkke Rasmussen
- Preceded by: Kristian Jensen
- Succeeded by: Jeppe Kofod

Leader of Liberal Alliance
- In office 5 January 2009 – 6 June 2019
- Preceded by: Naser Khader
- Succeeded by: Alex Vanopslagh

President of the Committee of Ministers of the Council of Europe
- In office 15 November 2017 – 18 May 2018
- Preceded by: Lubomír Zaorálek
- Succeeded by: Marija Pejčinović Burić

Personal details
- Born: 1 August 1967 (age 59) Horsens, Denmark
- Party: Liberal Alliance
- Other political affiliations: Danish Social Liberal Party (until 2007)
- Education: Aarhus University

Anders Samuelsen (born 1 August 1967) is a Danish former politician who served as minister of foreign affairs from 2016 to 2019 and as leader of the Liberal Alliance from 2009 to 2019. He was a member of the Folketing for the Danish Social Liberal Party from 1998 to 2004 and for Liberal Alliance from 2007 to 2019, and represented Denmark in the European Parliament from 2004 to 2007.

A graduate in political science from Aarhus University, Samuelsen worked in the disability sector before embarking on a national political career with the Danish Social Liberal Party in the late 1990s. He later became one of the three founders and the main strategist of Ny Alliance, which was relaunched as Liberal Alliance in 2008, and played a prominent role in centre-right politics in the 2010s, particularly on tax and economic policy. As foreign minister in Lars Løkke Rasmussen's third cabinet he oversaw Danish contributions to the international coalition against the Islamic State in Syria and to the Resolute Support Mission in Afghanistan, and chaired the Committee of Ministers of the Council of Europe in 2017–18.

After Liberal Alliance's heavy defeat at the 2019 Danish general election, in which he lost his parliamentary seat, Samuelsen resigned as party leader amid internal criticism of his leadership. He has since worked in the private sector, including executive roles in UV-technology companies based in Aarhus and in the UVH group.

== Early life and education ==
Samuelsen was born in Horsens and is the son of former Folketing member Ole Samuelsen and household economics teacher Anna Holm. He studied political science at Aarhus University, graduating with a cand.scient.pol. (Master of Political Science) degree in 1993.

From 1994 to 1998 he worked as a consultant and project coordinator at Castberggård Døves Højskole, a folk high school and training centre for deaf people near Hedensted. He is the brother of Mette Bock, a former culture minister and fellow Liberal Alliance politician.

== Political career ==
=== Danish Social Liberal Party ===
Samuelsen began his political career in the Danish Social Liberal Party (Radikale Venstre). He was the party's parliamentary candidate in the Horsens constituency from 1994 to 1998 and in the Holbæk constituency from 1998 to 2004. He initially sat in the Folketing as a temporary substitute member in 1997–2001, before being elected in his own right for Vestsjællands Amtskreds at the 2001 Danish general election. During his time in the Social Liberal group he served as spokesperson on, among other areas, labour market, tax and local government policy.

=== Member of the European Parliament ===
At the 2004 European Parliament election Samuelsen was elected to the European Parliament for the Danish Social Liberal Party, sitting with the ALDE Group. From 2004 to 2007 he was a member of the Parliament's Committee on Budgets. As an MEP he also served as a substitute member of the Committee on Foreign Affairs, a member of the Delegation for relations with Iran and a substitute for the Delegation for relations with the People's Republic of China. He left the Folketing in 2004 in connection with his move to the European Parliament.

=== Liberal Alliance and national politics ===
In May 2007 Samuelsen left the Danish Social Liberal Party and, together with Naser Khader and Gitte Seeberg, founded Ny Alliance, a new centrist party that later changed its name to Liberal Alliance. He was elected to the Folketing for Ny Alliance at the 2007 Danish general election, representing the East Jutland constituency, and continued as a Liberal Alliance MP from 2008 until 2019.

After Khader left the party in January 2009, Samuelsen was chosen as political leader of Liberal Alliance. Under his leadership the party developed a more explicitly economically liberal profile, emphasising lower taxation, deregulation and a smaller public sector.

At the 2009 Danish local elections he was elected to Horsens Municipal Council as Liberal Alliance's sole councillor, serving a single term from 2010 to 2013. In the national parliament he represented the East Jutland constituency until 2011 and the North Zealand constituency from 2011 to 2019.

By late 2016 Samuelsen and Liberal Alliance, then a support party for Lars Løkke Rasmussen's minority government, threatened to withdraw their support over the lack of progress on cutting the top rate of income tax, as well as disagreements on immigration and welfare policy. In September 2016 he announced that the party was prepared to table a motion of no confidence if the government did not reduce the top marginal income tax rate by five percentage points in the 2017 budget. The standoff ended in November 2016, when Rasmussen reshuffled his cabinet, bringing Liberal Alliance and the Conservative People's Party into government in a new three-party coalition in which Liberal Alliance took charge of six ministries.

=== Minister of Foreign Affairs ===
Samuelsen was appointed minister of foreign affairs on 28 November 2016, serving in that post until the government left office on 27 June 2019. As foreign minister he represented Denmark in the European Union, NATO, the United Nations and other international fora, and oversaw a number of Danish military contributions abroad.

In January 2017 the government obtained parliamentary approval to deploy up to 60 special forces to Syria as part of the U.S.-led coalition against the Islamic State. Later that year the government decided to send an additional 55 soldiers to the Resolute Support Mission in Afghanistan following an attack on a Danish convoy in Kabul.

From November 2017 to May 2018 Samuelsen served as president of the Committee of Ministers of the Council of Europe, as Denmark held the rotating chairmanship of the Committee of Ministers. During the Danish chairmanship the government prioritised, among other issues, reform of the Council of Europe's human rights system and strengthening the organisation's financial sustainability.

=== 2019 election and resignation ===
At the 2019 Danish general election Liberal Alliance's vote share fell sharply and the party was reduced from thirteen to four seats; Samuelsen himself failed to win re-election. In the aftermath of the election he faced public criticism from within the party, including from MP Henrik Dahl, who accused his leadership of being characterised by nepotism.

On 6 June 2019 Samuelsen announced that he was stepping down as party leader, stating that Liberal Alliance should continue under new leadership following the election defeat. He was succeeded by Alex Vanopslagh.

== Later career ==
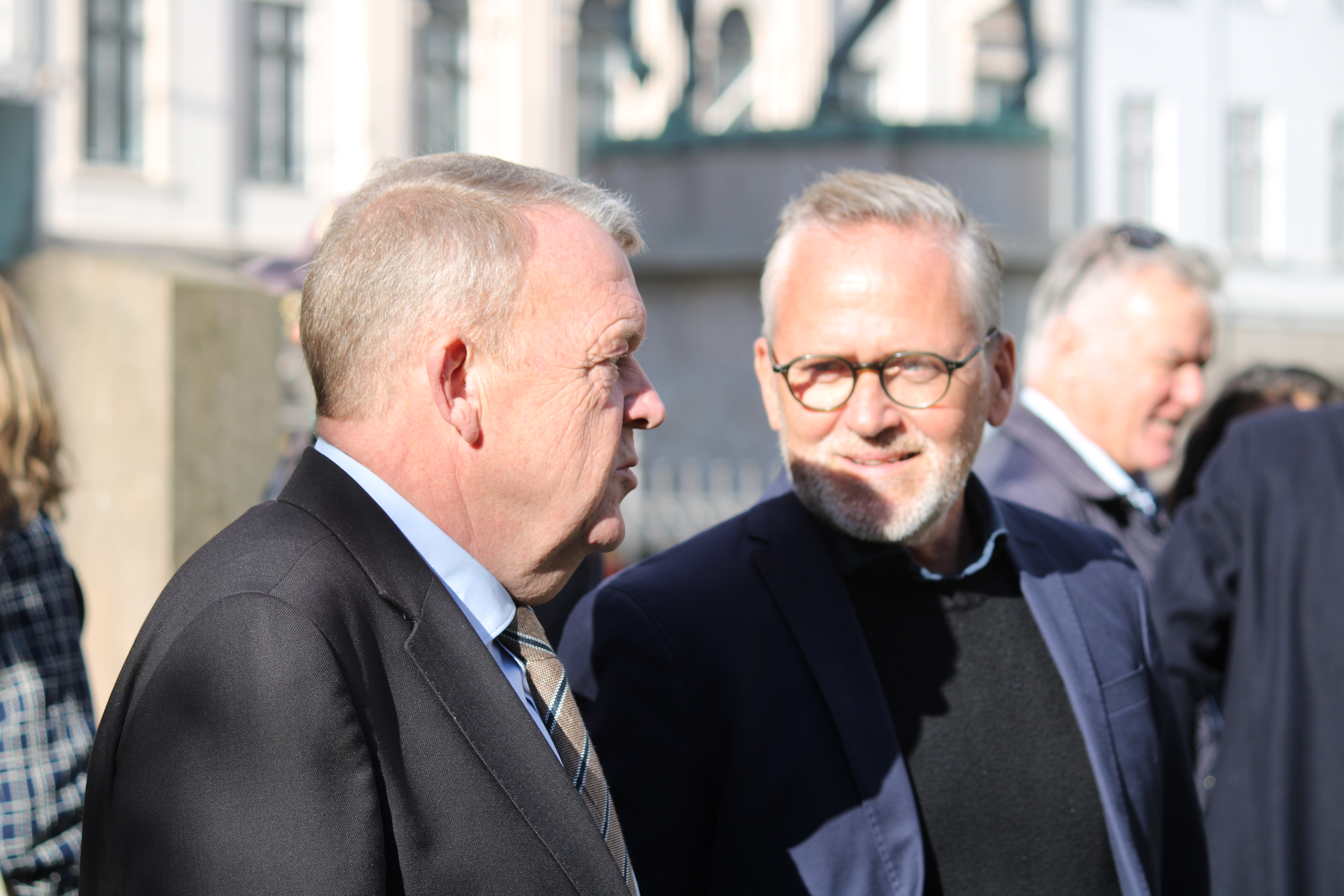
With former government partner Lars Løkke Rasmussen in October 2025

After leaving national politics Samuelsen moved into the private sector. He has held senior roles in companies working with ultraviolet-based disinfection and lighting technology, including as executive vice president of UV Medico Europe and chief executive of the UVH holding company, which owns UV Medico and UV Laser.

== Personal life ==
Samuelsen has two sons. He has spoken about the influence of his father, Ole Samuelsen, on his political views and has described him as an important role model. He is an enthusiastic runner and has highlighted areas around Horsens and on the island of Samsø as among his favourite places in Denmark.

== Other activities and honours ==
- Asian Infrastructure Investment Bank (AIIB), ex officio member of the Board of Governors while serving as foreign minister.
- Grand Cross of the Order of the Crown (Belgium), 2017.
- Knight of the Order of the Dannebrog, 2012.

== See also ==
- List of foreign ministers in 2017
- List of current foreign ministers

Political offices
Preceded by Kristian Jensen	Minister for Foreign Affairs; 2016–2019	Succeeded by Jeppe Kofod
Preceded by Naser Khader	Leader of the Liberal Alliance; 2009–2019	Succeeded by Alex Vanopslagh
