= Carl Anderson =

Carl Anderson may refer to:

== Arts and entertainment ==
- Carl Thomas Anderson (1865–1948), American cartoonist
- Carl Anderson (art director) (1903–1989), American art director
- Carl Anderson (singer) (1945–2004), American singer, film and theatre actor

== Politics and law ==
- Carl C. Anderson (1877–1912), American politician, U.S. representative from Ohio
- Carl Anderson (North Dakota politician) (1897–1945), American politician, North Dakota State Treasurer
- Carl Anderson (South Carolina politician) (born 1961), American politician, member of the South Carolina House of Representatives

== Sports ==
- Carl Anderson (American football) (1898–1978), American college football coach
- Carl Anderson (basketball) (1913–2001), American professional basketball player
- Carl Anderson (cricketer) (born 1977), New Zealand cricketer

== Others ==
- Carl David Anderson (1905–1991), American physicist, Nobel laureate
- Carl A. Anderson (born 1951), American Supreme Knight of the Knights of Columbus
- Carl Anderson (Toronto official), Canadian educator and politician, candidate in 1974 Toronto municipal election

== See also ==
- Carl Andersen (disambiguation)
- Karl Anderson (disambiguation)
