= Alex Vanopslagh =

French born-Danish politician

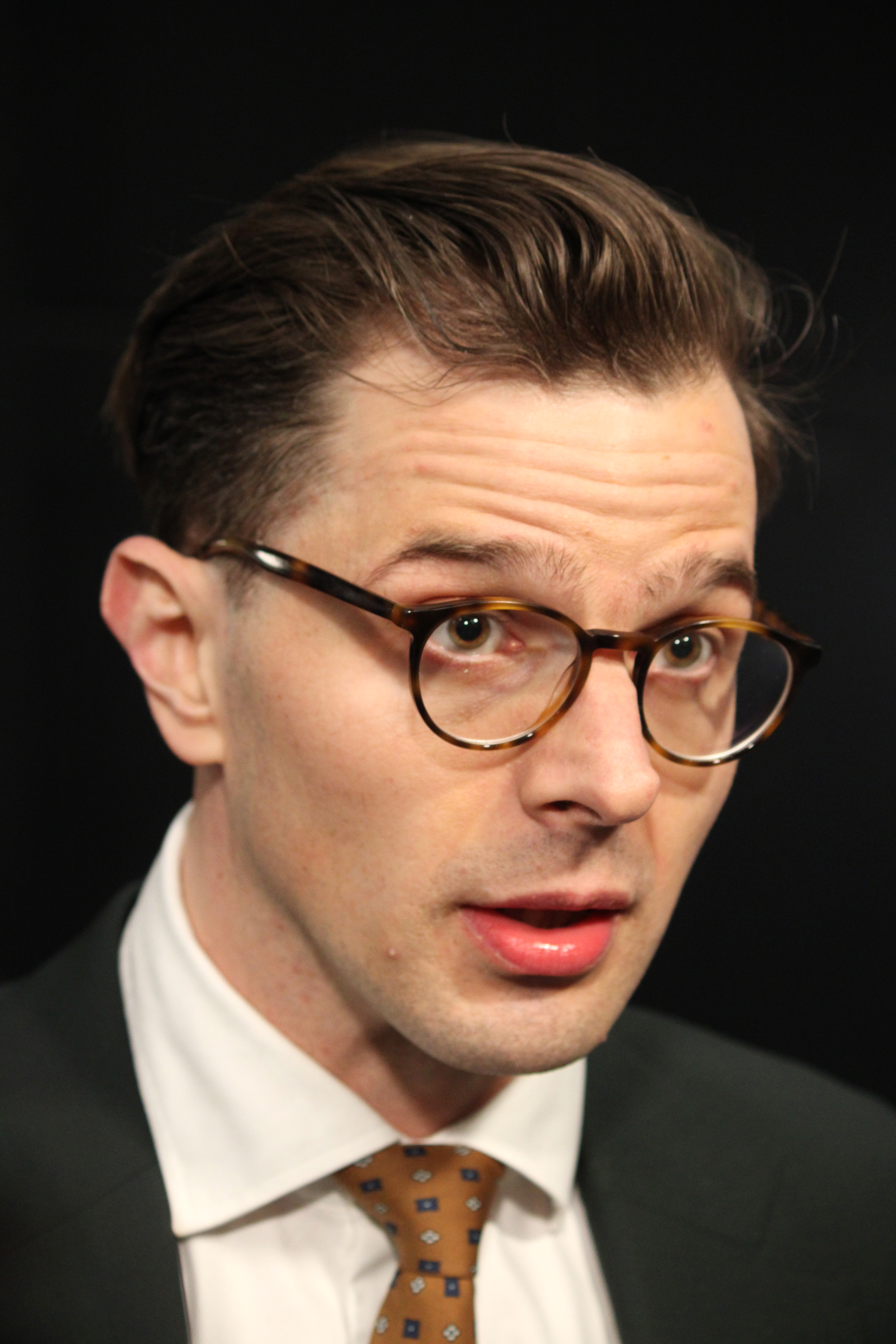
- Vanopslagh in 2026

Leader of the Liberal Alliance
- Incumbent
- Assumed office 9 June 2019
- Preceded by: Anders Samuelsen

Leader of the Liberal Alliance Youth
- In office 8 March 2014 – 12 March 2016
- Preceded by: Rasmus Brygger
- Succeeded by: Stefan Roy Frederiksen

Member of the Folketing
- Incumbent
- Assumed office 5 June 2019
- Constituency: East Jutland

Personal details
- Born: Alex Dominique Kristensen Vanopslagh; 17 October 1991 (age 34) Épernay, France
- Citizenship: Denmark; France
- Party: Liberal Alliance
- Children: 2
- Education: University of Copenhagen

Alex Dominique Kristensen Vanopslagh (born 17 October 1991) is a French-born Danish politician. He is a member of the Folketing, and party leader of the Liberal Alliance. He is a former chairman of its youth wing, the Liberal Alliance Youth.

== Early life and education ==
Alex Vanopslagh, who was born in Épernay, France, moved to Denmark when he was five, and grew up in Struer. His father is French and mother Danish. In 2009 he moved to Herning and completed high school in 2011. He originally wanted to be a journalist, but applied and failed the entrance exam to the Danish Media and Journalism School in Aarhus after taking the wrong bus. He earned a bachelor's degree in political science from the University of Southern Denmark in Odense, and a master's degree from the University of Copenhagen in 2016. He won the Danish Debating Championship in 2016.

== Political career ==
In 2014, he was elected leader of Liberal Alliance Youth, succeeding Rasmus Brygger. He was reelected in 2015 and did not stand for reelection in 2016.

In autumn 2016, he was selected as lead candidate for the Liberal Alliance in the 2017 Copenhagen Municipality elections, and won a seat in the Copenhagen Municipal Council with 3,563 votes.

In the 2019 general election, Vanopslagh was elected to the Folketing representing West Jutland constituency. The election was catastrophic for the Liberal Alliance, which lost nine of thirteen seats and its leader Anders Samuelsen failing to be reelected. Following the defeat, Samuelsen resigned as leader of the party, and was succeeded by Vanopslagh. After Vanopslagh's election as leader, it emerged that he had been involved in football violence as a youth, resulting in him being banned from FC Midtjylland's stadium and receiving a fine from police from a public order offence.

Under Vanopslagh, the Liberal Alliance has seen a major rise in popularity, especially during campaigning for the 2022 Danish general election. Much of Vanopslagh's campaigning has occurred on social media, in particular TikTok; he has been referred to as "The King of TikTok". This campaigning is targeted primarily towards young voters, among whom Liberal Alliance is one of the most popular parties. Vanopslagh led the party to their best ever result in the 2022 election, with the party gaining 10 new seats compared to the last election. Vanopslagh himself received 38,284 personal votes in East Jutland.

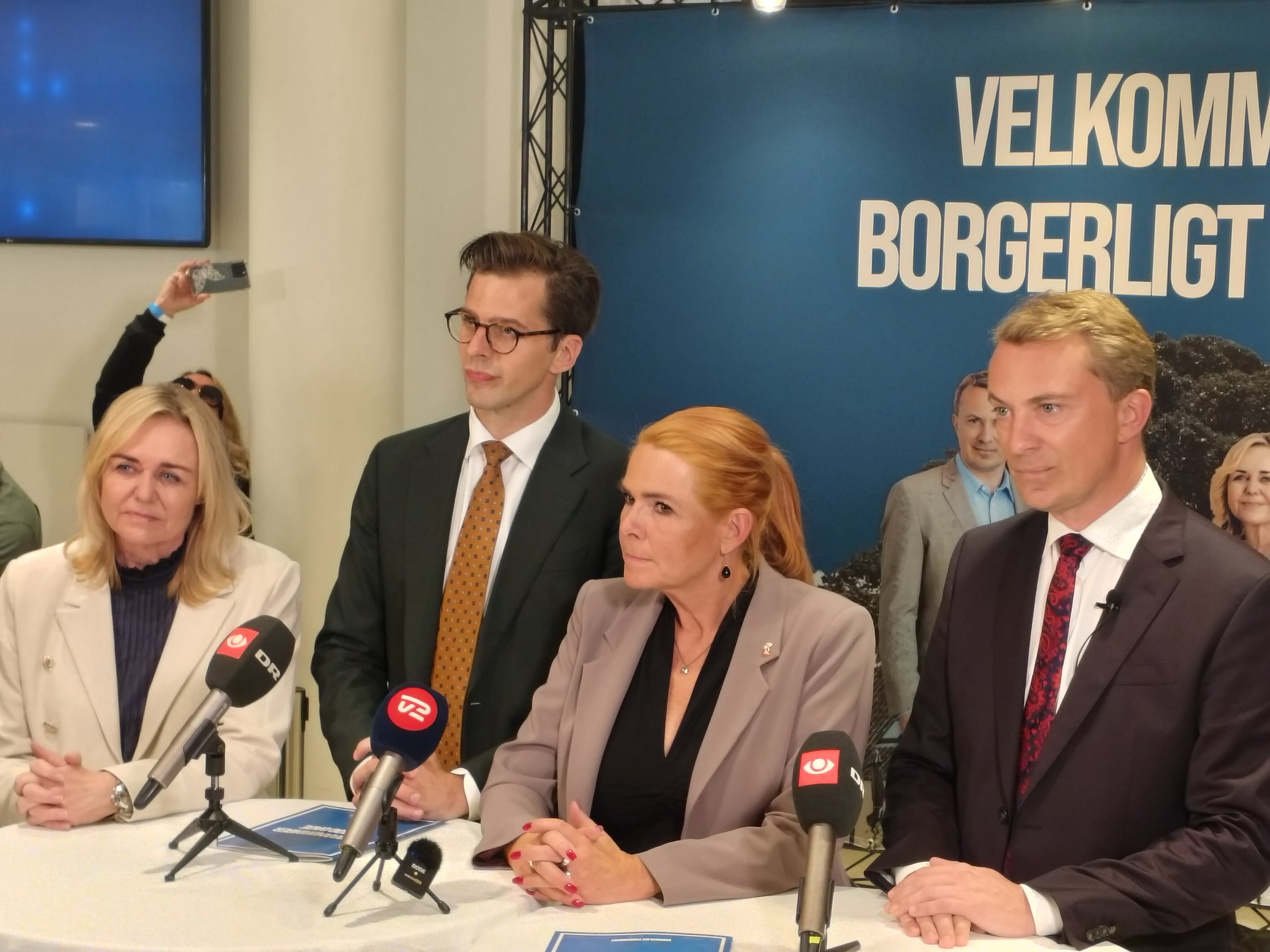
Vanopslagh with Mona Juul, Inger Støjberg and Morten Messerschmidt in Fredericia, 6 September 2025

In March 2026, during the run-up to the 2026 Danish general election, Vanopslagh admitted to having taken cocaine while leader of the Liberal Alliance, commenting that it had only happened twice at most; he denied having purchased cocaine himself. The same month, the party's candidate in Lolland-Falster was removed from the party after publicly criticising Vanosplagh for his statement.

=== Political views ===
Vanopslagh has been a prominent critic of Prime Minister Mette Frederiksen and her government, due to alleged attacks on fundamental institutions, rights and common sense. He has referred to Frederiksen as "the worst news for our democracy and justice state since World War II". During the mink case, Vanopslagh called for Frederiksen to resign and criticized the Social Liberal Party for supposedly letting Frederiksen off the hook.

In 2023, Vanopslagh argued in support of the legalisation of cocaine and the sale of it in pharmacies; he distanced himself from this statement during the 2026 general election and said it was not his party's policy.

Political offices
Preceded by Anders Samuelsen	Leader of the Liberal Alliance; 2019—	Succeeded by Incumbent
