= Allan Steen Kristensen =

Danish chemist and criminal

Allan Steen Kristensen (1958 – 1997) was a Danish person who, as a 19-year-old student, placed nine pipe bombs in and around Copenhagen in 1977–1978. He was nicknamed the 'Bomb Man from Gladsaxe' (Bombemanden fra Gladsaxe) and 'Mystical X' (Det mystiske X).

Of his nine bombs, five detonated. Four people were injured from the blasts, including himself, though no-one was killed. The bomb streak created fear among local residents, which were further bolstered by numerous phone and letter threats.

Kristensen placed his first bomb in Søborg on 4 August 1977. The most spectacular location of one of his bombs was in a sandbox at a school in Gladsaxe on 11 November 1977. The bomb was buried in the sand and connected to a toy, which was discovered by a child. It did not go off because its battery fell out of the assembly.

At a communist rally on 1 May 1978 in Fælledparken, a bomb went off between Kristensen's hands, causing him to lose three fingers on his right hand. He was then arrested. During his trial he claimed that he had no political motives. Doctors described him as intelligent and with no mental issues. On 16 March 1979, Kristensen was sentenced to five years in prison. He was released on probation in September 1981, later graduated as a chemist and got married.

Allan Steen Kristensen died from heart problems in 1997, at the age of 38.
