= Pipe bomb =

Improvised explosive device consisting of explosive material within a sealed pipe

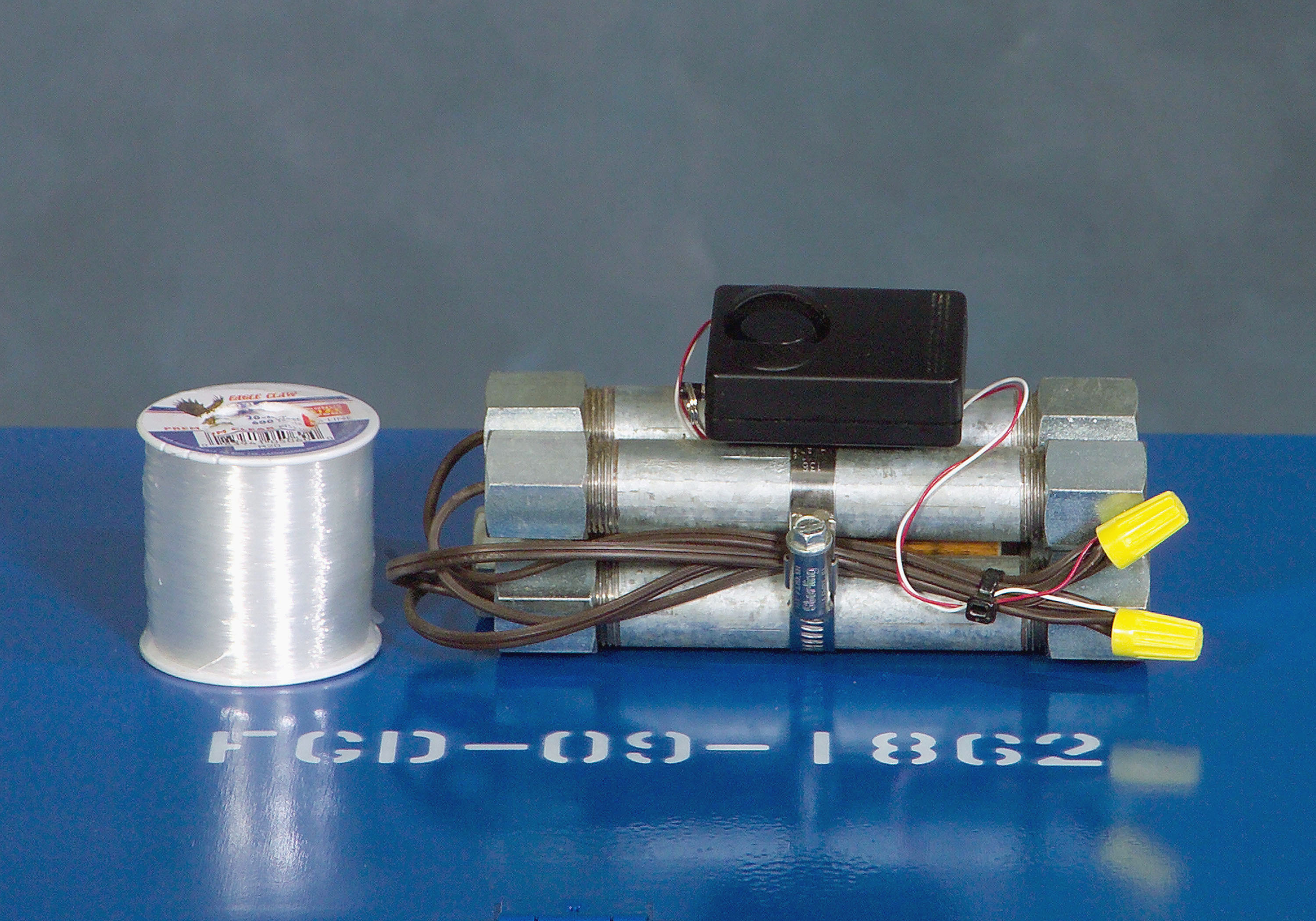
A tripwire-triggered pipe bomb mock-up, used to train U.S. military service personnel.

A pipe bomb is a hand-throwable anti-personnel improvised explosive device (IED), a bomb made from a piece of pipe.

From a technical point of view, a pipe bomb is a mechanically strong containment device, filled with an explosive material, that allows pressure to build until it exceeds the strength of the container at its weakest point; the device is designed to rupture and not to fail at a specific joint, thus resulting in a catastrophic destruction of the container, usually followed by the ejection of sharp shrapnels moving at high speed in all directions.

Pipe bombs have been used primarily by violent non-state actors in guerrilla warfare or in terrorist operations. More rarely, they have been used by the regular armed forces of some countries.

In many countries, the manufacture or possession of a pipe bomb is a serious crime, regardless of its intended use.

== Design ==
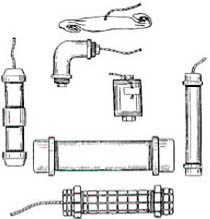
Several examples of pipe bombs. The top one has its ends closed by crimping; the bottom one has intersecting grooves.

The construction characteristics of a pipe bomb – like the characteristics of any improvised explosive device – are determined by the materials, technical knowledge, and inventiveness available to its manufacturer. These factors make it impossible to exhaustively list all the possible variants of this device. However, it is possible to highlight three elements that are specific to all pipe bombs: an explosive charge, a pipe, and an initiator.

Usually the explosive charge consists of a low explosive of low or medium power: smokeless powder obtained from small arms cartridges (pistols or rifles); black powder; flash powder obtained from fireworks; safety match heads; cheddites (i.e. explosives composed primarily of chlorates or perchlorates of potassium, sodium or ammonium); etc. More rarely, the explosive charge can consist of a high explosive, such as dynamite.

The pipe containing the explosive charge is usually a common galvanized metal pipe, such as an iron or steel plumbing pipe. The manufacturer may have made intersecting grooves on the outer surface and/or attached nails, nuts, bolts, ball bearings, etc., to increase the number of shrapnel and fragments projected. A pipe bomb constructed in this way can be roughly compared to a factory-made defensive fragmentation grenade. The pipe can also be made of lightweight sheet metal or plastic (PVC). With this configuration, the pipe bomb can be roughly compared to an offensive blast grenade, which damages the target not through shrapnel but through the local overpressure generated by the explosive charge. In both cases, the pipe is closed at both ends with threaded caps or by crimpings. A small hole is made on the surface of the pipe or on one of the caps, in order to pass the initiator through.

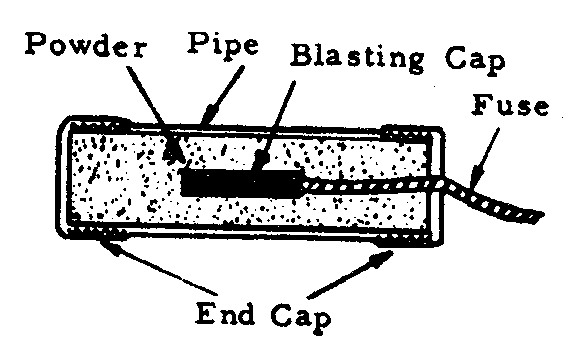
Diagram of a pipe bomb equipped with a fuse connected to a detonator.

The initiator can vary depending on the nature of the explosive charge: if the pipe bomb contains a low explosive such as black powder, the initiator can be a simple fuse; if, instead, it contains a high explosive such as dynamite, etc. then the fuse is connected to a detonator. The initiator can also vary depending on the "mission" that the manufacturer intends the pipe bomb to perform: for example, if he wants to detonate it at a specific time, it is possible that he connects the detonator to an electrical circuit including cables, batteries, timers, switches, etc.

Pipe bomb construction, besides being illegal in most jurisdictions and under most laws around the world, is also a dangerous activity. Many pipe bomb builders have been injured, maimed, or killed by the premature explosion of their own device, due to accidental sparks generated by the explosive substance friction against the threads or uninsulated internal walls of the metal pipe, electrostatic discharges, chemically unstable improvised detonators, etc. These risks can be further increased if the builder adds pieces of metal to the inside of the pipe.

== Operation ==
Pipe bombs concentrate pressure and release it suddenly, through the failure of the outer casing. Plastic materials can be used, but metals typically have a much higher bursting strength and so will produce more concussive force. For example, common schedule 40 1-inch (25 mm) wrought steel pipe has a typical working pressure of 1,010 psi (7.0 MPa), and bursting pressure of 8,090 psi (55.8 MPa), though the pipe sealing method can significantly reduce the burst pressure.

The pipe can rupture in different ways, depending on the rate of pressure rise and the ductility of the casing material.

- If the pressure rise is slow, the metal can deform until the walls become thin and a hole is formed, causing a loud report from the gas release, but no shrapnel.
- A rapid rate of pressure rise will cause the metal to shatter into fragments, which are pushed outward in all directions by the expanding gases.

== Modes of failure ==
Premature detonation is a hazard of attempting to construct any homemade bomb. The materials and methods used with pipe bombs often result in unintentional detonation, usually resulting in serious injury or death to the assembler.

Pipe bombs can fail to explode if the gas pressure buildup is too slow, resulting in bleed-out through the detonator ignition hole. Insufficiently tight threading can also bleed gas pressure through the threads faster than the chemical reaction pressure can rise.

They can also fail if the pipe is fully sealed and the chemical reaction triggered, but the total pressure buildup from the chemicals is insufficient to exceed the casing strength; such a bomb inevitably fails to trigger, but is still potentially dangerous if handled, since an external shock could trigger rupture of the statically pressurized casing.

== Minimum evacuation distances ==
If any type of bomb is suspected, typical recommendations are to keep all people at a minimum evacuation distance until authorized bomb disposal personnel arrive. For a pipe bomb, the U.S. Department of Homeland Security recommends a minimum of 21 m (70 ft), and an outdoors distance of 259 m (850 ft).

== Uses ==
Pipe bombs were adopted and used successfully by some regular armed forces, for example during World War I (1914–1918), the Spanish Civil War (1936–1939) and World War II (1939–1945). During the First World War, among the hand grenades supplied to the Italian infantry, there was a pipe bomb called "hand-held piece" (Italian: spezzone a mano); during the Second World War, training for the Home Guard, the auxiliary force of the British Army, also included the production and use of pipe bombs.

Pipe bombs are by nature improvised weapons and typically used by those without access to military devices such as grenades.

In Northern Ireland, there have been hundreds of pipe bomb attacks since the mid-1990s as the Troubles came to an end. Most of the attacks have been launched by loyalist paramilitaries, especially the Red Hand Defenders, Orange Volunteers and Ulster Defence Association. However, they have also been used by Irish republican paramilitaries and by anti-drugs vigilante group Republican Action Against Drugs. They are also used extensively in the south of Ireland by feuding criminals, including drug dealers, mainly in the capital city of Dublin.

As well as users such as criminals, paramilitaries, and militias, they also have a long tradition of recreational use for amusement or mischief with no intention to cause injury to anyone, but due to the dangers of premature ignition and of shrapnel, pipe bombs are much more dangerous than alternatives, such as dry ice bombs or potato cannons.

=== Notable incidents ===
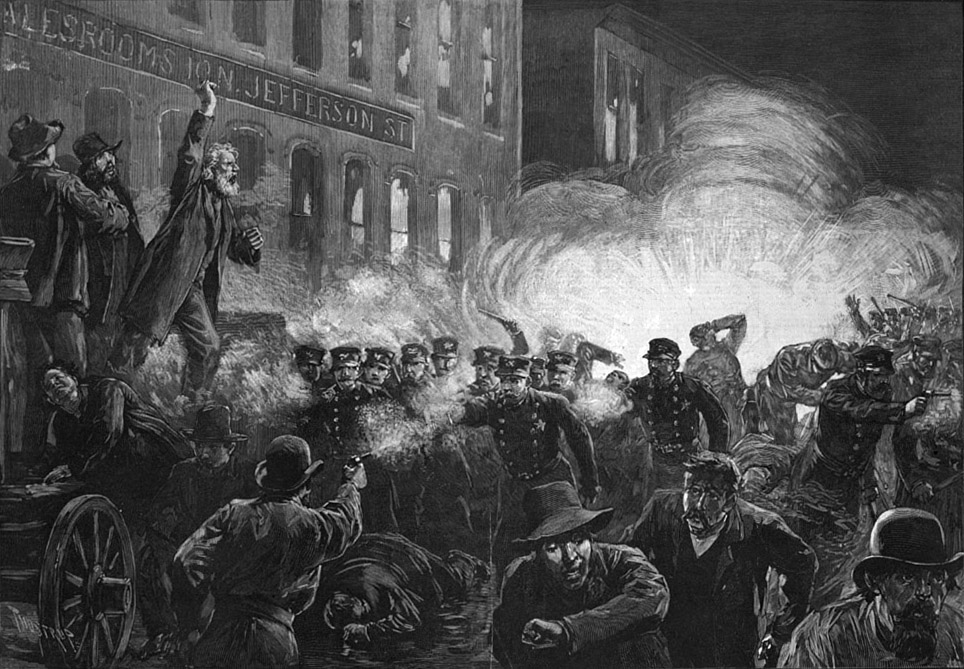
This 1886 engraving was the most widely reproduced image of the Haymarket riots. It inaccurately shows Fielden speaking, the pipe bomb exploding, and the rioting beginning simultaneously.

- On 4 May 1886, a pipe bomb was thrown during a rally at Haymarket Square in Chicago, Illinois, United States. It reached a police line and exploded, killing policeman Mathias J. Degan. The bomb was made from gas-pipe filled with dynamite and capped at both ends with wooden blocks.
- From August 1977 to November 1977 Allan Steen Kristensen planted several bombs across Copenhagen, Denmark injuring 5.
- In 1985, Palestinian American anti-discrimination activist Alex Odeh was killed in California by a pipe-bomb. Activists from the Jewish Defense League are suspected of being the bombers.
- On 16 December 1989, Federal Judge Robert Vance was assassinated in his home in Mountain Brook, Alabama when he opened a package that contained a pipe bomb mailed by Walter Leroy Moody in Mountain Brook, Alabama.
- On 27 July 1996, Eric Rudolph used a pipe bomb in the Centennial Olympic Park bombing during the 1996 Summer Olympics in Atlanta, Georgia, United States. It killed two people and injured 111.
- During the preparation of the Columbine High School massacre, Eric Harris and Dylan Klebold had experimented with pipe bombs. During their testing and experimentation, Eric Harris had posted their results on his website. During the massacre, Harris and Klebold had used their pipe bombs as makeshift hand grenades, alongside various other bombs they had crudely manufactured.
- On 11 December 2010 a suicide bomber detonated one out of six pipe bombs close to a major shopping district in Stockholm, Sweden, killing himself with no other casualties in what is known as the 2010 Stockholm bombings.
- In October 2018, pipe bombs without triggering devices were sent to various liberal and political figures in the United States. Recipients included political activist and investor George Soros, former secretary of state Hillary Clinton, former President Barack Obama, former CIA director John Brennan, and former attorney general Eric Holder.
- On 6 January 2021, a pipe bomb was found at the headquarters of the Republican National Committee, during the certification of President-elect Joe Biden. An unidentified object was also found at the headquarters of the Democratic National Committee, resulting in an evacuation. These findings are likely connected to the riot that day. A suspect was arrested in December 2025.

== See also ==
- Bangalore torpedo
- Bicycle bomb
- Improvised explosive device
- Jam tin grenade
- Nail bomb
- TM 31-210 Improvised Munitions Handbook
