= Mette Bock =

Danish politician, journalist and consultant

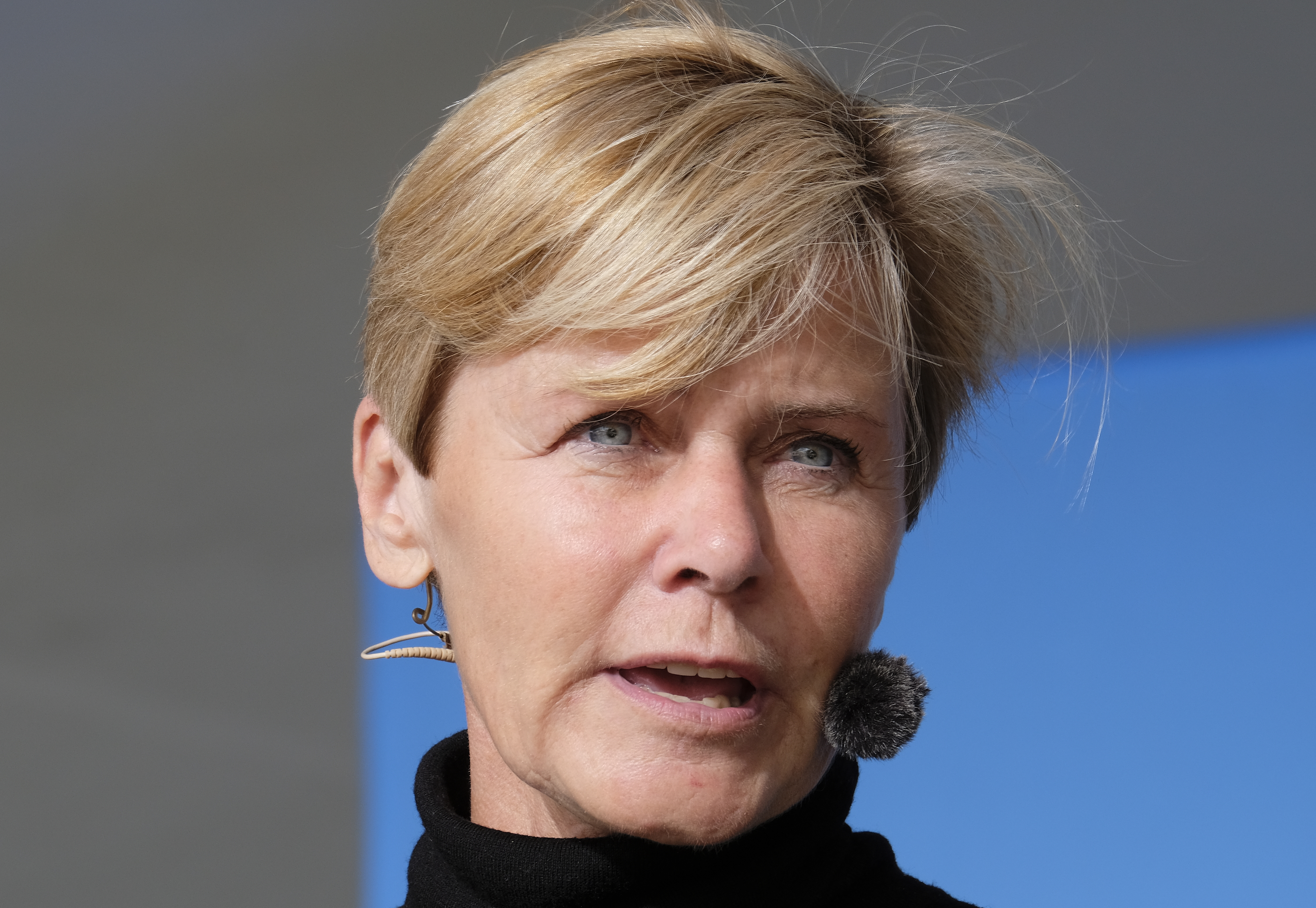
- Mette Bock, 2018

Minister of Culture and Church
- In office 28 November 2016 – 27 June 2019
- Prime Minister: Lars Løkke Rasmussen
- Preceded by: Bertel Haarder
- Succeeded by: Joy Mogensen

Member of the Folketing
- In office 15 September 2011 – 5 June 2019
- Constituency: South Jutland

Personal details
- Born: Mette Samuelsen; 26 July 1957 (age 68) Gladsaxe, Denmark
- Party: Liberal Alliance (since 2010)
- Other political affiliations: Socialist People's Party (1994–1999); Social Liberal Party (1999–2010)

Mette Bock (née Samuelsen, born 26 July 1957 in Gladsaxe) is a Danish political scientist, journalist and former politician. She was a member of the Folketing from 2011 to 2019, representing the Liberal Alliance party. She served as Minister of Culture and Church from 2016 to 2019.

== Background ==
Bock was born in Gladsaxe to Ole Samuelsen and Anna Holm, and is married to Hans Jørn Bock. Anders Samuelsen is her brother. She graduated in philosophy from Odense University and political science from Aarhus University. She worked as a lecturer at Aarhus School of Business and Social Sciences from 1984 to 2002.

== Political career ==
Bock joined the Socialist People's Party for which she ran unsuccessfully in the 1994 parliamentary election. Later, Bock changed her allegiance to the Social Liberal Party for which she ran in the 2001 election, again unsuccessfully. In 2002 she became the editor-in-chief of JydskeVestkysten and the South Danish Media conglomerate. When her brother Anders Samuelsen left the Social Liberal Party to found the New Alliance (later renamed as Liberal Alliance) in 2007, Bock expressed her support for that party, too. She would later join the party. From 2008 to 2009 she was the programme director of the public Danish Broadcasting Corporation.

She was elected representative to the Folketing at the 2011 Danish general election, as a member of Liberal Alliance. She was reelected in the 2015 election. From November 2016 to June 2019 she served as Minister for Culture and Church in the Lars Løkke Rasmussen III Cabinet. In 2019 she ran in the European Parliament election, but failed to get elected. She left politics shortly after the election.

Political offices
Preceded by Bertel Haarder	Minister for Culture and Church; 28 November 2016 – 27 June 2019	Succeeded by Joy Mogensen
