= Peter Rindal =

Danish artist (1923–2009)

- Born: January 19, 1923; Kolding, Denmark
- Died: February 28, 2009 (aged 86)

Peter Rindal (January 19, 1923 — February 28, 2009) was a Danish warehouse manager. Rindalism, the opposition to the funding of public art, was named after him. Rindal was a Member of the Progress Party.
