= Karl Anderson (disambiguation) =

Karl Anderson (born 1980) is an American professional wrestler

Karl Anderson may also refer to:

- Karl Anderson (alpine skier) (born 1953), American former alpine skier
- Karl Anderson (hurdler) (1900–1989), American track and field athlete
- Karl Ricks Anderson (born 1937), Latter-day Saint historian
- Michael Kors (Karl Anderson, Jr., born 1959), American fashion designer

== See also ==
- Carl Anderson (disambiguation)
