= Mørkhøj =

55.727°N 12.464°E

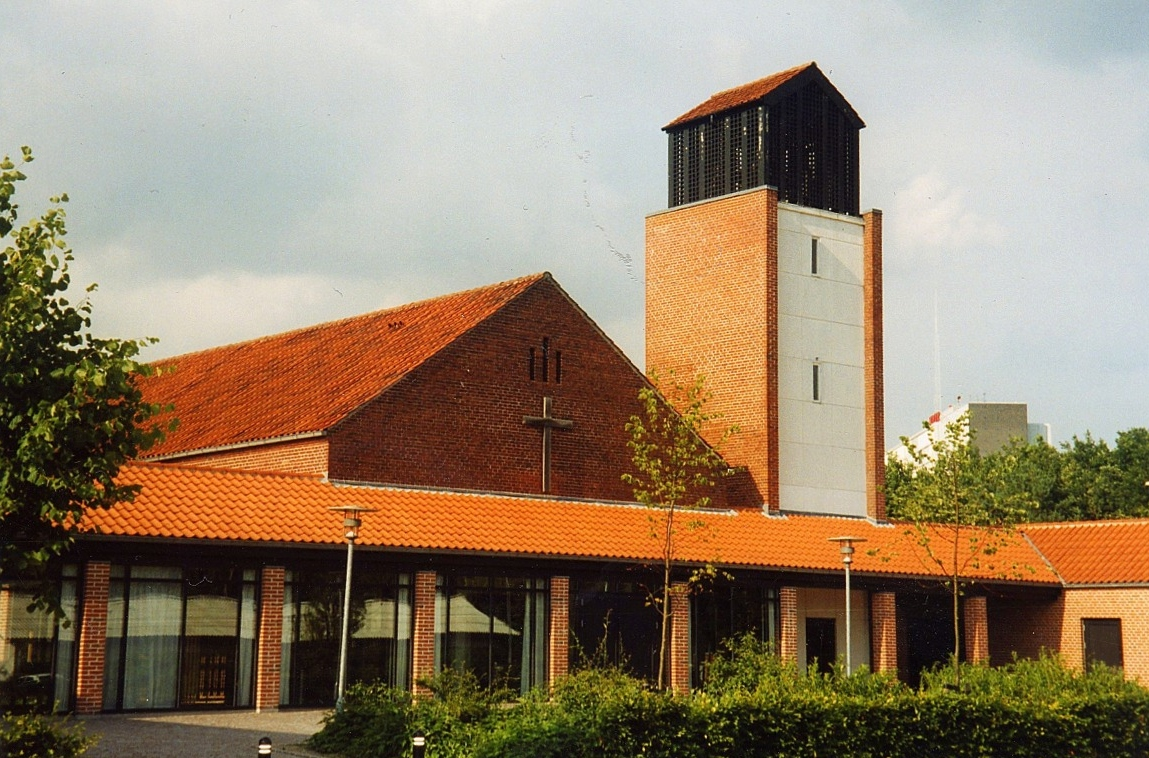
Mørkhøj church

Mørkhøj is a suburb c. 10 kilometres (6.2 mi) northwest of central Copenhagen, Denmark. Mørkhøj is part of Gladsaxe Municipality. The area is mixed with single-family homes and public housing and light industry. It has c. 10000 inhabitants.

== History ==
In 1635, Mørkhøj comprised six arable farms whose principal crops were barley (66%), rye (19%) and oats (13%), cultivated using the three-field system.

In 1682, Mørkhøj comprised nine farms and nine houses without land. The total cultivated land was c. 362 hectares (890 acres).

== Development ==
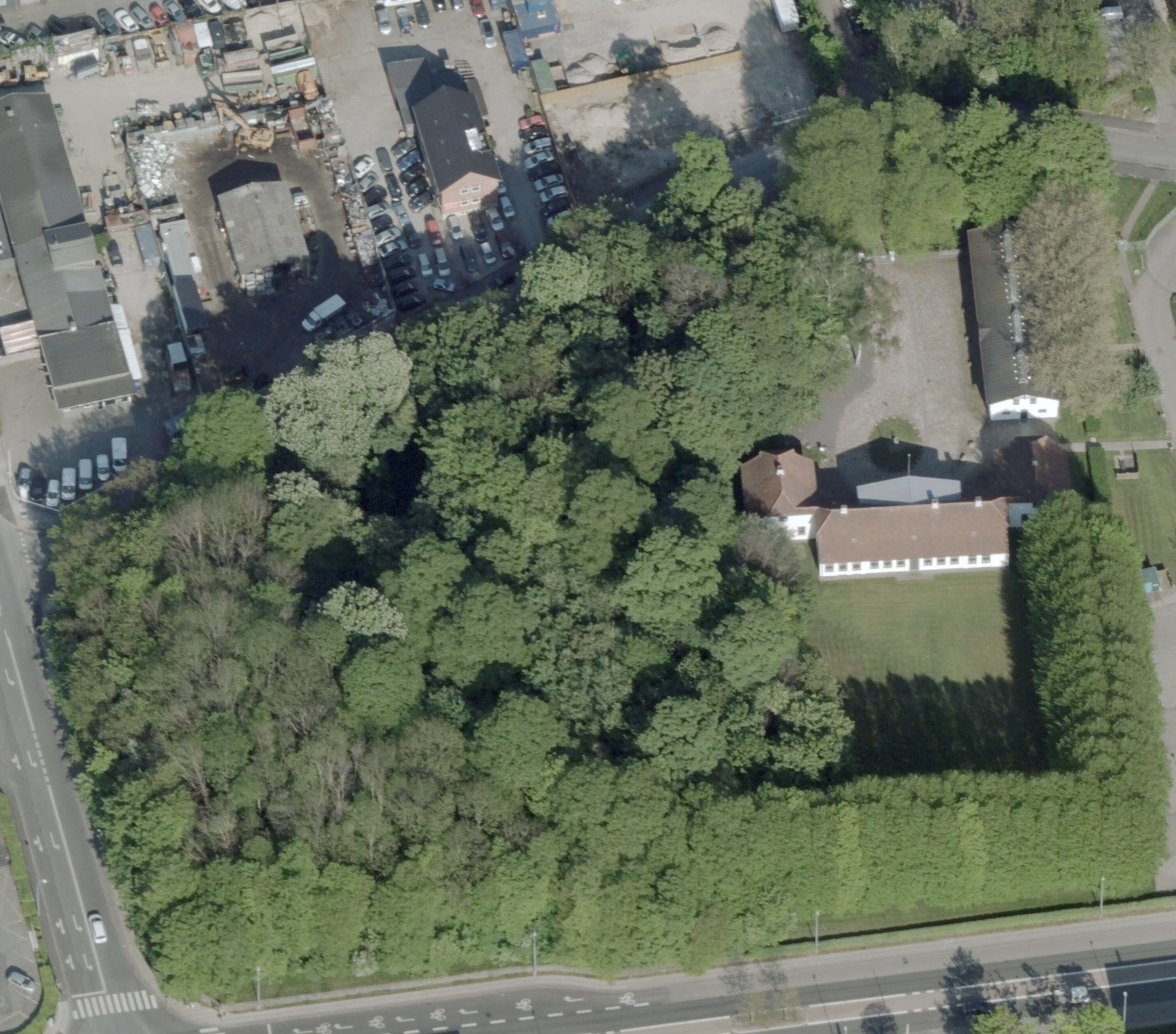
Mørkhøjgård

Of the original village, only the Mørkhøjgård main building remains today. It housed the Danish Veterinary and Food Administration until 2017, and is now proposed for redevelopment.

== Culture ==
The popular Danish children's TV-show Bamses Billedbog was recorded in the Gyngemosen area of Mørkhøj, at the time a forest area, which has since been turned in to an apartment complex. The chimney of the main character Bamses house can be found in the kindergarten Børnehuset Solstrålen, which previously also had the door to the house, which has since been vandalised, and later stolen.

== Education ==
Mørkhøj has two primary schools, Enghavegård skole, and Mørkhøj skole, as well as a teacher's college, called Blaagaard Seminarium.
