= Henrik Dahl (politician) =

Danish author and politician

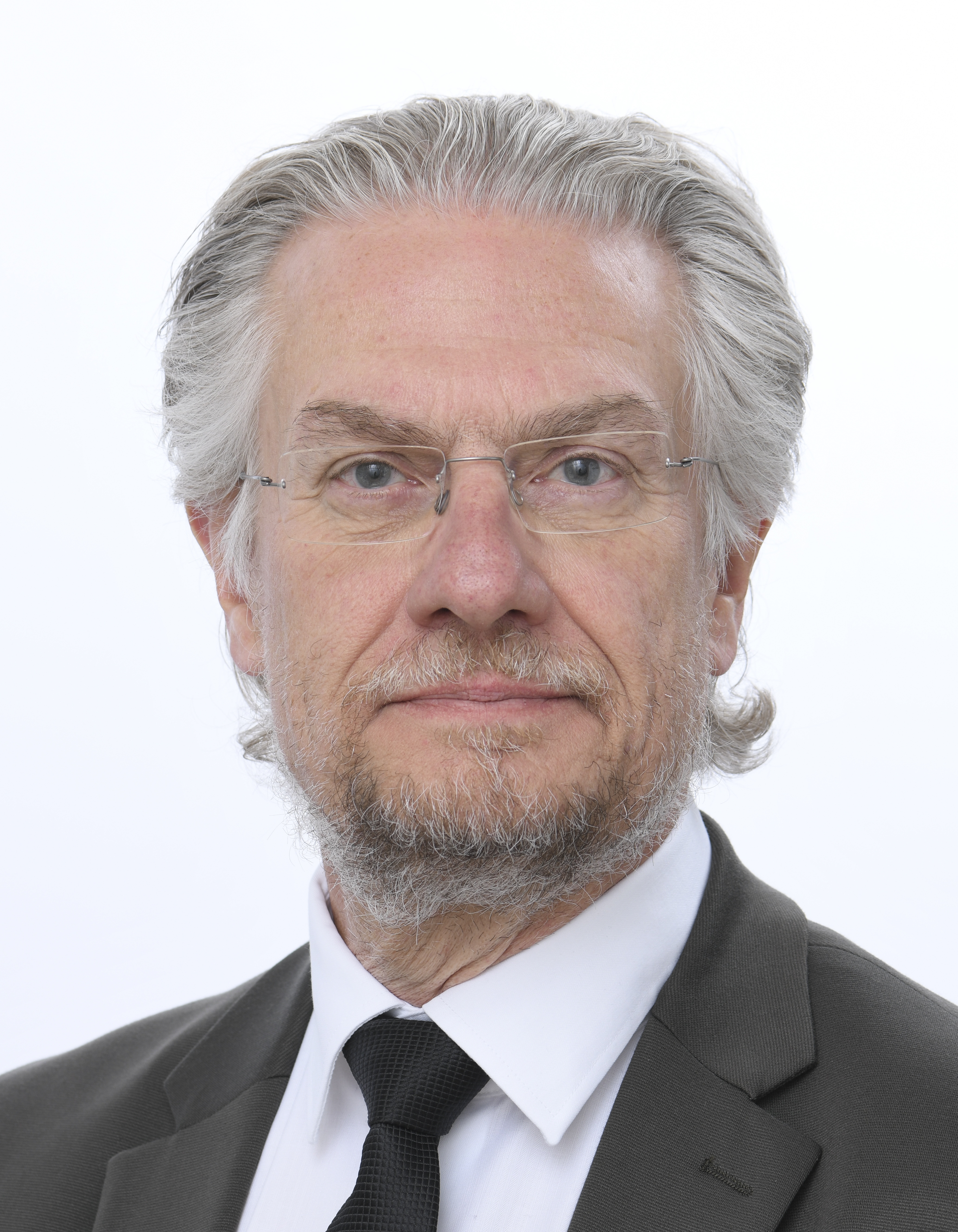
- Official portrait, 2024

Member of the European Parliament for Denmark
- Incumbent
- Assumed office 16 July 2024

Member of the Folketing
- In office 18 June 2015 – 15 July 2024
- Constituency: South Jutland

Personal details
- Born: 20 February 1960 (age 66) Vejlby-Risskov, Denmark
- Party: Liberal Alliance (2014–present)
- Other political affiliations: Social Democrats (formerly)
- Spouse(s): Christine Antorini (m. 2003; div. 2008) Christina Yoon Søttrup
- Children: 3
- Education: Ribe Katedralskole
- Alma mater: University of Copenhagen; University of Pennsylvania; Copenhagen Business School
- Occupation: Interpreter officer • Politician

Johan Henrik Dahl (born 20 February 1960) is a Danish author and politician who since 2024 has been a Member of the European Parliament for the Liberal Alliance. From 2015 to 2024 he was a member of the Folketing.

Dahl first ran for parliament in the 2015 general election, where he was elected with 2,902 votes cast for him. He was reelected in the 2019 election with 1,737 votes.

In Denmark, his book from 1997, Hvis din nabo var en bil (If your neighbor was a car), has been considered a cultural sociological masterpiece. Dahl has described himself as a rindalist.

== Bibliography ==
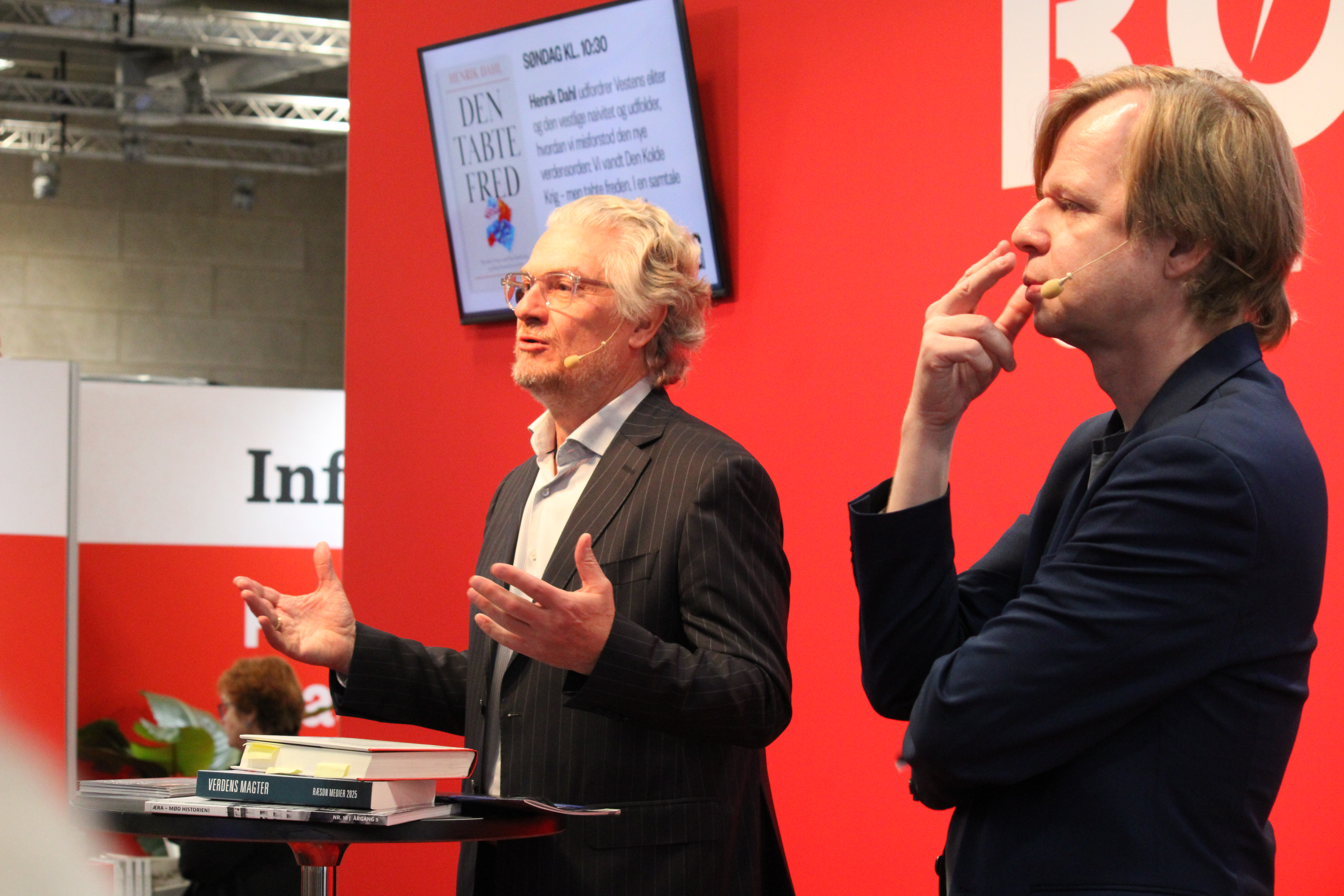
Dahl with Clement Kjersgaard at Bogforum 2025

- Sandheden kort - Christiansborg fra A til Å (People's Press, 2018, co-author)
- NT (People's Press, 2013)
- Spildte kræfter (Gyldendal, 2011)
- Den usynlige verden (Gyldendal, 2008)
- Krigeren, borgeren og taberen (Gyldendal, 2006, co-author)
- Mindernes land (Gyldendal, 2005)
- Epostler (Gyldendal, 2003, co-author)
- Det ny systemskifte (Gyldendal, co-author)
- Borgerlige ord efter revolutionen (Gyldendal, 1999, co-author)
- Den kronologiske uskyld (Gyldendal, 1998)
- Hvis din nabo var en bil (Akademisk Forlag, 1997)
- Marketing og semiotik (Akademisk Forlag, 1993, co-author)
