= Gladsaxe Municipality =

Gladsaxe Municipality Gladsaxe Kommune (Danish)
- Municipality
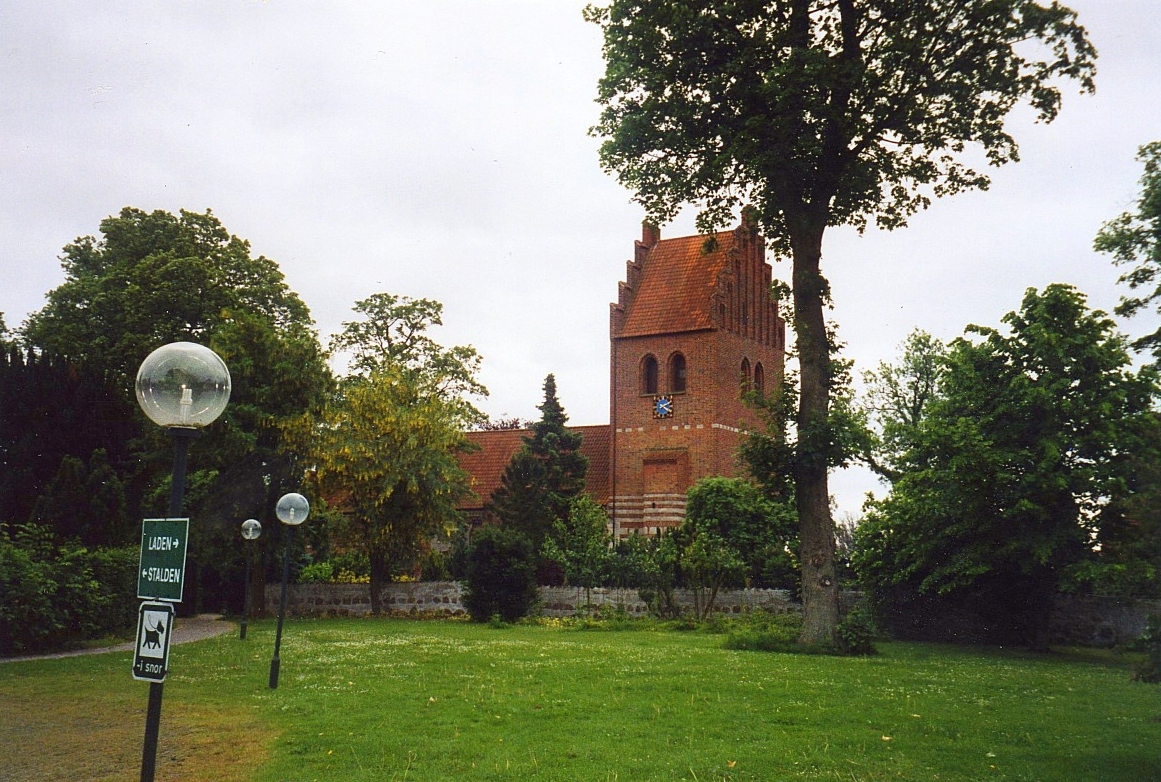
- Gladsaxe Church in Gladsaxe

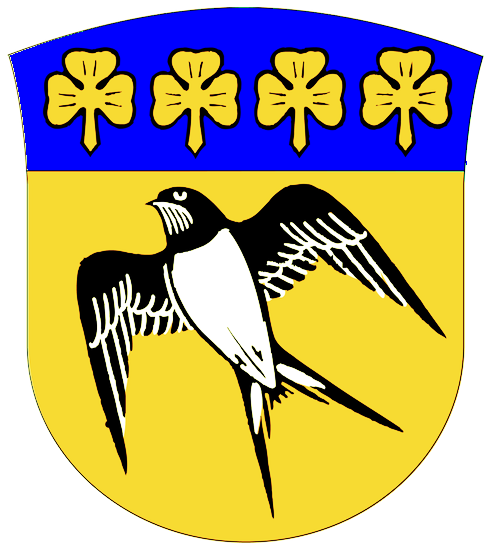
- Coat of arms

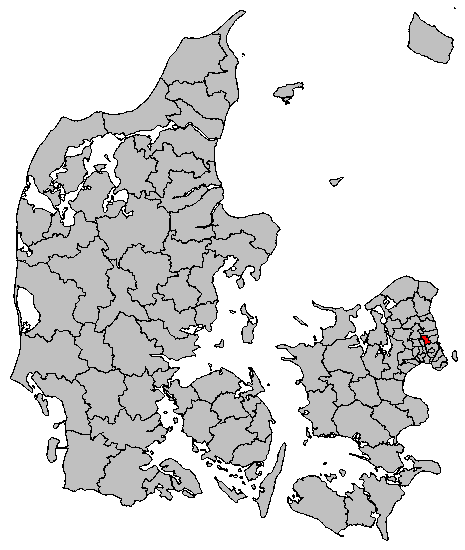
- Coordinates: 55°44′00″N 12°29′00″E
- Country: Denmark
- Region: Hovedstaden
- Established: 1 April 1909
- Seat: Gladsaxe

Government
  - Mayor: Trine Græse (S)

Area
  - Total: 25 km^{2} (9.7 sq mi)

Population (1 January 2026)
  - Total: 71,185
  - Density: 2,800/km^{2} (7,400/sq mi)
- Time zone: UTC+1 (CET)
  - Summer (DST): UTC+2 (CEST)
- Postal code: 2860
- Municipal code: 159
- Website: www.gladsaxe.dk

Gladsaxe Municipality (Danish: Gladsaxe Kommune) is a municipality (Danish, kommune) near Copenhagen in Region Hovedstaden on the island of Zealand (Sjælland) in eastern Denmark. The municipality covers an area of 25 km^{2} (10 sq mi), and has a total population of 71,185 (2026). Its mayor is Trine Græse, a member of the Social Democrats (Socialdemokraterne) political party.

The site of its municipal council is the town of Buddinge. Other towns in the municipality are Gladsaxe, Bagsværd, Mørkhøj and Søborg —but town limits are not distinguishable because the towns have grown together in an urban sprawl. Mørkhøj, Værebro in Bagsværd and Høje-Gladsaxe are larger housing projects and home to many immigrants and being typical for many concrete highrise suburbs in Copenhagen. Picture of Gladsaxe Heights:

At Gladsaxe, there is a 206.5-metre-tall (677 ft) guyed TV mast, which was built in 1955. It was the first TV transmission site in Denmark.

Since 2014, Gladsaxe has been home to Copenhagen gem and mineral show, the largest gem and mineral show in Scandinavia. The show is an annual two-day event that attracts exhibitors from all around the world and an audience of thousands from Denmark and Sweden.

Gladsaxe municipality was not merged with other municipalities by 1 January 2007 as the result of nationwide Kommunalreformen ("The Municipal Reform" of 2007).

== Economy ==
Gladsaxe municipality is home to many company headquarters, including those of Novo, Novozymes, Scandinavian Tobacco Group, and MT Højgaard.

== History ==
According to Gladsaxe-bogen I (which focuses on then Gladsaxe-Herlev municipality up until 1909) by C.L.B. Cramer, humans first settled in Gladsaxe around 10.000 years ago.

In 1670 the parishes of Gladsaxe and Herlev became "rider districts", and every farm had to house a rider/soldier or pay 48 rigsdales yearly. Cramer described "these years as probably some of the most uneasiest years in the parishes long history". In the 1720s the king built a school for riders in Gladsaxe, and his sister, Sophie Hedevig, built a school in Bagsværd. These were the first schools in Gladsaxe. In 1750, Gladsaxe Præstegaard burns down, along with some farms, with many people losing their lives.

In 1945, Søborg School was used to accommodate 500 German refugees, meaning students at that school instead were educated at Marielyst School. This caused the school hours to be reduced from 50 to 40 minutes, with half the students meeting from 8 to 13 o'clock and the other half from 13 to 18 o'clock. In November of that year the refugees could move in at a badminton hall by Gladsaxev Street due to renovations providing room division and heating.

During the 1960s and up until the 2000s, the headquarters of Denmarks Radio, the national broadcaster of Denmark, were located in Gladsaxe. Led Zeppelin, then playing as the New Yardbirds, performed together for the first time in front of a live audience at Gladsaxe Teen Club at the Egegård School (today Gladsaxe School) festive hall, Gladsaxe, Denmark, on 7 September 1968.

In 1977–78, a 19-year-old student from Gladsaxe known as "Bombemanden" (The bomb man) was known for placing pipe bombs in public areas in Copenhagen, such as phoneboxes, hurting four although killing no one.

In 1980, a library, Gladsaxe Hovedbibliotek, opened right by the town hall square, becoming the head library of Gladsaxe.

In 1994, a McDonald's restaurant opened by the Buddinge Center.

== Parks and open spaces ==
Park and green spaces in Gladsaxe Municipality include Aldershvile Slotspark, Bagsværd Fort Folkepark, Bagsværd Sø, Bagsværd Søpark, Gladsaxe Fort Gyngemosen og Høje Gladsaxe Park, Kagsåparken, Nybro Åmose, Radiomarken and Smør- og Fedtmosen.

Almost every year, if not every year, there is a day called "Gladsaxe Day" (Gladsaxedagen in Danish), where people in Gladsaxe come together and celebrate.

== Politics ==
=== Municipal council ===
Gladsaxe's municipal council consists of 25 members, elected every four years.

Below are the municipal councils elected since the Municipal Reform of 2007.

Election	Party								Total seats	Turnout	Elected mayor
Election	A	B	C	F	I	O	V	Ø	Total seats	Turnout	Elected mayor
2005	11	1	2	2		2	4	3	25	66.3%	Karin Søjberg Holst (A)
2009	9	1	3	5		2	4	1	25	62.7%	Karin Søjberg Holst (A)
2013	10	1	1	2	1	3	4	3	25	68.4%	Karin Søjberg Holst (A)
2017	10	2	1	2		2	5	3	25	65.7%	Trine Græse (A)
2021 (Note: One seat went to Lokallisten Gladsaxe, a local party.)	8	2	3	3		1	4	3	25	62.4%	Trine Græse (A)
Data from Kmdvalg.dk 2005, 2009, 2013, 2017 and 2021

== Twin towns – sister cities ==
Gladsaxe is twinned with:

- Charlottenburg-Wilmersdorf (Berlin), Berlin, Germany
- Gagny, France
- Haabersti (Tallinn), Estonia
- Klagenfurt, Austria
- Koszalin, Poland
- Minden, Germany
- Narsaq, Kujalleq, Greenland
- Neubrandenburg, Germany
- Paisley, Scotland, United Kingdom
- Pirkkala, Finland
- Ski, Norway
- Solna, Sweden
- Split, Croatia
- Sutton, England, United Kingdom
- Taitō (Tokyo), Tokyo, Japan
- Veszprém, Hungary

== Notable people ==
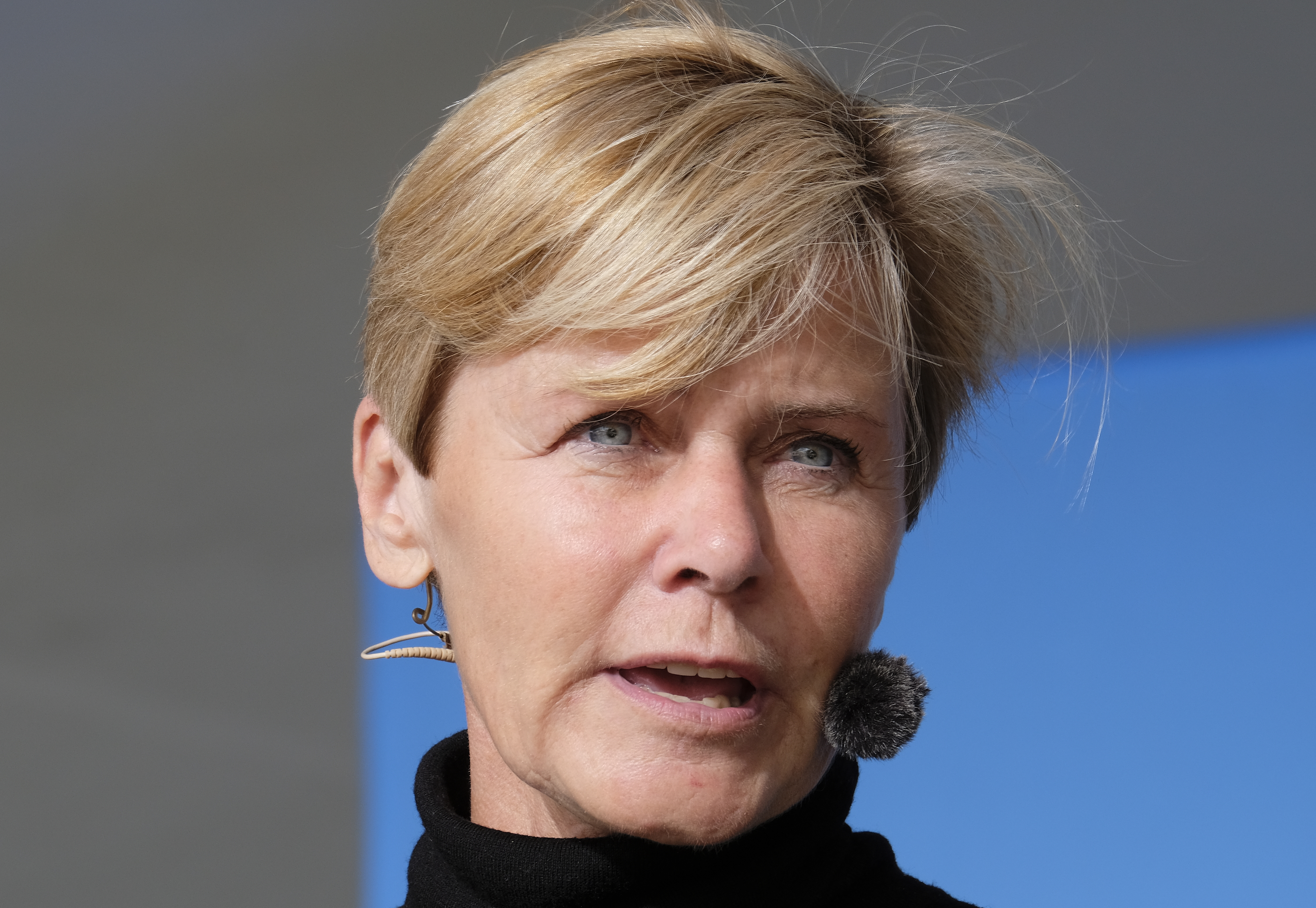
Mette Bock

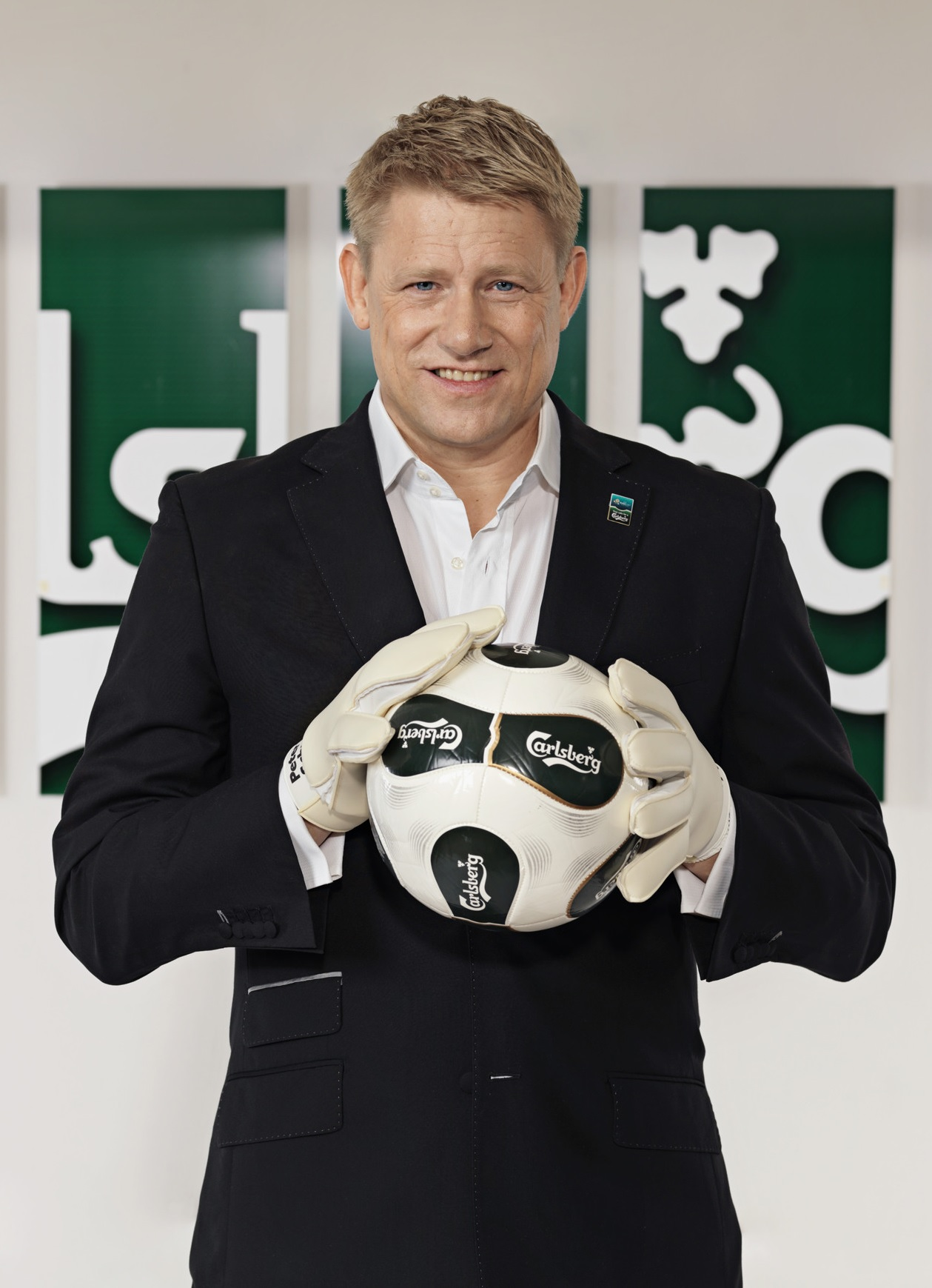
Peter Schmeichel

- Nancy Eriksson (1907–1984), Swedish politician and a member of the Swedish Riksdag
- Thomas Rørdam (born 1952), lawyer, President of the Supreme Court of Denmark
- Mette Bock (born 1957), political scientist, journalist and politician
- Allan Steen Kristensen (1958–1997), criminal
- Thomas Bo Larsen (born 1963), actor
- Lars Mikkelsen (born 1964), actor
- Jonatan Spang (born 1978), standup comedian, actor and theatre director

=== Sport ===
- Frederik Hansen (1885–1981), wrestler
- Per Frimann (born 1962), footballer
- Peter Schmeichel MBE (born 1963), footballer
- Bo Spellerberg (born 1979), handballer
- Chanan Colman (born 1984), Danish-Israeli basketball player
- Louise Mai Jansen (born 1984), swimmer
- Daniel Wass (born 1989), footballer
