= Liberal Alliance Youth =

Youth wing of the Liberal Alliance, a Danish political party

Liberal Alliance Youth Liberal Alliances Ungdom
- Chairperson: Ezekiel Rohde
- Vice-Chairperson: Simone Nielsen
- Founded: 22 February 2008
- Membership: 700
- Ideology: Classical liberalism
- Mother party: Liberal Alliance
- International affiliation: Nordic Youth Council
- Nordic affiliation: Nordens Liberale Ungdom (NLU)

Liberal Alliance Youth (Danish: Liberal Alliances Ungdom) is the youth wing of the Liberal Alliance, a political party in Denmark.

== History ==
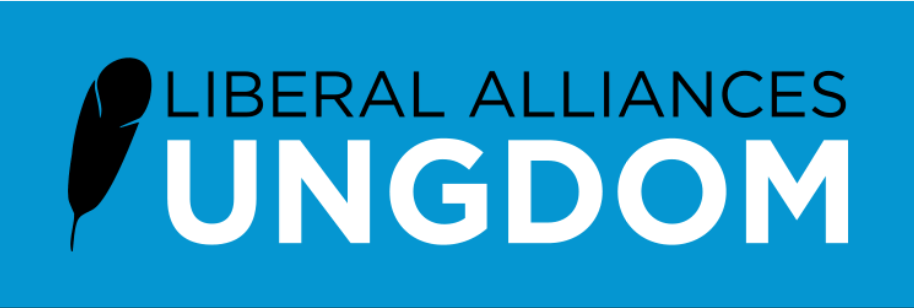
Former logo

The organization was formed by 21 people under the name of Young Alliance (Danish: Ung Alliance), on 22 February 2008 in Christiansborg. Following the parent party's name change from New Alliance to Liberal Alliance in August 2008, the youth organization also changed its name to Liberal Alliance Youth on 31 January 2009.

In the period between 2008 and 2022, the organisation had a total of 11 chairmen. Between 2014 and 2016 Alex Vanopslagh, who is now the leader of Liberal Alliance, was the chairman.

== Ideology ==
Liberal Alliance Youth bases its policies on the desire for a smaller state, more personal freedom and lower taxes. Among other things, they have focused on areas such as the right to trade union freedom, freedom of diversity, opposition to wind turbine energy, legalization of drugs, bans on circumcision and criticised deficits in public finances, as well as high taxes.

The policies covers a wide range of topics, all of which are attributed to the party's liberal roots, and the youth party has previously criticised the Liberal Alliance for being too center-right and pragmatic.

== Membership ==
According to the official 2021 statement of the Danish Youth Council (DUF), the Liberal Alliance Youth had over 700 members and 10 local branches.
