= Liberal Alliance (Denmark) =

- Abbreviation: LA; I (Note: Official party letter on voting ballot)
- Leader: Alex Vanopslagh
- Founder: Naser Khader (NA), Anders Samuelsen (LA)
- Founded: 7 May 2007 (Note: as New Alliance); 27 August 2008 (Note: as Liberal Alliance)
- Split from: Social Liberal Party; Conservative People's Party
- Headquarters: Nybrogade 10 3.sal DK-1203 København K
- Youth wing: Liberal Alliance Youth
- Membership (2024): ▲6,742
- Ideology: Classical liberalism Right-libertarianism
- Political position: Centre-right to right-wing
- European Parliament group: European People's Party Group
- Nordic affiliation: Centre Group
- Council of Europe affiliation: ALDE-PACE
- Colours: Navy blue (official); Turquoise (customary); Plum
- Folketing (Note: Only 175 of the 179 seats in the Danish Parliament, the Folketing, are obtainable by Danish political parties as Greenland and the Faroe Islands are assigned two seats each due to their status as territories in the Kingdom of Denmark.): 15 / 179
- European Parliament: 1 / 15
- Regions: 3 / 205
- Municipalities: 125 / 2,436

Election symbol
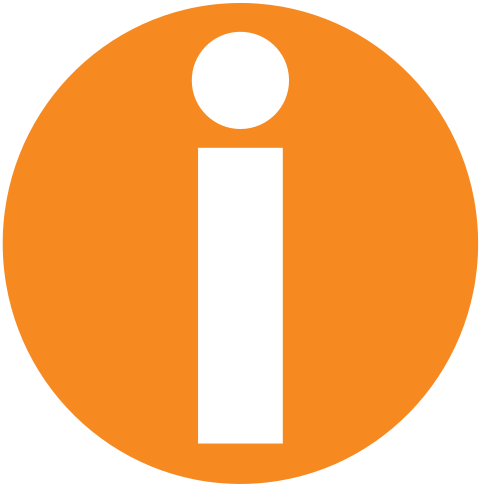

Website
- liberalalliance.dk

Liberal Alliance (LA; Danish: [lipəˈʁɑˀl æliˈɑŋsə]) is a classical liberal and right-libertarian political party in Denmark. The party is a component of the centre-right bloc in Danish politics. The party's platform is based upon economic liberalism, promotion of tax cuts, reduction of welfare programmes, socially libertarian policies, and a pragmatic, but oppositional stance towards European integration.

From November 2016 to June 2019, the Liberal Alliance (I) was part of the Lars Løkke Rasmussen III Cabinet a three-party coalition government, alongside Liberal Party (Danish: Venstre) and the Conservative People's Party (Danish: Det Konservative Folkeparti). At the 2022 Danish general election, the party won 14 seats. It has 15 seats after Pernille Vermund chose to join the party.

== History ==
=== New Alliance (2007–2009) ===
The party was founded as the New Alliance (Danish: Ny Alliance)^{da} on 7 May 2007 by MP Naser Khader and MEP Anders Samuelsen from the Social Liberal Party and Gitte Seeberg, a Conservative People's Party MEP. The party supported the government of the Venstre and Conservative People's Party also endorsed by the Danish People's Party. To comply with Danish election law and to be able to stand for elections the New Alliance had to gather 19,185 signatures of supporters on special forms, the number being equivalent to one parliamentary seat in the Folketing. Each completed form had to be certified with the civil registry offices of municipalities before being collectively handed in to the Ministry of the Interior. While the New Alliance did not take any stand on this offer, the minor party Centre Democrats offered to let the New Alliance put forward candidates on their lists in the event of an election being called before the New Alliance had finished its nomination process.

On one occasion on 12 May 2007 in Horsens, the three leading figures of the party managed to collect over 2,000 signatures in one day. On 21 May, the party reported they were half-way, having gathered in 10,000 signatures with the requirement being 19,185 (1/175 of the votes cast at the latest general election). The party completed its nomination process on 29 June by being accepted on the Ministry of the Interior's list of parties eligible stand for election to the Folketing after handing in the 21,516 required signatures and was given the party letter Y. Immediately after its creation, the New Alliance had a surge of members. Just one day after the announcement of the party, more than 12,000 had registered on the party website. Three days later, 16,000 had registered and 8,000 of these had paid the membership fee.

On 30 August 2007, the party publicly launched a policy programme. Some of the points in this programme included longer mandatory school attendance, with free food and homework aid; a European Marshall Plan to the Middle East; increasing foreign aid to 1% of GDP; increased focus on prevention in public health, with lower prices on healthy foods; and an exhaustive reform related to immigration and asylum politics. In the 2007 general election held on 13 November 2007, the party won 2.8% of the vote, winning 5 of 179 seats in the Danish Parliament.

=== Rebranding and Samuelsen leadership (2008–2019) ===
On 29 January 2008, founding member Gitte Seeberg left the party in protest against the party's status as a right-wing party which conflicted with her own desire to form a centrist party with the goal of mitigating the influence of the Danish People's Party. On 5 February 2008, Malou Aamund, another of the party's members of parliament, left the party and joined the governing party Venstre. On 24 June 2008, Jørgen Poulsen was excluded from the Liberal Alliance's parliamentary group, although not from the party itself. Under the new leadership of Anders Samuelsen, the party position moved towards the right, espousing economic liberalism and right-libertarian policies, with the party changing its name to the Liberal Alliance on 27 August 2008.

On 1 September 2008, the party regained a third mandate in the parliament as Gitte Seeberg was appointed secretary general of the Danish branch of the World Wide Fund for Nature (WWF). Her mandate was given to former deputy mayor of Slagelse, Villum Christensen. On 5 January 2009, founding member and party leader Naser Khader left the party, citing that he did not believe in it any longer. At the time, Anders Samuelsen was scheduled to take over leadership of the party later that month. That same day, Villum Christensen expressed doubt on his future in the party. After Khader's exit a 2009 documentary titled Dagbog fra midten (Diary from the Centre) documenting the party's founding and eventual collapse was released with scenes detailing internal disagreements between the party's lead members. Khader eventually joined the Conservatives who he represented as an MP from 2009–2011 and 2015–2021 where he after a period as an independent left politics for good in 2022.

In the 2009 European Parliament election, the party won 0.6% of the vote, leaving the party without representation in the European parliament. In the 2011 general election held on 15 September 2011, the party won 5.0% of the vote and 9 seats. When Malou Aamund resigned from the Folketing in June 2011, she was replaced by Professor Niels Høiby, who took his seat with the Liberal Alliance, taking their contingent in four. In the 2014 European Parliament election, the Liberal Alliance received 2.9% of the vote, again failing to return any MEPs.

In the 2015 general election held on 18 June 2015, the party won 7.5% of the vote and 13 seats in the Folketing. In its most successful constituency, Gentofte Municipality, a well-off suburb of Copenhagen, it even scored 17.5% while on Bornholm its share of votes was only 4%. Initially, the party did not participate in Lars Løkke Rasmussen's Venstre minority cabinet, but it did lent its parliamentary support to the government.

==== Participation in third Løkke government ====
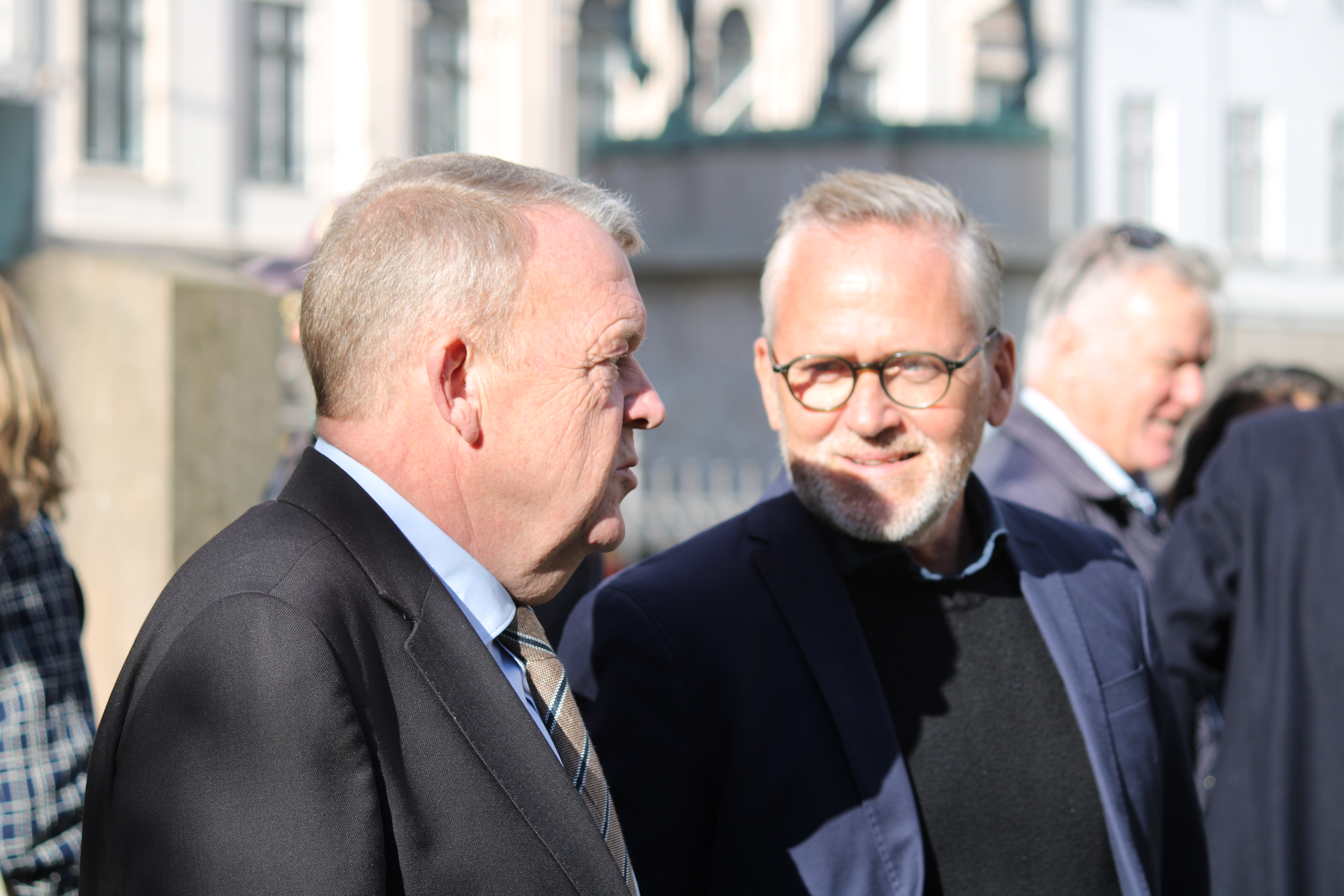
Lars Løkke Rasmussen (to the left) and Anders Samuelsen

In late November 2016, it joined a three-party centre-right coalition government alongside Venstre and the Conservative People's Party in Løkke Rasmussen's third government. Party leader Anders Samuelsen was appointed Minister of Foreign Affairs while Simon Emil Ammitzbøll-Bille took the post of Minister of the Economy and Interior. Additional cabinet members of Liberal Alliance were Merete Riisager (Minister of Education), Mette Bock (Minister of Culture), Ole Birk Olesen (Minister of Transport) and Thyra Frank (Minister for Elder Affairs).

At the 2019 general election held on 5 June 2019, the party won 2.3% of the vote, losing 9 of its 13 seats in the Folketing. At the same time, party leader Anders Samuelsen failed to get reelected, leading him to resign the following day.

=== Vanopslagh leadership (2019–present) ===
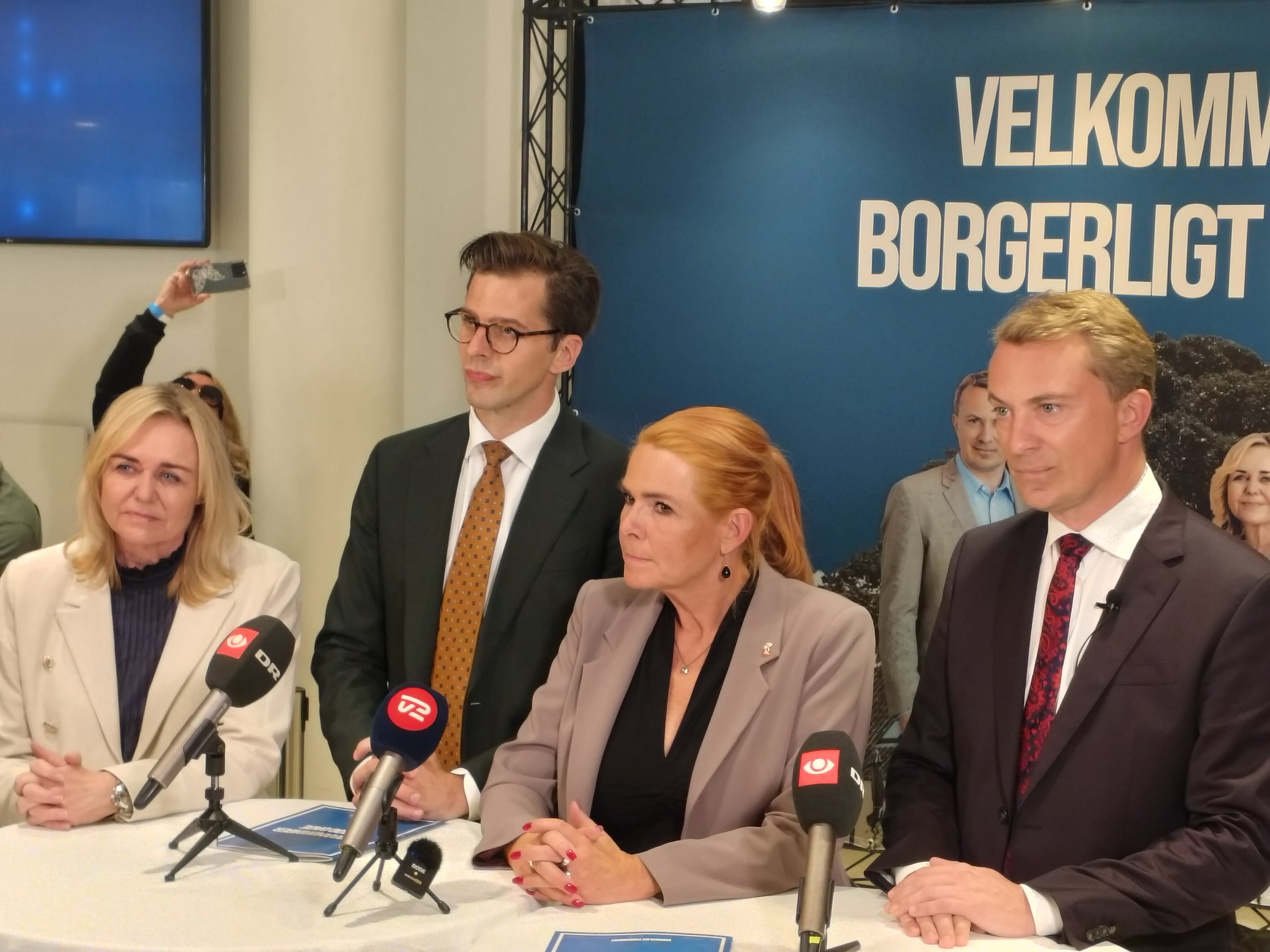
Vanopslagh at a press conference with leaders of other right-wing parties: Mona Juul, Inger Støjberg and Morten Messerschmidt.

On 9 June 2019, Alex Vanopslagh became the new leader of the Liberal Alliance with MP Simon Emil Ammitzbøll-Bille leaving the LA on 23 October attributing political disagreements as the reason. At the 2021 local elections, LA achieved its first ever mayor with LA candidate Emil Blücher becoming mayor in Solrød Municipality. During the election campaign to the 2022 general election, the party ran on a campaign called Du kan godt roughly translating to 'You can' or 'Yes, you can'. Furthermore, Vanopslagh managed to acquire a large following on the social media platform TikTok especially engaging younger voters. At that election, the party received its best ever result receiving 7.9% equal to 14 seats making it the joint fifth-largest party in the Folketing alongside the Denmark Democrats. Following the formation of the SVM government, the LA is currently in opposition. On 17 January 2024, Pernille Vermund, the former leader of New Right, announced that she had joined the party.

In the 2025 Danish local elections, the party enjoyed its best result ever in a local election, gaining a second mayoral title, and increasing its amount of councillors by over 13 times. In the 2026 general election, the party received its best ever result, winning 16 seats and 9.4% of the vote.

== Ideology and platform ==
Located on the centre-right to right-wing of the political spectrum, the Liberal Alliance has been described in ideology as liberal, classical liberal, libertarian, and right-wing libertarian.

The original New Alliance considered itself a centrist party, "taking the best values of social liberalism and social conservatism". By using these two terms, the New Alliance positioned itself equidistant between the former parties of its founding members. Social liberalism is the official ideology of the Danish Social Liberal Party whereas social conservatism is a term sometimes invoked by members of the Conservative People's Party who stress the support of the welfare society such as Liberal Alliance co-founder Gitte Seeberg. In the earliest days of the party's existence, the party was accused of populism or personalism, still lacking stances on many topics and based on the popularity of Naser Khader. After Gitte Seeberg left the party, the "social conservatism" part was dropped and the party name was changed to the Liberal Alliance. However, there were still considerable ideological differences among the two remaining founders and it was not until Naser Khader was replaced by Anders Samuelsen that the party took on a more classical liberal identity. The party has proposed extensive economic liberal reforms, including a tax reform replacing progressive income tax with a flat-rate income tax of 40%, halving rates of corporation tax, instigating user charges for public healthcare, abolishing early retirement schemes and reassessing everyone receiving disability benefits.

In 2011, the party opposed the government's entry of Denmark into the Euro Plus Pact and continues to maintain a staunch opposition to Denmark entering the eurozone. On the matter of European Union membership, the party supports a smaller European Union based primarily on "free trade, liberty and peace" and in 2022 called for a "slimmed down" EU, giving more power back to the smaller communities. The Liberal Alliance is famously the party in Denmark that pushes for nuclear power the hardest. In 2009, the party voted against subsidies for environmentalist renovations without significant tax cuts. Besides that, the Liberal Alliance prides itself in having one of the most ambitious environmental policy programs of any party. They are against what they call "climate-nationalism", and argue that Denmark should be a forerunner and create the solutions which will be used in the rest of the world too. In 2011, the Red–Green Alliance and the Liberal Alliance were the only parties whose MPs supported equalising MPs' age of retirement with the rest of the country.

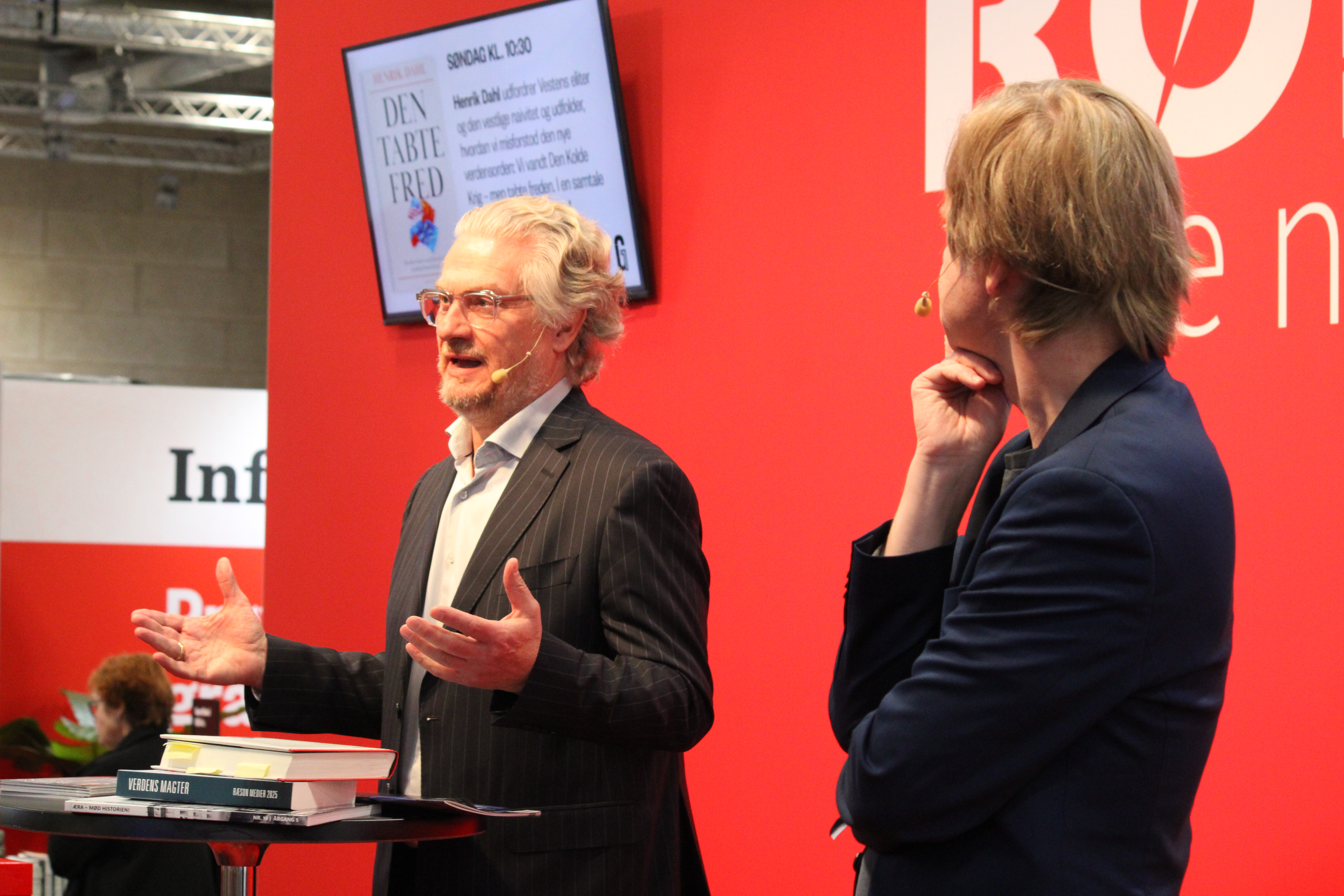
Henrik Dahl speaking at the Danish book fair Bogforum in 2025

The Liberal Alliance has supported the rights of same-sex couples to marry and adopt, helping to pass both into law. The party opposed the reintroduction of border controls in 2011 and supported the dismantling of them later in that year. It supports ending the ban on foreigners owning holiday homes in Denmark. On 30 August 2011, with 5.0% voter support, Simon Emil Ammitzbøll-Bille told on air to Danish Radio that a vote for the Liberal Alliance is a vote for free hashish. Voter support increased to 7.5% following the statement. In parliament, the party supported the reduction of vehicle registration fees.

After 2019, some members of Liberal Alliance, particularly Henrik Dahl, have become vocally critical of what it deems as "woke ideology" in universities and public education. The party is opposed to gender-change surgery for minors. Some members are also critical of involving gender politics in educational areas.

== Organisation ==
=== Former logos ===
2011–2016

2016–2019

=== Leaders ===
The party has had the following leaders since its foundation:

No.	Portrait	Leader	Took office	Left office	Time in office	Ref.
1	Naser Khader	Naser Khader (born 1963)	7 May 2007	5 January 2009	1 year, 243 days	
2	Anders Samuelsen	Anders Samuelsen (born 1967)	5 January 2009	6 June 2019	10 years, 152 days	
3	Alex Vanopslagh	Alex Vanopslagh (born 1991)	9 June 2019	Incumbent	7 years, 153 days	

=== Funding ===
The party received donations from the investment bank Saxo Bank (500,000 Danish kroner) and the businessman Lars Kolind (100,000 kroner). As of 22 May 2007, the party had seven paid employees and a number of volunteers. The party announced it would not hire additional employees until it had more funds.

=== Liberal Alliance Youth ===
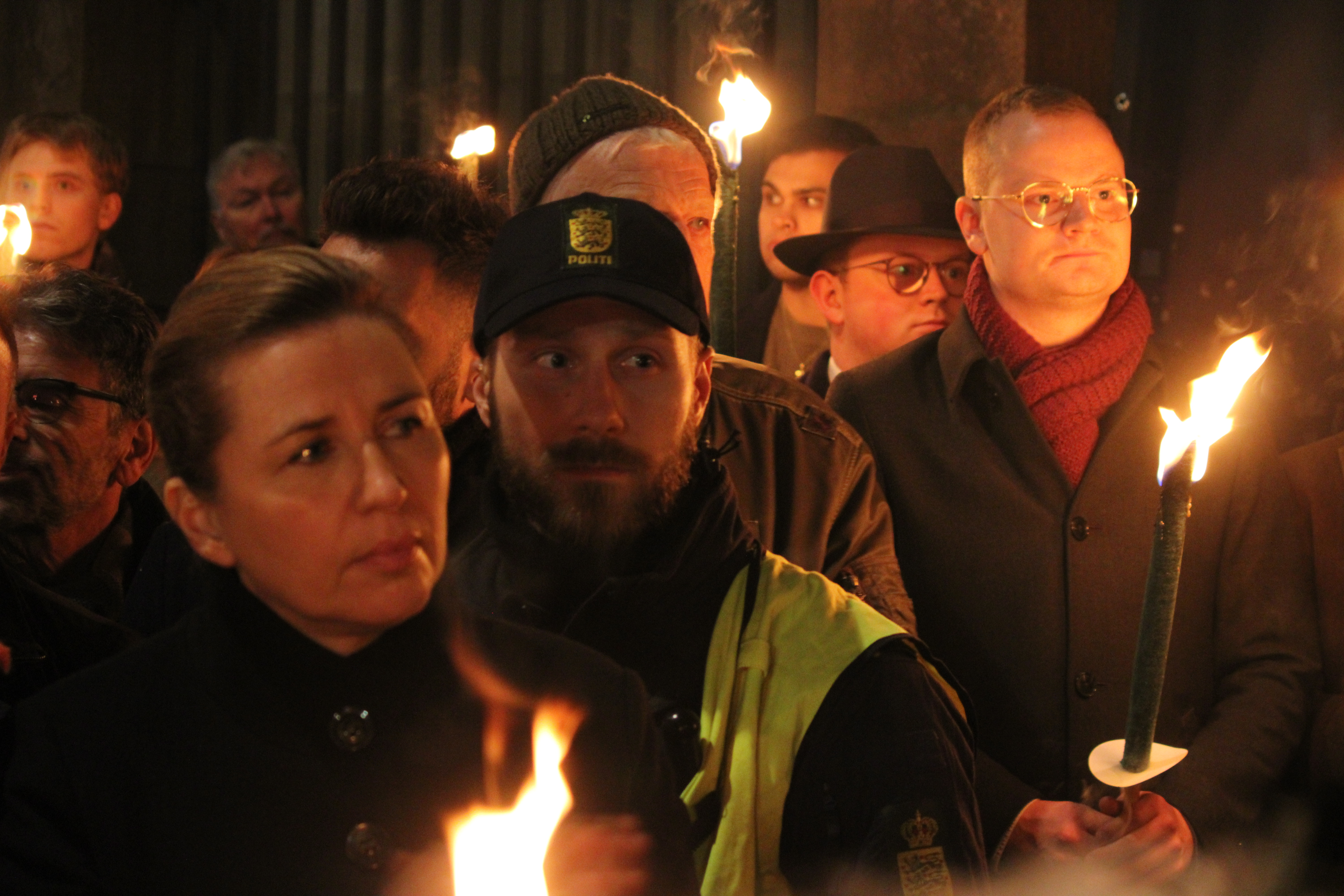
Tobias Jæger Pagh (red scarf) at a 2025 Kristallnacht remembrance event. Prime minister Mette Frederiksen seen in the front

On 23 February 2008, a youth wing to the party was formed by 21 people under the name of Young Alliance (Danish: Ung Alliance). When the party changed its name to the Liberal Alliance, the youth branch followed suit changing its name to the Liberal Alliance Youth (Liberal Alliances Ungdom) whose current chairman is Tobias Jæger Pagh.

=== European parliament affiliation ===
At its formation, two MEPs joined the party. With the defection of MEPs Gitte Seeberg and Anders Samuelsen, the Conservatives and the Danish Social Liberal Party were effectively left without representation in the European Parliament. The two MEPs did stay in their parliamentary groups (EPP-ED and ALDE, respectively). Both resigned from the European Parliament after being elected to the Danish Parliament in November 2007. The Liberal Alliance announced that it would join the ALDE group after future European Parliament elections. However, the party failed to achieve representation in the European Parliament in both the 2009, 2014 and 2019 European Parliament elections. At the 2024 elections, Henrik Dahl, national MP for the party since 2015, was elected to the European Parliament. Before the election, the party had announced that rather than seeking to join the liberal Renew Europe group (previously ALDE), they would apply to join the conservative EPP group.-

== Election results ==
=== Parliament ===
Election	Votes	%	Seats	+/-	Government
2007	97,295	2.8 (#7)	5 / 179	▲5	Opposition
2011	176,585	5.0 (#7)	9 / 179	▲4	Opposition
2015	265,129	7.5 (#5)	13 / 179	▲4	External support (2015–2016)
2015	265,129	7.5 (#5)	13 / 179	▲4	Coalition (2016–2019)
2019	82,228	2.3 (#10)	4 / 179	▼9	Opposition
2022	278,656	7.9 (#6)	14 / 179	▲10	Opposition
2026	334,421	9.4 (#4)	16 / 179	▲2	Opposition

=== Local elections ===
Municipal elections

Year	Seats	
Year	#	±
2009	1 / 2,468	New
2013	33 / 2,444	▲32
2017	28 / 2,432	▼5
2021	9 / 2,436	▼19
2025	125 / 2,432	▲116

Regional elections

Year	Seats	
Year	#	±
2009	0 / 205	New
2013	5 / 205	▲5
2017	5 / 205	0
2021	0 / 205	▼5
2025	8 / 134	▲8

Mayors

Year	Seats	
Year	No.	±
2009	0 / 98	0
2013	0 / 98	0
2017	0 / 98	0
2021	1 / 98	▲1
2025	2 / 98	▲1

=== European Parliament ===
Year	List leader	Votes	%	Seats	+/–	EP Group
2009	Benjamin Dickow	13,796	0.59 (#9)	0 / 13	New	–
2014	Christina Egelund	65,480	2.88 (#8)	0 / 13	0	–
2019	Mette Bock	60,693	2.20 (#10)	0 / 14	0	–
2024	Henrik Dahl	170,199	6.95 (#8)	1 / 15	▲1	EPP

=== Party Congresses ===
- 1. landsmøde 2024 13. april

== See also ==
- Liberal Initiative (Portugal)
- List of political parties in Denmark
