= Trine Mach =

Danish politician (born 1969)

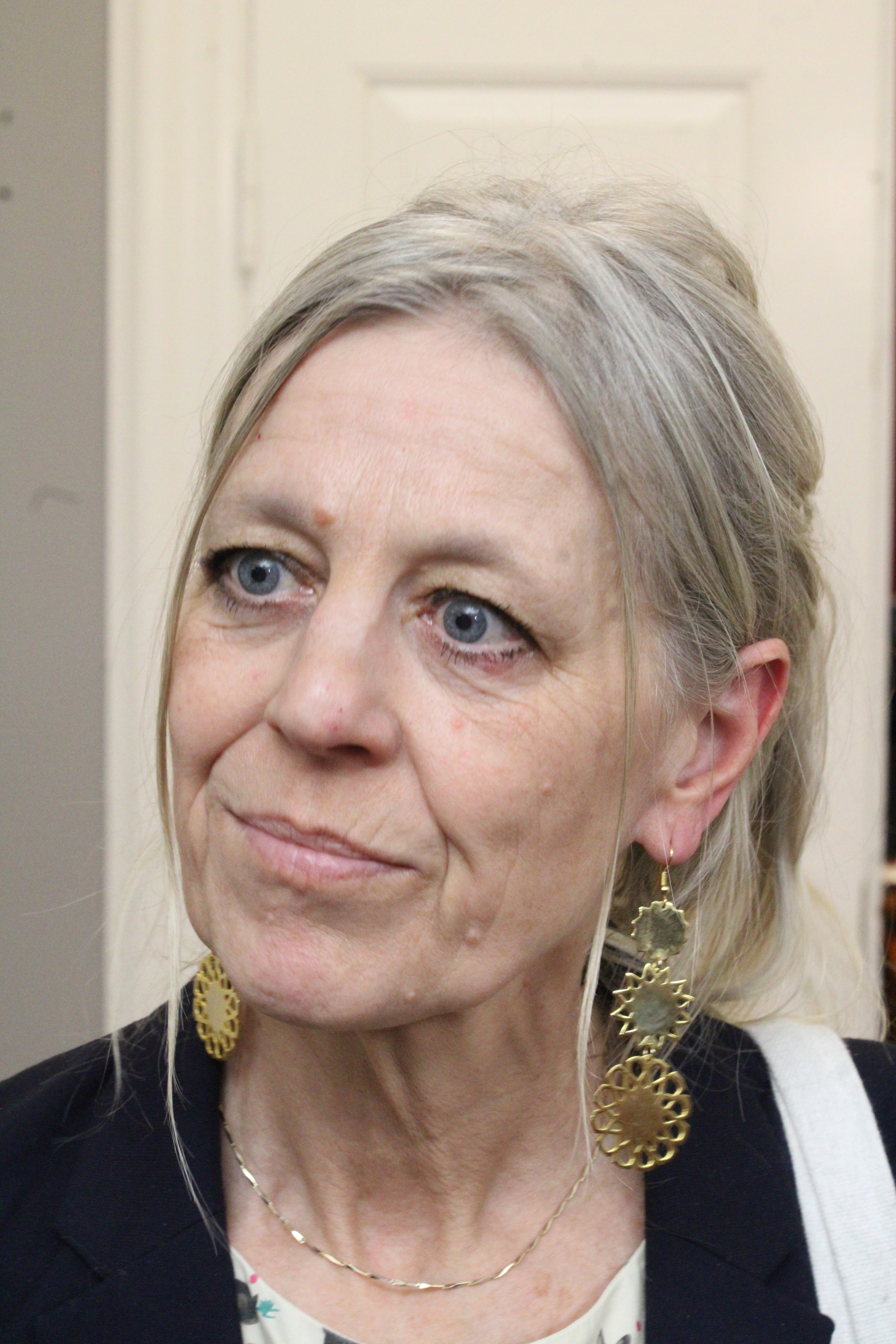
- Pertou Mach in 2026

Member of the Folketing
- Incumbent
- Assumed office 1 November 2022
- Constituency: Zealand
- In office 21 December 2013 – 18 June 2015
- Preceded by: Villy Søvndal
- Constituency: Copenhagen

Personal details
- Born: October 9, 1969 (age 56) Bredal, Denmark
- Party: Red-Green Alliance (since 2021)
- Other political affiliations: Green Left (until 2015)
- Children: 3
- Education: Aarhus University

Trine Pertou Mach (born 9 October 1969) is a Danish politician serving as Member of the Folketing for the Red–Green Alliance since the 2022 election. She previously served as Member of the Folketing for the Green Left from 2013 to 2015, but switched to the Red-Green Alliance in 2022.

== Career ==
Studying political science at Aarhus University, Mach graduated in 1998 and went on to work in the European government, at the WWF and Danish Institute for Human Rights.

Mach served two brief stints from April 2009 and January 2011 to May 2009 and June 2011 respectively in the Folketing for the Green Left as a substitute for Ida Auken, having failed to win her own seat in 2007.

In 2013 Mach replaced then Green Left leader Villy Søvndal as Member of the Folketing after he suffered a heart attack and quit politics. Mach had previously dropped her candidacy in 2012 as a protest against Søvndal's party line.

Having left the Green Left in 2015, Mach joined the Red–Green Alliance on 11 November 2021, initially stating she had no intention to return to politics, but later becoming the party's top candidate in the Zealand constituency for the 2022 election on 31 May 2022. Mach won a seat in said election with 1,737 personal votes.

== Personal life ==
Mach is married and has three children.
