= Pernille Skipper =

Danish politician (born 1984)

Pernille Skipper MP
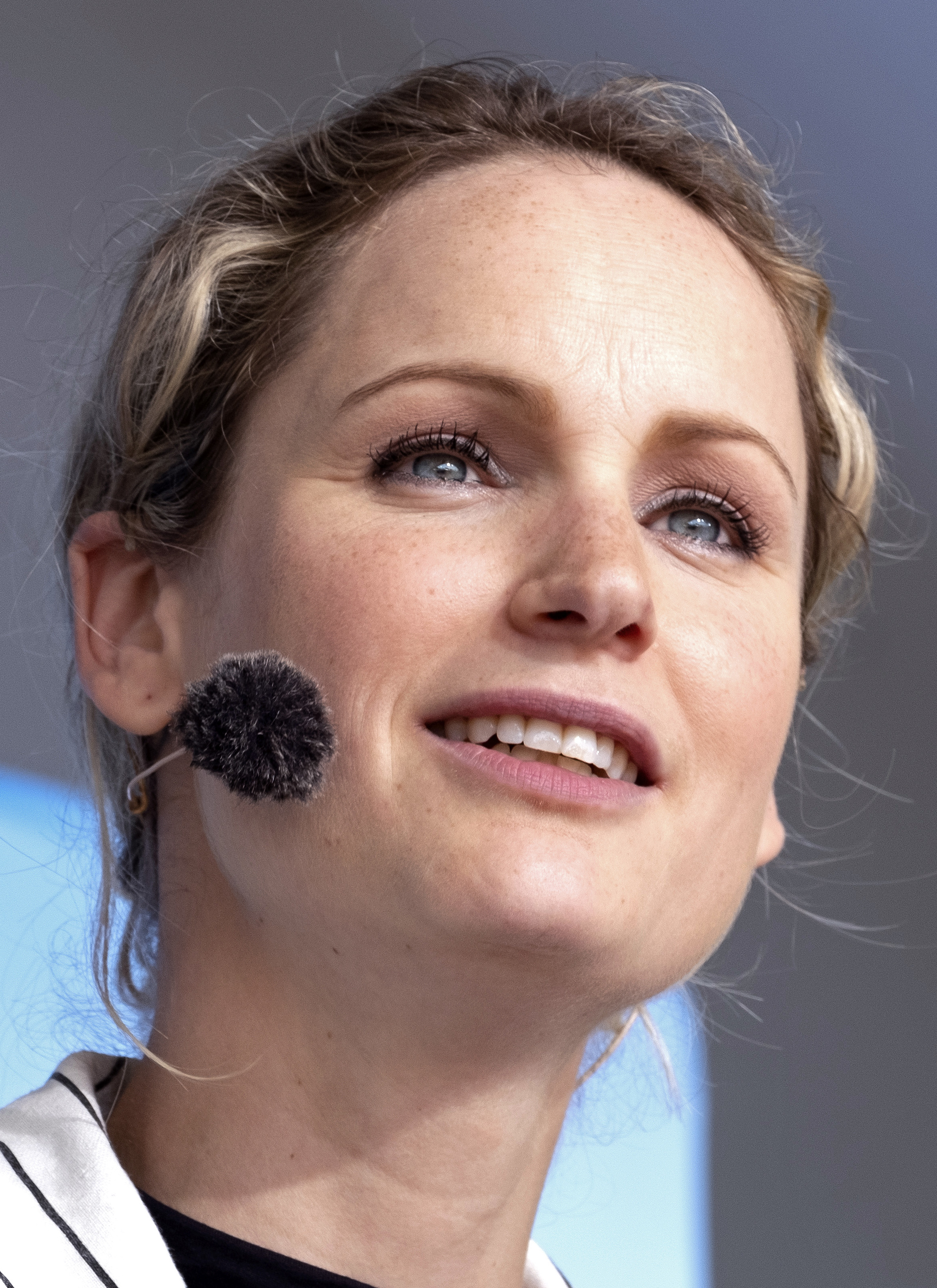

Political spokesperson of the Red–Green Alliance
- In office 4 May 2016 – 10 February 2021
- Preceded by: Johanne Schmidt-Nielsen
- Succeeded by: Mai Villadsen

Member of the Folketing
- In office 15 September 2011 – 10 February 2021
- Constituency: Copenhagen (from 2019); Fyn (2011—2019)

Personal details
- Born: 10 July 1984 (age 42) Aalborg, Denmark
- Party: Red–Green Alliance
- Spouse(s): Oliver Routhe Skov (m. 2015)
- Education: University of Copenhagen

Pernille Skipper (born 10 July 1984) is a Danish former politician. She was a member of the Folketing from 2011 to 2022, and was political spokesperson for the far-left eco-socialist Red–Green Alliance from 2016 to 2021, succeeding Johanne Schmidt-Nielsen. In 2021 she was replaced by Mai Villadsen.

Skipper was active in student politics, being chairman of the student council in high school, and vice chairman at the student council at the University of Copenhagen. She has been a member of the Red–Green Alliance since 2001, and was in 2011 elected to the Folketing. Since 2013 she has been seen as the expected successor to Schmidt-Nielsen, and in 2016 she was appointed political spokesperson.

== Background ==
Pernille Skipper was born in Aalborg on 10 July 1984. Her parents are Jørnn Skipper and Henriette von Platen-Hallermund. From 2001 to 2003 she took her secondary education at Aalborghus Gymnasium. During this period, she was involved in student politics, being chairperson of her school's student council, chairperson of the regional chapter of Danske Gymnasieelevers Sammenslutning, the Danish association of gymnasium students, and a member of their national board.

She earned a master's degree in Law in 2011 from the University of Copenhagen. During her studies, she was vice chair of the student council at the University of Copenhagen from 2006 to 2007, and vice chair of the university's educational strategic council from 2006 to 2008. From 2009 to 2011 she had a student job at Hillerød County Court.

== Political career ==
When she was 15, Skipper was briefly a member of Venstres Ungdom. She was a member of Socialist Youth Front, and was part of the leadership from 2004 to 2005. In 2001 she joined the Red–Green Alliance. From 2009 to 2014 she was a member of the Red–Green Alliance's central board and their executive committee.

At the 2011 general election Skipper was elected to the Folketing. Since 2011 she has been vice chair of the party's parliamentary group. On 10 December 2013, in her role as spokesperson for justice, she announced that the Red–Green Alliance no longer trusted the Minister of Justice, Morten Bødskov, leading to his resignation. Prior to this, Bødskov had admitted that he had misinformed Folketing about why a visit to Christiania in 2012 was cancelled. The official explanation was that the Copenhagen police director could not participate, but the real reason was that DSIS warned about a security threat against Pia Kjærsgaard.

In 2012 she matched Johanne Schmidt-Nielsen in an internal ballot, and in 2013 she surpassed her. Starting in 2013, she was named in the media as Schmidt-Nielsen's likely successor as political spokesperson of the Red–Green Alliance. In October 2014, Skipper joined the parliamentary committee that scrutinizes the Danish intelligence agencies.

Prior to the 2015 election, held on 18 June, there was uncertainty as to whether Schmidt-Nielsen could stand for reelection due to the party's "rotation principle", depending on when Prime Minister Helle Thorning-Schmidt announced the election. Skipper was expected to become political spokesperson if Schmidt-Nielsen was not allowed to run, but as the election was announced before the Red–Green Alliance's congress, Schmidt-Nielsen did stand for reelection. In October 2015, Skipper was elected new lead candidate in Copenhagen constituency instead of Schmidt-Nielsen, and in May 2016 she was named political spokesperson for the Red–Green Alliance. Following her appointment, she ended her membership of the Socialist Workers Party, a Trotskyist party which is a part of the Red–Green Alliance.

== Personal life ==
Skipper lives in Vesterbro. Since 2013 she has been in a relationship with Oliver Routhe Skov, who works as a journalist at DR. They married in 2015. They have a daughter, who was born on 25 October 2017.
