= Popular Socialist Youth of Denmark =

Popular Socialist Youth of Denmark Socialistisk Folkepartis Ungdom
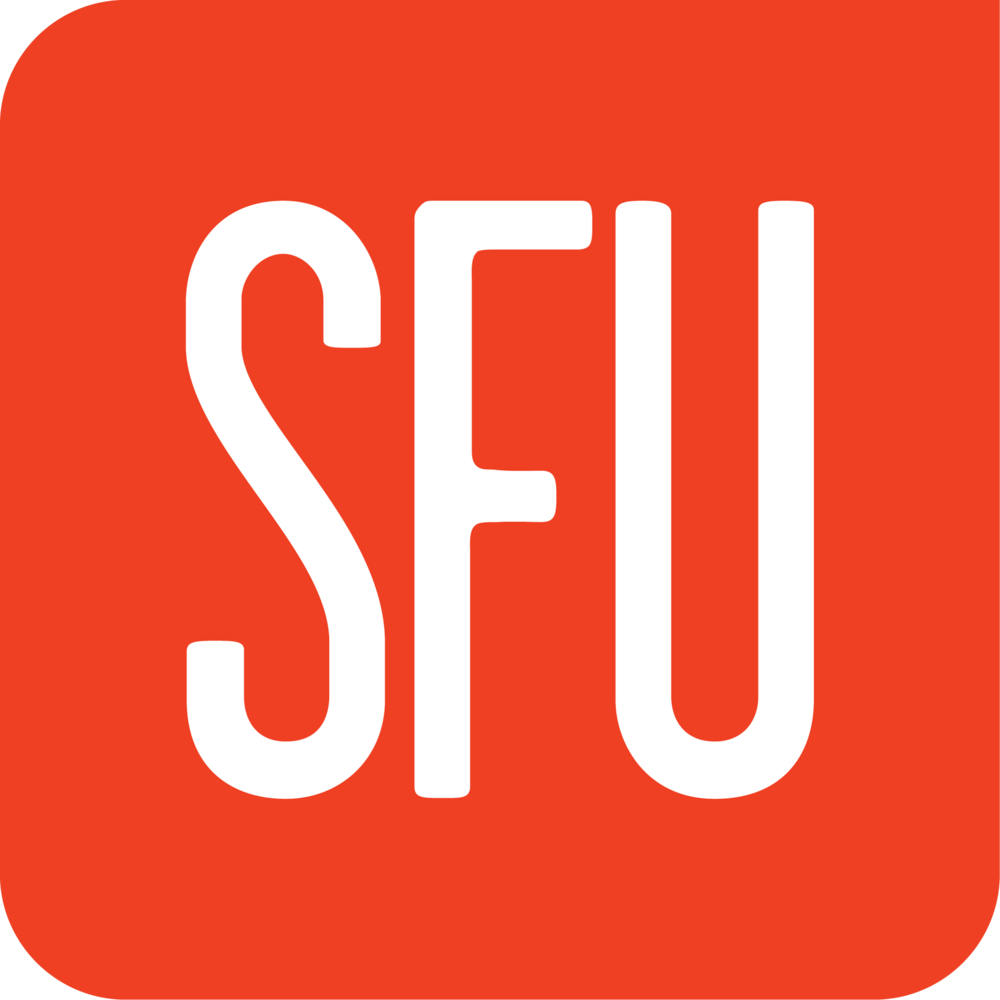
- Political Director: Jesper Dyhrberg
- Finance Director: Elias J. Binggeli
- Membership Director: David Dam Jensen
- Founded: 1969
- Headquarters: Blegdamsvej 24A, 2200 Copenhagen N
- Membership: 1,272 (2021)
- Ideology: Socialism; Popular socialism (Nordic countries); Marxism
- Mother party: Socialist People's Party
- Nordic affiliation: Socialistisk Ungdom i Norden (SUN)
- Magazine: Aktivisten
- Website: sfu.dk

Socialistisk Folkepartis Ungdom (Popular Socialist Youth of Denmark) is the youth wing of the Green Left of Denmark, founded in 1969.

In 1995, the leftist section of the SFU (essentially the Copenhagen branch) broke away and formed Independent Young Socialists (UUS), which evolved into the Socialist Youth Front.

In 2021 SFU consisted of 1,272 members.

In their manifesto they describe themselves as using certain "Marxist tools" in their analysis of the world.

== See also ==
- Independent Young Socialists
- Socialist Youth Front
