= Independent Young Socialists =

Independent Young Socialists (Danish: Uafhængige Unge Socialister or UUS) was a leftist youth group in Denmark.

The UUS was formed in 1995, when the left wing (essentially the Copenhagen branch) of the Youth of the Socialist People's Party (Danish: Socialistisk Folkepartis Ungdom or SFU) broke away.

After the group was virtually disintegrated it merged, in 1996, into the Danish group Rebel.
