= Pelle Dragsted =

Danish politician (born 1975)

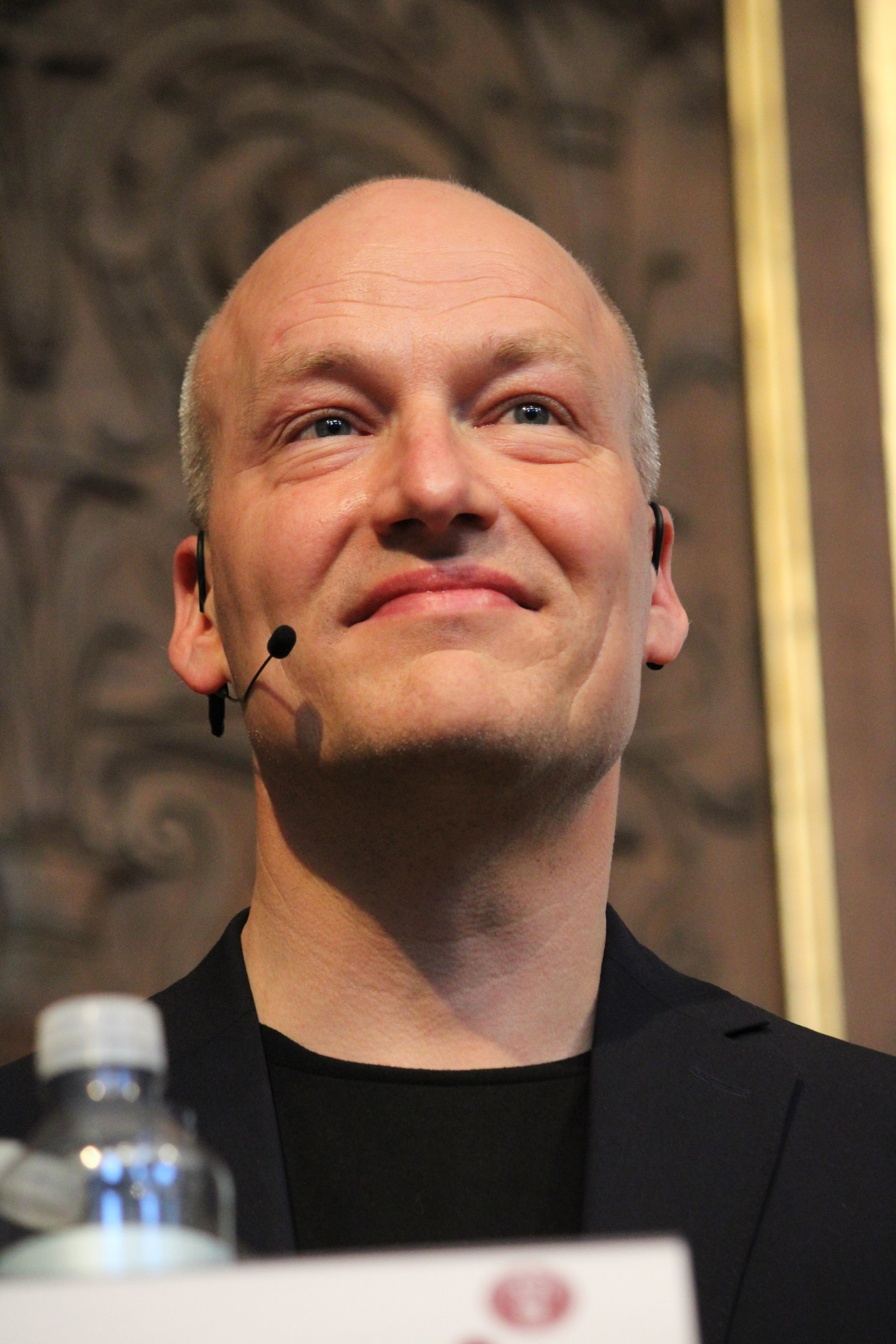
- Dragsted in 2026

Political spokesperson of the Red–Green Alliance
- Incumbent
- Assumed office 22 August 2023
- Preceded by: Mai Villadsen

Member of the Folketing
- Incumbent
- Assumed office 1 November 2022
- Constituency: Copenhagen
- In office 18 June 2015 – 5 June 2019

Personal details
- Born: 13 April 1975 (age 51) Copenhagen, Denmark
- Party: Red–Green Alliance

Pelle Dragsted (born 13 April 1975) is a Danish author and politician who has been a member of the Folketing for the left-wing Red–Green Alliance since the 2022 Danish general election. He formerly served as member of the Folketing in 2015 to 2019. He has been the political spokesperson of the Red–Green Alliance since 2023, succeeding Mai Villadsen. Politically a Marxist and democratic socialist, he has been described as the Danish left's unofficial chief ideologue and as the Red-Green Alliance's grey eminence.

== Career ==
From 2009 to 2011, Dragsted was in charge of the press work for the Red–Green Alliance. From 2011 to 2015 he was a political advisor for the party. Dragsted was first elected to parliament at the 2015 Danish general election, where he received 2,599 votes. He was a state accountant in 2021. In 2021, Dragsted published the book Nordisk socialism (Nordic Socialism: The Path Toward a Democratic Economy), for which he was awarded the N.F.S. Grundtvig Prize. He was elected to the Frederiksberg City Council in 2021, where he served as chair of the climate and housing committee.

Dragsted was again elected to the Folketing in 2022, receiving 14,129 votes. After winning re-election to the Folketing, he stepped back from his position as councillor due to rules regarding double mandates in the Red-Green alliance. In the days following the election, Dragsted participated in government formation negotiations with Mette Frederiksen alongside Mai Villadsen and Peder Hvelplund. On 15 November 2022, he officially became part of the Red–Green alliance's collective leadership. Upon his appointment as political spokesperson of the Red–Green Alliance in 2023, Dragsted was hailed as "capable, visionary and committed" as he put forward a revitalised party manifesto.

== Works ==
- Nordisk socialisme (in Danish). Gyldendal. 2021. ISBN 978-8-70229-485-9.
- Nordic Socialism: The Path Toward a Democratic Economy. Translated by William Banks. University of Wisconsin Press. 2025. ISBN 978-0-2993-5360-5.
