= Johanne Schmidt-Nielsen =

Danish politician

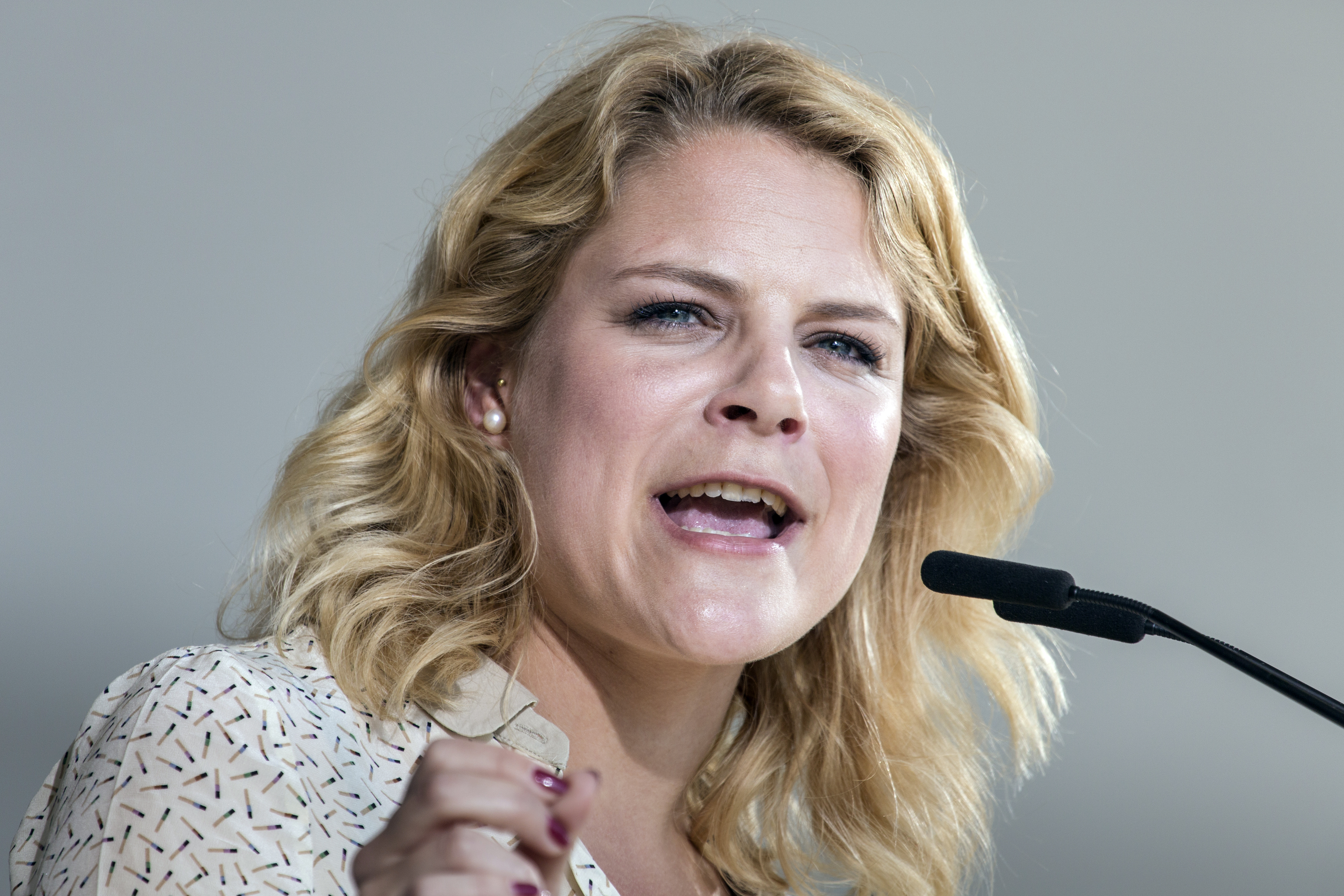

Secretary general for Save the Children Denmark
- Incumbent
- Assumed office 25 April 2019

Political spokesperson for the Red–Green Alliance
- In office 20 March 2009 – 4 May 2016
- Preceded by: Position established
- Succeeded by: Pernille Skipper

Member of the Folketing
- In office 13 November 2007 – 5 June 2019
- Constituency: Nørrebro

Personal details
- Born: 22 February 1984 (age 42) Odense, Denmark
- Education: Roskilde University
- Website: Official website

Johanne Schmidt-Nielsen (born 22 February 1984 in Odense) is a former member of the Danish parliament for the Red-Green Alliance. Schmidt-Nielsen has been referred to as the "new queen of the Red-Green Alliance" by parts of the press. She now serves as secretary general for Save the Children.

Schmidt-Nielsen grew up on Fyn and currently lives in Nørrebro in Copenhagen. She has been active in politics since 1997, and she was vice chairman of the national interest group for students at the Danish gymnasiums from 2002 to 2003. At the Red-Green Alliance's annual meeting in May 2006, she was elected into the executive committee of the party with 147 votes — receiving more votes than any other candidate. She was reelected in 2007.

She holds a bachelor's degree in social science from Roskilde University 2007.

== Political career ==
=== Activism ===
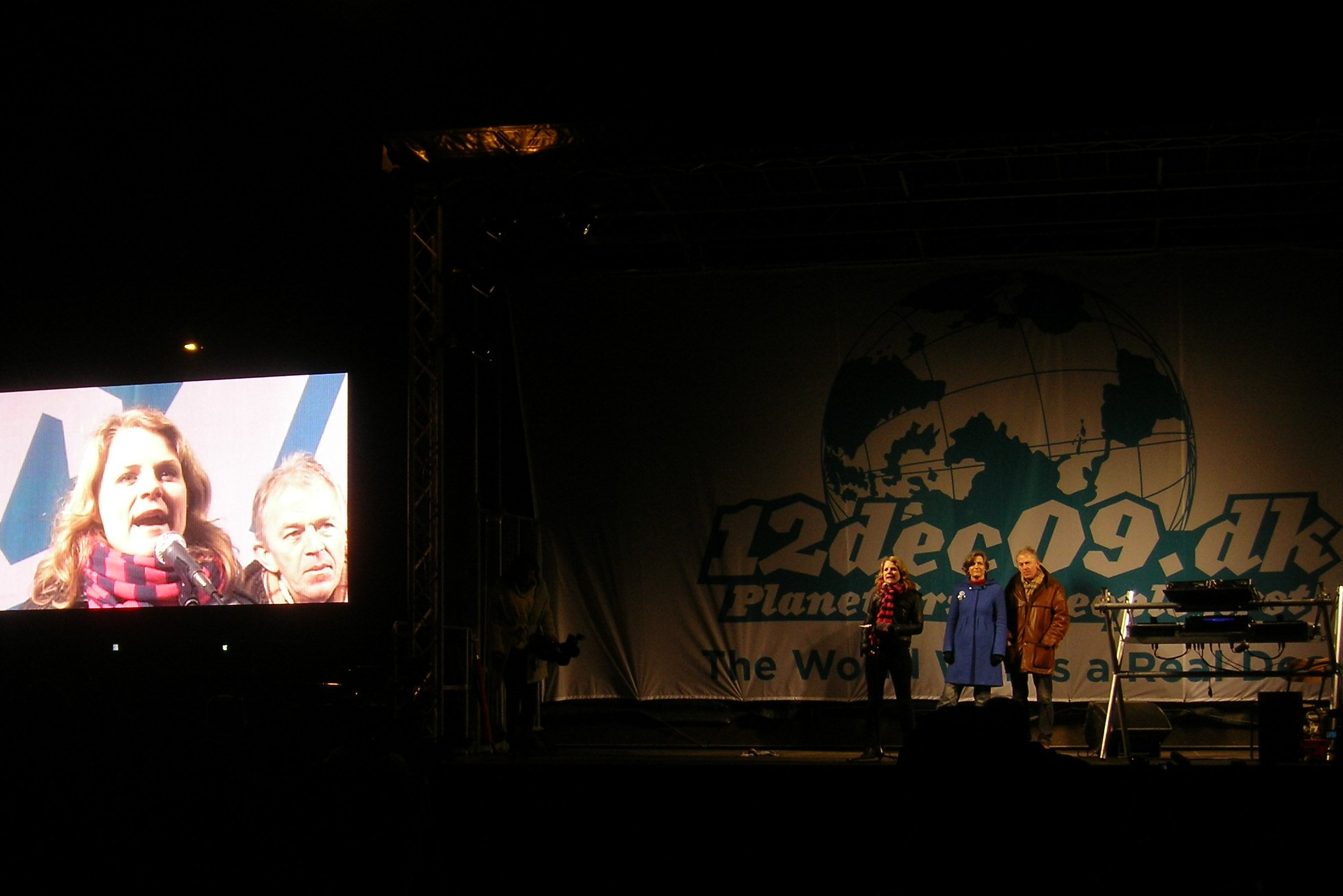
Johanne Schmidt-Nielsen speaking outside COP15 on 12 December 2009

Schmidt-Nielsen has made herself noted as a political activist, and has participated in demonstrations at summits in Prague, Brussels, Gothenburg and Rostock.

As spokesperson for the activist group Velfærdsmissionen (English: The Welfare Mission) she participated in dumping 200 kg of pasta and 40 liters of ketchup on the staircase leading to the Ministry of Finance in a protest against cutbacks in the State education grants.

In March 2007, Schmidt-Nielsen reported the Aller Press owned pornographic magazine, Super, to the police for its use in procuring prostitutes. The background of the report was an article in the tabloid newspaper B.T. on the magazine's monthly contest in which the prize was a half hour in the company of a prostitute. The report was later withdrawn when Aller called the contest off.

On 30 October 2007, Schmidt-Nielsen and fellow feminists hung red stockings on a clothesline at the entry to the Ministry of Social Welfare, with the stated intention of encouraging minister Karen Jespersen to more actively attempt to solve gender equality issues.

The following day, a group of members of the Red-Green Alliance including Schmidt-Nielsen planted bushes in the park Ørstedsparken in central Copenhagen as a symbolic protest against harassment of the male gay population in Copenhagen and as a manifestation of sexual liberal-mindedness. Previously, plantation had been removed from the park to discourage people from having sex in the park. The party also launched an initiative against hate-crimes.

On 5 November 2007, Johanne Schmidt-Nielsen launched a proposal for "modernizing" copyright, which included appointing a commission to redesign the copyright law to allow distributing copyrighted material and to compensate artists for the resulting loss of income. The proposal received significant attention from the media, when she simultaneously confessed to having illegally downloaded and distributed music illegally on the internet and stated that she had no intention to cease doing so.

=== Elections ===
Schmidt-Nielsen ran for the municipal council of Copenhagen Municipality in the 2005 elections, but was not elected.

When in March 2007, Pernille Rosenkrantz-Theil announced that she would not run for re-election to the Folketing, Schmidt-Nielsen took over her position as the party's top candidate in the metropolitan constituency. At the 2007 parliamentary election, she stood for election on issues such as increased social welfare and a struggle against discrimination.

On 12 November 2007, Schmidt-Nielsen participated in a debate for party leaders on TV 2 on the evening before the election as the youngest candidate ever to participate in a nationally televised debate for Danish party leaders. Prior to the debate, the leader of the Conservative People's Party, Bendt Bendtsen, mistook her for an office girl and asked her to fetch him coffee.

She was elected on 8,964 personal votes. In 2011 she was reelected on 47,002 votes, about 15,000 more votes than prime minister Helle Thorning-Schmidt. In 2015 her reelection was secured with 40,225 votes.
