= Mai Villadsen =

Danish politician (born 1991)

Mai Villadsen MP
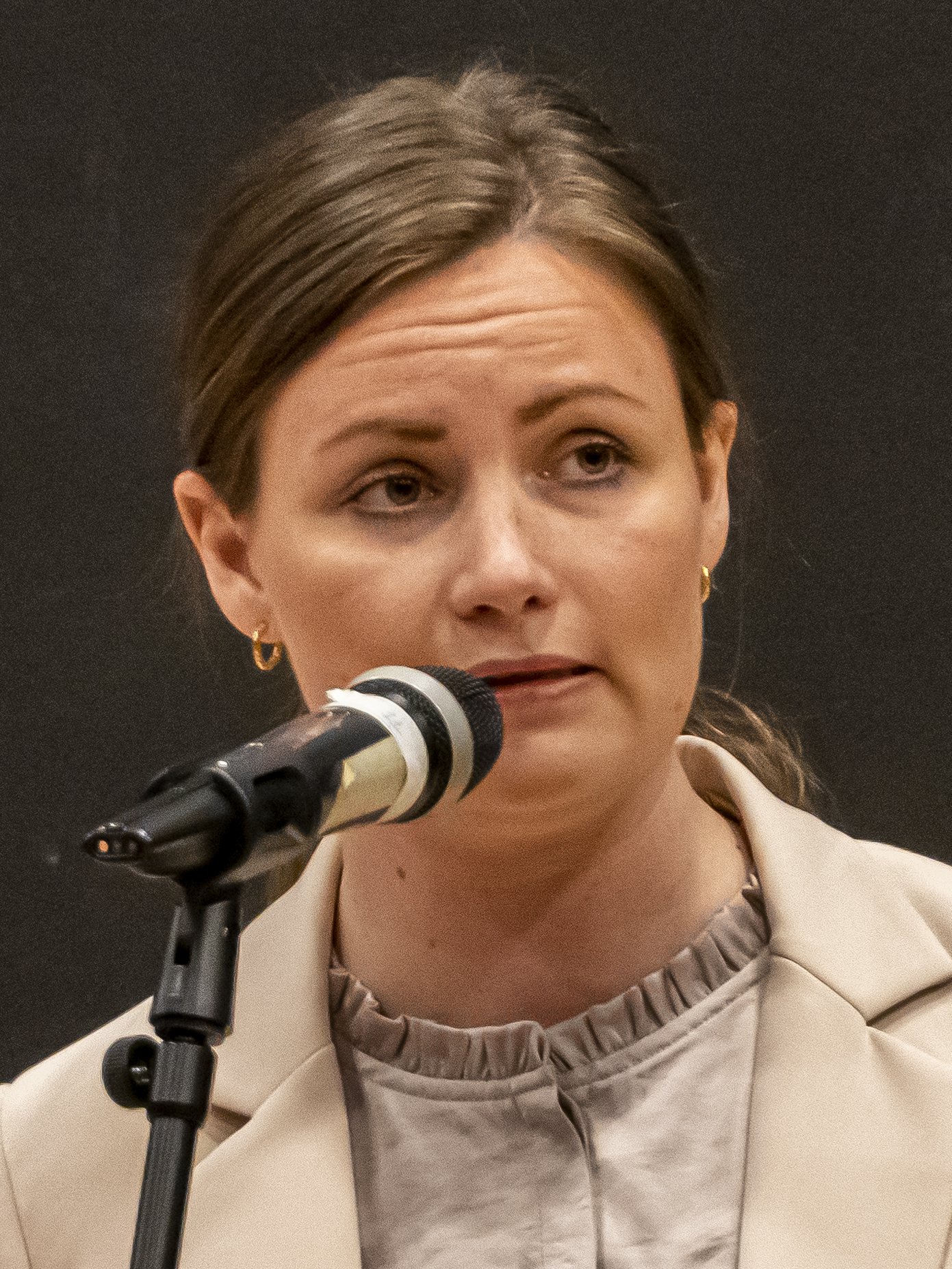
- Villadsen in 2022

Political spokesperson of the Red–Green Alliance
- In office 10 February 2021 – 22 August 2023
- Preceded by: Pernille Skipper
- Succeeded by: Pelle Dragsted

Member of the Folketing
- Incumbent
- Assumed office 5 June 2019
- Constituency: North Zealand

Personal details
- Born: 21 December 1991 (age 34) Kibæk, Denmark
- Party: Red–Green Alliance
- Education: Gefion Gymnasium

Mai Villadsen (born 26 December 1991) is a Danish politician who is a member of the Folketing since the 2019 Danish general election.

Villadsen served as the political spokesperson of the Red–Green Alliance from 2021 until 2023. She was succeeded in this role by Pelle Dragsted.

== Early life ==
Villadsen grew up in the town of Kibæk, which is one of the places in Denmark where the Red–Green Alliance has the lowest voter turnout. She is the daughter of primary school teachers Jørn Sloth Andersen and Lisbeth Ejby Villadsen. Villadsen has mentioned her grandmother, who was a seamstress and active in trade union life, as her inspiration to enter politics.

Villadsen attended Kibæk School from 1997 until 2007 and became a student at Gefion Gymnasium in 2011, but without subsequently completing a higher education.

== Career ==
From 2013 until 2015, Villadsen was employed as a youth consultant in the trade union HK Denmark, where she worked in organising young people in the professional community and advised members in connection with dismissals.

From 2015 until 2019, she was a political adviser in the Red–Green Alliance. Around the same time, she worked as an external lecturer at think tank CEVEA, and in the period 2015 until 2017 as an external project manager and lecturer at DeltagerDanmark. The work consisted, among other things, of training young professional activists in debate and organisation.

Villadsen was elected into parliament at the 2019 election, where she received 2,572 votes. On 10 February 2021, she became the new political spokesperson for the Red–Green Alliance, after Pernille Skipper. Despite the Red-Green Alliance losing four seats at the 2022 Danish general election, Villadsen was re-elected receiving 10,822 personal votes.

On 22 August 2023, Villadsen left office as the political spokesperson of the Red-Green Alliance. Her replacement Pelle Dragsted was hailed as ‘capable, visionary and committed’ as he put forward a revitalised party manifesto.
