= Rebel (Denmark) =

Former Danish far-left youth organization

Logo of REBEL

REBEL - Revolutionære Unge Socialister (Revolutionary Young Socialists) was an independent Danish far-left youth organisation founded in 1992. In 2001, REBEL joined forces with the youth network of the Red-Green Alliance / Enhedslisten and established Socialist Youth Front.
