= Nordkraft (Aalborg) =

Coordinates: 57°02′47″N 9°55′58″E

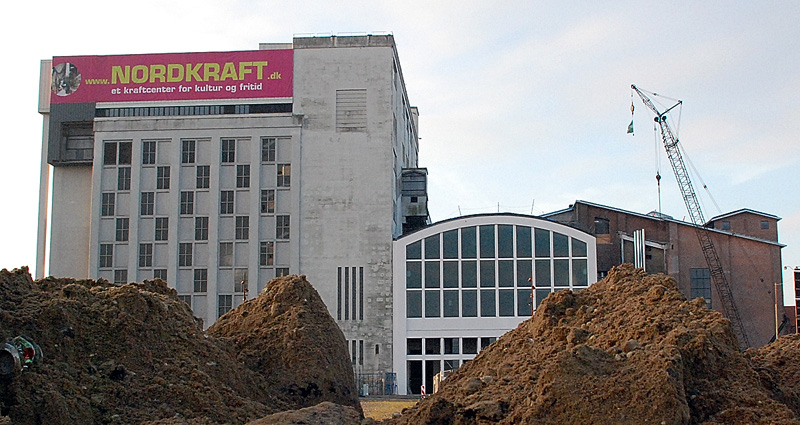
The Nordcraft cultural centre

Nordkraft is a cultural centre in the Danish city of Aalborg. Opened in 2009, it is located in a former electricity generating station close to the waterfront in an area designated for cultural development. Neighbouring buildings include the Utzon Center and Musikkens Hus. Nordkraft is home to several cultural institutions including Skråen, a venue for jazz and rock concerts, Teater Nordkraft, the Biffen Art Cinema, the Kunsthal Nord art gallery and Dreamhouse, an innovative creation facility. It also has a multipurpose hall with seating for up to 1,500.
