= 2022 Danish general election =

- 1 November 2022; 31 October (Faroe Islands only)
- All 179 seats in the Folketing; 175 from Denmark, 2 from Greenland and 2 from the Faroe Islands; 90 seats needed for a majority
- Turnout: 84.16% (▼0.44pp)
Party	Leader	Vote %	Seats	+/–
Parties in Denmark
Social Democrats	Mette Frederiksen	27.54	50	+2
Venstre	Jakob Ellemann-Jensen	13.31	23	−20
Moderates	Lars Løkke Rasmussen	9.27	16	New
Green Left	Pia Olsen Dyhr	8.29	15	+1
Denmark Democrats	Inger Støjberg	8.08	14	New
Liberal Alliance	Alex Vanopslagh	7.87	14	+10
Conservatives	Søren Pape Poulsen	5.51	10	−2
Red–Green	Mai Villadsen (Note: Formally, the Red–Green Alliance has collective leadership, but as its political spokesperson, Villadsen was the de facto leader of the party.)	5.16	9	−4
Social Liberals	Sofie Carsten Nielsen	3.79	7	−9
New Right	Pernille Vermund	3.66	6	+2
The Alternative	Franciska Rosenkilde	3.33	6	+1
DPP	Morten Messerschmidt	2.63	5	−11
Parties in the Faroe Islands
Union	Bárður á Steig Nielsen	30.19	1	0
Social Democratic	Aksel V. Johannesen	28.20	1	0
Parties in Greenland
Siumut	Erik Jensen	38.58	1	0
Inuit Ataqatigiit	Múte Bourup Egede	25.21	1	0
This lists parties that won seats. See the complete results below.

Government before	Government after election
Frederiksen I Social Democrats	Frederiksen II; S–V–M

General elections were held in the Kingdom of Denmark on 1 November 2022 – except in the Faroe Islands, where they were held on 31 October, for 1 November was a national day of mourning for victims at sea. Of the 179 members of the Folketing, 175 were elected in Denmark proper, two in the Faroes and two in Greenland. The elections were called on 5 October following an ultimatum to the government by the Social Liberals (which had been providing external support) due to the outcome of a report on the 2020 Danish mink cull by the Mink Commission, which was critical of the government. Voter turnout was 84% in Denmark, 48% in Greenland, and 71% in the Faroes, with a combined turnout of 84% for the realm as a whole.

Initially it appeared that no bloc would gain a majority; however, left-leaning parties retained their majority due to results in the Faroe Islands and Greenland, but with the majority reduced to a single seat. The governing Social Democrats achieved their best result in 20 years, with 28% of the vote, while the Social Liberals experienced one of their worst ever results. Leading opposition party Venstre also suffered major losses in the elections, losing more than 40% of its seats. Two new parties standing in the elections, the Moderates and the Denmark Democrats, won 16 and 14 seats respectively, making them the third- and fifth-largest parties.

The blue bloc and the Moderates together received more votes than the red bloc, but the red bloc won a majority of seats due to the two Greenlandic seats and the Social Democrats winning one more constituency seat than it was entitled to seats overall. Following the elections, Frederiksen was appointed informateur and, despite the left bloc holding a majority of seats, opted to form a centrist government with Venstre and other parties from the blue bloc, which had also been her pledge during the campaign. After negotiations, a coalition government composed of the Social Democrats, Venstre and the Moderates was formed, the first time since 1977 where both main parties were part of a coalition government.

== Background ==
The 2019 Danish general election on 5 June ended with a 91-seat win for the Social Democrats and Mette Frederiksen and their supporting parties. Twenty-two days later, a minority government was formed by the Social Democrats. The government was supported by the other parties in the red bloc (the Social Liberals, the Green Left, and the Red–Green Alliance). Frederiksen, the leader of the Social Democrats, became Prime Minister of Denmark.

On 2 July 2022 Sofie Carsten Nielsen, leader of the Social Liberals, one of supporting parties of the government, encouraged Frederiksen to set an election date before 4 October after the report of the Mink Commission was published, criticising the government's handling of the Cluster 5 outbreak in November 2020. Later the same day, Nielsen announced that she was ready to put forward a motion of no confidence if the prime minister refused to call early elections.

On 5 October, Frederiksen announced that general elections were to be held on 1 November, the first to be held on a Tuesday since the 2007 Danish general election.

== Electoral system ==
The 179 members of the Folketing are elected in Denmark (175), the Faroe Islands (2) and Greenland (2). The 175 seats in Denmark include 135 seats elected in ten multi-member constituencies of Denmark by proportional representation, using the d'Hondt method (kredsmandater), and 40 leveling seats, allocated to parties in order to address any imbalance in the distribution of the constituency seats (tillægsmandater). The main threshold for levelling seats is 2%.

According to the Constitution of Denmark, the election had to be held no later than 4 June 2023, as the last election was held on 5 June 2019. The incumbent prime minister is able to call the election at any date, provided that date is no later than four years from the previous election, and this is often cited as a tactical advantage to the sitting government, as it can call an early election when opinion polls are favourable. Lars Løkke Rasmussen, the previous prime minister from 2015 to 2019, announced on 7 May 2019 that elections would be held on 5 June; the latest date for that election was 17 June.

In order for a new party to be eligible to run in the election it must obtain declarations of support (vælgererklæringer) from a number of electors at least equal to 1/175th of the total valid votes cast at the previous elections. For the 2022 election, this figure was equal to 20,182 declarations of support. Four new parties (Moderates, Denmark Democrats, Independent Greens and Vegan Party managed to raise this amount thus becoming eligible for the election although the Vegan Party choose not to use its eligibility but instead merge with the Alternatives. A minimum of 1,112 votes were not counted due to them not being delivered in time. These did not contribute to the voter turnout and were in all likelihood irrelevant to the resultant according to political scientist Kasper Møller Hansen.

Despite the blue bloc and the Moderates combined gaining 68,209 more votes than the combined red bloc, the red bloc still managed to secure a slight majority of 90 seats. Apart from three out of four North Atlantic seats going to red parties, red bloc's success was due to a never previously used section in the election law (section 77, subsection 3) that secured the Social Democrats an additional seat that would otherwise have been awarded to Venstre.

Constituency	Seats
Bornholm	2
Copenhagen	17
East Jutland	18
Faroe Islands	2
Funen	12
Greater Copenhagen	11
Greenland	2
North Jutland	15
North Zealand	10
South Jutland	17
West Jutland	13
Zealand	20

=== Voter eligibility ===
One has the right to vote if one is 18 years old on election day, is a Danish citizen, lives within the Realm (Denmark proper, Greenland and the Faroe Islands) and are not disempowered (umyndiggjort). Disempowerment is for instance mental disabilities. All eligible voters are also eligible to run for election. After the election, all newly elected members of the Folketing must sign a declaration stating that they intend to comply with the Constitution, while the new Folketing must approve the election and the eligibility of the individual members. This is done in the Committee for Electoral Trials (Udvalget til Valgs Prøvelse). After the 2022 election all elected members of the Folketing were approved.

== Issues ==
In her speech announcing the election, Frederiksen declared the election to be a security election (Danish: tryghedsvalg), citing issues such as the 2022 Russian invasion of Ukraine, economic anxiety, and issues in the health system. In the same speech, Frederiksen also declared her intentions to work towards a centrist government with parties from both blocs rather than continue the incumbent one-party minority government.

Two of the parties supporting the Frederiksen Cabinet, the Red–Green Alliance and the Green Left, both came out in opposition to a centrist government, citing concerns of undue conservative influence. The blue bloc, including Liberal Alliance, the Conservative People's Party, Venstre, the Denmark Democrats, New Right, and the Danish People's Party, also denied the possibility of a government with the Social Democrats. The Social Liberals and especially the Moderates, who have been campaigning for a centrist government since their inception, supported Frederiksen's declaration.

== Political parties ==
The table below lists parties represented in the Folketing.

=== Denmark ===
Name		Ideologies	Leader	2019 result		Seats at dissolution
Name		Ideologies	Leader	Votes (%)	Seats	Seats at dissolution
A	Social Democrats; Socialdemokratiet	Social democracy	Mette Frederiksen	25.9%	48 / 179	49 / 179
V	Venstre; Venstre, Danmarks Liberale Parti	Conservative liberalism Agrarianism (Nordic)	Jakob Ellemann-Jensen	23.4%	43 / 179	39 / 179
O	Danish People's Party; Dansk Folkeparti	Danish nationalism National conservatism Anti-immigration	Morten Messerschmidt	8.7%	16 / 179	6 / 179
B	Social Liberals; Det Radikale Venstre	Social liberalism	Sofie Carsten Nielsen	8.6%	16 / 179	14 / 179
F	Green Left; Socialistisk Folkeparti	Green politics Popular socialism	Pia Olsen Dyhr	7.7%	14 / 179	15 / 179
Ø	Red–Green Alliance; Enhedslisten – De Rød-Grønne	Eco-socialism; Anti-capitalism	Collective leadership Political leader: Mai Villadsen	6.9%	13 / 179	13 / 179
C	Conservative People's Party; Det Konservative Folkeparti	Green conservatism Liberal conservatism	Søren Pape Poulsen	6.6%	12 / 179	13 / 179
Å	The Alternative; Alternativet	Green politics Pro-Europeanism	Franciska Rosenkilde	3.0%	5 / 179	2 / 179
D	New Right; Nye Borgerlige	National conservatism Economic liberalism Anti-immigration	Pernille Vermund	2.4%	4 / 179	4 / 179
I	Liberal Alliance; Liberal Alliance	Right-libertarianism; Classical liberalism	Alex Vanopslagh	2.3%	4 / 179	3 / 179
Æ	Denmark Democrats; Danmarksdemokraterne	Right-wing populism Anti-immigration	Inger Støjberg			8 / 179
Q	Independent Greens; Frie Grønne	Green politics Anti-racism; Minority rights	Sikandar Siddique			2 / 179
K	Christian Democrats; Kristendemokraterne	Christian democracy Social conservatism	Marianne Karlsmose	1.8%	0 / 179	0 / 179
M	Moderates; Moderaterne	Liberalism; Centrism	Lars Løkke Rasmussen			1 / 179
Ind.	Independent			0.1%	0 / 179	6 / 179

=== Faroe Islands ===
Name		Ideologies	Leader	2019 result		Seats at dissolution
Name		Ideologies	Leader	Votes (%)	Seats	Seats at dissolution
JF	Social Democratic Party; Javnaðarflokkurin	Social democracy	Aksel V. Johannesen	24.3%	1 / 179	1 / 179
SP	Union Party; Sambandsflokkurin	Conservative liberalism	Bárður á Steig Nielsen	23.5%	1 / 179	1 / 179

=== Greenland ===
Name		Ideologies	Leader	2019 result		Seats at dissolution
Name		Ideologies	Leader	Votes (%)	Seats	Seats at dissolution
IA	Community of the People; Inuit Ataqatigiit	Democratic socialism	Múte Bourup Egede	38.3%	1 / 179	1 / 179
SIU	Forward; Siumut	Social democracy	Erik Jensen	38.0%	1 / 179	1 / 179

== Debates ==
2022 Danish general election debates
Date	Time	Organizers	Venue	P Present I Invitee N Non-invitee S Surrogate														
Date	Time	Organizers	Venue	A	B	C	D	F	I	K	M	O	Q	V	Æ	Ø	Å	Refs
4 Sep	21:00	DR	DR Byen	P Frederiksen	N	P Pape	N	N	N	N	N	N	N	P Ellemann	N	N	N	
21 Sep	19:55	TV 2	Copenhagen	S Bruus	P Nielsen	P Pape	P Vermund	P Dyhr	P Vanopslagh	N	N	N	N	P Ellemann	N	P Villadsen	N	
27 Sep	16:00	DI	Royal Arena	N	P Nielsen	N	N	N	N	N	P Løkke	N	N	N	P Støjberg	N	N	
29 Sep	10:00	ÆS	Odense	P Frederiksen	P Nielsen	P Pape	P Vermund	P Dyhr	P Vanopslagh	N	P Løkke	P Messerschmidt	N	P Ellemann	S Skaarup	P Villadsen	N	
4 Oct	20:30	DR2	DR Byen	S Wammen	P Nielsen	P Pape	P Vermund	P Dyhr	P Vanopslagh	P Karlsmose	P Løkke	P Messerschmidt	P Siddique	P Ellemann	P Støjberg	P Villadsen	P Rosenkilde	
5 Oct	20:00	DR and TV 2	Christiansborg	P Frederiksen	P Nielsen	P Pape	P Vermund	P Dyhr	P Vanopslagh	P Karlsmose	P Løkke	P Messerschmidt	P Siddique	P Ellemann	P Støjberg	P Villadsen	P Rosenkilde	
9 Oct	20:00	TV 2	Storms Pakhus, Odense	P Frederiksen	N	P Pape	N	N	N	N	N	N	N	P Ellemann	N	N	N	
12 Oct	15:00	DI	AAK, Aarhus	S Wammen	P Nielsen	P Pape	P Vermund	P Dyhr	N	N	P Løkke	N	N	P Ellemann	P Støjberg	N	N	
13 Oct	16:00	TV 2	Rybners Gymnasium, Esbjerg	S Tesfaye	P Nielsen	P Pape	P Vermund	P Dyhr	P Vanopslagh	P Karlsmose	P Løkke	P Messerschmidt	P Siddique	P Ellemann	P Støjberg	P Villadsen	P Rosenkilde	
16 Oct	21:00	DR	Koncerthuset, Copenhagen	P Frederiksen	N	P Pape	N	N	N	N	N	N	N	P Ellemann	N	N	N	
27 Oct	20:00	TV 2	Nordkraft, Aalborg	S Tesfaye	P Nielsen	P Pape	N	N	P Vanopslagh	N	N	N	P Siddique	P Ellemann	P Støjberg	P Villadsen	N	
30 Oct	21:00	DR	Koncerthuset, Copenhagen	P Frederiksen	P Nielsen	P Pape	P Vermund	P Dyhr	P Vanopslagh	P Karlsmose	P Løkke	P Messerschmidt	P Siddique	P Ellemann	P Støjberg	P Villadsen	P Rosenkilde	
31 Oct	20:00	TV 2	Christiansborg, Copenhagen	P Frederiksen	P Nielsen	P Pape	P Vermund	P Dyhr	P Vanopslagh	P Karlsmose	P Løkke	P Messerschmidt	P Siddique	P Ellemann	P Støjberg	P Villadsen	P Rosenkilde	

== Opinion polls ==

=== Exit polls ===
Party	Poll by Epinion			
Party	%	+/–	Seats	+/–
Social Democrats	23.1	-4.6	42	–6
Venstre	13.5	–9.9	24	–19
Moderates	9.3	New	17	New
Green Left	9.6	+1.9	17	+3
Liberal Alliance	9.0	+6.7	16	+12
Denmark Democrats	6.9	New	12	New
Red–Green Alliance	6.2	–0.7	11	–2
Conservatives	5.5	–1.1	10	–2
Social Liberals	4.7	–3.9	8	–8
The Alternative	3.9	+0.9	7	+2
New Right	3.8	+1.4	7	+3
Danish People's Party	2.5	–6.2	4	–12
Independent Greens	1.3	New	0	New
Christian Democrats	0.4	–1.3	0	0

==== Voters demographics ====
Division	A	B	C	D	F	I	K	M	O	Q	V	Æ	Ø	Å	Red	Blue	None
Division	%	%	%	%	%	%	%	%	%	%	%	%	%	%	%	%	%
Males	25.5	3.6	5.2	5.2	5.8	10.8	0.4	9.4	2.9	1.0	13.2	10.2	4.1	2.5	33.1	57.3	9.4
Females	29.5	4.0	5.9	2.1	10.9	4.9	0.6	9.2	2.4	0.8	13.4	5.9	6.3	4.1	55.7	35.2	9.2
Young (18–34)	14.1	6.7	6.2	5.4	9.1	15.0	0.4	10.5	1.0	2.0	10.5	3.6	8.1	5.8	45.8	43.2	10.5

== Results ==

Party	Votes	%	Seats	+/–
Denmark proper
Social Democrats	971,995	27.50	50	+2
Venstre	470,546	13.32	23	–20
Moderates	327,699	9.27	16	New
Green Left	293,186	8.30	15	+1
Denmark Democrats	286,796	8.12	14	New
Liberal Alliance	278,656	7.89	14	+10
Conservative People's Party	194,820	5.51	10	–2
Red–Green Alliance	181,452	5.13	9	–4
Social Liberals	133,931	3.79	7	–9
New Right	129,524	3.67	6	+2
The Alternative	117,567	3.33	6	+1
Danish People's Party	93,428	2.64	5	–11
Independent Greens	31,787	0.90	0	New
Christian Democrats	18,276	0.52	0	0
Independents	4,288	0.12	0	0
Total	3,533,951	100.00	175	0
Valid votes	3,533,951	98.36		
Invalid votes	12,599	0.35		
Blank votes	46,272	1.29		
Total votes	3,592,822	100.00		
Registered voters/turnout	4,269,048	84.16		
Source: DST
Faroe Islands
Union Party	8,198	30.19	1	0
Social Democratic Party	7,659	28.20	1	0
Republic	4,927	18.14	0	0
People's Party	4,222	15.55	0	0
Centre Party	1,217	4.48	0	New
Progress	936	3.45	0	0
Total	27,159	100.00	2	0
Valid votes	27,159	99.20		
Invalid votes	73	0.27		
Blank votes	146	0.53		
Total votes	27,378	100.00		
Registered voters/turnout	38,387	71.32		
Source: kvf.fo
Greenland
Siumut	7,424	38.58	1	0
Inuit Ataqatigiit	4,852	25.21	1	0
Democrats	3,656	19.00	0	0
Naleraq	2,416	12.55	0	0
Atassut	720	3.74	0	0
Cooperation Party	176	0.91	0	0
Total	19,244	100.00	2	0
Valid votes	19,244	97.52		
Invalid votes	197	1.00		
Blank votes	293	1.48		
Total votes	19,734	100.00		
Registered voters/turnout	41,305	47.78		
Source: Qinersineq

=== Seats won by type ===
Party	Seats		
Party	Constituency	Top-up	Total
Social Democrats	50	0	50
Venstre	21	2	23
Moderates	13	3	16
Green Left	12	3	15
Denmark Democrats	11	3	14
Liberal Alliance	10	4	14
Conservative People's Party	7	3	10
Red–Green Alliance	4	5	9
Danish Social Liberal Party	2	5	7
New Right	2	4	6
The Alternative	2	4	6
Danish People's Party	1	4	5
Total	135	40	175
Source: DST

=== Maps ===
Map of the election on the Faroe Islands, showing the largest party in each polling area

Largest party within each polling area.

Largest party within each nomination district and constituency.

== Aftermath and government formation ==
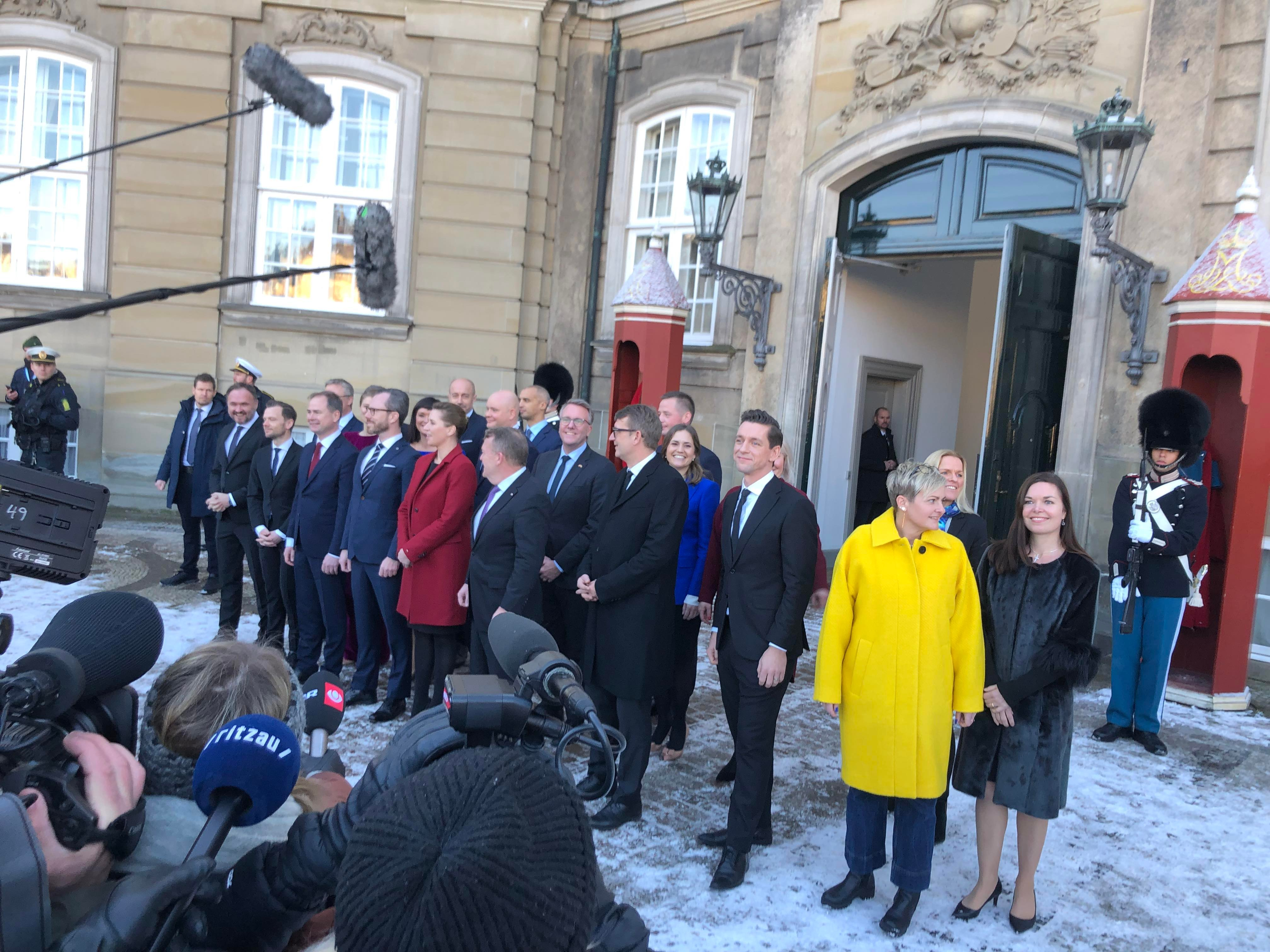
Frederiksen II first public appearance on 15 December 2022 at Amalienborg after having been presented before the Queen. Frederiksen (in red) with Ellemann to her right and Løkke to her left.

The election was simultaneously the best result for the Social Democrats in more than 20 years and the worst result for Venstre in more than 30 years. Mette Frederiksen, the leader of the red bloc and the incumbent prime minister, thanked voters for giving the red bloc a majority; despite winning a slim majority of one seat, she decided to follow her campaign promise and resign in order to seek a new centrist government with parties from both sides of the political spectrum. Following the results, she was congratulated by the prime ministers of Norway and Spain, Jonas Gahr Støre and Pedro Sánchez, both members of her same European political group, the Party of European Socialists.

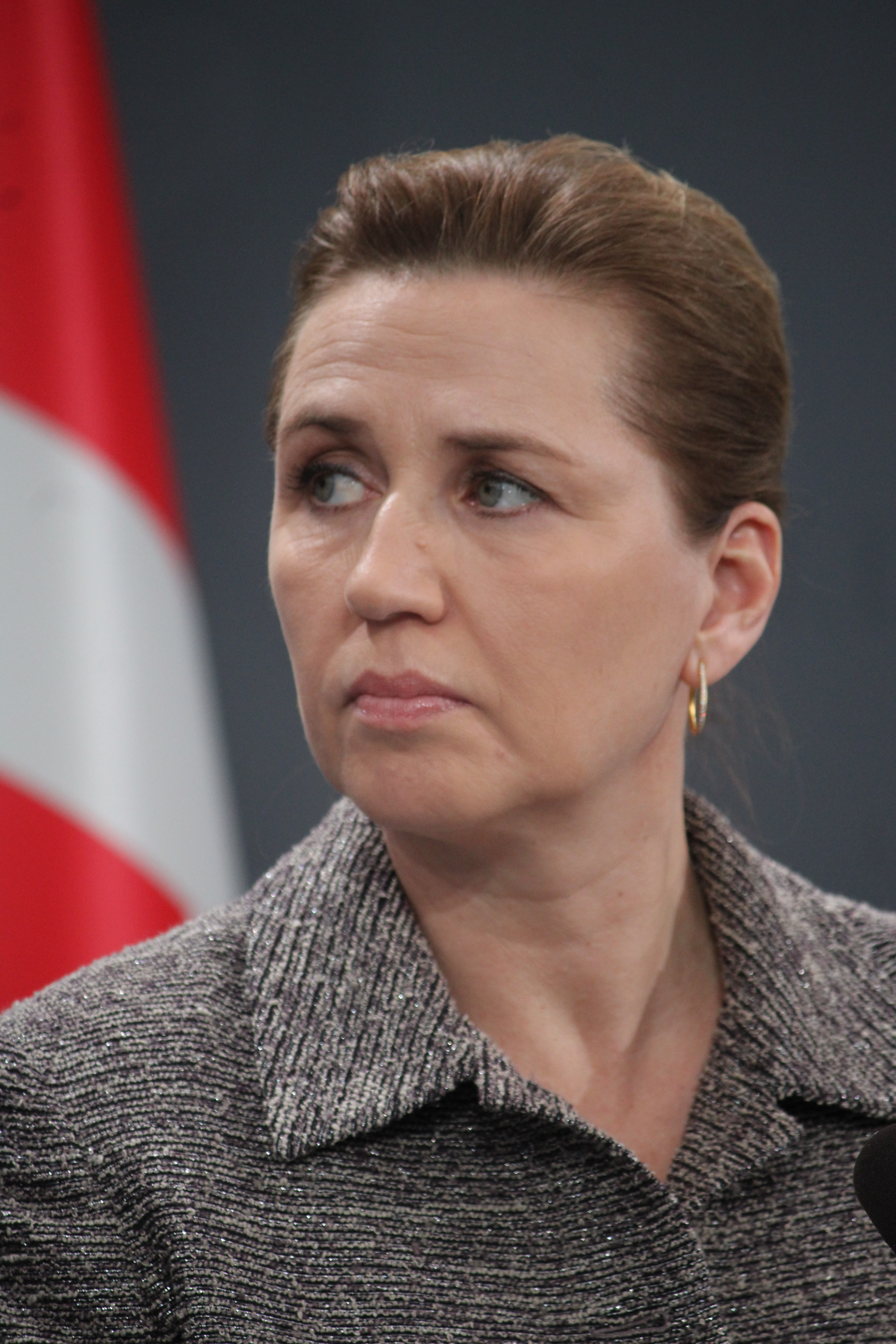
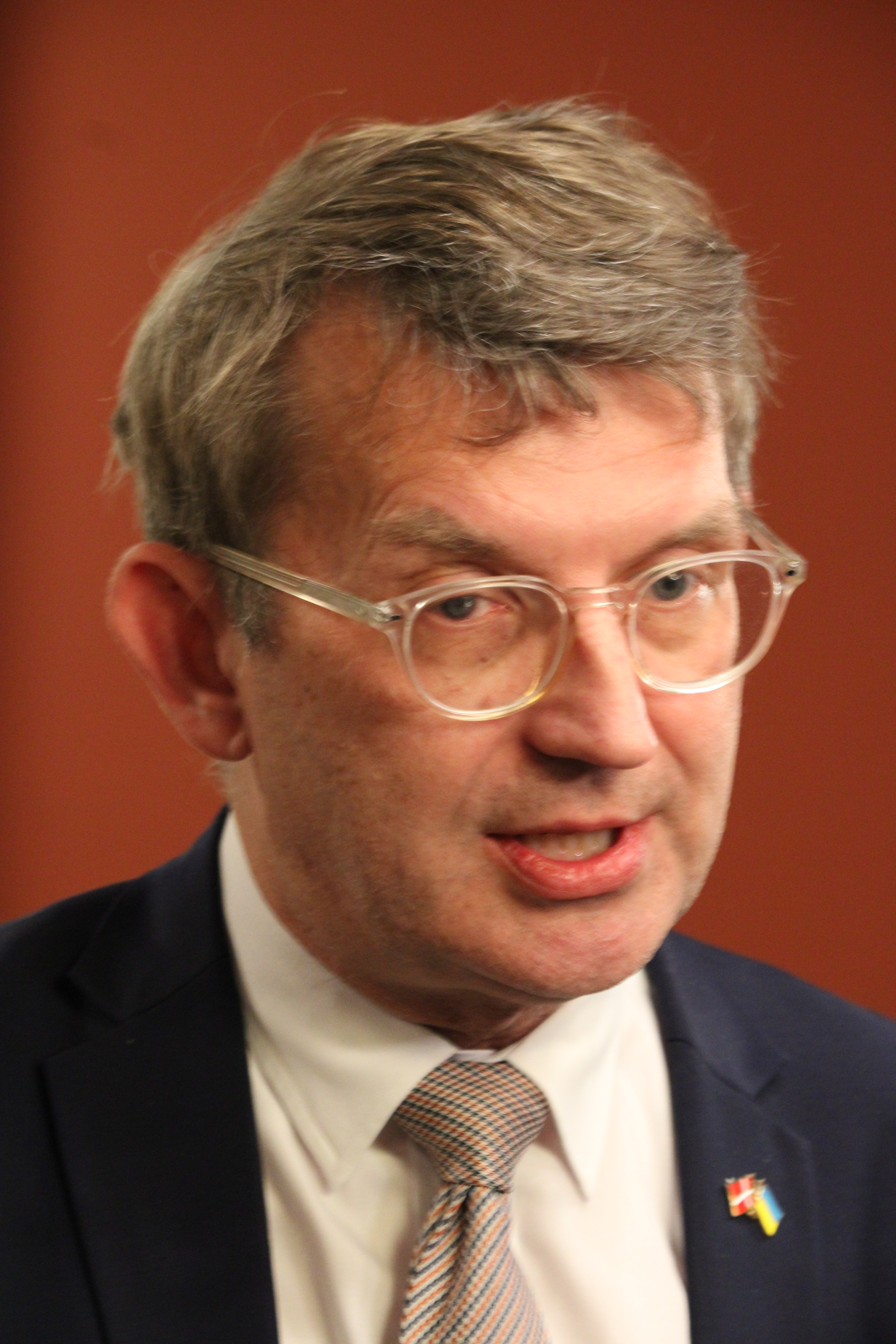
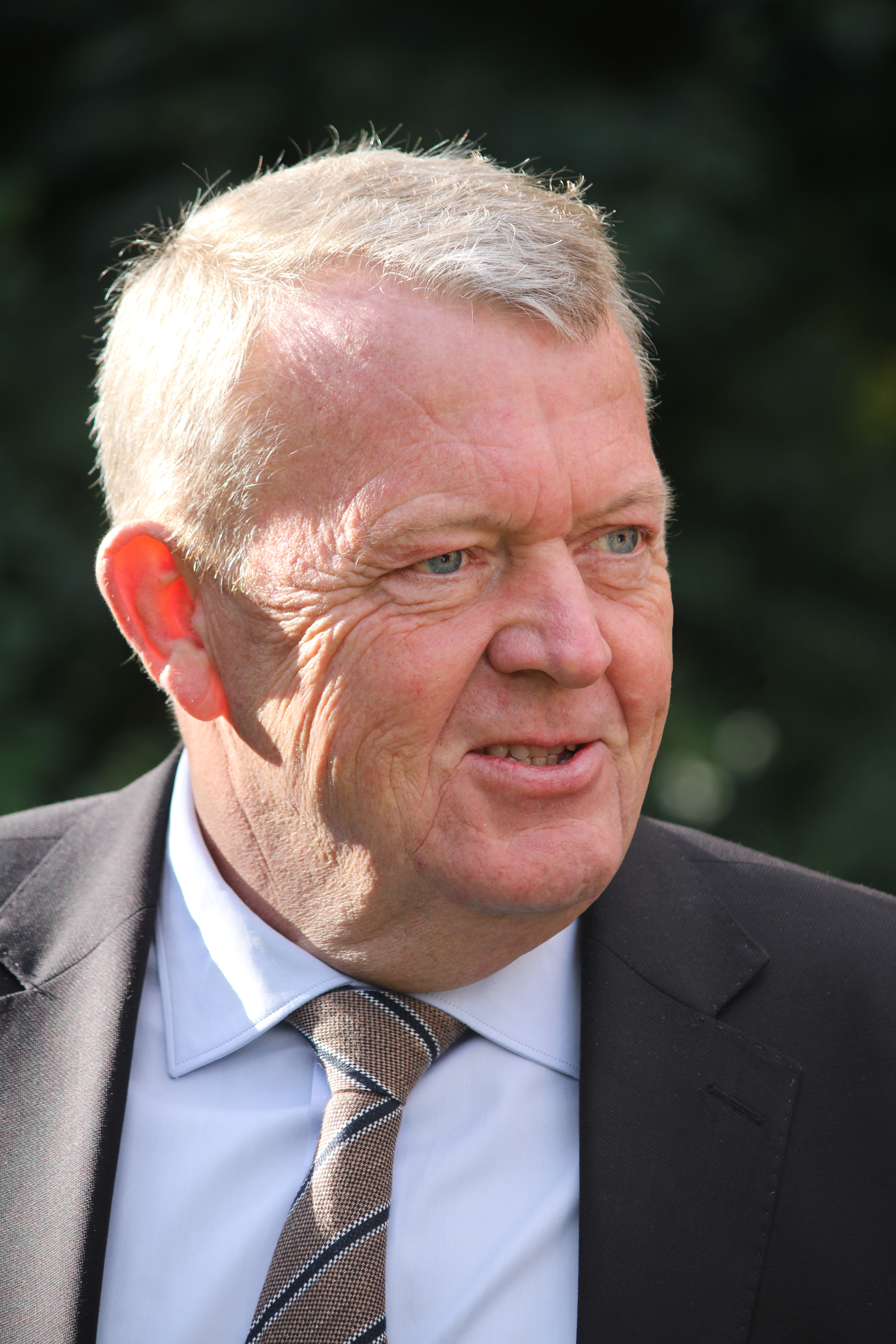
Leaders of the three parties: Prime Minister Mette Frederiksen, Defence Minister Troels Lund Poulsen, and Foreign Minister Lars Løkke Rasmussen

Lars Løkke Rasmussen, the leader of the Moderates who had long positioned himself as kingmaker, did not end up with the decisive seats because of the left-leaning majority. Instead, it was the Social Liberals, traditionally a member of the red bloc, that stated a desire of wanting to go beyond bloc politics like the Moderates, despite achieving one of their worst ever results, meaning that along with the Moderates, they could determine the next government. Sofie Carsten Nielsen resigned as leader of the Social Liberals following its poor performance in the election. A total of 64 new politicians were elected to the Folketing for the first time at the 2022 election, the third-most in Danish history, only being trumped by the 1973 and 2011 general elections. The new members are mainly from the Denmark Democrats, Liberal Alliance, and Moderates.

On 23 November, the Red–Green Alliance and The Alternative announced they had left the government negotiations, bringing the number of negotiating parties to 8: the Social Democrats, Venstre, the Moderates, the Green Left, Liberal Alliance, the Conservatives, the Social Liberals and the Danish People's Party. The Denmark Democrats and New Right had earlier left the negotiations. On 3 December, the Conservatives exited the negotiations, reducing the number of negotiating parties to seven. The Social Liberals left the negotiations on 13 December. The same day, Mette Frederiksen went to the queen to present her new government, which includes the Moderates and Venstre; the first time the Social Democrats and Venstre formed a government together since 1978. Leader of Venstre, Jakob Elleman-Jensen, became deputy prime minister and minister of defence while leader of the Moderates Lars Løkke Rasmussen was made foreign minister. Nine Social Democrats lost their ministerial positions due to the formation of the new cabinet. Two ministers, both from the Moderates, are not members of the Folketing. This marked the first time since 2007 that a prime minister was reelected into a consecutive term.

== See also ==
- List of members of the Folketing, 2022–
