= Bredal, Denmark =

Village in Vejle Muncipality, Denmark

Bredal
- Village
- Location in Region of Southern Denmark Bredal (Denmark)
- Coordinates: 55°44′53″N 9°38′33″E
- Country: Denmark
- Region: Southern Denmark
- Municipality: Vejle Municipality

Population (2026)
  - Total: 614

Bredal is a village, with a population of 614 (1 January 2026), in Vejle Municipality, Region of Southern Denmark in Denmark.

== Location ==
Bredal is located at the road between Vejle and Horsens 8 km northeast of Vejle.

== History ==
Bredal Kro (Bredal Inn) dating back to 1847 is located in the village.
