= Red–Green Alliance (Denmark) =

Left-wing Danish political party

Red–Green Alliance Enhedslisten – De Rød-Grønne
- Abbreviation: EL; Ø (Note: Official party letter on voting ballot)
- Leader: Collective leadership
- Political spokesperson: Pelle Dragsted
- Founded: 2 December 1989
- Merger of: Left Socialists; Communist Party of Denmark (until 2023); Socialist Workers Party; Communist Workers Party independents
- Headquarters: Studiestræde 24, 1455 Copenhagen
- Youth wing: Cooperating with RGU youth organization
- Membership (2021): ▼9,398
- Ideology: Socialism; Eco-socialism; Environmentalism; Marxism; Anti-capitalism
- Political position: Left-wing to far-left
- European affiliation: European Left Alliance for the People and the Planet; Now the People ! European Anti-Capitalist Left
- European Parliament group: The Left in the European Parliament
- Nordic affiliation: Nordic Green Left Alliance
- Colours: Red; Green; Orange (customary)
- Folketing: 11 / 179 (Note: Only 175 of the 179 seats in the Danish Parliament, the Folketing, are obtainable by Danish political parties as Greenland and the Faroe Islands are assigned two seats each due to their status as territories in the Kingdom of Denmark.)
- European Parliament: 1 / 15
- Regions: 8 / 205
- Municipalities: 111 / 2,432

Election symbol

Website
- enhedslisten.dk

The Red–Green Alliance, or Unity List, (Danish: Enhedslisten – De Rød-Grønne, lit. 'The Unity List – The Red–Greens', EL) is an eco-socialist political party in Denmark. It was founded in 1989 with the merger of three Marxist parties, and is the most left-wing party in the Folketing, where it advocates for the expansion of the welfare state and social justice as well as the socialist transformation of Denmark and the entire globe. During the 2021 Copenhagen City Council election the party placed first, with 24.6% of the votes. The party is also active in various trade unions within Denmark.

A socialist party that puts emphasis on democracy and environmentalism, it is a pragmatic party, having worked with the more moderate Social Democrats, despite being associated with the radical left.

== Ideological position ==
The party describes itself as a democratic and socialist grassroots party, which represents green politics, among the Danish peace, civil and political rights, and labour movements. The party's ideological position is set out in a manifesto from 2014. It proposes that a socialistic society of the future "neither can nor should be described in detail, but rather be developed and shaped by the people living in it". It describes socialism as "an answer to the problems caused by capitalism such as non-sufficient democracy, crises, destruction of nature, inequality, racism and war".

Holding anti-capitalist, as well as soft Eurosceptic views, it states this about the economic system:

A new and actually democratic system of society requires fundamental changes in the ownership of the means of production, such as companies, land and natural resources. Collective forms of ownership will be dominating. We propose that public authorities, co-workers, local communities and other collectives of persons should own and run institutions and companies. ... A democratic economy means a democratic work life as well. The work place should be characterized by democracy, and the employees must have a constitutional right to decisive influence on the organization of work in the workplace.

The Red–Green Alliance recognizes that methods achieving this may differ depending on the course of class struggle, but will eventually require a revolution—one that must be supported by a majority of the population manifested through democratic and free elections. The party often adopts particular views in relation to the other parties in the Folketing and opt out of many of the settlements reached, seen as an expression of class collaboration. Until the conditions for the party's long-term goal are presented, the party will use its seats in parliament to vote for any improvement and against any deterioration of working-class people's lives. In line with this, the party agreed at its national conference in 2010 that if Helle Thorning-Schmidt became Prime Minister after the 2011 election, the party would vote for a "red" budget bill that did not contain obvious flaws.

== Policies ==
=== Social policy ===
The party places great emphasis on the fight against social inequality and poverty, and is in favour of strengthening and expanding the welfare state. The party believes there is a place in society for all forms of diversity, including gender, sexuality, disability and ethnic background. It also advocates for a larger public sector, among other things, to improve quality of life for public sector employees. The party believes people should be free to choose when they want to get an education and is opposed to tuition fees, which they believe harm opportunities for everyone to acquire an education. The party does not see unemployment as being equal to laziness and seeks to abolish the Danish equivalent of workfare.

=== Economic policy ===
The party is decisively anti-capitalist and has particularly distinguished itself as an opponent of transfer pricing, whereby multinational companies minimise the amount they pay in tax by attributing their profits to countries with lower tax rates. In response to the Great Recession of 2007–2009, the Red–Green Alliance urged stricter control of loans, the introduction of a Tobin tax, and the nationalisation of banks and mortgage companies. It also believes that the public sector must be expanded, the wages of the lowest-paid workers raised, and that the insurance-based unemployment benefit period should be extended to a minimum of four years. At the same time, it believes that students should be given a greater grant to be used in state education. At minimum, all benefits should be raised to 13,500 kroner per month before taxes.

=== Foreign policy ===
The party advocates for foreign policy based on the respect for human rights, which it believes has never been appropriately prioritised in the past. It also proposes greater support for developing countries through a doubling of foreign aid, and campaigns for Denmark's withdrawal from NATO. In March 2019, the party announced it would no longer campaign for a referendum to leave the EU, pointing to Brexit illustrating the need for clarity before withdrawal can be considered.

The party operates on the fundamental belief that peace is preferable to war, and opposed to Denmark's participation in the wars in Iraq and Afghanistan from the onset of them. That principle was challenged in 2011, when the party's parliamentary group voted in favour of Denmark's participation in the United Nations-sanctioned military action in Libya on the basis that it was a humanitarian action. However, the decision led to significant backlash, and the party's support was pulled back after the military intervention began. The party is outspoken in support of Palestinians' right to self-determination, amidst the Gaza genocide. Through its membership of the European Left Alliance for the People and the Planet, it supports the European Citizens' Initiative 'Justice for Palestine', which demands the European Union to suspend the EU–Israel Association Agreement.

== History ==
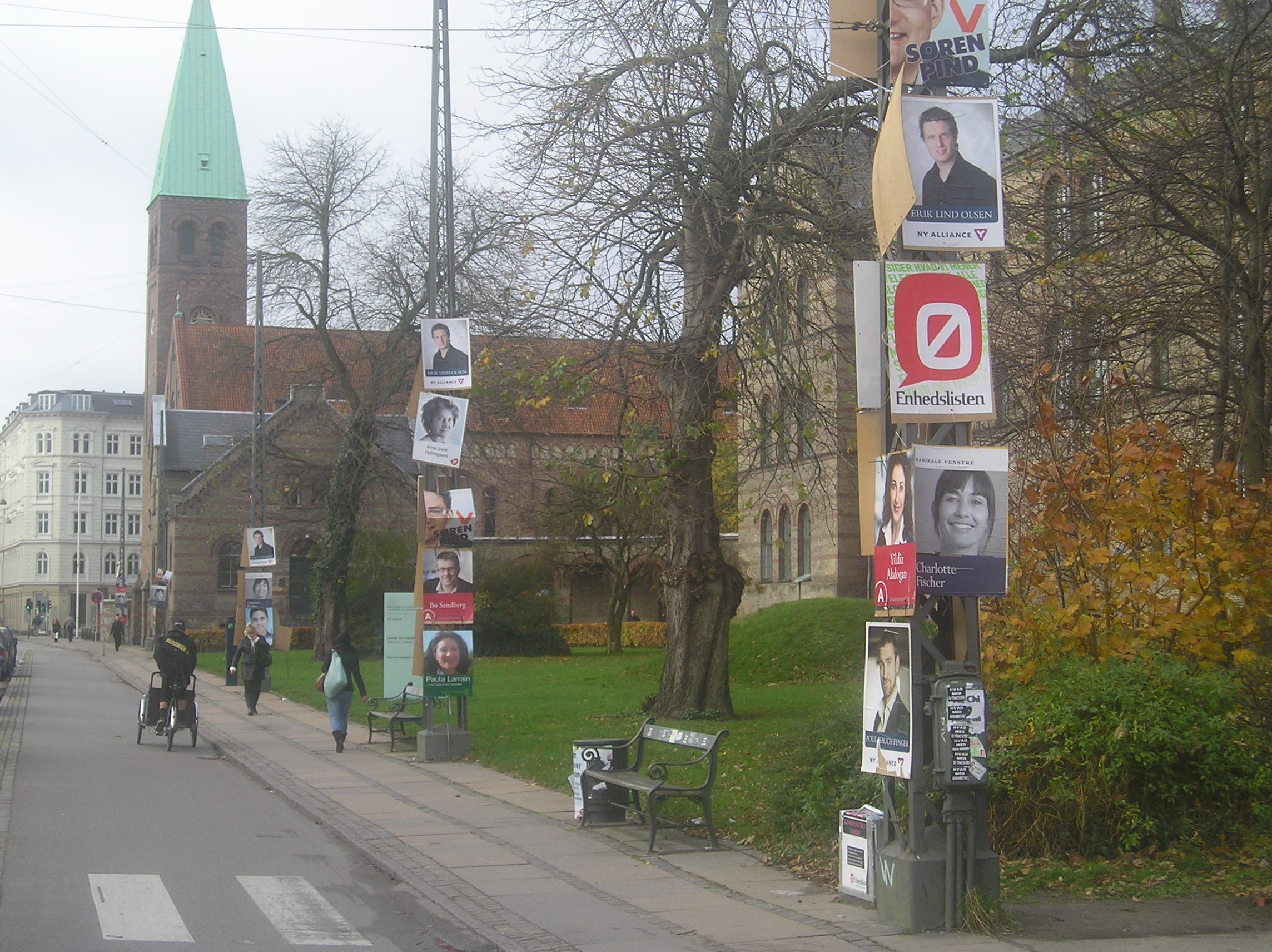
Election posters, including Red–Green Alliance, at the parliamentary elections in 2007.

The party was formed in 1989 as an electoral alliance of three left-wing parties: Left Socialists (VS), Communist Party of Denmark (DKP), and Socialist Workers Party (SAP). Originally the plan was to unite these parties alongside The Greens (De Grønne), Common Course, and Humanist to form a broad-based progressive movement, but this did not materialize. A fourth party, the Communist Workers Party (KAP), succeeded in joining the alliance in 1991, but its involvement was vetoed a year later by DKP.

Prior to the 2007 Danish general election, the party nominated Asmaa Abdol-Hamid, a Muslim candidate who was noted for her support from imams, and her refusal to shake hands with men. These facts, and some of her statements regarding politics and religion, made her the target of some criticism across the political spectrum, particularly from the Danish People's Party. Some left-wing figures cited her candidacy as a reason for withdrawing their support from the party. An anti-religious network was created within the party with the stated goal of turning the party into a solely atheist party with a materialist–Marxist basis. During the campaign, there was some speculation as to whether her candidacy would attract or repel voters. The results of the election were 2.2% for the party, down from 3.4% in the 2005 Danish general election. Although not elected, Abdol-Hamid maintained that she had attracted voters to the party. The four seats won by the party went to Frank Aaen, Johanne Schmidt-Nielsen, Line Barfod, and Per Clausen.

In the 2011 Danish general election, the party received 6.7% of the vote and tripled its representation from 4 seats to 12 seats. This was attributed to the unpopular decision of the Socialist People's Party to enter a governing coalition, with left-wing voters being attracted to the Red-Green Alliance instead. The party contested the 2013 local elections on a platform of improving public transport and making greater public investment. As part of the left-leaning "Red bloc" coalition with the Social Democrats, the Red–Green Alliance accepted the government budget twice and was in opposition twice in the period from 2011 to 2015, but at no point did they report direct opposition to the government. In the 2015 general election, the party received 7.8% of the vote and increased its representation from 12 to 14 seats. For the 2019 European Parliament election, the party voted in a landmark decision to stand a candidate, having hitherto endorsed the People's Movement against the EU. The Red-Green Alliance's Nikolaj Villumsen won a seat at the expense of the People's Movement, and sat with The Left in the European Parliament The Socialist Youth Front ceased co-operation with the Red-Green Alliance in 2025, citing the party's 'moderation', growing nationalism and acceptance of Denmark's position in NATO. In the 2026 general election, the party increased from 9 to 11 seats.

== Organization ==
=== Leadership ===
The party is the only one in the Folketing which does not have an official party leader, instead having collective leadership. However, since 2009 it has had a political spokesperson, who has served as the party's de facto representative, and serves as its leader in party leader debates.

==== List of political spokespersons ====
- Johanne Schmidt-Nielsen (2009–2016)
- Pernille Skipper (2016–2021)
- Mai Villadsen (2021–2023)
- Pelle Dragsted (2023–present)

=== Elected representatives ===
==== 2022 general election ====
- Jette Gottlieb
- Peder Hvelplund
- Rosa Lund
- Søren Egge Rasmussen
- Søren Søndergaard
- Victoria Velásquez
- Mai Villadsen
- Pelle Dragsted
- Trine Mach

=== Membership ===
| Year | Membership | Change |
|---|---|---|
| 1992 | 1,082 | – |
| 1993 | 999 | -7.7% |
| 1994 | 1,093 | +9.4% |
| 1995 | 1,189 | +8.8% |
| 1996 | 1,282 | +7.8% |
| 1997 | 1,479 | +15.4% |
| 1998 | 2,023 | +36.8% |
| 1999 | 1,968 | -2.7% |
| 2000 | 1,945 | -1.1% |
| 2001 | 1,992 | +2.4% |
| 2002 | 2,366 | +18.8% |
| 2003 | 2,321 | -1.9% |
| 2004 | 2,524 | +8.7% |
| 2005 | 3,739 | +48.1% |
| 2006 | 4,127 | +10.4% |
| 2007 | 4,099 | -0.7% |
| 2008 | 4,330 | +5.6% |
| 2009 | 4,373 | +1.0% |
| 2010 | 4,553 | +4.1% |
| 2011 | 7,714 | +51.0% |
| 2012 | 9,385 | +21.7% |
| 2013 | 9,483 | +1.0% |
| 2014 | 9,023 | -4.9% |
| 2015 | 9,504 | +5.3% |
| 2016 | 9,335 | -1.8% |
| 2017 | 9,015 | -3.4% |
| 2018 | 8,936 | -3.4% |
| 2019 | 9,662 | +8.1% |

== Election results ==
=== Parliament ===
| Election | Votes | % | Seats | +/– | Government |
|---|---|---|---|---|---|
| 1990 | 54,038 | 1.7 (#10) | 0 / 179 | 0 | Extra-parliamentary |
| 1994 | 104,701 | 3.1 (#7) | 6 / 179 | ▲6 | Opposition |
| 1998 | 91,933 | 2.7 (#8) | 5 / 179 | ▼1 | External support |
| 2001 | 82,685 | 2.4 (#7) | 4 / 179 | ▼1 | Opposition |
| 2005 | 114,123 | 3.4 (#7) | 6 / 179 | ▲2 | Opposition |
| 2007 | 74,982 | 2.2 (#8) | 4 / 179 | ▼2 | Opposition |
| 2011 | 236,860 | 6.7 (#6) | 12 / 179 | ▲8 | External support |
| 2015 | 274,463 | 7.8 (#4) | 14 / 179 | ▲2 | Opposition |
| 2019 | 244,664 | 6.9 (#6) | 13 / 179 | ▼1 | External support |
| 2022 | 181,452 | 5.1 (#8) | 9 / 179 | ▼4 | Opposition |
| 2026 | 226,037 | 6.3 (#8) | 11 / 179 | ▲2 | External support |

Red–Green Alliance tends to have a higher vote share in large urban areas, especially in the Copenhagen Municipality. In the 2022 Danish general election, it became the largest party in 4 nomination districts of the municipality, namely Inner City, Nørrebro, Bispebjerg and Vesterbro. The party is much more weakly positioned in rural parts of Denmark, having received only 2.9% of the vote outside the municipalities of the three largest cities.

=== Local elections ===
Municipal elections

| Year | Seats | |
| Year | # | ± |
|---|---|---|
| 1993 | 6 / 4,703 | New |
| 1997 | 14 / 4,685 | ▲8 |
| 2001 | 11 / 4,647 | ▼3 |
Municipal reform
| 2005 | 24 / 2,522 | ▲13 |
| 2009 | 14 / 2,468 | ▼10 |
| 2013 | 119 / 2,444 | ▲105 |
| 2017 | 102 / 2,432 | ▼17 |
| 2021 | 114 / 2,436 | ▲12 |
| 2025 | 111 / 2,436 | ▼3 |

Regional elections

| Year | Seats | |
| Year | # | ± |
|---|---|---|
| 1993 | 1 / 374 | New |
| 1997 | 2 / 374 | ▲1 |
| 2001 | 2 / 374 | 0 |
Municipal reform
| 2005 | 6 / 205 | ▲4 |
| 2009 | 2 / 205 | ▼4 |
| 2013 | 15 / 205 | ▲13 |
| 2017 | 12 / 205 | ▼3 |
| 2021 | 14 / 205 | ▲2 |
| 2025 | 8 / 205 | ▼6 |

=== European Parliament ===
Prior to 2016, the Red–Green Alliance never directly contested elections to the European Parliament, preferring to support the People's Movement against the EU. Today, the party sits in The Left in the European Parliament – GUE/NGL group. Some of the party's MPs considered running an independent list for the 2014 elections, but this idea was dismissed by a majority in the party's yearly meeting. In a historic decision in the party's yearly meeting in May 2016, a majority decided to directly contest the 2019 European Parliament election. The 2024–2029 MEP is Per Clausen.

| Year | List leader | Votes | % | Seats | +/– | EP Group |
|---|---|---|---|---|---|---|
| 2019 | Nikolaj Villumsen | 151,903 | 5.51 (#7) | 1 / 14 | New | The Left |
| 2024 | Per Clausen | 172,287 | 7.04 (#7) | 1 / 15 | 0 | The Left |

== See also ==
- List of political parties in Denmark
- Pelle Dragsted
- Politics of Denmark
