= Socialist Youth Front =

Danish political youth organization

Coordinates: 55.6785°N 12.5688°E

Socialist Youth Front Socialistisk UngdomsFront
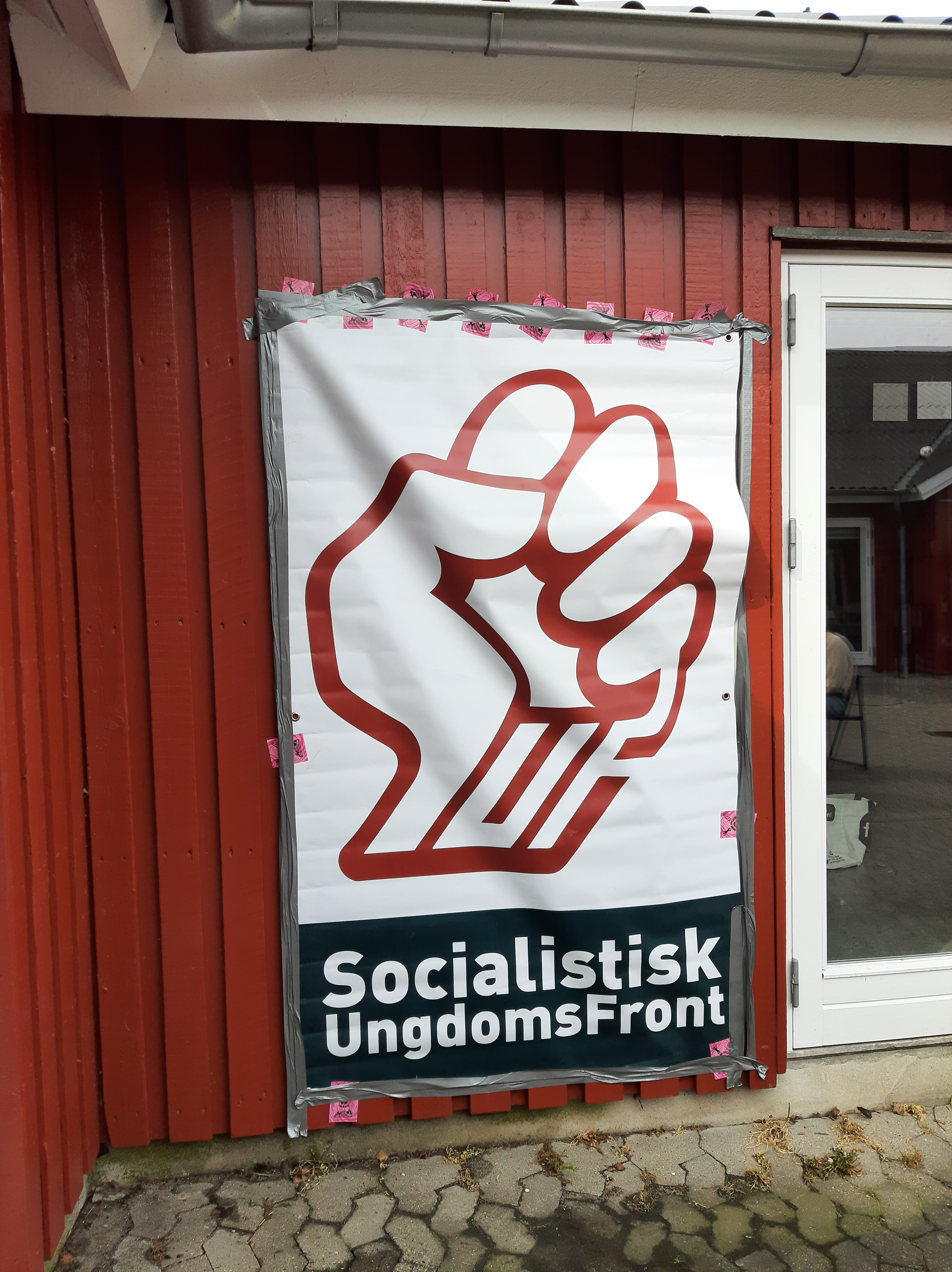
- Chairperson: Collective Leadership
- Headquarters: Studiestræde 24, 1 Copenhagen
- Ideology: Revolutionary socialism
- Website: www.ungdomsfront.dk

Socialist Youth Front (Danish: Socialistisk UngdomsFront, abbreviated SUF) is a socialist political youth organisation in Denmark, consisting of around 550 members, as of 2024 , distributed between 35 autonomous local groups.

It was established in 2001 on the initiative of the youth group Rebel and the youth network of the Red-Green Alliance (Enhedslisten). Previously, around 80 percent of SUF members were also members of the Red-Green Alliance, though SUF itself retains an extraparliamentary focus. The Socialist Youth Front ceased co-operation with the Red-Green Alliance in 2025, citing the party's 'moderation', growing nationalism and acceptance of Denmark's position in NATO.

Socialist Youth Front is a uniting organisation for the left-wing radical youth, and it consists of many ideological persuasions, ranging from Leninists, democratic socialists to anarchists. The politics and doctrine of SUF is, however, based on an anti-parliamentarian, revolutionary, and Marxist world view.

The organization publishes the external magazine Avanti, as well as the internal newsletter Blomster og Barrikader ("Flowers and Barricades").

The highest authority of the Socialist Youth Front is the national congress, which is held twice a year. Once a year, 9 members are elected to the board of leadership, which consists of 25 members, the last 16 being regional representatives who are elected locally.
