= Greenland =

Autonomous territory of Denmark

Greenland Kalaallit Nunaat (Greenlandic) Grønland (Danish)
- Autonomous territory in the Kingdom of Denmark
- Flag Coat of arms
- Anthem: "Nunarput utoqqarsuanngoravit" (Greenlandic) "Vort ældgamle land" (Danish) "Our Ancient Land"
- Kalaallit song: "Nuna asiilasooq" (Greenlandic) "The Land of Great Length" (Note: Nuna asiilasooq has equal status as a regional anthem but is generally used only in Greenland.) Royal anthems: Der er et yndigt land (Danish) (English: "There is a lovely country") Kong Christian stod ved højen mast (Danish) (English: "King Christian stood by the lofty mast")
- Location of Greenland (dark green) in the Kingdom of Denmark (light green)
- Sovereign state: Kingdom of Denmark
- Paleo-Inuit settling: c. 2500 BC
- Norse settling: 986 AD
- Greenland Norse union with Norway: 1262
- Danish-Norwegian resettlement and colonization: 1721
- Unification with Denmark: 14 January 1814
- Home rule: 1 May 1979
- Further autonomy and self rule: 21 June 2009
- Capital and largest city: Nuuk; 64°10′N 51°44′W
- Official languages: Greenlandic (Note: Greenlandic has been the sole official language of Greenland since 2009.)
- Recognized languages: Danish, English, and other languages if necessary
- Ethnic groups (2020): 89.51% Greenlandic Inuit; 7.5% Danish; 1.1% other Nordic; 1.9% others
- Religion (2010): 96.1% Christianity; 95.5% Lutheranism (official); 0.2% Catholicism; 0.4% other Christian; 2.5% no religion; 1.4% other
- Demonym(s): Greenlandic; Greenlander
- Government: Devolved parliamentary government within a unitary constitutional monarchy
  - Monarch: Frederik X
  - Prime Minister of Denmark: Mette Frederiksen
  - High Commissioner: Julie Præst Wilche
  - Prime Minister of Greenland: Jens-Frederik Nielsen
  - Speaker of the Inatsisartut: Kim Kielsen
- Legislature: Folketinget (Kingdom of Denmark); Inatsisartut (Greenland)

National representation
  - Folketing (2 members): Aaja Chemnitz Larsen (IA); Aki-Matilda Høegh-Dam (N)

Area
  - Total: 2,166,086 km^{2} (836,330 sq mi)
  - Water (%): 0 (Note: As of 2000: 410,449 km^{2} (158,475 sq mi) ice-free (18.9%); 1,755,637 km^{2} (677,855 sq mi) ice-covered (81.1%). Density: 0.14/km^{2} (0.36/sq mi) for ice-free areas.)
- Highest elevation: 3,700 m (12,100 ft)

Population
  - 2025 estimate: ▲56,831 (210th)
  - Density: 0.028/km^{2} (0.1/sq mi)
- GDP (PPP): 2023 estimate
  - Total: ▲$4.48 billion
  - Per capita: ▲$78,840
- GDP (nominal): 2023 estimate
  - Total: ▲$3.33 billion
  - Per capita: ▲$58,499
- Gini (2023): ▲56.0 high
- HDI (2023): ▲0.852 very high · 52nd
- Currency: Danish krone (DKK)
- Time zone: UTC±00:00 to UTC-04:00
- Date format: dd-mm-yyyy
- Driving side: Right
- Calling code: +299
- Postal codes: 39xx
- ISO 3166 code: GL
- Internet TLD: .gl

Greenland (Note: Greenlandic: Kalaallit Nunaat, pronounced [kalaːɬːit nʉnaːt]; Danish: Grønland, pronounced [ˈkʁɶnˌlænˀ]) is an autonomous territory (Note: Danish: rigsdel, literally 'realm part') of the Kingdom of Denmark and is the largest of the kingdom's three constituent parts by land area, the others being Denmark proper and the Faroe Islands. Citizens of Greenland are citizens of Denmark. They are thus citizens of the European Union (EU), although Greenland is not part of the EU. It is the world's largest island (Note: Afro-Eurasia, the Americas, Australia, and Antarctica are all larger than Greenland, but they are generally considered continents, not islands.) and lies between the Arctic and Atlantic oceans, east of the Canadian Arctic Archipelago. It shares a small 1.2-kilometre (0.75 mi) border with Canada on Hans Island. The capital and largest city is Nuuk. Kaffeklubben Island off the northern coast is the world's northernmost undisputed point of land (Note: Stray Dog West is considered the most northerly competitor claim, although it is generally sunken at high tide.) – Cape Morris Jesup on the main island was thought to be so until the 1960s. Economically, Greenland is heavily reliant on aid from Denmark, which has averaged 5.4 billion kr. (€724 million) annually in the period 2019–2023, amounting to more than 20% of the territory's gross domestic product.

Though a part of the continent of North America, Greenland was politically and culturally associated with the European kingdom of Norway from 986 until the early 15th century. From the 18th century, following the union of Denmark and Norway and the establishment of the Nuuk settlement, Greenland gradually became associated with Denmark. Greenland has been inhabited at intervals over at least the last 4,500 years by circumpolar peoples whose forebears migrated there from what is now Canada. Norsemen from Norway settled the uninhabited southern part of Greenland beginning in the 10th century (having previously settled Iceland), and their descendants lived in Greenland for 400 years until disappearing in the late 15th century. From the late 15th century, the Portuguese attempted to find the northern route to Asia, which ultimately led to the earliest cartographic depiction of the coastline. In the 17th century, Dano-Norwegian explorers reached Greenland again, finding their earlier settlement extinct and reestablishing a permanent Scandinavian presence.

When Denmark and Norway separated in 1814, Greenland was transferred from the Norwegian to the Danish crown. The 1953 Constitution of Denmark ended Greenland's status as a colony, integrating it fully into the Danish state. In the 1979 Greenlandic home rule referendum, Denmark granted home rule to Greenland. In the 2008 Greenlandic self-government referendum, Greenlanders voted for the Self-Government Act which transferred more power from the Danish government to the local Naalakkersuisut (Greenlandic government). Under this structure, Greenland gradually assumed responsibility for governmental services and areas of competence. The Danish government retains control of citizenship, monetary policy, security policies, and foreign affairs. With the melting of the ice due to global warming, its abundance of mineral wealth, and its strategic position between Eurasia, North America, and the Arctic zone, Greenland holds strategic importance for the Kingdom of Denmark, NATO, and the European Union. Since 2025, the United States has pursued threats to annex Greenland, triggering the Greenland crisis.

Most residents of Greenland are Inuit. The population is concentrated mainly on the southwest coast, strongly influenced by climatic and geographical factors, and the rest of the island is sparsely populated. With a population of 56,583 (2022), Greenland is the least densely populated country in the world. Greenland is socially progressive, like metropolitan Denmark; education and healthcare are free, and LGBTQ rights in Greenland are some of the most extensive in the world. Sixty-seven percent of its electricity production comes from renewable energy, mostly from hydropower.

== Etymology ==
The early Norse settlers named the island Greenland. In the Icelandic sagas, the Norwegian Erik the Red was exiled from Iceland with his father, Thorvald Asvaldsson, who had committed manslaughter. With his extended family and his thralls (slaves or serfs), he set out in ships to explore an icy land known to lie to the northwest. After finding a habitable area and settling there, he named it Grœnland (translated as "Greenland"), supposedly in the hope that the pleasant name would attract settlers. The Saga of Erik the Red states: "In the summer, Erik left to settle in the country he had found, which he called Greenland, as he said people would be attracted there if it had a favourable name." The name of the territory in the Greenlandic language is Kalaallit Nunaat, 'land of the Kalaallit', the Kalaallit being the principal group of Greenlandic Inuit who inhabit the territory's western region. The Greenlandic Inuit term Nunaat does not include waters and ice.

== History ==
=== Early Palaeo-Inuit cultures ===
Areas of Independence I and Independence II cultures around Independence Fjord

In prehistoric times, Greenland was home to several successive Palaeo-Inuit cultures known primarily through archaeological finds. The earliest entry of the Palaeo-Inuit into Greenland is thought to have occurred about 2500 BC. From about 2500 BC to 800 BC, southern and western Greenland was inhabited by the Saqqaq culture. Most finds of remains from that period have been around Disko Bay, including the site of Saqqaq, for which the culture is named.

From 2400 BC to 1300 BC, the Independence I culture existed in northern Greenland. It was a part of the Arctic small-tool tradition. Towns including Deltaterrasserne appeared. About 800 BC the Saqqaq culture disappeared, and the Early Dorset culture emerged in western Greenland and the Independence II culture in northern Greenland. It is unknown whether the Dorset people ever encountered the later Thule people. The people of the Dorset culture lived mainly by hunting seals and reindeer.

=== Norse settlement ===
From 986, the west coast was settled by Icelanders and Norwegians, through a contingent of 14 boats led by Erik the Red. They formed three settlements – the Eastern Settlement, the Western Settlement, and the Middle Settlement – on fjords near the southwestern tip of the island. They shared the island with the late Dorset culture inhabitants, who occupied the northern and western parts, and later with those of the Thule culture who entered from the north. Norse Greenlanders submitted to Norwegian rule in 1261 under the Kingdom of Norway. The Kingdom of Norway entered a personal union with Denmark in 1380, and from 1397 was a part of the Kalmar Union.

Norse settlements such as Brattahlíð thrived for centuries before disappearing in the 15th century, perhaps at the onset of the Little Ice Age. Except for some runic inscriptions, the only contemporary records or historiography that survive from the Norse settlements are of their contact with Iceland or Norway. Medieval Norwegian sagas and historical works mention Greenland's economy, the bishops of Gardar, and the collection of tithes. A chapter in the Konungs skuggsjá (The King's Mirror) describes Norse Greenland's exports, imports, and grain cultivation.

Estimated extent of Arctic cultures in Greenland from 900 AD to 1500 AD. Coloured areas on each map indicate the extent and migration patterns over time of the Dorset, Thule, and Norse cultures.

Icelandic saga accounts of life in Greenland were composed in the 13th century and later but are not primary sources for the history of early Norse Greenland. Those accounts are closer to primary for more contemporaneous accounts of late Norse Greenland. Modern understanding therefore mostly depends on the physical data from archaeological sites. Interpretation of ice-core and clam-shell data suggests that between AD 800 and 1300 the regions around the fjords of southern Greenland had a relatively mild climate, several degrees Celsius warmer than usual in the North Atlantic with trees and herbaceous plants growing and livestock being farmed. Barley was grown as a crop up to the 70th parallel. The ice cores show that Greenland has had dramatic temperature shifts many times in the past 100,000 years. Similarly the Icelandic Book of Settlements records famines during the winters, in which "the old and helpless were killed and thrown over cliffs".

These Norse settlements vanished during the 14th and early 15th centuries. The demise of the Western Settlement coincides with a decrease in summer and winter temperatures. A study of North Atlantic seasonal temperature variability during the Little Ice Age showed a significant decrease in maximum summer temperatures beginning about the turn of the 14th century – as much as 6 to 8 °C (11 to 14 °F) lower than modern summer temperatures. The study also found that the lowest winter temperatures of the last 2,000 years occurred in the late 14th century and early 15th century. The Eastern Settlement was probably abandoned in the early to mid-15th century, during this cold period.

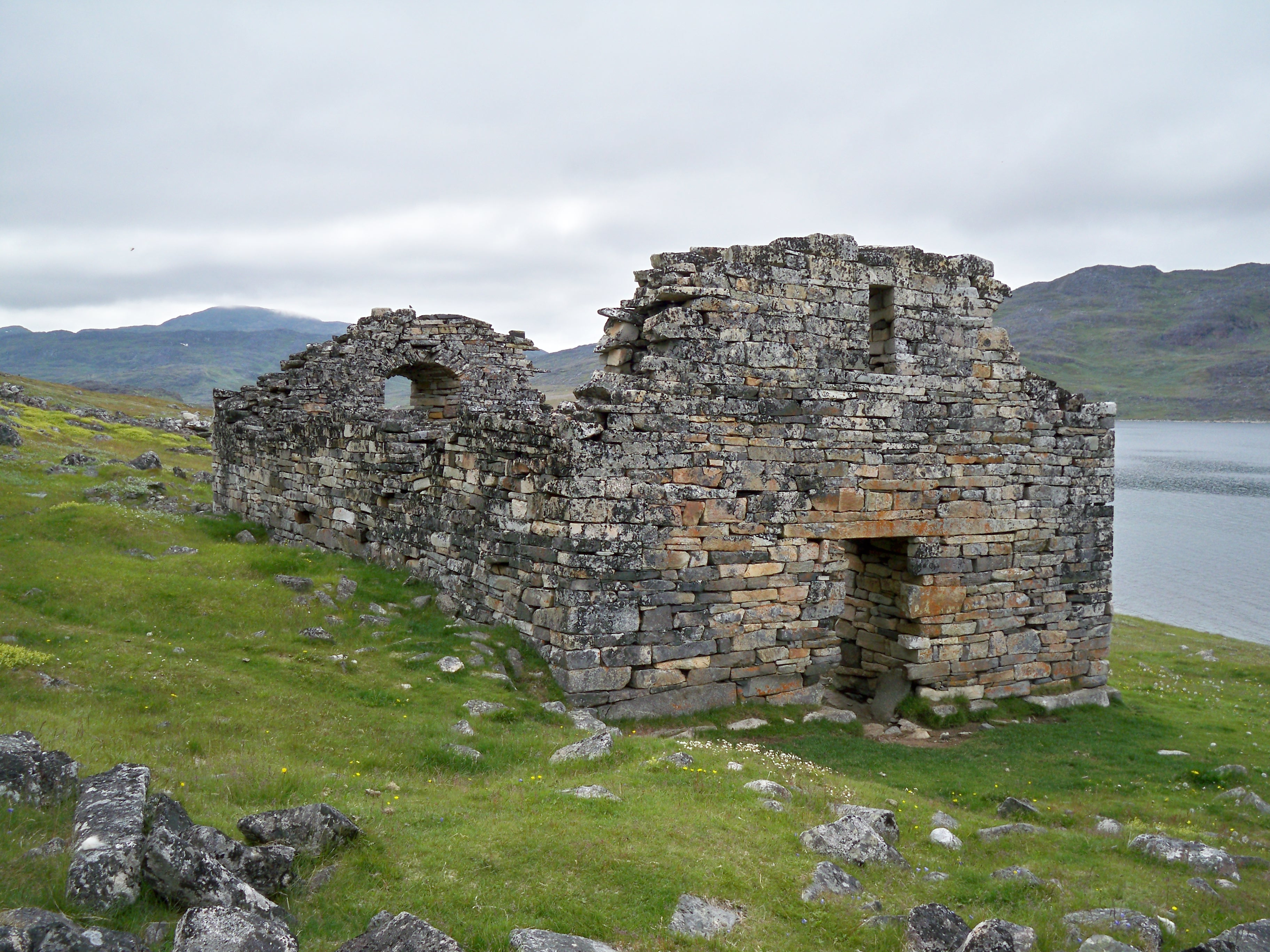
The last written records of the Norse Greenlanders are from a 1408 marriage at Hvalsey Church, which is now the best-preserved Norse ruin.

Theories drawn from archaeological excavations at Herjolfsnes in the 1920s suggest that the condition of human bones from this period indicates that the Norse population was malnourished, possibly because of soil erosion resulting from the Norsemen's destruction of natural vegetation in the course of farming, turf-cutting, and wood-cutting. Malnutrition may also have resulted from widespread deaths from pandemic plague; the decline in temperatures during the Little Ice Age; and armed conflicts with the Skrælings (Norse word for Inuit, meaning "wretches"). The Icelandic Annals record that in 1379, the Skrælings killed 18 Norse Greenlanders. Recent archaeological studies somewhat challenge the general assumption that the Norse colonization had a dramatic negative environmental effect on the vegetation. Data support traces of a possible Norse soil amendment strategy. More recent evidence suggests that the Norse, who never numbered more than about 2,500, gradually abandoned the Greenland settlements over the 15th century as walrus ivory, the most valuable export from Greenland, decreased in price because of competition with other sources of higher-quality ivory, and that there was actually little evidence of starvation or difficulties.

Other explanations of the disappearance of the Norse settlements have been proposed:

1. Lack of support from the homeland.
2. Ship-borne marauders (such as Basque, English, or German pirates), rather than Skrælings, could have plundered and displaced the Greenlanders.
3. They were "the victims of hidebound thinking and of a hierarchical society dominated by the Church and the biggest land owners. In their reluctance to see themselves as anything but Europeans, the Greenlanders failed to adopt the kind of apparel that the Inuit employed as protection against the cold and damp or to borrow any of the Eskimo hunting gear."
4. That portion of the Greenlander population willing to adopt Inuit ways and means intermarried with and assimilated into the Inuit community.
5. The structure of Norse society created a conflict between the short-term interests of those in power, and the long-term interests of the society as a whole.

=== Thule culture ===
The Thule people are the ancestors of the current Greenlandic population. No genes from the Palaeo-Inuit Dorset culture have been found in the present population of Greenland. The Thule culture migrated eastward from what is now known as Alaska around 1000 AD, reaching Greenland around 1300. The Paleo-Eskimos had been completely replaced by the Thule people (the ancestors of the Inuit), who were descended from people of the Birnirk culture of Siberia. The Thule culture was the first to introduce technological innovations such as dog sleds and toggling harpoons to Greenland. There is an account of contact and conflict with the Norse population, as told by the Inuit. It is republished in The Norse Atlantic Sagas, by Gwyn Jones. Jones reports that there is also an account of perhaps the same incident, of more doubtful provenance, told by the Norse side.

=== European interest ===
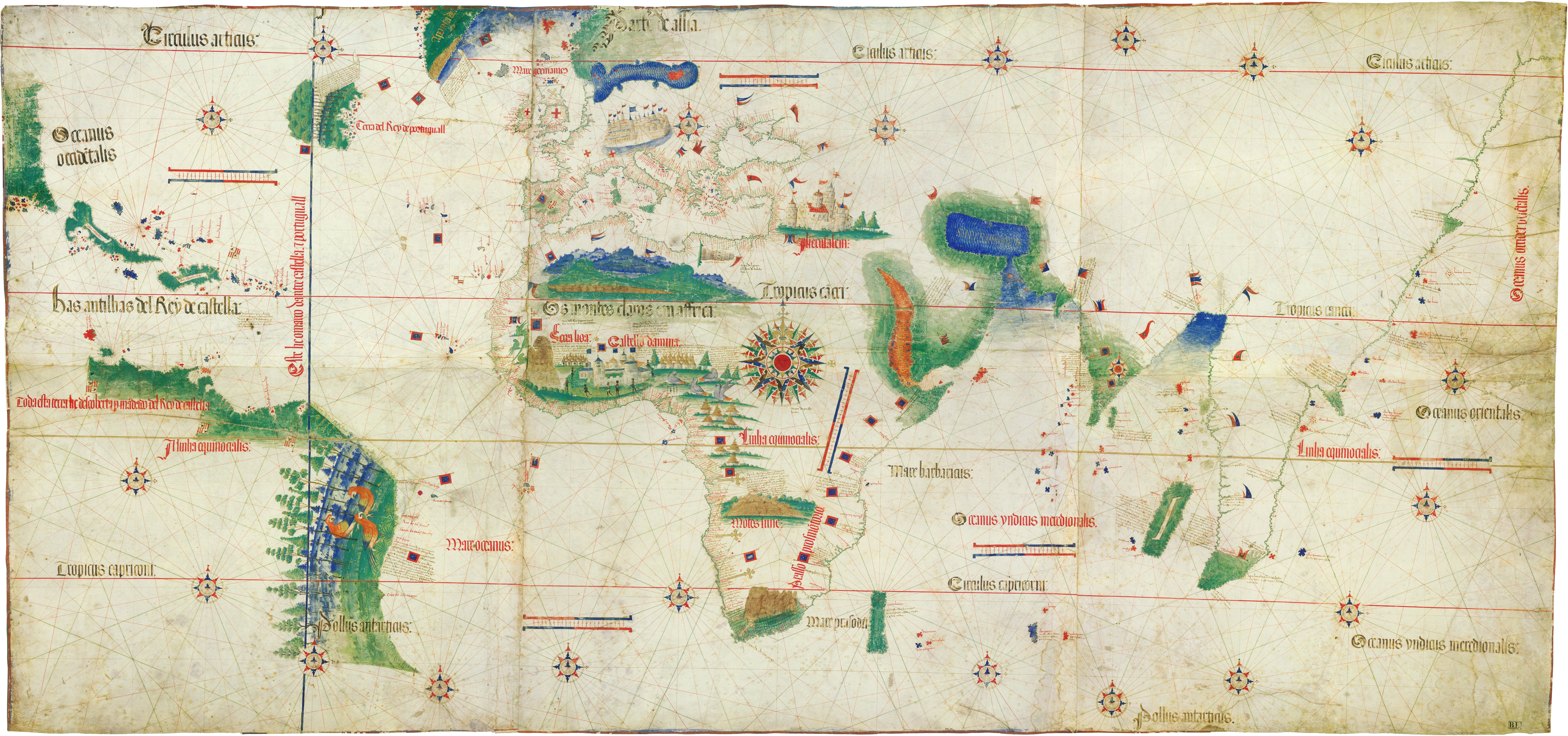
The Cantino planisphere, completed by an unknown cartographer in 1502, depicts Greenland as a Portuguese territory claimed by King Manuel I.

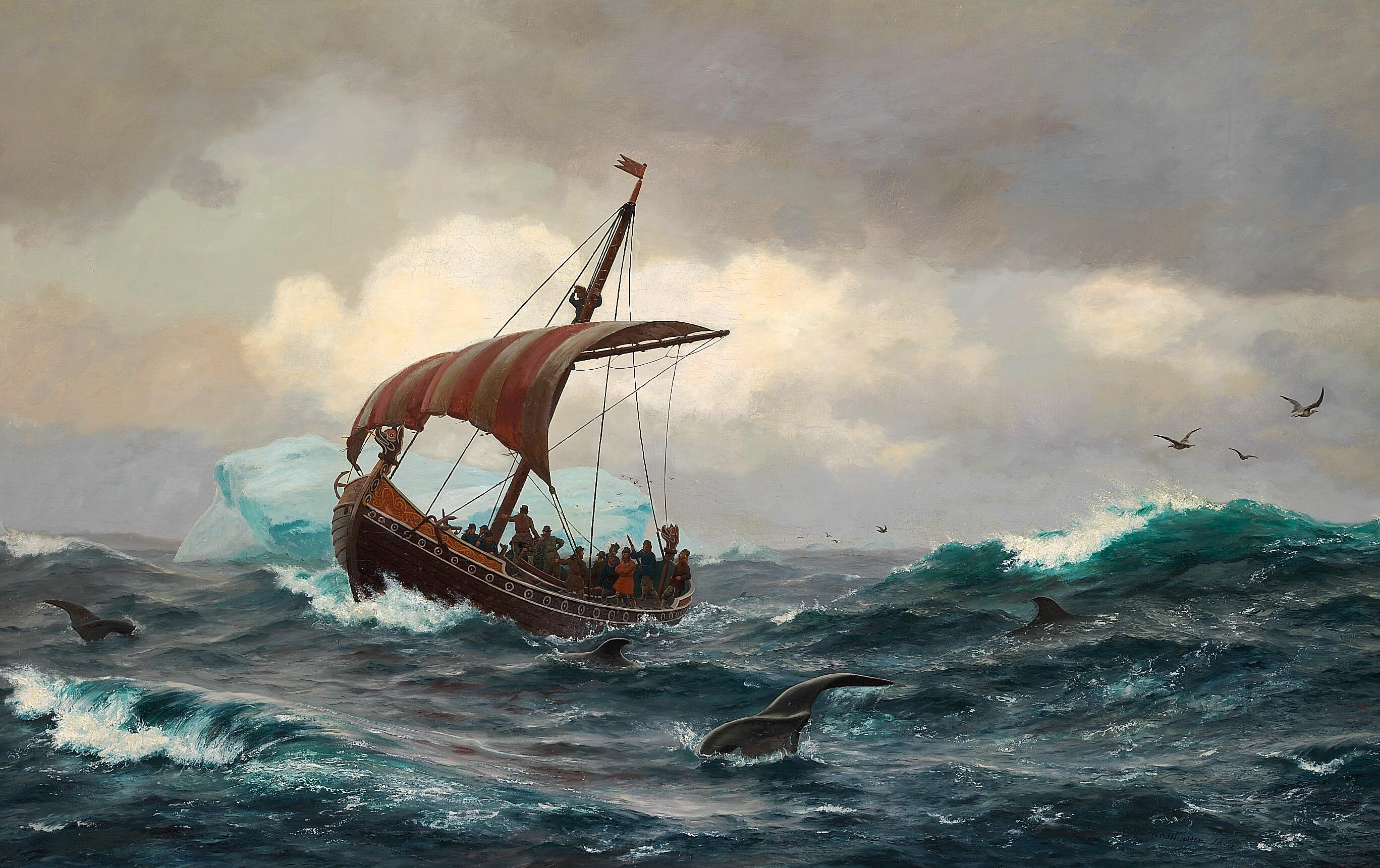
Summer Night Off the Greenland Coast Circa Year 1000, by Carl Rasmussen, 1875

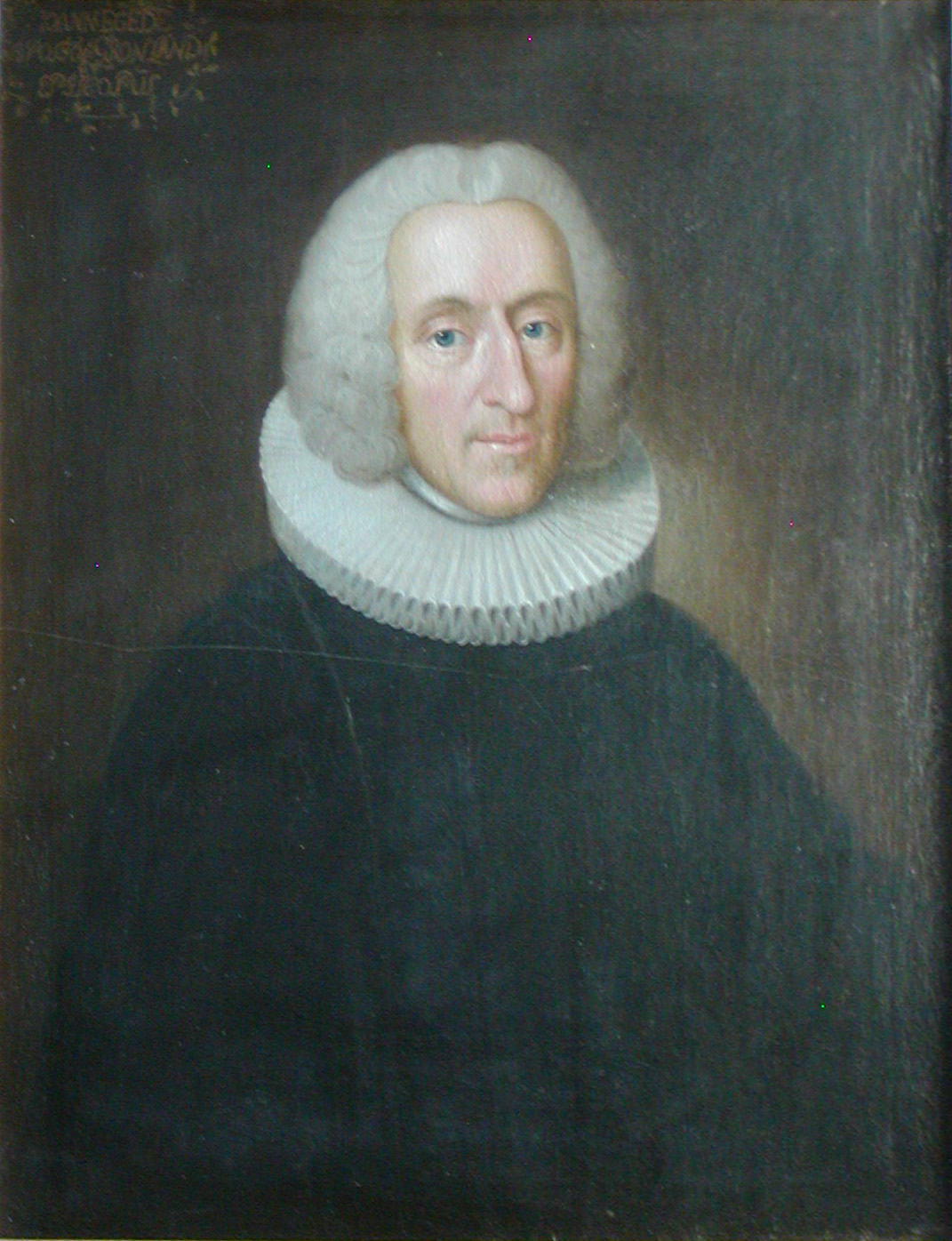
Hans Egede (1686–1758), Lutheran missionary, credited with revitalising Denmark's relationship with Greenland

In 1500, King Manuel I of Portugal sent Gaspar Corte-Real to Greenland in search of a Northwest Passage to Asia which, according to the Treaty of Tordesillas, was part of Portugal's sphere of influence. In 1501, Corte-Real returned with his brother, Miguel Corte-Real. After finding the sea frozen, they headed south and arrived in Labrador and Newfoundland. Upon the brothers' return to Portugal, the cartographic information supplied by Corte-Real was incorporated into a map of the world which was presented to Ercole I d'Este, Duke of Ferrara, by Alberto Cantino in 1502. The Cantino planisphere, made in Lisbon, accurately depicts the southern coastline of Greenland.

In 1605–1607, King Christian IV of Denmark and Norway sent a series of expeditions to Greenland and Arctic waterways to locate the lost eastern Norse settlement and assert Danish-Norwegian sovereignty over Greenland. The expeditions were mostly unsuccessful, partly due to leaders who lacked experience with the difficult Arctic ice and weather conditions, and partly because the expedition leaders were given instructions to search for the Eastern Settlement on the east coast of Greenland just north of Cape Farewell, which is almost inaccessible due to southward drifting ice. The pilot on all three trips was English explorer James Hall.

After the Norse settlements died off the various Inuit groups prevailed, but the Dano-Norwegian government never forgot or relinquished the claims to Greenland that it had inherited from the Norse. When it re-established access to Greenland in the early 17th century, Denmark-Norway asserted its sovereignty claims over the island. In 1721 a joint mercantile and clerical expedition led by Dano-Norwegian missionary Hans Egede was sent to Greenland, not knowing whether a Norse civilization remained there. This expedition was part of the Dano-Norwegian colonization of the Americas. After 15 years in Greenland, Hans Egede left his son Paul Egede in charge of the mission there and returned to Denmark, where he established a Greenland Seminary. The colony was centred at Godthåb ("Good Hope", today's Nuuk) on the southwest coast. Gradually, Greenland was opened up to Danish merchants but closed to those from other countries.

=== Treaty of Kiel to World War II (1814–1945) ===
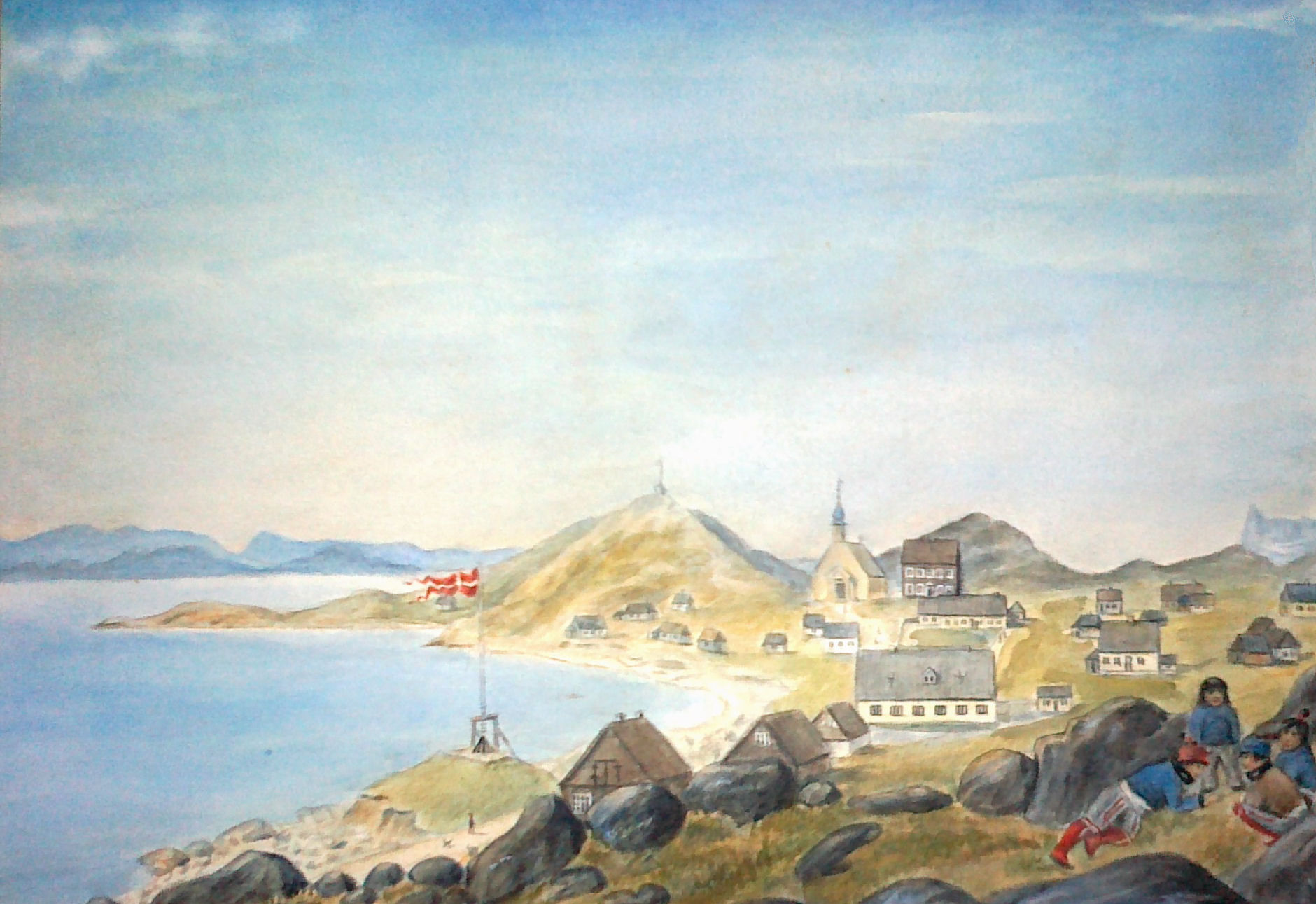
Godthåb in Greenland, c. 1878

Pictures of Greenland, c. 1863

When the union between the crowns of Denmark and Norway was dissolved in 1814, the Treaty of Kiel severed Norway's former colonies and left them under the control of the Danish monarch. Norway occupied the uninhabited eastern Greenland as Erik the Red's Land in July 1931, claiming that it constituted terra nullius. Norway and Denmark agreed to submit the matter in 1933 to the Permanent Court of International Justice, which decided against Norway.

Greenland's connection to Denmark was severed on 9 April 1940, early in World War II, after Denmark was occupied by Nazi Germany. On 8 April 1941, the United States occupied Greenland to defend it against a possible invasion by Germany. The United States' occupation of Greenland continued until 1945. Greenland was able to buy goods from the United States and Canada by selling cryolite from the mine at Ivittuut. The United States military used Bluie as a code name for Greenland, where they kept several bases named "Bluie (East or West) (sequential numeral)". The major air bases were Bluie West-1 at Narsarsuaq and Bluie West-8 at Søndre Strømfjord (Kangerlussuaq), both of which are still used as international airports.

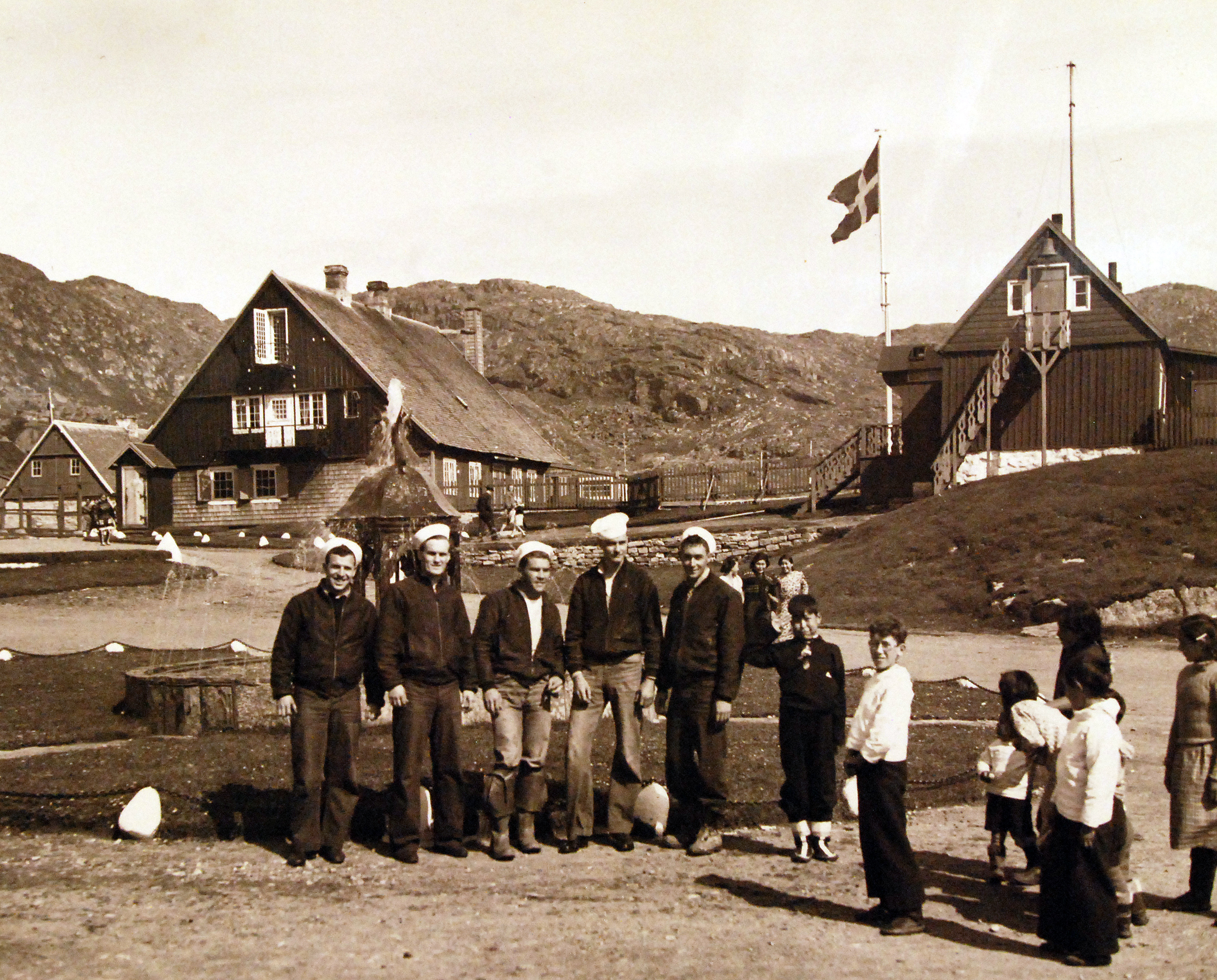
American sailors interacting with Greenlandic locals during World War II

During this war, the system of government changed: Governor Eske Brun ruled the island under a law of 1925 that allowed governors to take control under extreme circumstances; Governor Aksel Svane was transferred to the United States to lead the commission to supply Greenland. The Danish Sirius Patrol guarded the northeastern shores of Greenland in 1942 using dog sleds. They detected several German weather stations and alerted American troops, who destroyed the facilities. After the collapse of the Third Reich, Albert Speer briefly considered escaping in a small aeroplane to hide out in Greenland but changed his mind and decided to surrender to the United States Armed Forces.

Greenland had a protected and very isolated society until 1940. It was a colony, and it was believed that its society would be subject to exploitation or even eradication if the country was opened up. The Danish government had maintained a strict monopoly of Greenlandic trade, allowing no more than small scale barter trading with British whalers. In wartime Greenland developed a sense of self-reliance through self-government and independent communication with the outside world. Despite this change, in 1946 a commission including the highest Greenlandic council, the Landsrådene, recommended patience and no radical reform of the system.

=== United States and the Cold War ===
The United States offered to buy Greenland from Denmark for US$100 million in 1946 (equivalent to US$1.7 billion in 2025). Denmark firmly rejected the offer, as the island was seen as an integral part of the Danish kingdom, important to its history and national identity. In 1951 Denmark and the United States signed the Greenland Defense Agreement, which allowed the United States to keep its military bases in Greenland, and to establish new bases or "defence areas" if Denmark agreed, and if deemed necessary by NATO. The US military could freely use and move between these defence areas, but was not to infringe upon Danish sovereignty in Greenland.

The United States greatly expanded Thule Air Base between 1951 and 1953 as part of a unified NATO defence strategy. The local population of three nearby villages was moved more than 100 km (62 miles) away in the winter. The United States tried to construct a subterranean network of secret nuclear missile launch sites in the Greenlandic ice cap, named Project Iceworm. According to documents declassified in 1996, this project was managed from Camp Century from 1960 to 1966 before abandonment as unworkable. The missiles were never fielded, and necessary consent from the Danish Government to do so was never sought. The Danish government was not aware of the programme's mission until 1997, when they discovered it while looking in the declassified documents for records related to the crash of a nuclear-equipped B-52 bomber near the Thule air base in 1968.

=== Home rule and self-rule (1945–present) ===
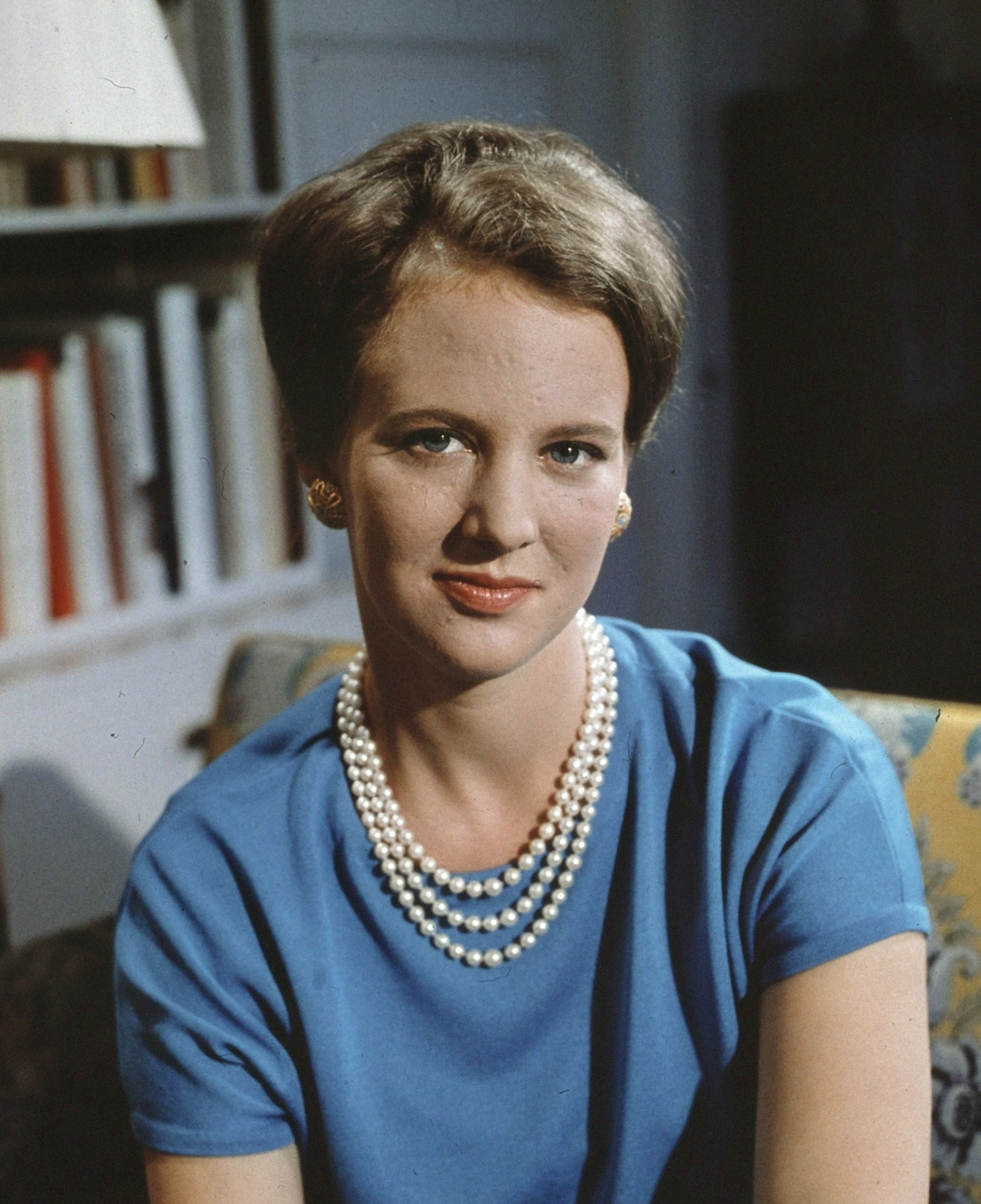
Queen Margrethe II of Denmark, during whose reign (1972–2024) Greenland received home-rule in 1979 and self-rule in 2009. Queen Margrethe II Land is named after her.

The first step towards a change of government was initiated with the Greenland Commission, which operated from 1948 to 1950. With its final report, the G-50, the first steps toward the modernization of Greenland were taken. The report recommended that Greenland become a modern welfare state, modelled after Denmark proper and with Denmark's development as sponsor, and the trade monopoly was abolished.

With the 1953 Danish constitution, Greenland's colonial status ended, and the island was incorporated into the Danish realm as an amt ('county'), and thus fully integrated into Denmark like all other Danish counties. Danish citizenship was extended to Greenlanders. Danish policies toward Greenland consisted of a strategy of cultural assimilation, fostered by a campaign of social modernization that included a large expansion of housing and infrastructure in the Danish mold to encourage the populace to move from traditional villages and trading posts into urban centers; the Greenland Provincial Council supported this expansion. One such project, the housing development Blok P in Nuuk, Denmark's largest, came to house nearly 1% of the population before its unsuitability to its many Inuit residents led the government to demolish it in 2012. The Danish government also allowed the introduction of the Danish custom of drinking alcohol, till then not sold in Greenland.

During this period, the Danish government promoted the exclusive use of the Danish language in official matters, and required Greenlanders to go to Denmark for their post-secondary education. Many Greenlandic children grew up in boarding schools in southern Denmark, and some lost their cultural ties to Greenland. While the policies "succeeded" in the sense of shifting Greenlanders from being primarily subsistence hunters into being urbanized wage earners, the Greenlandic elite began to reassert a Greenlandic cultural identity. A movement developed in favour of Greenlandic independence, reaching its peak in the 1970s. A spectrum of local political parties, broadly along European rightist-to-leftist lines, has also formed, at least one (the Inuit Ataqatigiit) asserting independence.

In 1973, an amicable border dispute between Denmark and Canada arose over the ownership of Hans Island, a small island in Nares Strait directly between Greenland and the Canadian Northwest Territories (in present-day Nunavut). The island remained in dispute until 2022, when both countries agreed to split the disputed island roughly in half. Due to political complications in relation to Denmark's entry into the European Common Market in 1972, Denmark began to seek a different status for Greenland, resulting in the Home Rule Act of 1979. A referendum was held on 17 January 1979. This gave Greenland limited autonomy, with its own legislature taking control of some internal policies, while the Parliament of Denmark maintained full control of external policies, security, and natural resources. The law came into effect on 1 May 1979. The Danish monarch remains Greenland's head of state. In 1985, Greenland left the European Economic Community (EEC), as it did not agree with the EEC's commercial fishing regulations and an EEC ban on sealskin products.

As in metropolitan Denmark, Greenland has seen significant expansion of the welfare state in the postwar era. Education and healthcare are free, and LGBTQ rights in Greenland are some of the most extensive in the Americas and the world. In 1987, the University of Greenland was founded to provide Greenlanders with higher education in their own language and country.

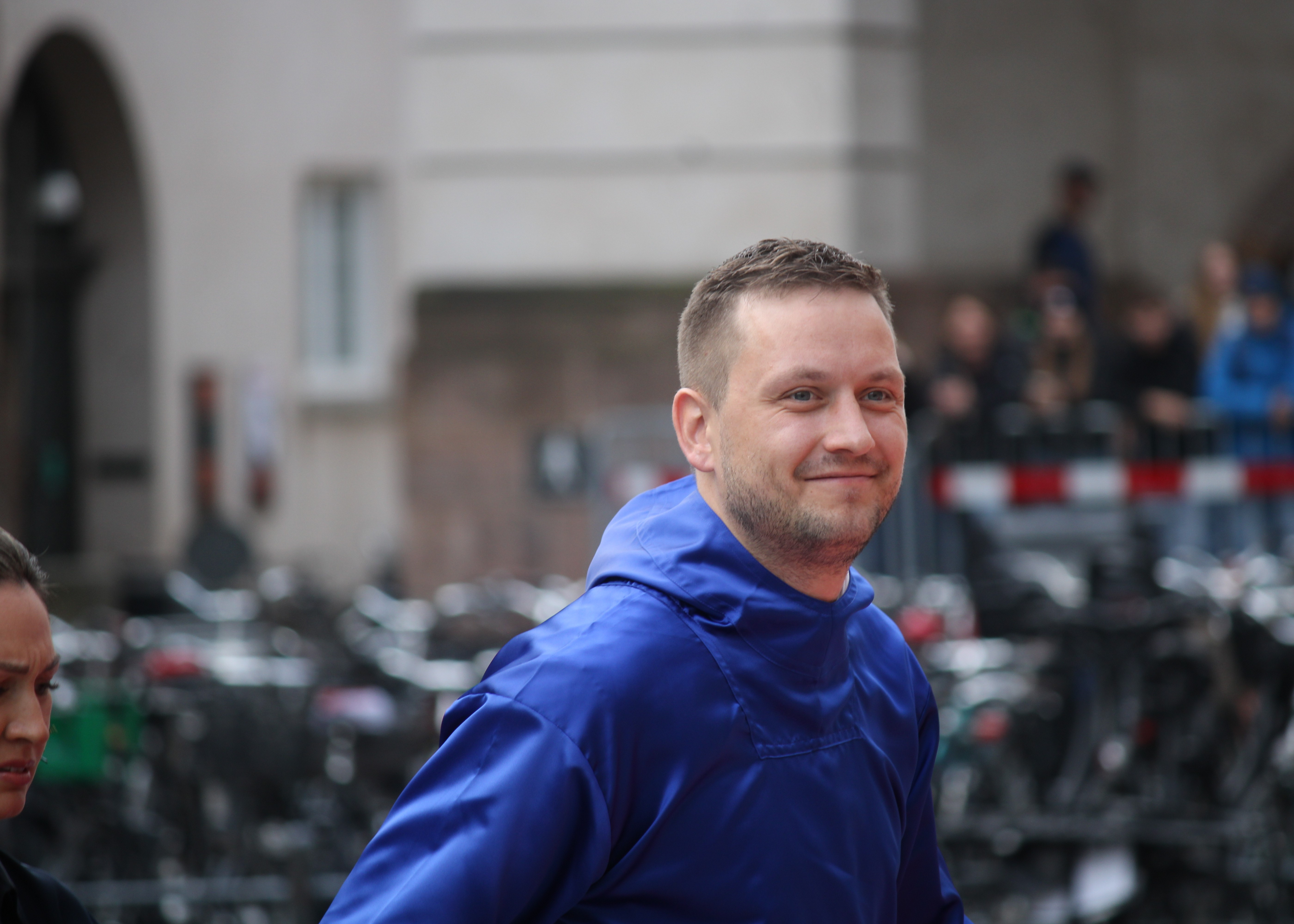
Premier Jens-Frederik Nielsen at the 2025 opening of the Danish parliament in Copenhagen. Greenland has retained strong ties with Denmark since self-rule.

Greenland voters approved a referendum on greater autonomy on 25 November 2008. According to one study, the 2008 vote created what "can be seen as a system between home rule and full independence". On 21 June 2009, Greenland gained self-rule with provisions for assuming responsibility for self-government of its judicial affairs, policing matters, and natural resources. Also, Greenlanders were recognized as a separate people under international law. Denmark maintains control of the territory's foreign affairs and defence matters, and upholds an annual block grant of 3.2 billion kr. As Greenland begins to collect revenues from its natural resources, this grant will gradually be diminished; this is generally considered to be a step toward the territory's eventual full independence from Denmark. In 2009, Greenlandic was declared the sole official language of Greenland at a historic ceremony.

=== Greenland crisis ===
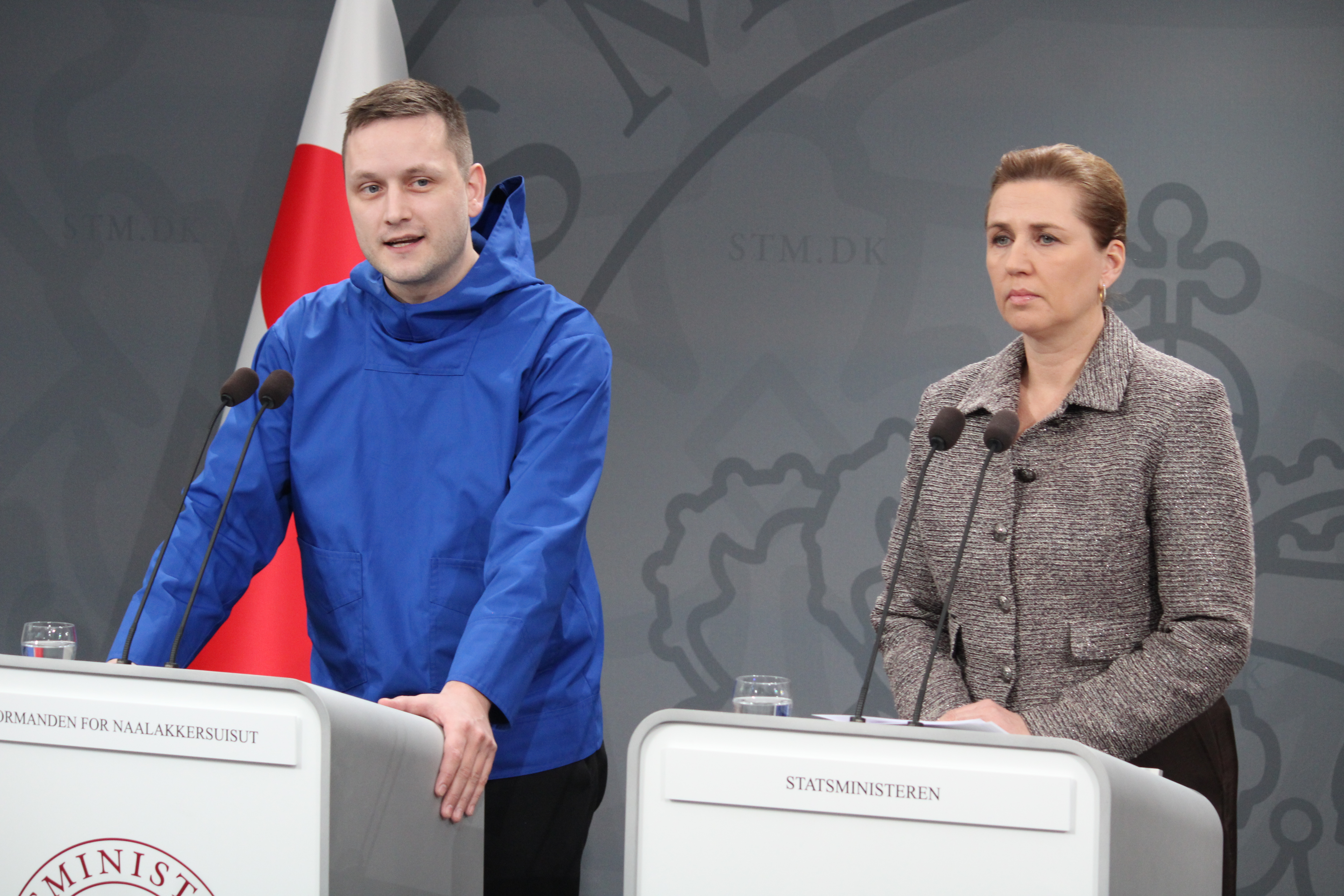
Greenlandic leader Jens-Frederik Nielsen announcing "We choose Denmark" at a January 2026 press conference with Mette Frederiksen in response to Trump's threats to invade or annex the country

During the second presidency of Donald Trump, the United States has pursued a campaign to annex Greenland by various means. This followed a failed attempt by Trump to purchase Greenland during his first presidency, that was firmly turned down by Danish Prime Minister Mette Frederiksen. The Danish Defence Intelligence Service included the United States as a potential threat to national security alongside Russia and China in its threat assessment that year. On the international stage, Trump's threats against Greenland have been described as a new, potentially unprecedented challenge to NATO.

== Geography ==
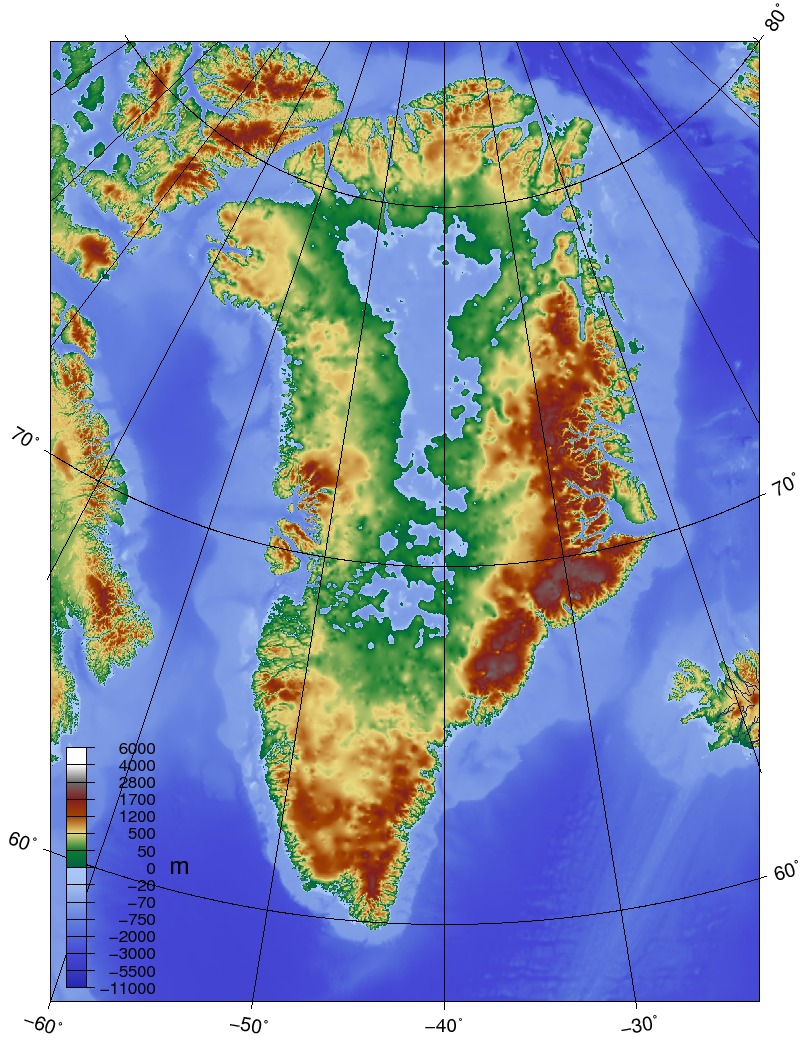
Elevation of Greenland bedrock

Greenland is the world's largest non-continental island and the third largest area in North America after Canada and the United States. It lies between latitudes 59° and 83°N, and longitudes 11° and 74°W, with over 80% of its land mass north of the Arctic Circle. It is bordered by the Arctic Ocean to the north, the Greenland Sea to the east, the North Atlantic Ocean to the southeast, the Davis Strait to the southwest, Baffin Bay to the west, and the Nares Strait and Lincoln Sea to the northwest. The nearest countries are Canada, with which it shares a maritime border to the west and southwest across Nares Strait and Baffin Bay, as well as a shared land border on Hans Island; and Iceland to the southeast. It is the largest constituent country by area in the world and is the fourth largest country subdivision in the world and largest in North America.

The total area is 2,166,086 km^{2} (836,330 sq mi) (including other offshore minor islands), of which the Greenland ice sheet covers 1,755,637 km^{2} (677,855 sq mi) (81%) and has a volume of approximately 2,850,000 km^{3} (680,000 cu mi). The highest point is Gunnbjørn Fjeld at 3,700 m (12,100 ft) of the Watkins Range (East Greenland mountain range). The majority of Greenland, however, is less than 1,500 m (4,900 ft) in elevation. The lowest temperature ever recorded in the Northern Hemisphere was recorded near the topographic summit of the Greenland ice sheet, on 22 December 1991, when the temperature reached −69.6 °C (−93.3 °F). In Nuuk, the average daily temperature varies over the seasons from −5.1 to 9.9 °C (22.8 to 49.8 °F).

Below the ice there is a series of canyons, the biggest called Greenland's Grand Canyon which was formed by flowing rivers of water from the repeated cycle of ice melting and new ice forming. Near the coast, elevations rise suddenly and steeply. The ice flows generally to the coast from the centre of the island. A survey led by French scientist Paul-Emile Victor in 1951 concluded that under the ice sheet Greenland is composed of three large islands. This is disputed, but if it is so, they would be separated by narrow straits, reaching the sea at Ilulissat Icefjord, at Greenland's Grand Canyon and south of Nordostrundingen. All towns and settlements of Greenland are situated along the ice-free coast, with the population being concentrated along the west coast. The northeastern part of Greenland is not part of any municipality and is the site of the world's largest national park, Northeast Greenland National Park.

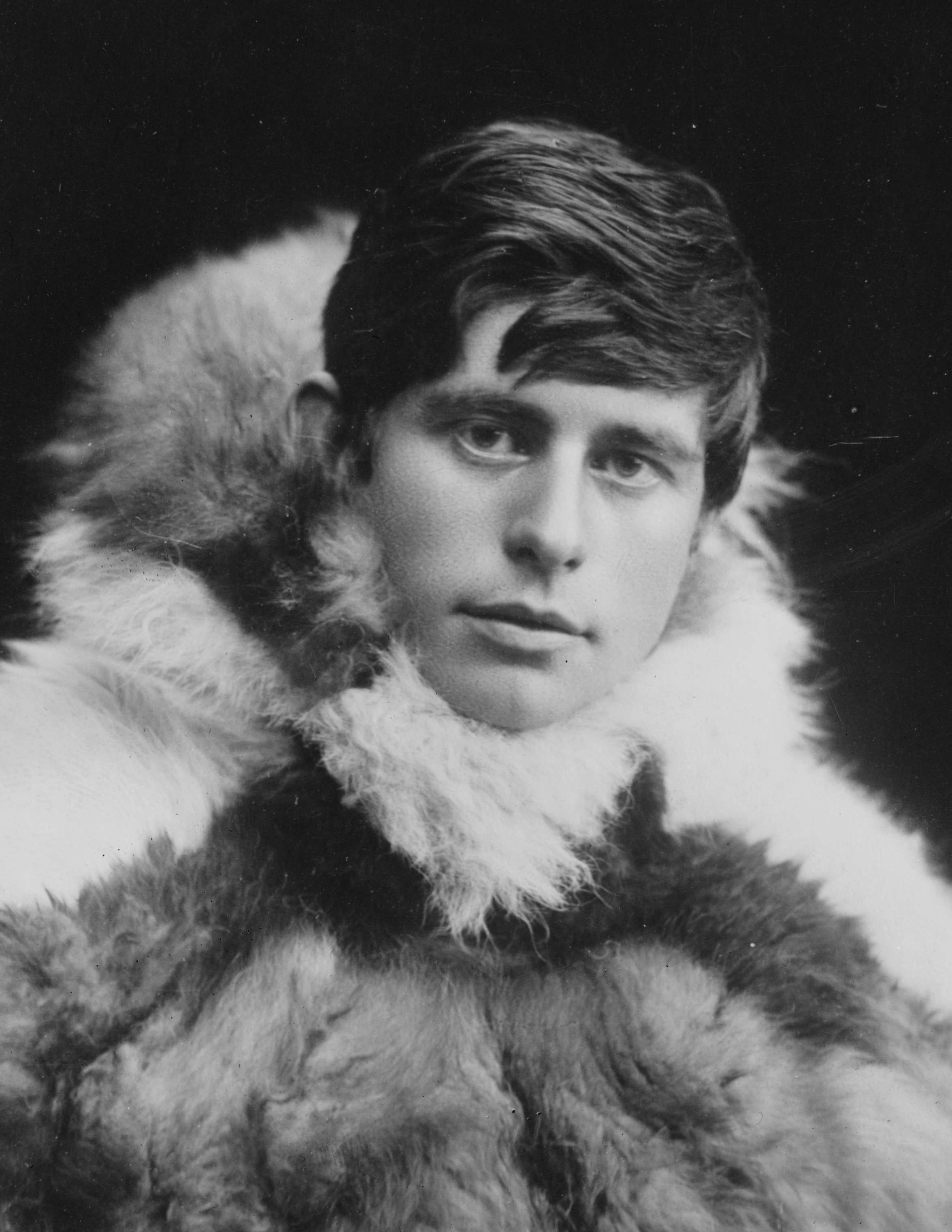
The polar explorer and anthropologist Knud Rasmussen (1879–1933), called the "father of Eskimology", was the first to explore the Greenland ice sheet by dog sled.

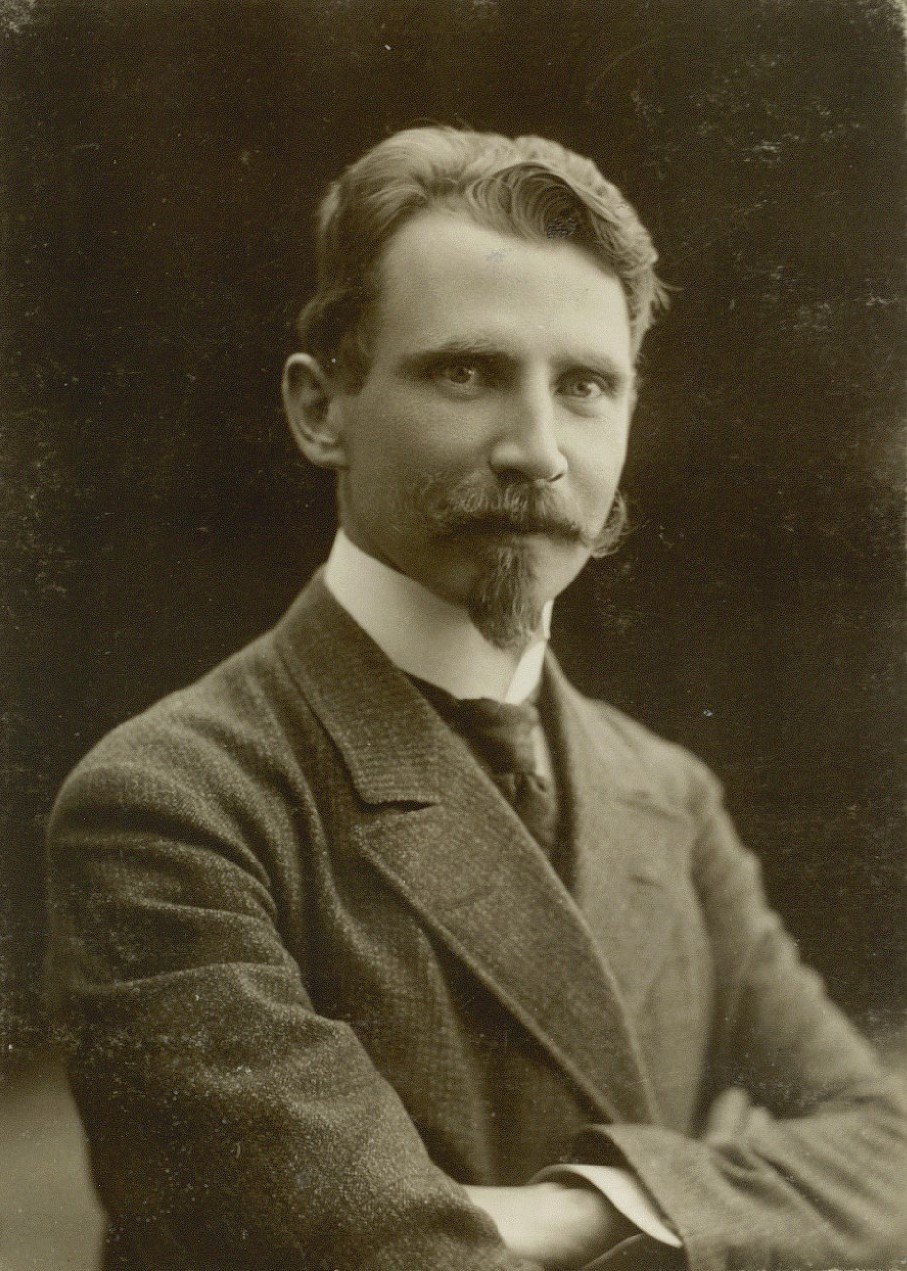
Ludvig Mylius-Erichsen (1872–1907), who died while commander of the 1906–1908 Denmark expedition, documenting vast areas of unexplored coastlines and fjords

At least four scientific expedition stations and camps had been established on the ice sheet in the ice-covered central part of Greenland (indicated as pale blue in the adjacent map): Eismitte, North Ice, North GRIP Camp and Raven Skiway. There is a year-round station Summit Camp on the ice sheet, established in 1989. The radio station Jørgen Brønlund Fjord was, until 1950, the northernmost permanent outpost in the world. The extreme north of Greenland, Peary Land, is not covered by an ice sheet because the air there is too dry to produce snow, which is essential in the production and maintenance of an ice sheet.

=== Northernmost land ===
The northernmost point of land on Earth was long thought to be Cape Morris Jesup at the northern tip of mainland Greenland. However, in 1969 a Canadian team surveyed Kaffeklubben Island (latitude 83° 39′ 45″ N), which was first recorded in 1900 and first visited in 1921, and determined that its northernmost point is 750 metres (2,460 ft) north of Cape Morris Jesup. It is thus the northernmost undisputed permanent land.

Other points have been claimed to be the northernmost point, with dispute over the title arising from ice sheets, water movement and inundation, and storm activity that may build, shift, or destroy banks of gravelly moraine material. In 1978 Uffe Petersen, a member of the Danish Geodetic Institute, discovered Oodaaq Island at 83° 40' 32.5" N. Its last confirmed sighting was in 1979. In 2003, a small protrusion of rocks and boulders, 35 m × 15 m (115 ft × 49 ft) in length and width, was discovered by Arctic explorer Dennis Schmitt and his team at latitude 83° 42' N and unofficially named 83-42. Whether this land is permanent is uncertain; a 2022 bathymetric survey determined that it was likely not connected to the seafloor but rather rocky material on top of sea ice and thus not land.

=== Climate change ===
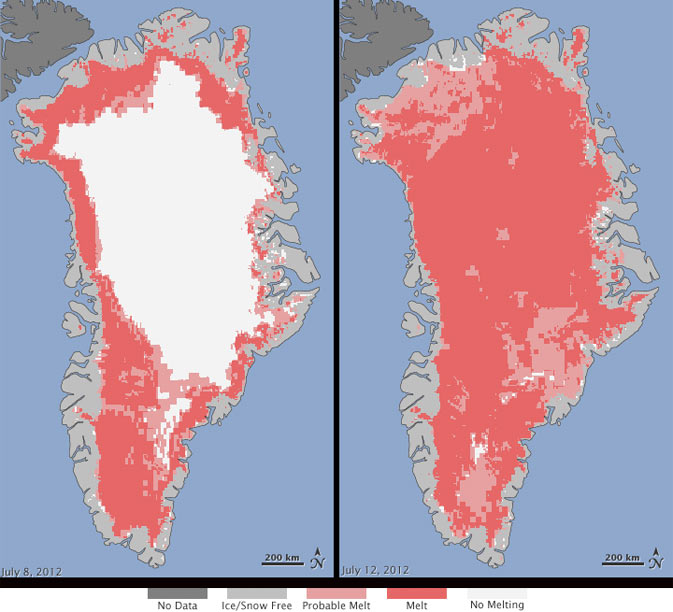
2012 NASA graphics show the extent of a then-record melting event

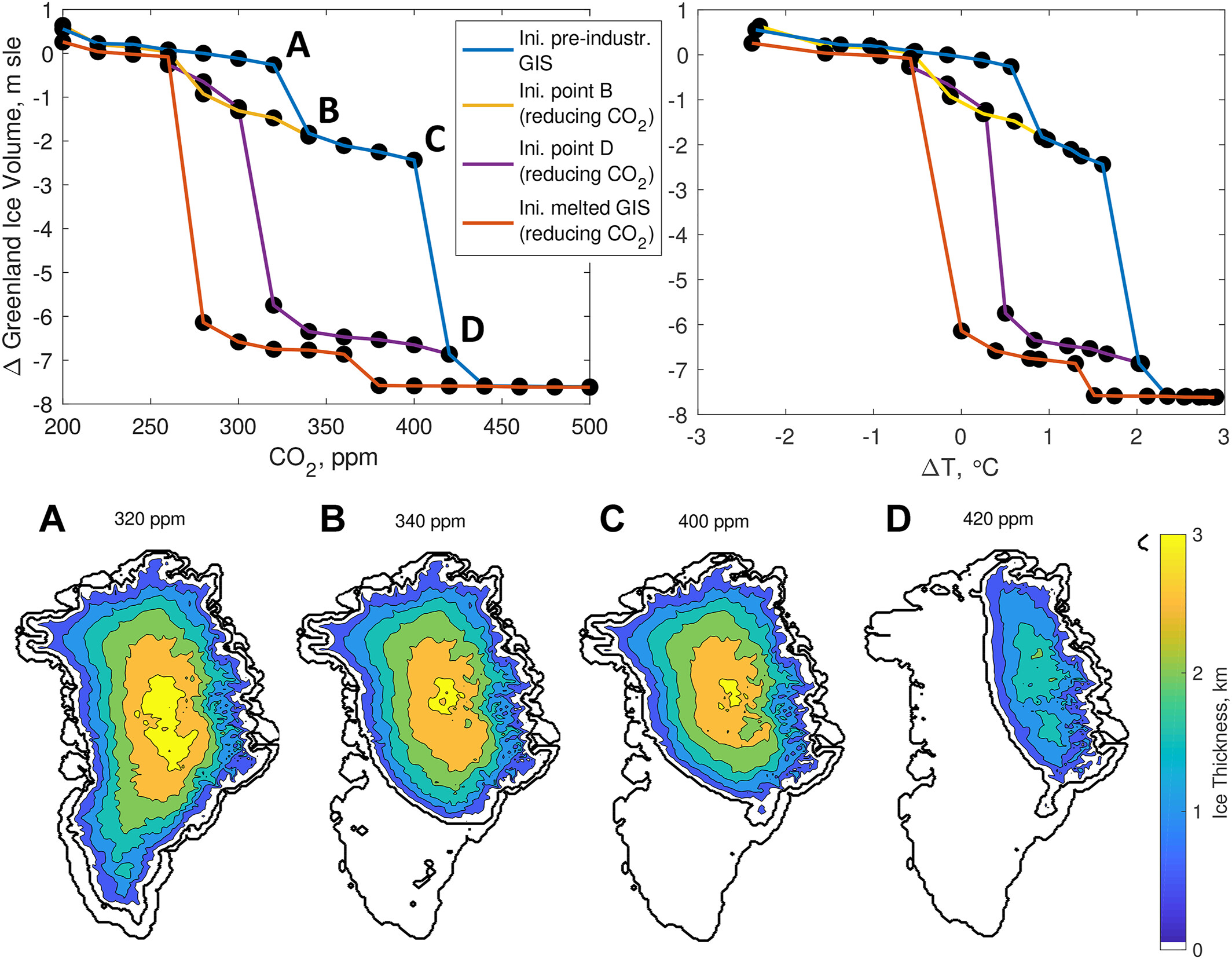
Potential equilibrium states of the ice sheet in response to different equilibrium carbon dioxide concentrations in parts per million, 2023

The mass of Greenland's ice sheet has declined an average 266 billion metric tons per year since 2002.

The Greenland ice sheet continually loses some mass from ice calving at its coasts, but this used to be balanced by the accumulation of snowfall. However, Greenland has been warming since around 1900, and from the 1980s the losses became larger than the gains. After 1996, Greenland has not had a single year when it did not lose ice mass on average. In the 2010s, the Greenland ice sheet melted at its fastest rate for at least the past 12,000 years and it is on track to exceed that later in the 21st century. In 2012, 2019 and 2021, so-called "massive melting events" occurred when practically the entire surface of the ice sheet was melting and no accumulation took place. During the 2021 event, rain fell at Greenland's highest point for the first time in recorded history, an event so unexpected that the research station at the summit had no rain gauges for the occasion.

As with the ice loss elsewhere in the world, the melting contributed and continues to contribute to sea level rise. Between 2012 and 2017, the Greenland melting added an average of 0.68 millimetres (0.027 in) per year, equal to 37% of sea level rise from land ice sources (excluding thermal expansion of water from the continual increase in the ocean heat content). By the end of the 21st century, the melting of Greenland alone is projected to add between ~6 cm (2 1/2 in) if the temperature change is kept below 2 °C (3.6 °F), to around 13 cm (5 in) if the most intense climate change scenario with ever-increasing greenhouse gas emissions is assumed. Under this scenario, the worst case for Greenland melting could reach 33 cm (13 in) of sea level rise equivalent. The large quantities of meltwater also affect the Atlantic meridional overturning circulation by diluting key currents, slowing it down. Due to this input of fresh meltwater, the circulation may even collapse outright with widespread detrimental effects, although research suggests this is likely only if the highest possible warming is sustained for multiple centuries.

Greenland's ice sheet has a volume of ~3,000,000 cubic kilometres (700,000 cu mi). If it were all to melt, global sea level would increase by ~7.5 m (25 ft) from this cause alone. However, research shows that it will take at least 1,000 years for the ice sheet to disappear even with very high rates of global warming, and around 10,000 years under lower rates of warming (which still cross the threshold for the ice sheet's disappearance). This threshold likely lies between 1.7 °C (3.1 °F) and 2.3 °C (4.1 °F). Reducing the warming back to 1.5 °C (2.7 °F) or lower above preindustrial levels (such as through large-scale carbon dioxide removal) would arrest the losses but still cause greater ultimate sea level rise than if the threshold had never been exceeded. Further, 1.5 °C (2.7 °F) appears to commit the Greenland ice sheet to 1.4 m (4 1/2 ft) of sea level rise. A study published in January 2025 in the Proceedings of the National Academy of Sciences reports an "abrupt, coherent, climate-driven transformation" in the states of lakes in Greenland from "blue" (more transparent) to "brown" (less transparent) after a season of both record heat and rainfall drove change in these systems, which may have reached a tipping point . These changes are said to alter "numerous physical, chemical, and biological lake features", and are said to be unprecedented.

In 2007, the existence of a new island was announced. Named Uunartoq Qeqertaq ('warming island'), this land mass was present off the coast of Greenland but was covered by a glacier, and therefore presumed to be a peninsula. This glacier was discovered in 2002 to be shrinking rapidly, and by 2007 it had completely melted away, leaving the exposed island. In 2007, the island was named 'Place of the Year' by the Oxford Atlas of the World. Ben Keene, the atlas's editor, commented:

In the last two or three decades, global warming has reduced the size of glaciers throughout the Arctic and earlier this year, news sources confirmed what climate scientists already knew: water, not rock, lay beneath this ice bridge on the east coast of Greenland. More islets are likely to appear as the sheet of frozen water covering the world's largest island continues to melt.

Some controversy surrounded the history of the island in 2008, specifically over whether the island might have been revealed during a brief warm period in Greenland during the mid-20th century.

=== Geology ===
Greenland was part of the Precambrian continent of Laurentia, the eastern core of which forms the Greenland Shield, while the less exposed coastal strips became a plateau. On these ice-free coastal strips are sediments formed in the Precambrian, overprinted by metamorphism and now formed by glaciers, which continue into the Cenozoic and Mesozoic in parts of the island.

In the east and west of Greenland there are remnants of flood basalts and igneous intrusions, such as the Skaergaard intrusion. Notable rock provinces (metamorphic igneous rocks, ultramafics, and anorthosites) are found on the southwest coast at Qeqertarsuatsiaat. East of Nuuk, the banded iron ore region of Isukasia, over three billion years old, contains the world's oldest rocks, such as greenlandite (a rock composed predominantly of hornblende and hyperthene), formed 3.8 billion years ago, and nuummite. In southern Greenland, the Illimaussaq alkaline complex consists of pegmatites such as nepheline, syenites (especially kakortokite or naujaite) and sodalite (sodalite-foya). In Ivittuut, where cryolite was formerly mined, there are fluoride-bearing pegmatites. To the north of Igaliku, there are the Gardar alkaline pegmatitic intrusions of augite syenite, gabbro, etc.

To the west and southwest are Palaeozoic carbonatite complexes at Kangerlussuaq (Gardiner complex) and Safartoq, and basic and ultrabasic igneous rocks at Uiffaq on Disko Island, where there are masses of heavy native iron up to 25 t (28 short tons) in the basalts. The palaeontology of East Greenland is specially rich, with some of the early tetrapods such as the Acanthostega and Ichthyostega from the Devonian and unique Triassic animals such as the phytosaur Mystriosuchus alleroq and the dinosaurs Issi saaneq and tracks.

=== Biodiversity ===
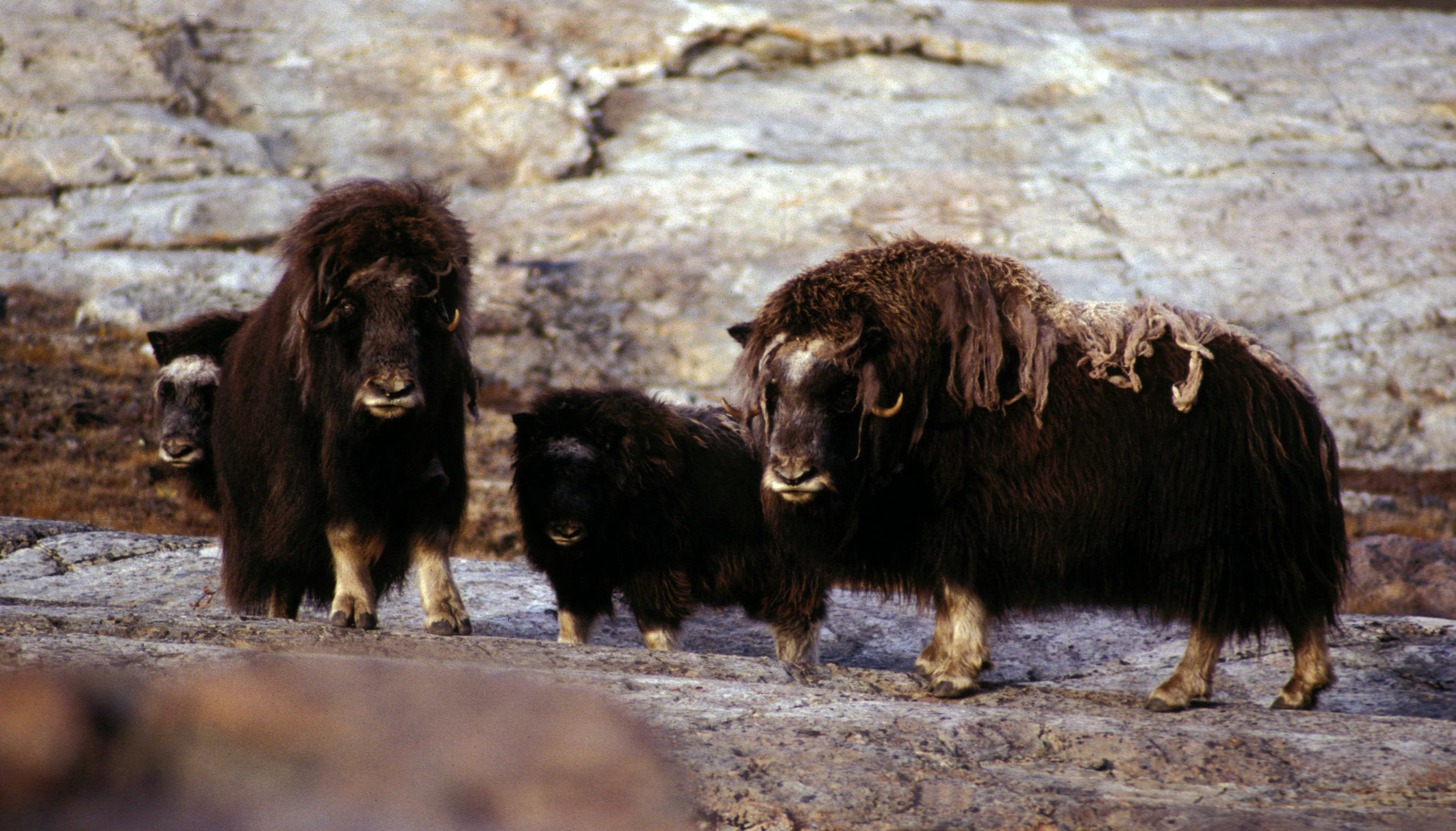
Greenlandic muskoxen at King Oscar Fjord

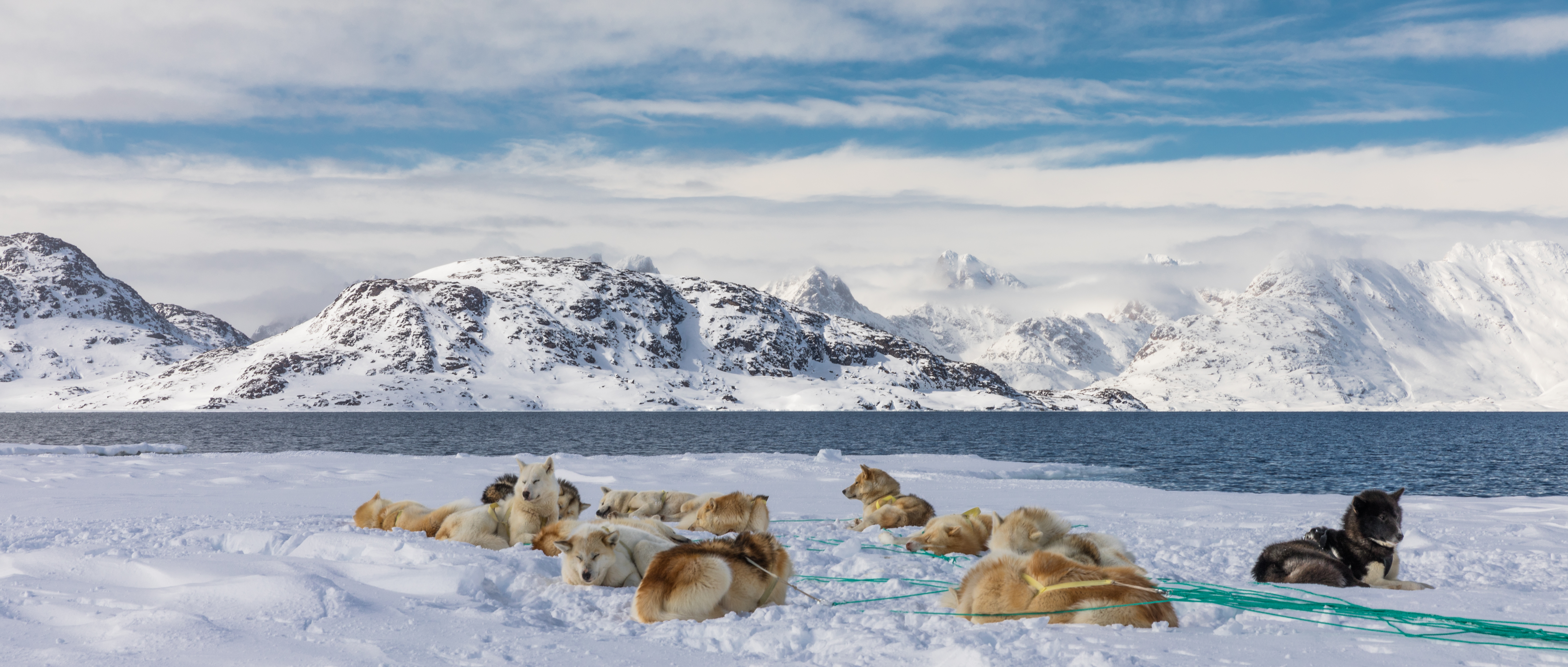
The Greenland Dog was brought from Siberia around 1000 AD.

Greenland is home to two ecoregions: Kalaallit Nunaat high arctic tundra and Kalaallit Nunaat low arctic tundra. There are approximately 700 known species of insects in Greenland, which is low compared with other countries (over one million species have been described worldwide). The sea is rich in fish and invertebrates, especially in the milder West Greenland Current; a large part of the Greenland fauna is associated with marine-based food chains, including large colonies of seabirds. The few native land mammals in Greenland include the polar bear, reindeer (introduced by Europeans), arctic fox, arctic hare, musk ox, collared lemming, ermine, and arctic wolf. The last four are found naturally only in East Greenland, having immigrated from Ellesmere Island. There are dozens of species of seals and whales along the coast. Land fauna consists predominantly of animals which have spread from North America or, in the case of many birds and insects, from Europe. There are no native or free-living reptiles or amphibians on the island.

Phytogeographically, Greenland belongs to the Arctic province of the Circumboreal Region within the Boreal Kingdom. The island is sparsely populated in vegetation; plant life consists mainly of grassland and small shrubs, which are regularly grazed by livestock. The most common tree native to Greenland is the European white birch (Betula pubescens) along with grey-leaf willow (Salix glauca), rowan (Sorbus aucuparia), common juniper (Juniperus communis) and other smaller trees, mainly willows. Greenland's flora consists of about 500 species of "higher" plants, such as flowering plants, ferns, horsetails and lycopodiophyta. Of the other groups, the lichens are the most diverse, with about 950 species; there are 600–700 species of fungi; mosses and bryophytes are also found. Most of Greenland's higher plants have circumpolar or circumboreal distributions; only a dozen species of saxifrage and hawkweed are endemic. A few plant species were introduced by the Norsemen, such as cow vetch.

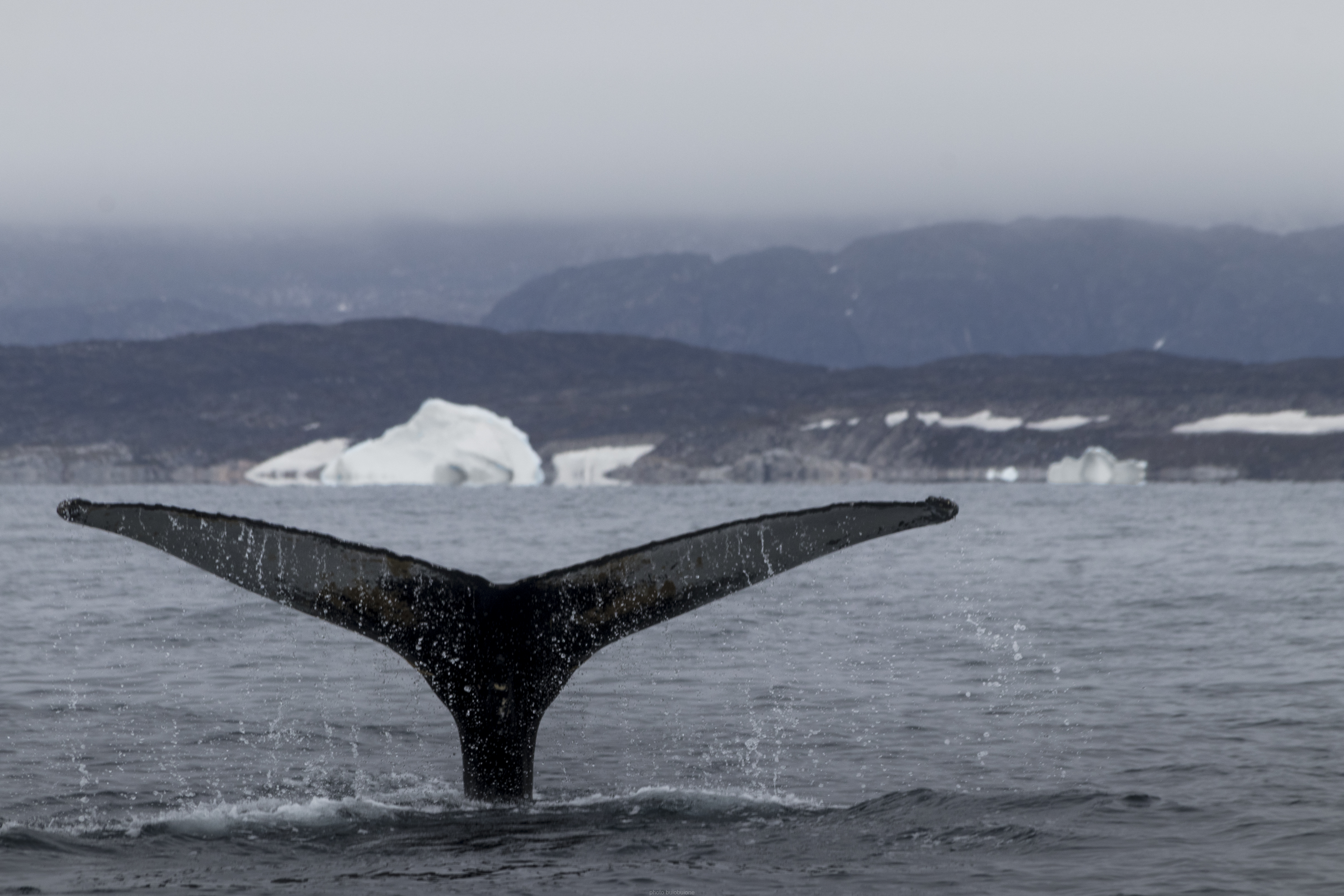
Humpback whale in Disko Bay near Ilulissat (Jacobshavn)

The terrestrial vertebrates of Greenland include the Greenland Dog, which was introduced by the Inuit, as well as European-introduced species such as Greenlandic sheep, goats, cattle, reindeer, horse, chicken and sheepdog, all descendants of animals imported by Europeans. Marine mammals include the hooded seal (Cystophora cristata) as well as the grey seal (Halichoerus grypus). Whales frequently pass very close to Greenland's shores in the late summer and early autumn. Whale species include the beluga whale, blue whale, Greenland whale, fin whale, humpback whale, minke whale, narwhal, pilot whale, sperm whale.

As of 2009, 269 species of fish from over 80 different families are known from the waters surrounding Greenland. Almost all are marine species with only a few in freshwater, such as Atlantic salmon and charr. The fishing industry is the primary industry of Greenland's economy, accounting for the majority of the territory's total exports. Birds, particularly seabirds, are an important part of Greenland's animal life; they consist of both Palearctic and Nearctic species, breeding populations of auks, puffins, skuas, and kittiwakes are found on steep mountainsides. Greenland's ducks and geese include common eider, long-tailed duck, king eider, white-fronted goose, pink-footed goose and barnacle goose. Breeding migratory birds include the snow bunting, lapland bunting, ringed plover, red-throated loon and red-necked phalarope. Non-migratory land birds include the arctic redpoll, ptarmigan, short-eared owl, snowy owl, gyrfalcon and white-tailed eagle.

== Government and politics ==
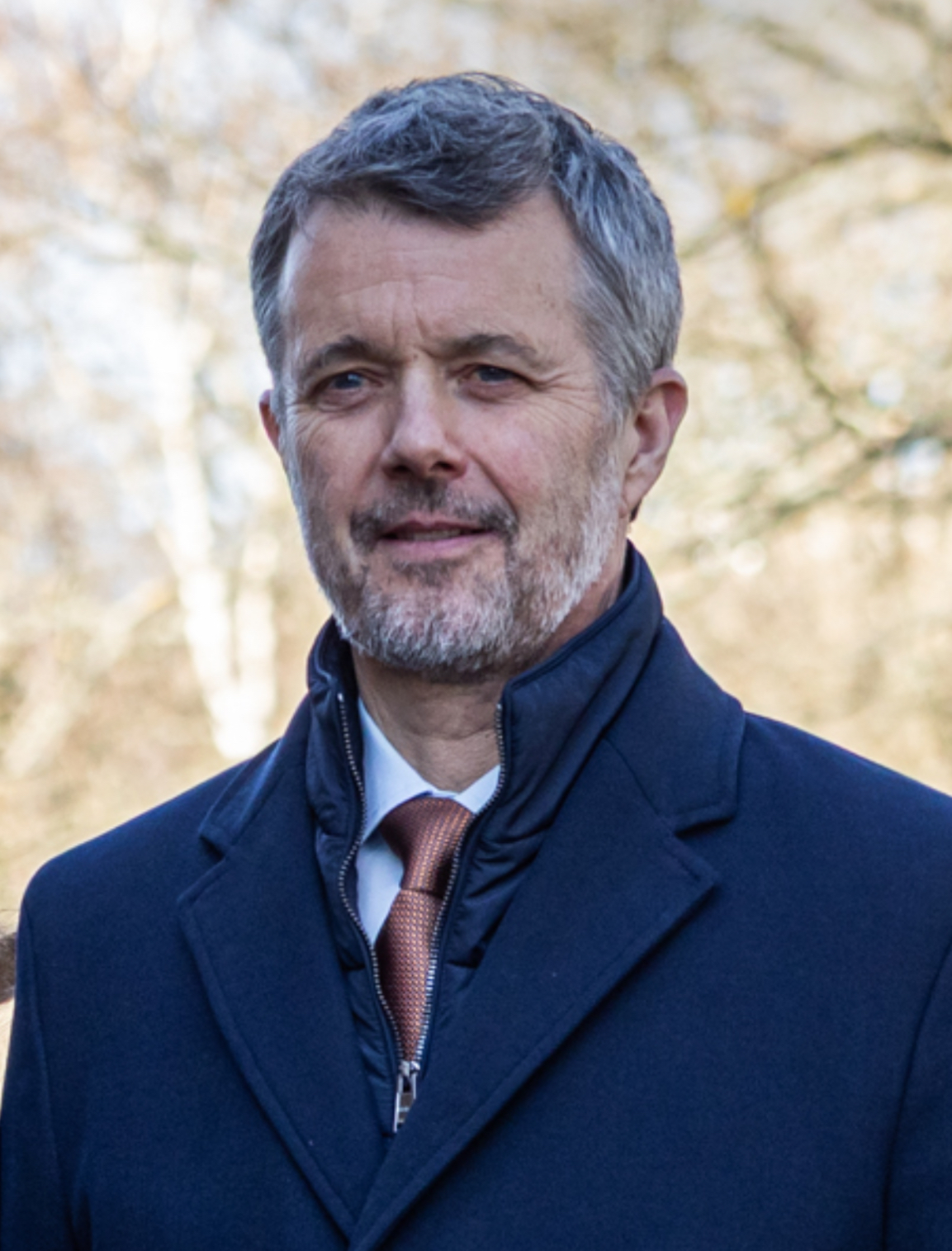
Frederik X, King of Denmark

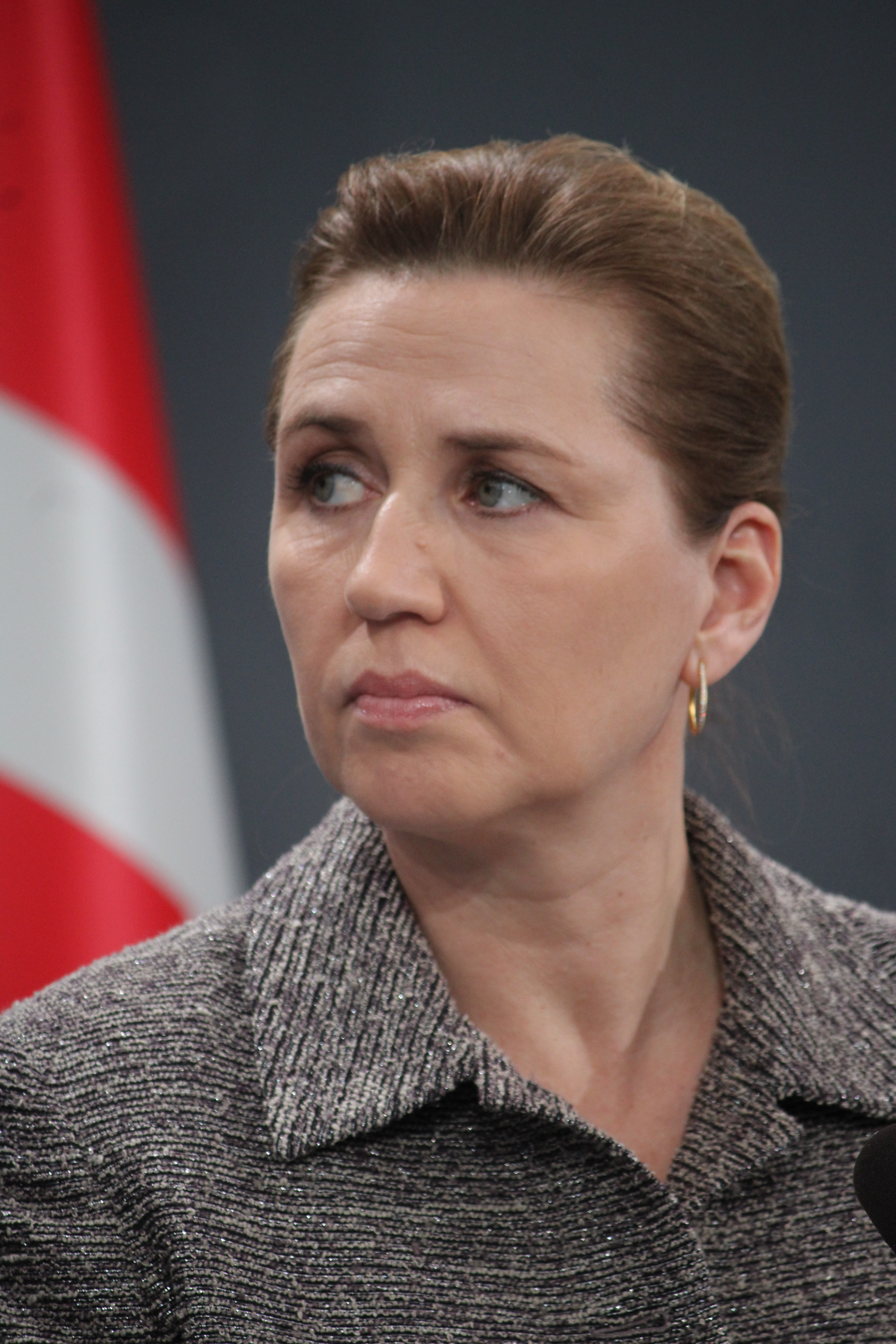
Mette Frederiksen, Prime Minister of Denmark

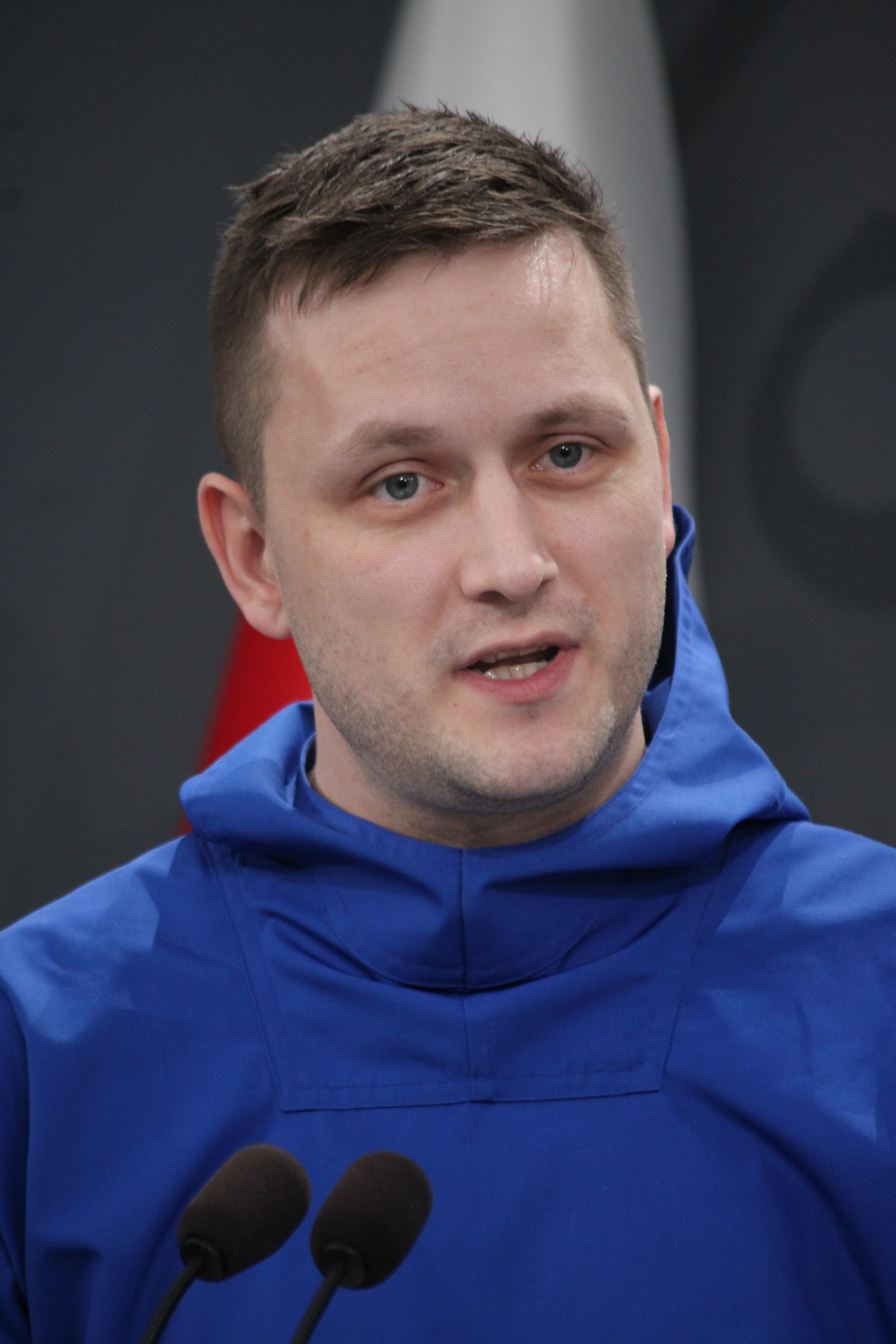
Jens-Frederik Nielsen, Premier of Greenland

The Greenlandic government, Naalakkersuisut, holds executive power in local government affairs. The head of the Greenlandic government is called Naalakkersuisut Siulittaasuat ("Premier"). Any other member of the cabinet is called a Naalakkersuisoq ("Minister"). The Greenlandic parliament is called Inatsisartut ("Legislators"). The parliament currently has 31 members.

In contemporary times, elections are held at municipal, national (inatsisartut), and kingdom (folketing) levels. Greenland is a self-governing entity within the constitutional monarchy of the Kingdom of Denmark, in which King Frederik X is the head of state. The monarch officially retains executive power and presides over the Council of State (privy council). However, following the introduction of a parliamentary system of government, the duties of the monarch have since become strictly representative and ceremonial, such as the formal appointment and dismissal of the prime minister and other ministers in the executive government. The monarch is not answerable for their actions, and the monarch's person is sacrosanct.

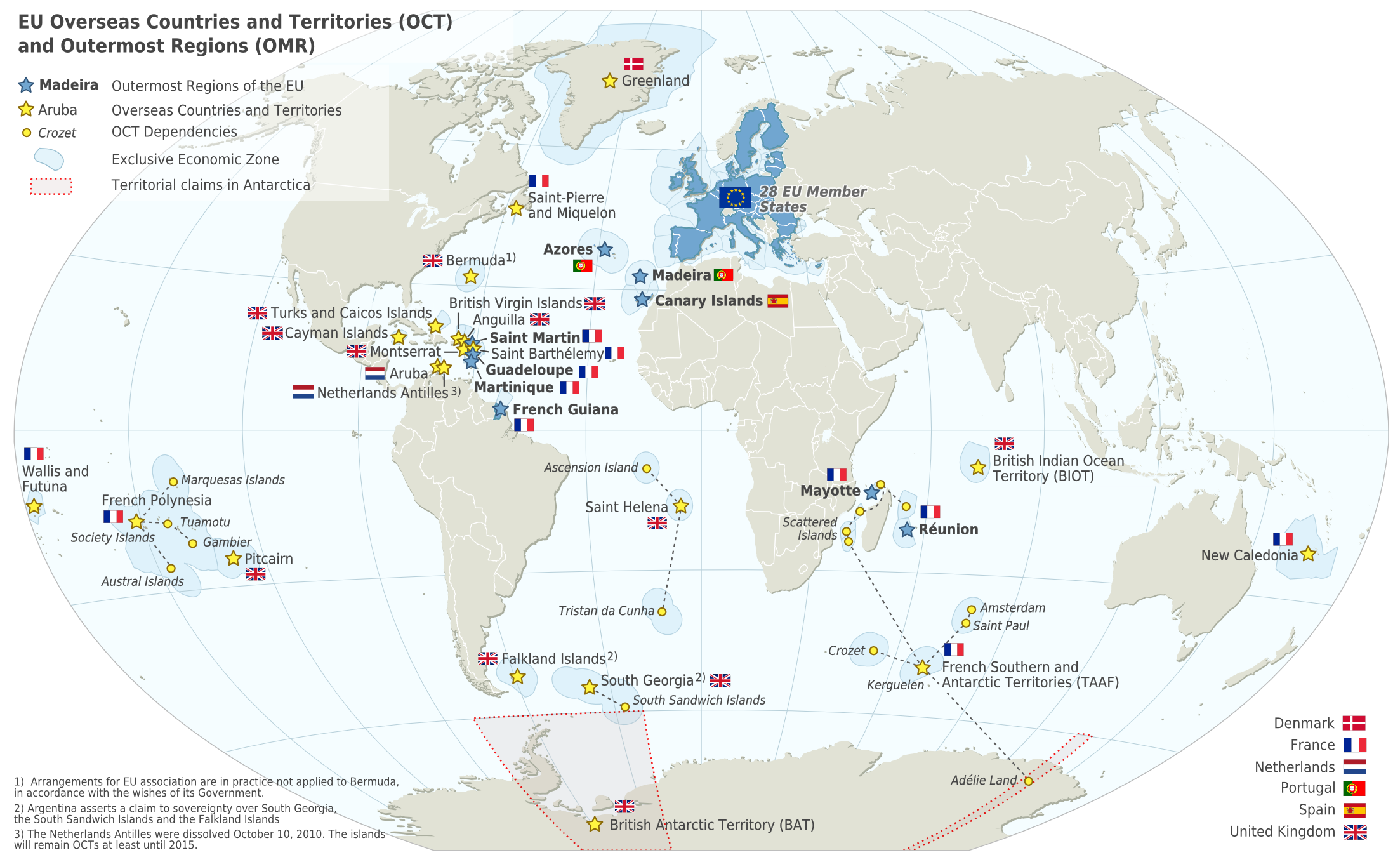
The special territories of the European Union (pre 31 January 2020)

Following World War II, the United Nations mandated that colonies should become independent, enter into free association with another country, or be fully integrated into the metropole (the former colonial power). Denmark opted in 1952 to integrate Greenland into the Danish Realm. In 1979, the Danish government and parliament introduced home rule for Greenland which meant that Naalakkersuisut could assume control over 17 different areas of government. Further devolution of power from Denmark to Greenland came with the "Greenland Self-Government Act" (GSGA) in 2009, that added 33 new areas of government to the pool, the Naalakkersuisut assume control over. The GSGA also resulted from a recognition in Denmark that the people of Greenland had a right to self-determination, and gave a legal section for Naalakkersuisut to trigger an independence process (Section 21, GSGA). Greenland membership in the Council of Europe through Denmark also shows activities at international level, with the last recorded activity in January 2025 concerning a visit from the Committee for the Prevention of Torture.

=== Political system ===
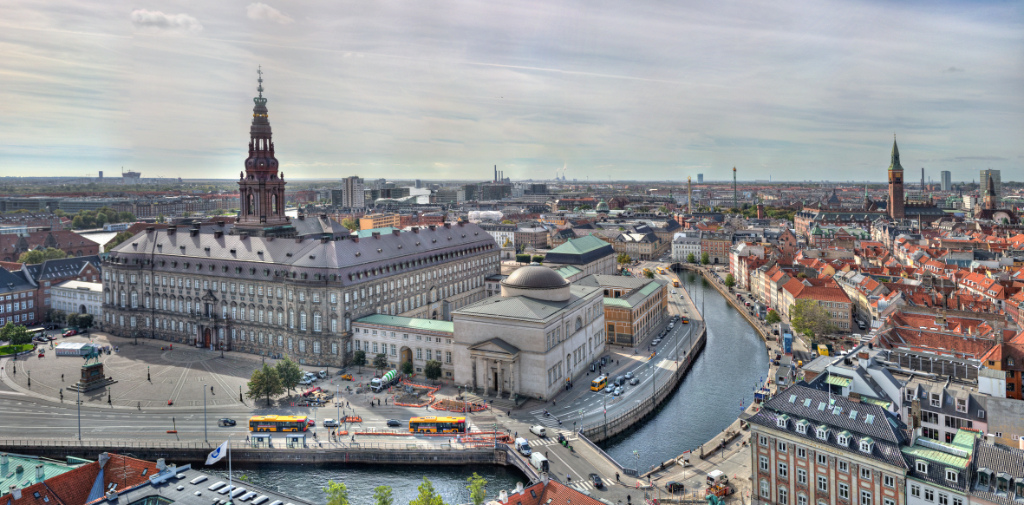
Christiansborg in Copenhagen, seat of the Danish Parliament, from where Greenland's foreign, defence and security policy is decided

The party system was dominated by the social-democratic Siumut and the democratic socialist Inuit Ataqatigiit, both of which broadly have argued for greater independence from Denmark. While the 2009 election saw the unionist Democrats (two MPs) decline greatly, the 2013 election consolidated the power of the two main parties at the expense of the smaller groups, and saw the eco-socialist Inuit Party elected to the Parliament for the first time. The dominance of the Forward and Inuit Community parties began to wane after the snap 2014 and 2018 elections. The non-binding 2008 referendum on self-governance favouring increased self-governance and autonomy was passed winning 76.22% of the vote.

In 1985, Greenland left the European Economic Community (EEC), unlike Denmark, which remained a member. The EEC later became the European Union (EU, renamed and expanded in scope in 1992). Greenland retains some ties through its associated relationship with the EU. However, EU law largely does not apply to Greenland except in the area of trade. Greenland is designated as a member of the Overseas Countries and Territories (OCT) and is thus officially not a part of the EU, though Greenland can and does receive support from the European Development Fund, Multiannual Financial Framework, European Investment Bank and EU programmes.

=== Government ===
Municipalities of Greenland

Greenland's head of state is King Frederik X. The king's government in Denmark appoints a high commissioner (Rigsombudsmand) to represent it on the island. The commissioner is Julie Præst Wilche. The Greenland constituency elects two MP representatives (North Atlantic mandates) to the Kingdom Parliament (Folketinget) in Denmark, out of a total of 179. The current representatives are Aki-Matilda Høegh-Dam of the Naleraq Party and Aaja Chemnitz Larsen of the Inuit Community Party. Greenland has a national Parliament that consists of 31 representatives. The government is the Naalakkersuisut, whose members are appointed by the premier. The premier is the head of government, and is usually the leader of the majority party in Parliament.

=== Administrative divisions ===
Formerly consisting of three counties comprising a total of 18 municipalities, Greenland abolished these in 2009 and has since been divided into large territories known as "municipalities" (Greenlandic: kommuneqarfiit, Danish: kommuner): Sermersooq ("Much Ice") around the capital Nuuk and also including all East Coast communities; Kujalleq ("South") around Cape Farewell; Qeqqata ("Centre") north of the capital along the Davis Strait; Qeqertalik ("The one with islands") surrounding Disko Bay; and Avannaata ("Northern") in the northwest; the latter two having come into being as a result of the Qaasuitsup municipality, one of the original four, being partitioned in 2018. The northeast of the island composes the unincorporated Northeast Greenland National Park. Pituffik Space Base is also unincorporated, an enclave within Avannaata municipality. As a territorial concession granted to the United States in perpetuity, it is administered by the United States Space Force. During its construction, there were as many as 12,000 American residents but in recent years the number has been below 1,000.

=== Military ===
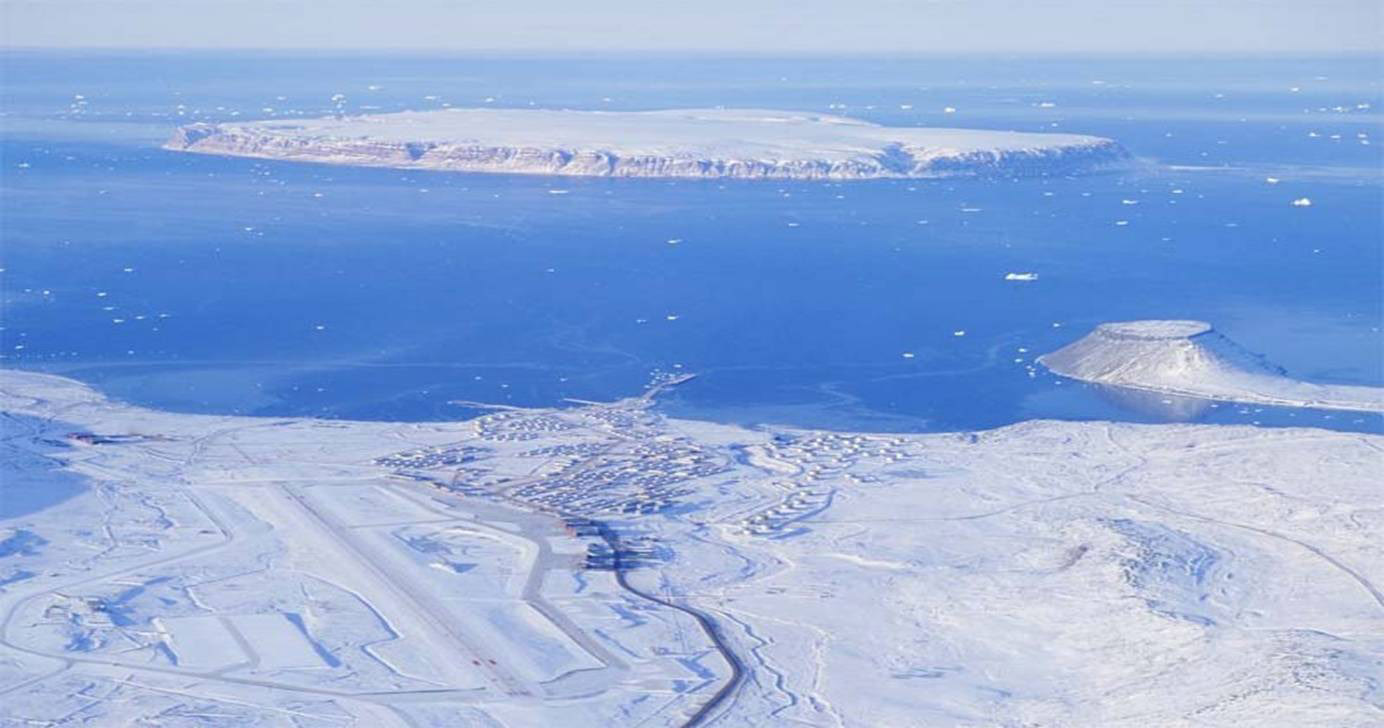
The United States has operated Pituffik Space Base, originally Thule Air Base, since the 1950s.

Greenland does not have its own military. As a territory of Denmark, the Danish military is responsible for Greenland's defence, and the island is within the area overseen by the NATO military alliance. The Joint Arctic Command is the Danish military branch responsible for Greenland. It includes several patrol ships, maritime patrol aircraft, helicopters, and the elite Sirius Dog Sled Patrol. The Danish military has personnel based at Nuuk, Kangerlussuaq, Daneborg, Station Nord, Mestersvig, Grønnedal, and a liaison detachment at Pituffik Space Base. Pituffik is home to the United States Space Force's global network of sensors providing missile warning, space surveillance and space control to North American Aerospace Defence Command (NORAD). Elements of the sensor systems are commanded and controlled variously by Space Deltas 2, 4, and 6. Formerly there had been several US bases in Greenland. The 1951 Greenland Defense Agreement allowed the United States to keep its military bases there, and to establish new bases with the consent of Greenland and Denmark, if deemed necessary by NATO.

In 1995, a political scandal in Denmark occurred after a report revealed the government had given tacit permission for nuclear weapons to be located in Greenland, in contravention of Denmark's 1957 nuclear-free zone policy. The United States built a secret nuclear-powered base, called Camp Century, in the Greenland ice sheet. On 21 January 1968, a B-52G with four nuclear bombs aboard as part of Operation Chrome Dome crashed on the ice of the North Star Bay while attempting an emergency landing. The resulting fire caused extensive radioactive contamination. One of the H-bombs remains lost.

== Economy ==
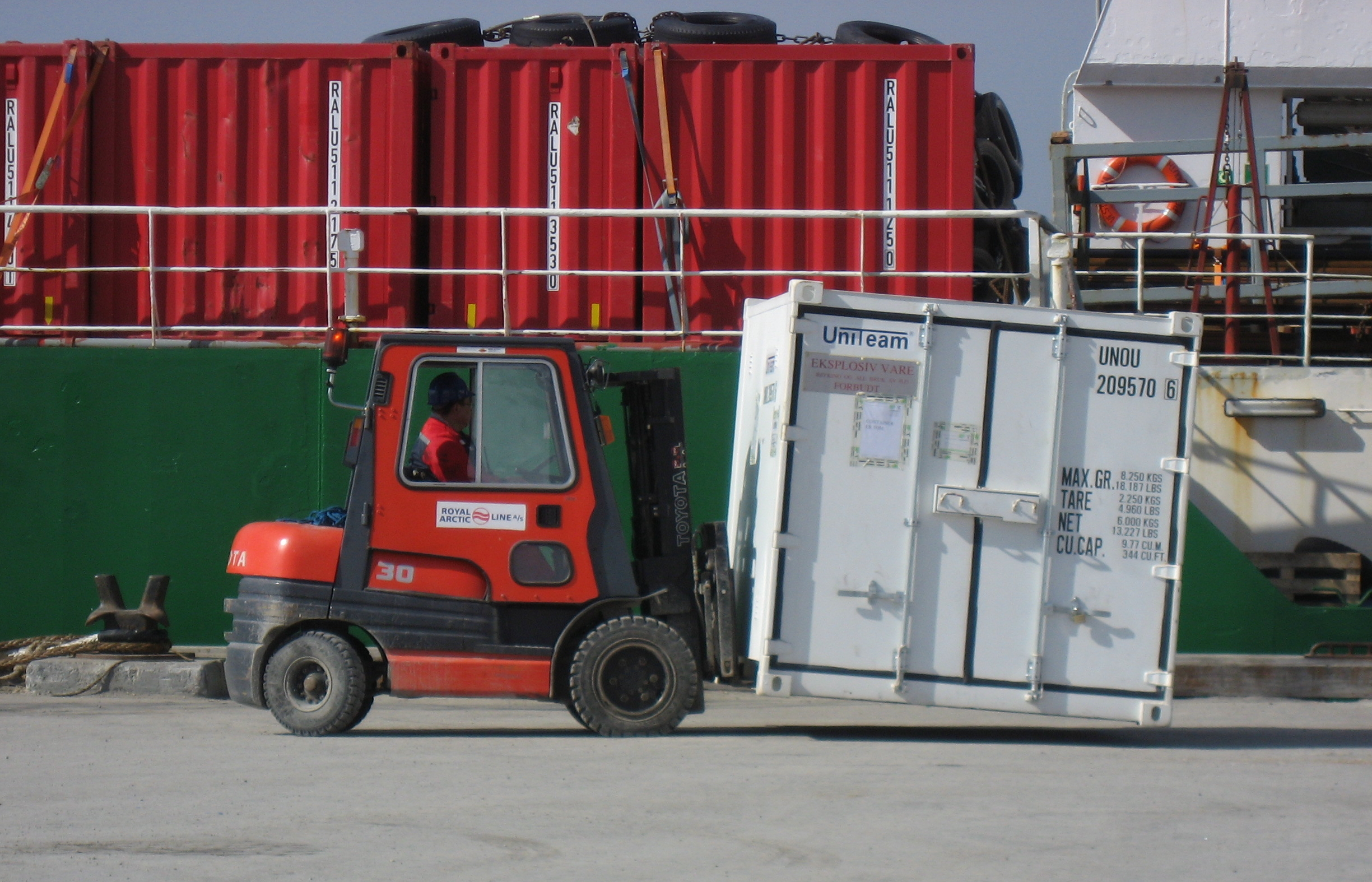
Unloading the supply ship Vestlandia operated by Royal Arctic Line at the port in Upernavik, Greenland (2007)

The single most important factor in the economy is financial aid from Denmark, mainly in the form of the bloktilskud (block grant). In 2024, the bloktilskud was 4.3 billion kr, amounting to a third of the public revenue. On top of this, the Danish state covered the expenses for i.a. judiciary and defence, which together were estimated to amount to over 1 billion kr. For the period from 2019 to 2023 Danish financial aid to Greenland averaged 5.4 billion kr. (€724 million) a year, amounting to more than 20% of the territory's GDP, up from 3.6 billion kr. in 2009.

GDP in 2023 was DKK 22.9 billion, and GDP per capita was DKK 405,000, equivalent to that of the average economies of Europe. The economy performed well in the early 2020s, despite the pandemic, energy crisis and war in Europe. The favourable economic conditions were the result of good conditions for industry and strong infrastructure investments.

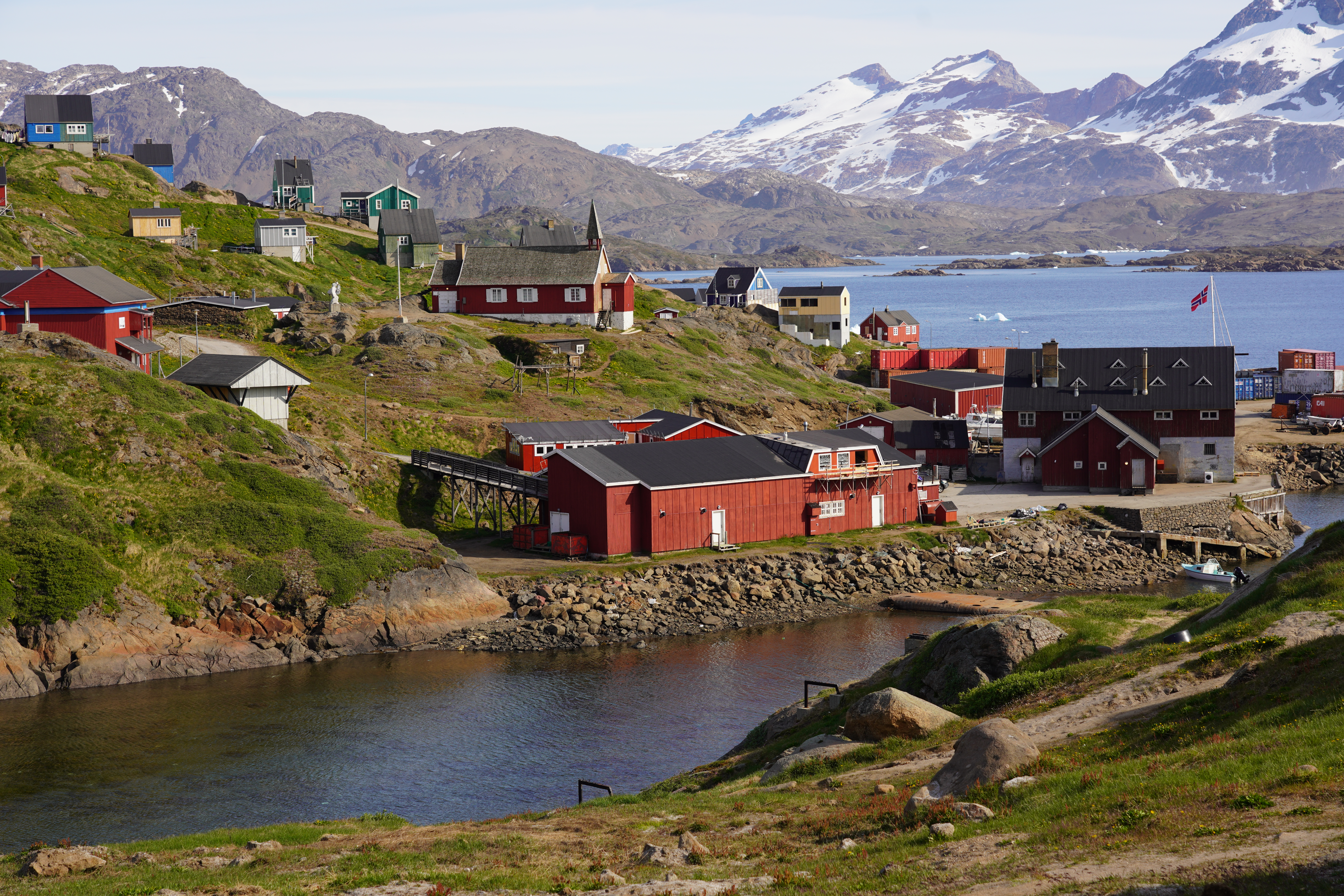
Sermiligaaq, one of more than 60 settlements (Danish: bygder)

The economy is highly dependent on fishing. Fishing accounts for more than 90% of exports. The shrimp and fish industry is by far the largest income earner. Shrimp fishing is quota-regulated based on the Greenland Institute of Natural Resources' (Pinngortitaleriffik) assessment of what constitutes a biologically sustainable level of fishing. Greenland is abundant in minerals, but extraction has been limited. A state company, Nunaoil, was created to help develop the hydrocarbon industry. However, in July 2021, Greenland banned all new oil and gas exploration in its territory after government officials said that the environmental "price of oil extraction is too high".

80% of electricity in Greenland is generated supplied by hydropower, which most larger towns have access to, the largest of which is Buksefjord hydroelectric power plant supplying Nuuk. Smaller villages and towns still rely on oil or diesel power plants, which also supply district heating services. There is major potential hydropower potential in Greenland, including plans to build a large aluminium smelter to create an exportable product. It is expected that much of the labour needed would be imported.

The public sector, including publicly owned enterprises and the municipalities, plays a dominant role in the economy. About half the government revenues come from grants from the Danish government, an important supplement to the GDP. In 2022, the public sector in Greenland incurred expenses of DKK 12.8 billion, while revenue amounted to DKK 13.5 billion.

Greenland suffered an economic contraction in the early 1990s. Since 1993, the economy has improved. The Greenland Home Rule Government (GHRG) has pursued a tight fiscal policy since the late 1980s, which has helped create surpluses in the public budget and low inflation. Since 1990, Greenland has registered a foreign-trade deficit following the closure of the last remaining lead and zinc mine that year.

=== Transport ===
Air transport connects Greenland internally and with other nations. There is scheduled boat traffic, but the long distances lead to long travel times and low frequency. There are virtually no roads between cities because the coast has many fjords that would require ferry service to connect a road network. The only exception is a gravel road of 4.8 km (3 mi) length between Kangilinnguit and the former cryolite mining town of Ivittuut. The lack of agriculture, forestry and similar countryside activities has meant that very few country roads have been built. Greenland has no passenger railways.

A rudimentary dirt road designed primarily for all-terrain vehicles was opened between the towns of Kangerlussuaq and Sisimiut in 2025. There are plans to upgrade the 150 km track to a two-lane gravel road, but funding has not been secured.

There are 13 registered civil airports and 43 helipads; most of them are unpaved and located in rural areas. All civil aviation matters are handled by the Danish Transport Authority and operated by Greenland Airports. Most airports have short runways and can only be served by special fairly small aircraft on fairly short flights. Intercontinental flights connect mainly to Copenhagen or Reykjavík-Keflavík.

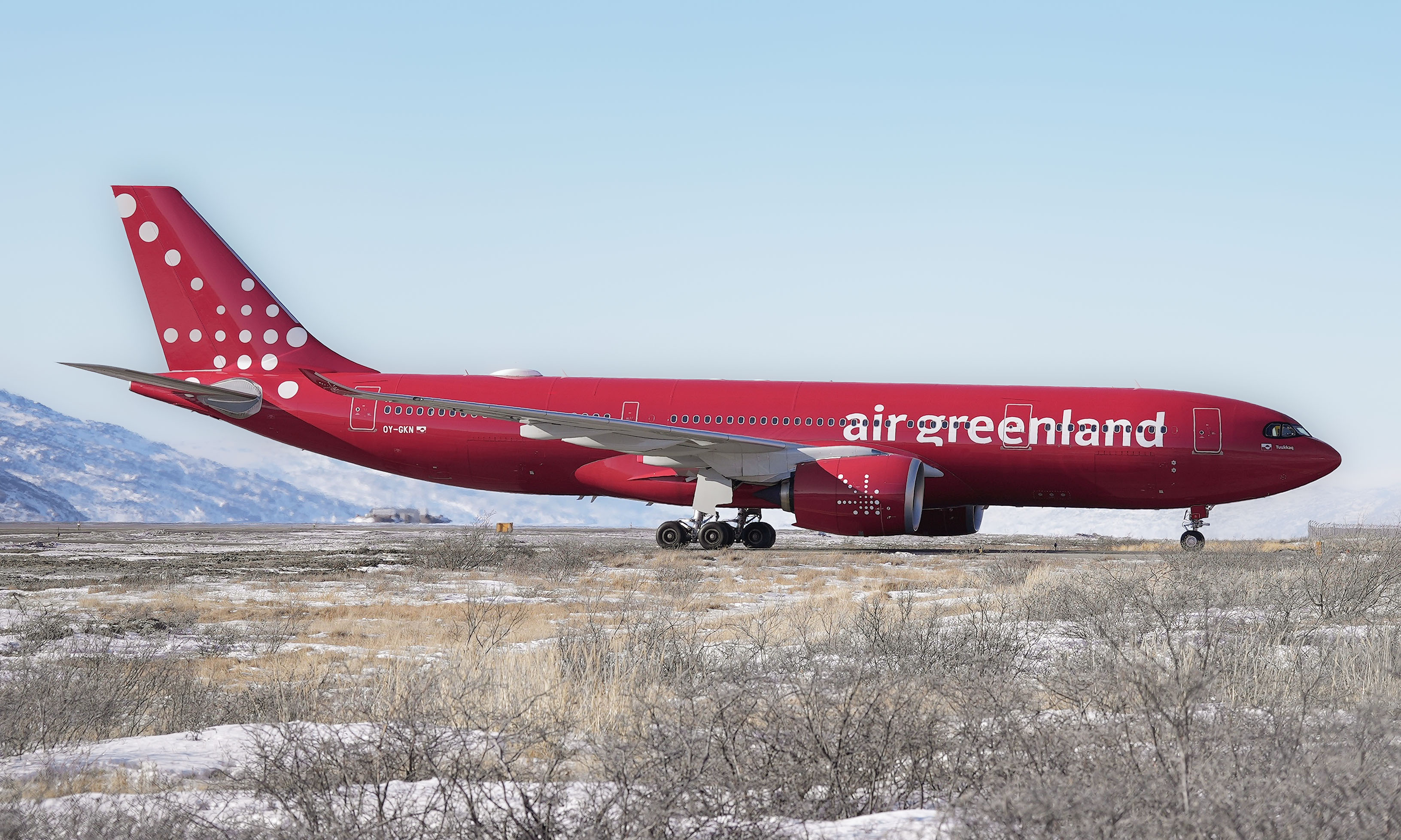
Air Greenland is the flag carrier of Greenland.

Nuuk Airport (GOH) is the hub and international gateway for international and domestic airline passenger transport, after having undergone a major expansion in 2024. Air Greenland is the flag carrier of Greenland. Icelandair provides year-round services to Greenlandic airports. Seasonal and charter flights are offered by other airlines. Prior to the expansion of Nuuk Airport in 2024, Kangerlussuaq Airport (SFJ) was the main international gateway to Greenland, but it is far from the vicinity of the larger towns. Ilulissat Airport (JAV) and Narsarsuaq Airport (UAK) are domestic airports serving limited international flights to Iceland and are both being reconstructed and expanded to enable larger aircraft to serve the airport by 2026, the latter in a new location closer to Qaqortoq.

Sea passenger transport is served by several coastal ferries. Arctic Umiaq Line makes a single round trip per week, taking 80 hours each direction. Cargo freight by sea is handled by the shipping company Royal Arctic Line from, to and across Greenland. It provides trade and transport opportunities between Greenland, Europe, and North America.

=== Tourism ===
Tourism in Greenland increased significantly between 2015 and 2019, with the number of visitors increasing from 77,000 per year to 105,000. One source estimated that in 2019 the revenue from this aspect of the economy was about 450 million kroner (US$67 million). Like many aspects of the economy, this slowed dramatically in 2020 and into 2021, due to restrictions required as a result of the COVID-19 pandemic; one source describes it as being the "biggest economic victim of the coronavirus" (the overall economy did not suffer too severely as of mid-2020, thanks to the fisheries "and a hefty subsidy from Copenhagen"). Greenland's goal for returning tourism is to develop it "right" and to "build a more sustainable tourism for the long run".

=== Mining ===
Greenland is a very difficult place to extract natural resources for a number of reasons, including extreme weather conditions and a strong environmentalist community. The New York Times reported in March 2025 that despite dozens of exploratory projects, there are only two active mines. In January 2025, Danish economics professor Torben M. Andersen assessed that mining would not play a significant role in the economy for at least the next ten years. Despite a legal framework for mining, some ventures and over 30 years of Greenlandic efforts to attract American investment, success has been limited, and the belief in a quick mineral bonanza is increasingly seen as a geopolitical mirage.

Greenland is often portrayed as rich in rare-earth minerals, but experts argue this promise is largely illusory, as mining remains limited due to high costs, lack of infrastructure, and minimal local refining capacity. Although the island does contain resources, similar minerals are more abundant and accessible in other countries like the US, Brazil, Vietnam, and China, making Greenland an uncompetitive option. The EU has urged Greenland to restrict development by the People's Republic of China of rare-earth mineral projects, as China accounts for 95% of the world's current supply. However, in early 2013 the government said that it had no plans to impose such restrictions.

Mining of ruby deposits began in 2007. In 2017, new sources of ruby have been discovered, promising to enhance the gemstone industry in Greenland. Other mineral prospects include iron, uranium, aluminium, nickel, platinum, tungsten, titanium, and copper. The state company Nunamineral has been launched on the Copenhagen Stock Exchange to raise more capital to increase the production of gold, started in 2007.

== Demographics ==
=== Population ===
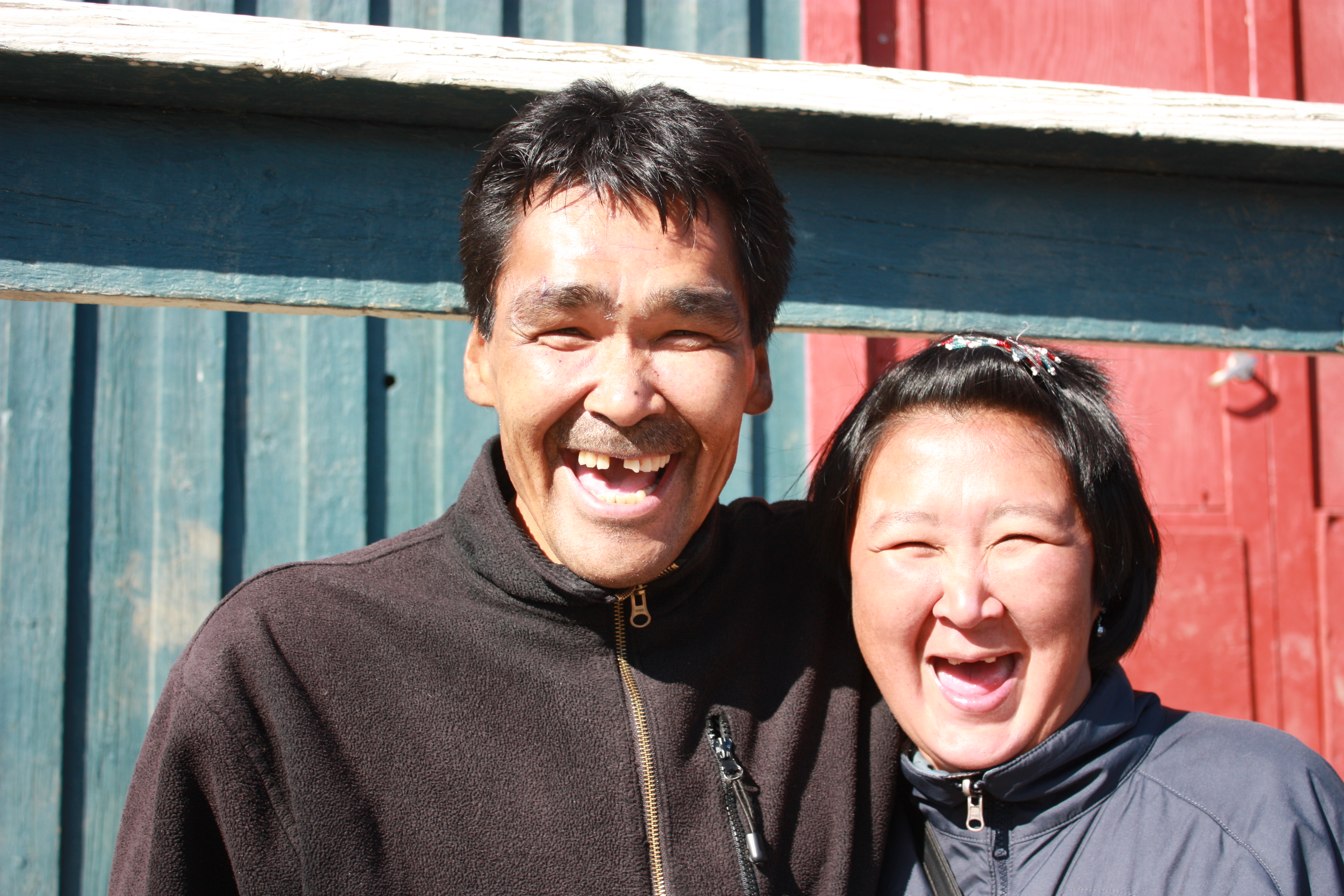
Tunumiit Inuit couple from Kulusuk

In 2025, Greenland had a population of 56,542. Of these, 49,738 people, or 88% of the population, were born in Greenland, while the remaining 6,804 were born outside Greenland. That year, 19,905 people resided in Nuuk. Nearly all Greenlanders live along the fjords in the south-west of the main island, which has a relatively mild climate, especially considering the high latitude upon which it lies. Whereas the majority of the population lives north of 64°N in colder coastal climates, Greenland's warmest climates such as the vegetated area around Narsarsuaq are sparsely populated.

In terms of ethnicity, the population is estimated to be 89.5% Greenlandic Inuit, 7.5% Danish, 1.1% other Nordic and 1.9% other origins. Greenlanders of European ancestry include people of Danish, Norwegian and to a lesser degree of Faroese, Icelandic, Dutch (whalers), German and American descent.

Each year, Statistics Greenland publishes the number of Greenlanders living in Denmark. This includes all persons who were born in Greenland. In 2023, this number amounted to 17,079 people. A 2015 wide genetic study of Greenlanders found modern-day Inuit in Greenland are direct descendants of the first Inuit pioneers of the Thule culture who arrived in the 13th century, with approximately 25% admixture of the European colonizers from the 16th century. Despite previous speculations, no evidence of Viking settlers predecessors has been found.

Largest cities or towns in Greenland as of 1 January 2025
| Rank | Name | Municipality | Pop. | Rank | Name | Municipality | Pop. |
|---|---|---|---|---|---|---|---|
| 1 | Nuuk | Sermersooq | 19,905 | 11 | Nanortalik | Kujalleq | 1,084 |
| 2 | Sisimiut | Qeqqata | 5,485 | 12 | Upernavik | Avannaata | 1,067 |
| 3 | Ilulissat | Avannaata | 5,087 | 13 | Qasigiannguit | Qeqertalik | 961 |
| 4 | Qaqortoq | Kujalleq | 3,069 | 14 | Qeqertarsuaq | Qeqertalik | 799 |
| 5 | Aasiaat | Qeqertalik | 2,992 | 15 | Qaanaaq | Avannaata | 599 |
| 6 | Maniitsoq | Qeqqata | 2,519 | 16 | Kangaatsiaq | Qeqertalik | 481 |
| 7 | Tasiilaq | Sermersooq | 1,758 | 17 | Kullorsuaq | Avannaata | 444 |
| 8 | Uummannaq | Avannaata | 1,401 | 18 | Kangerlussuaq | Qeqqata | 440 |
| 9 | Narsaq | Kujalleq | 1,258 | 19 | Ittoqqortoormiit | Sermersooq | 325 |
| 10 | Paamiut | Sermersooq | 1,169 | 20 | Kangaamiut | Qeqqata | 295 |

=== Languages ===
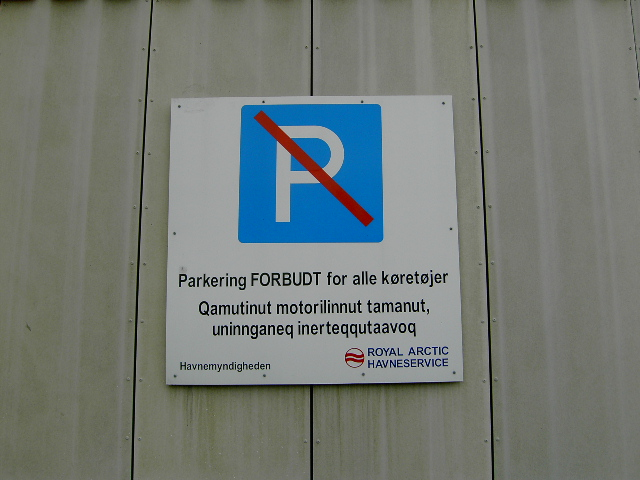
A bilingual parking sign in Nuuk in Danish and Greenlandic

Greenlandic (effectively West Greenlandic), spoken by nearly 50,000 people, became the sole official language in 2009. The majority of the population speak both Danish and West Greenlandic Kalaallisut (the most populous Eskaleut language). They have been used in public affairs since the establishment of home rule in 1979. In practice, Danish is still widely used in administration, academia, and skilled trades and other professions. The orthography of Greenlandic, established in 1851, was revised in 1973. The literacy rate was 100% in 2007.

About 12% of the population speak Danish as their primary language. These are primarily Danish immigrants, many of whom speak Danish as their first and sometimes only language. Monolingual Danish speakers are concentrated in Nuuk and other larger towns. A debate about the roles of Greenlandic and Danish in the country's future is ongoing. While Greenlandic was dominant in all smaller settlements, most of the multi-ethnic Inuit ancestors spoke Danish as a second language. In larger towns, especially Nuuk, Danish was more important for social matters. English is growing in importance, and is now taught from the first school year.

West Greenland has long been the most populous area of the island, and this has contributed to its variety of Greenlandic, Kalaallisut, becoming the de facto official language of Greenland. Around 3,000 people speak East Greenlandic (Tunumiisut) and nearly 1,000 around northern Qaanaaq speak Inuktun. North Greenlandic is closer to the Inuit languages of Canada than it is to other Greenlandic. Each of these varieties is nearly unintelligible to the speakers of the others and some linguists consider Tunumiisut to be a separate language altogether. A UNESCO report labelled the other varieties as endangered, and measures are now considered to protect the East Greenlandic dialect.

=== Religion ===
Religion in Greenland (2010):
1. Protestantism (95.5%)
2. Roman Catholicism (0.20%)
3. Other Christian (0.40%)
4. Inuit religion (0.80%)
5. Agnostic (2.30%)
6. Atheist (0.20%)
7. Other religion (0.60%)

The nomadic Inuit were traditionally shamanistic, with a well-developed Inuit religion primarily concerned with appeasing a vengeful and fingerless sea goddess called Sedna who controlled the success of the seal and whale hunts. The first Norse colonists worshipped the Norse gods, but Leif Erikson was converted to Christianity by King Olaf Trygvesson on a trip to Norway in 999 and sent missionaries back to Greenland. These swiftly established 16 parishes, some monasteries, and a bishopric at Garðar.

Rediscovering these colonists and spreading ideas of the Protestant Reformation among them was one of the primary reasons for the Danish recolonization in the 18th century. Under the patronage of the Royal Mission College in Copenhagen, Norwegian and Danish Lutherans and German Moravian missionaries searched for the missing Norse settlements, but no Norse were found, and instead they began preaching to the Inuit. The principal figures in the Christianization of Greenland were Hans and Poul Egede and Matthias Stach. The New Testament was translated piecemeal from the time of the first settlement on Kangeq Island, but the first translation of the whole Bible was not completed until 1900. An improved translation using the modern orthography was completed in 2000.

The majority of the population is Protestant Christianity, represented mainly by the Church of Denmark, which is Lutheran in orientation. The historically important Moravian Brothers (Herrnhuters) were a congregation of faith, in a Danish context based in Christiansfeld in South Jutland, and partially of German origin, but their name does not signify they were ethnic Moravians (Czechs). There are no official census data on religion in Greenland, but the Bishop of Greenland Sofie Petersen estimates that 85% of the Greenlandic population are members of her congregation. The Church of Denmark is the established church through the Constitution of Denmark. In 2025, 91% of Greenland's population are members of the church. This applied to 96% of the population born in Greenland, and to 53% of immigrants. A small Roman Catholic minority is pastorally served by the Roman Catholic Diocese of Copenhagen. There are still Christian missionaries on the island, but mainly from charismatic movements proselytising fellow Christians. A small Muslim community exists in Greenland but has no formal mosque or religious buildings.

=== Education ===
Education is organized in a similar way to Denmark. Students have 10 years of mandatory primary school. This is followed by secondary education, focused on either work training or preparation for university education. There is one institution of higher learning, the University of Greenland (Greenlandic: Ilisimatusarfik) in Nuuk. Many Greenlanders attend universities in Denmark or elsewhere.

The public school system is, as in Denmark, under the jurisdiction of the municipalities. The legislature specifies the standards allowed for the content in schools, but the municipal governments decide how the schools under their responsibility are run. Education is free and compulsory for children aged seven to 16. The financial outlay devoted to education is 11.3% of GDP. Section 1 of the Government Ordinance on Public Schools (amended in 1997) requires Greenlandic as the language of instruction.

Education is governed by a regulation adopted in 1990 and amended in 1993 and 1994. Under this legislation, linguistic integration in primary and lower secondary schools became compulsory for all students. The aim is to place Greenlandic-speaking and Danish-speaking pupils in the same classes, whereas previously they were placed in separate classes according to their mother tongue. At the same time, the government guarantees that Danish speakers can learn Greenlandic. In this way, the Greenlandic government wants to give the same linguistic, cultural and social education to all students, both those of Greenlandic and Danish origin. A study, which was carried out during a three-year trial period, concluded that this bilingualism had achieved positive results.

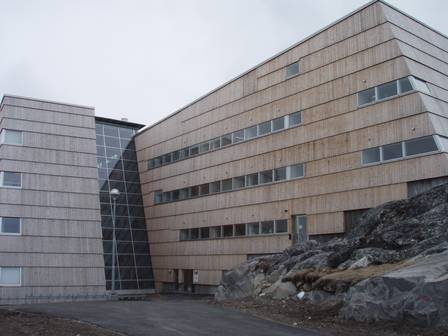
The Ilimmarfik (University of Greenland) campus is in Nuuk.

About 100 schools exist, in which both Greenlandic and Danish are used. Generally, Greenlandic is taught from kindergarten to the end of secondary school, but Danish is compulsory from the first cycle of primary school as a second language. As in Denmark with Danish, the school system provides for "Greenlandic 1" and "Greenlandic 2" courses. Language tests allow students to move from one level to the other. Based on the teachers' evaluation of their students, a third level of courses has been added: "Greenlandic 3". Secondary education in Greenland is generally vocational and technical. The system is governed by Regulation No. 16 of 28 October 1993 on Vocational and Technical Education, Scholarships and Career Guidance. Danish remains the main language of instruction. Nuuk has a bilingual teacher training college and a bilingual university. At the end of their studies, all students must pass a test in the Greenlandic language.

Higher education is offered in Greenland: university education, training of journalists, training of primary and lower secondary school teachers, training of social workers, training of social educators and training of nurses and nursing assistants. Greenlandic students can continue their education in Denmark, if they wish and have the financial means to do so. For admission to Danish educational institutions, Greenlandic applicants are placed on an equal footing with Danish applicants. Scholarships are granted to Greenlandic students who are admitted to Danish educational institutions. To be eligible for these scholarships, the applicant must be a Danish citizen and have had permanent residence in Greenland for at least five years. The total period of residence outside Greenland may not exceed three years.

=== Social issues ===
The rate of suicide in Greenland is very high. According to a 2010 census, Greenland holds the highest suicide rate in the world. In 2021, a study reported that there were 45 suicides, corresponding to a rate of 81 per 100,000 inhabitants annually. This was approximately eight times higher than in Denmark. Another significant social issue is a high rate of alcoholism. The rate of alcohol consumption peaked in the 1980s, when it was twice as high as in Denmark; by 2010 it had fallen slightly below that of Denmark. Alcohol prices are far higher in Greenland than in Denmark, meaning that consumption has a large socio-economic impact. The prevalence of HIV/AIDS has been high, reaching a peak in the 1990s when the number of AIDS-related deaths was also relatively high. Through a number of initiatives, the prevalence (along with the death rate, through efficient treatment) has fallen and is now low, about 0.13% in the 2010s, below that of most other countries. In recent decades, unemployment has generally been somewhat above that of Denmark; in 2017, the rate was 6.8% in Greenland, compared to 5.6% in Denmark.

==== Postwar urbanisation and resettlement ====
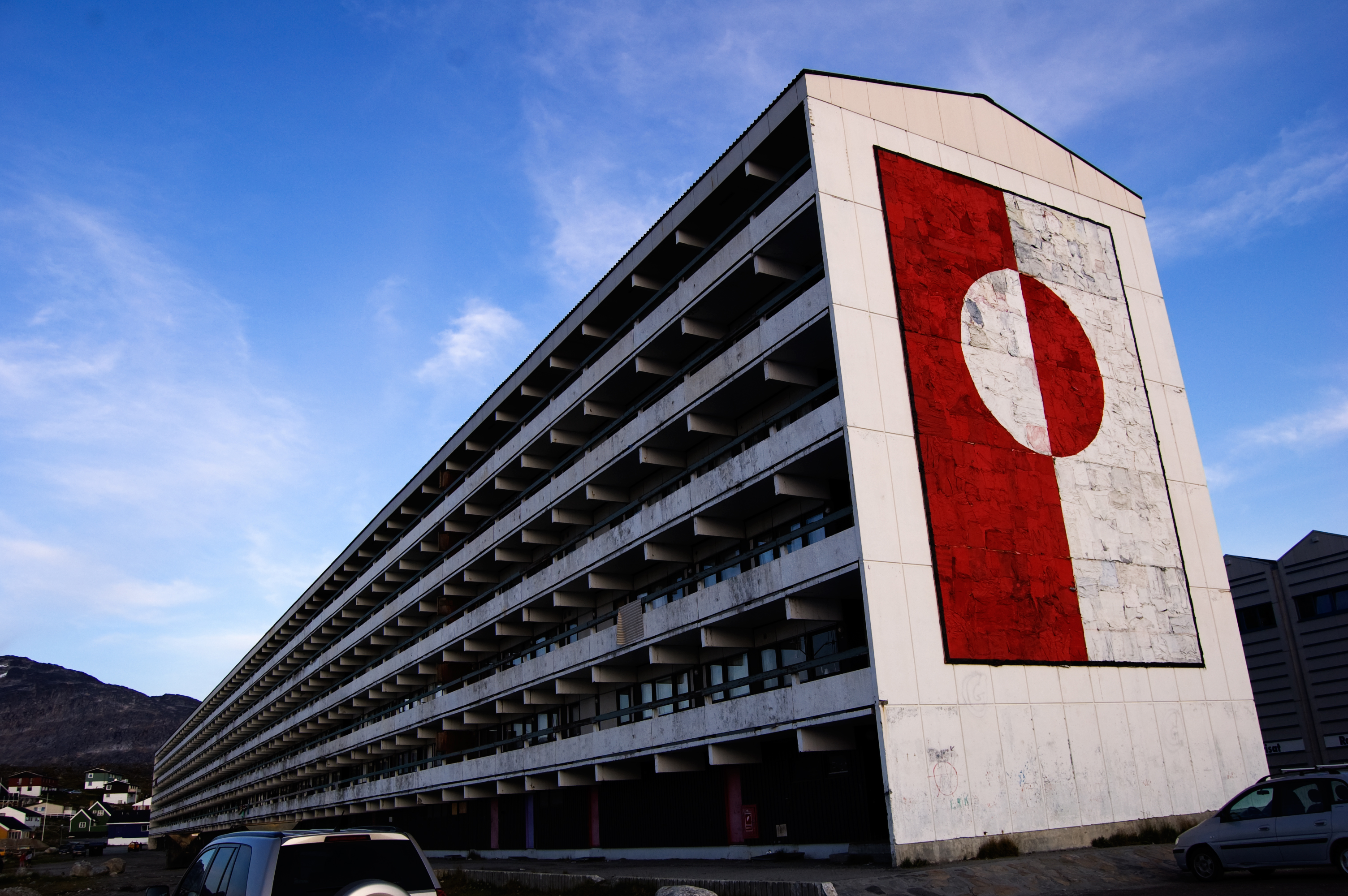
Blok P, a residential building in Nuuk constructed during a period of Danish-led urbanisation in Greenland

Postwar urbanisation in Greenland was shaped by the Danish government's G50 and G60 reforms, which concentrated investment and public services in selected towns. Families were encouraged to relocate with promises of housing and employment, while some communities were closed or had investment withheld. Between 1952 and 1963, approximately 3,000 households were moved from smaller coastal settlements to growing towns. Academic studies have linked these centralisation and housing policies to cultural alienation, social marginalisation, housing insecurity and homelessness. Blok P in Nuuk is often cited as an example of failed Danish housing policy and colonial power, and the social problems it represented remained after its demolition.

==== Compulsory contraception of Inuit women ====
In the 1960s and 1970s, at a time when the population was increasing, 4,500 Greenland Inuit women and girls (roughly half of all fertile females) were fitted with intrauterine devices (IUDs) by Danish doctors. Sometimes girls (as young as 12) were taken directly from school to have these devices inserted, without their parents' permission. The procedure was also carried out on some Inuit girls at boarding schools in Denmark. As a result, over eight years' time, from 1966 to 1974, fertility rates in Greenland fell from 7 to 2.3 children per woman, the fastest fertility transition on record in human history.

In 2022 Danish Health Minister Magnus Heunicke announced an investigation into the decisions leading to the practice and its implementation. Greenlandic doctors also carried out the same illegal procedures on several Inuit women after Greenland took control of its health care system in 1991.

==== LGBTQ rights ====
LGBTQ rights in Greenland are some of the most extensive in the world, relatively similar to those in Denmark. Transgender people may change the gender designation on their official identity documents. A law passed in 2016 by decree allows legal gender changes based on self-determination. Since 2010, Greenland has had laws prohibiting hate speech against LGBTQ+ persons. Parliament passed a Law on Equal Treatment and Anti-Discrimination in 2024, which prohibits all discrimination on the basis of "sexual orientation, gender identity, gender expression, [and] gender characteristics", among other characteristics. The law also creates an Equal Treatment Board to manage discrimination complaints and an Equality Council to promote non-discrimination.

== Culture ==
Greenlandic culture is a blending of traditional Inuit (Kalaallit, Tunumiit, Inughuit) and Scandinavian culture. Inuit, or Kalaallit, culture has a strong artistic tradition, dating back thousands of years. The Kalaallit are known for an art form of figures called tupilak or a "spirit object". Traditional art-making practices thrive in the Ammassalik. Sperm whale ivory remains a valued medium for carving.

=== Fine arts ===
The Inuit have their own arts and crafts tradition; for example, they carve tupilaks, sculptures of figures of avenging monsters practised within shaman traditions. This Kalaallisut word means soul or spirit of a deceased person and describes an artistic figure, usually no more than 20 centimetres (8 in) tall, carved mainly from walrus ivory, with a variety of unusual shapes. This sculpture actually represents a mythical or spiritual being; usually, however, it has become a mere collector's item because of its grotesque appearance for Western visual habits. Modern artisans still use indigenous materials such as musk ox and sheep wool, seal fur, shells, soapstone, reindeer antlers or gemstones.

The history of Greenlandic painting began with Aron von Kangeq, who depicted the old Greenlandic sagas and myths in his drawings and watercolours in the mid-19th century. In the 20th century, landscape and animal painting developed, as well as printmaking and book illustrations with sometimes expressive colouring. It was mainly through their landscape paintings that Kiistat Lund and Buuti Pedersen became known abroad. Anne-Birthe Hove chose themes from Greenlandic social life. There is a museum of fine arts in Nuuk, the Nuuk Art Museum.

=== Media ===
Kalaallit Nunaata Radioa (KNR) is the public broadcasting company of Greenland. It is an associate member of the Eurovision and Nordvision networks. Nearly a hundred people are directly employed by the company, which is one of the largest in the territory. Nuuk has its own radio and television station. The television channel Nanoq Media, created in 2002, is the largest local television station in Greenland, reaching more than 4,000 households as receiving members, which corresponds to about 75% of all households in Nuuk.

Two newspapers are published in Greenland, both of which are distributed nationally. The weekly Sermitsiaq is published every Friday, while the online version is updated several times a day. It is named after the mountain Sermitsiaq, located about 15 km (9.5 mi) northeast of Nuuk, and was distributed only in Nuuk until the 1980s. The bi-weekly Atuagagdliutit/Grønlandsposten is published every Tuesday and Thursday, in Greenlandic as Atuagagdliutit and in Danish as Grønlandsposten, with all articles published in both languages.

=== Music ===
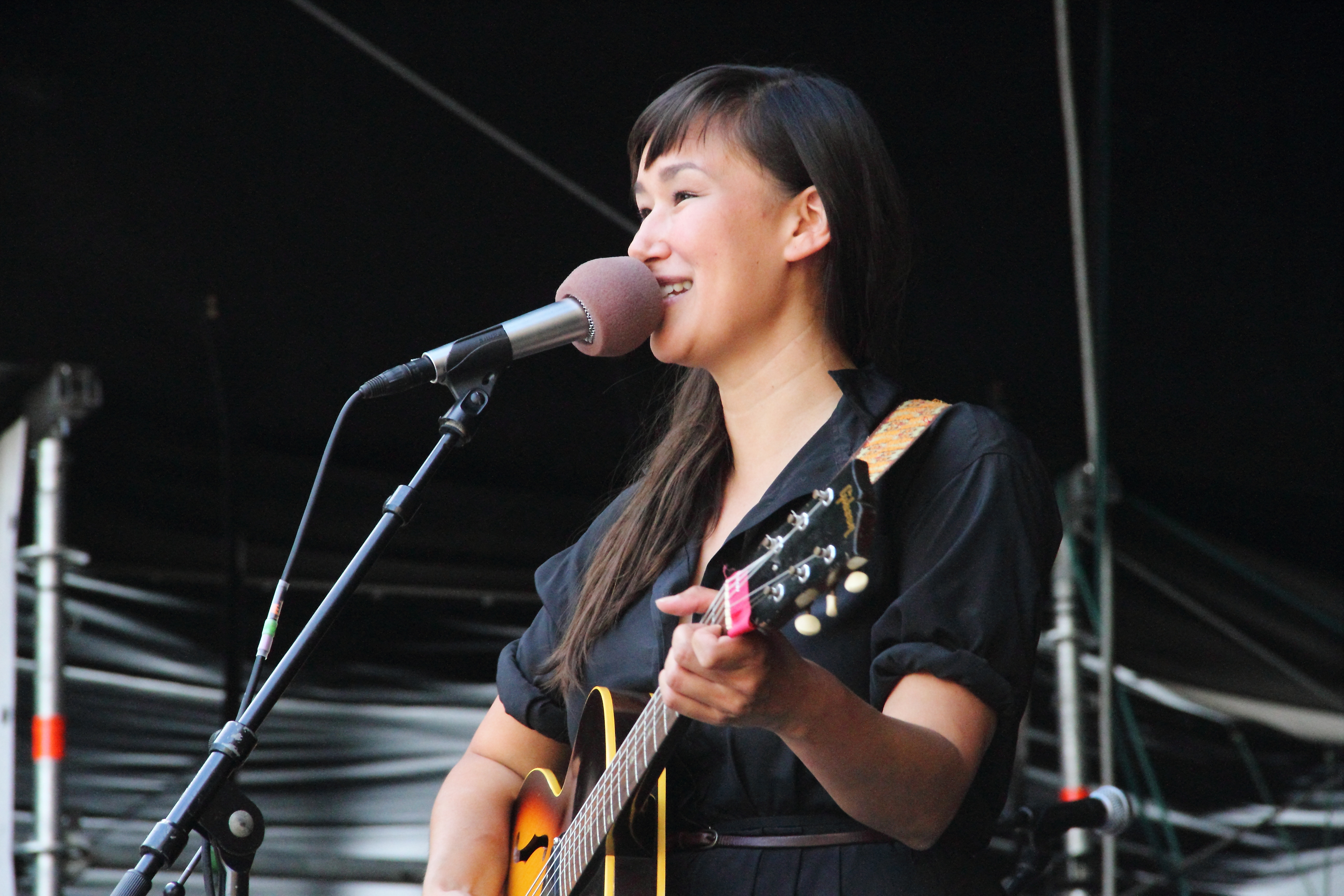
Nive Nielsen in 2016, Greenlandic singer and songwriter

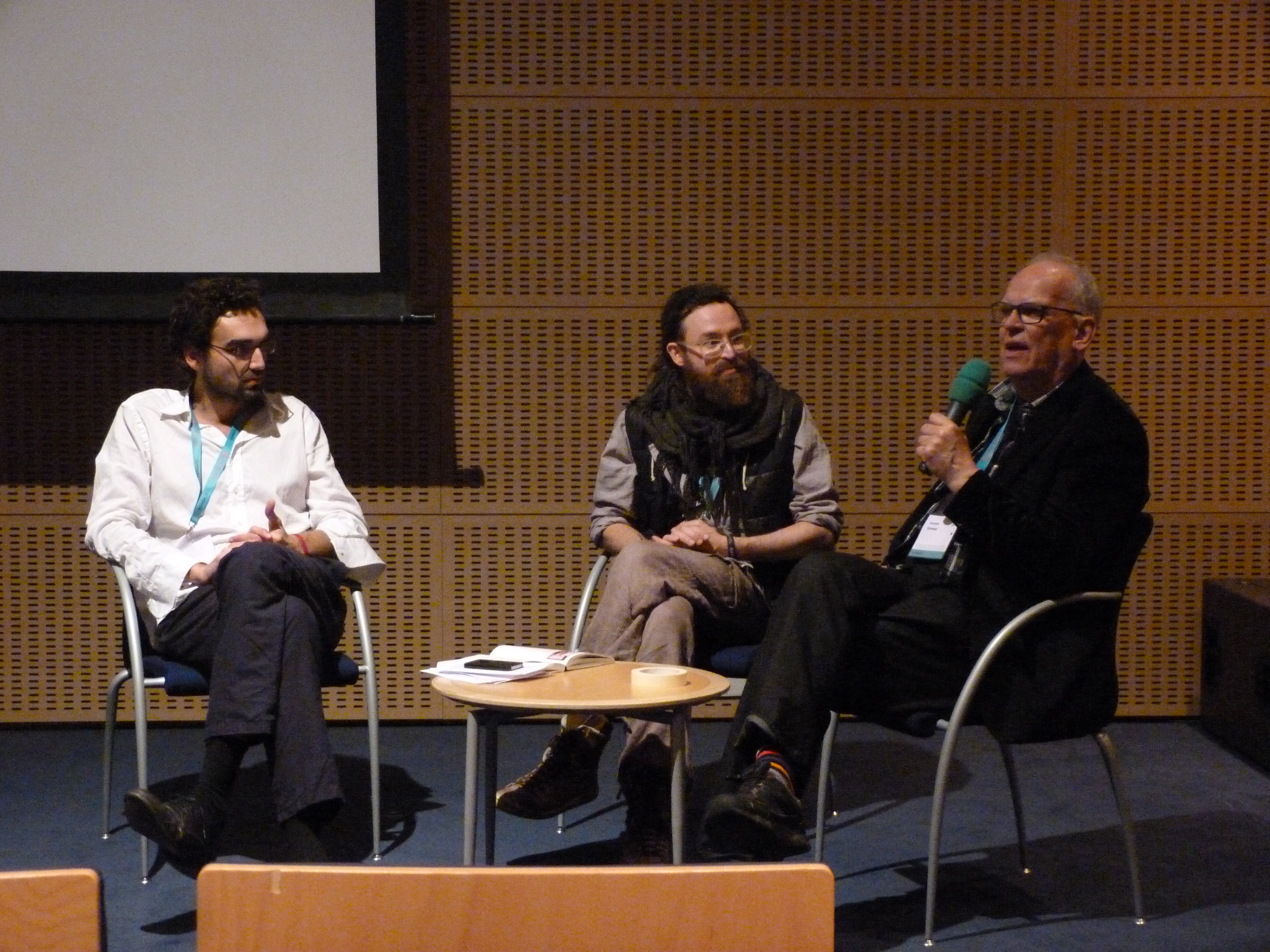
Greenlandic filmmaker Inuk Silis Høegh with members of the Greenlandic band Sumé, 2015

Greenland's musical heritage blends traditional Inuit forms with modern genres. The traditional Inuit drum dance and song, known as qilaatersorneq, is a cornerstone of Greenlandic culture. The qilaat, a frame drum made from driftwood or walrus ribs and covered with animal stomach or bladder, is played by striking the rim from underneath with a stick. These performances served various purposes, including entertainment, spiritual ceremonies, and conflict resolution through song duels, where participants would satirize each other to settle disputes. In 2021, UNESCO recognized Inuit drum dancing and singing as part of the Intangible Cultural Heritage of Humanity.

The arrival of Christian missionaries in the 18th century led to the suppression of drum dances, deemed pagan. They were replaced by polyphonic choral singing, influenced by German hymns from the Herrnhuter Brüdergemeinde. European whalers introduced instruments like the fiddle and accordion, leading to the development of kalattuut, or Greenlandic polka, characterized by fast-paced dances performed during communal gatherings.

In contemporary times, Greenland has a vibrant music scene. The band Sumé, active in the 1970s, pioneered Greenlandic rock music with politically charged lyrics advocating for cultural independence. Nanook, formed in 2008, is a pop-rock band known for singing in Greenlandic and rejecting offers to switch to English, emphasizing cultural authenticity. Other notable artists include Chilly Friday (rock), Siissisoq (rock), Nuuk Posse (hip hop), and Rasmus Lyberth (folk), who performed in the Danish national final for the 1979 Eurovision Song Contest in Greenlandic. Simon Lynge stands out as the first Greenlandic solo artist to release an album across the United Kingdom.

=== Cuisine ===
The national dish of Greenland is suaasat, a soup made from seal meat. Meat from marine mammals, game, birds, and fish have a large role in the diet. Due to the glacial landscape, most ingredients come from the ocean. Spices are seldom used besides salt and pepper. Greenlandic coffee is a "flaming" dessert coffee (set alight before serving) made with coffee, whiskey, Kahlúa, Grand Marnier, and whipped cream. It is stronger than the familiar Irish dessert coffee.

=== Sport ===
Sport is an important part of Greenlandic culture, as the population is generally quite active. Popular sports include association football, track and field, handball and skiing. Handball is often referred to as the national sport, and the men's national team was ranked among the top 20 in the world in 2001. Greenland has excellent conditions for skiing, fishing, snowboarding, ice climbing and rock climbing, although mountain climbing and hiking are preferred by the general public. Although the environment is generally ill-suited for golf, there is a golf course in Nuuk.

== See also ==
- Bibliography of Greenland
- Outline of Greenland
- Åland (Finland)
- Svalbard (Norway)
