= National anthems of Denmark =

Denmark is one of only two countries in the world—the other being New Zealand—with two official national anthems of equal status. Officially, Kong Christian stod ved højen mast is both a national and a royal anthem; it has equal status with Der er et yndigt land, which is treated as the civil national anthem. At sports events and other civil events, Der er et yndigt land is the one played.

== Der er et yndigt land ==
"Der er et yndigt land" (translated into English as "There is a lovely country") is one of the anthems of Denmark. When first published, the national anthem had 12 verses, but this was shortened to the first, third, fifth, and last verse in later editions. In common use, only the first verse (or stanza) and the last three lines of the fourth verse are sung. The first half of the last verse is rarely heard and the last line of each verse is repeated once. It is usually solely played as a national anthem for public occasions.

== Kong Christian stod ved højen mast ==
Kong Christian stod ved højen mast (Danish pronunciation: [kʰʌŋ ˈkʰʁestjæn ˈstoˀð ve̝ ˈhʌjˀn̩ mæst, - ˈkʰʁæs-]; "King Christian stood by the lofty mast"), commonly shortened to Kong Christian, is the royal anthem of the Kingdom of Denmark. It also has equal status of national anthem together with Der er et yndigt land, though it is almost exclusively used in relation to the Danish royal house and the military. On royal and military occasions, Kong Christian is usually performed alone, but there are times where the two national anthems are played together. The theme of the song is about the heroics of Danish sailors during the wars against Sweden (including the Torstenson War) in the 17th and 18th centuries.

On New Year's Eve it is tradition to sing along as the Danmarks Radio Girl's Choir sing the song on television, immediately after midnight following the other national anthem. Usually only the first verse is sung on official occasions. Adopted in 1780, it is one of the oldest national anthems in the world.

== Other parts of the Danish Realm ==
=== Faroe Islands ===
Tú alfagra land mítt (Danish: Du mit skønneste land, "Thou fairest land of mine"), officially entitled Mítt alfagra land, is the national anthem of the Faroe Islands. The anthem's lyrics, composed in 1906, are by Símun av Skarði (1872-1942) and the melody by Petur Alberg (1885-1940).

=== Greenland ===
There are also two national anthems for Danish autonomous territory Greenland, "Nunarput, utoqqarsuanngoravit" and "Nuna asiilasooq".

"Nunarput, utoqqarsuanngoravit" (Danish: Vort ældgamle land under isblinkens bavn, You Our Ancient Land) is the regional anthem of Greenland, an autonomous territory of the Kingdom of Denmark. With lyrics by Henning Jakob Henrik Lund and music composed by Jonathan Petersen, the anthem was officially adopted in 1916.

"Nuna asiilasooq" ("The Land of Great Length", Danish: Landet af Stor Længde) is a Greenlandic song used as an ethnic anthem by the self-governing Kalaallit of Greenland. It was officially recognised by the government in 1979. Both lyrics and melody were composed by Jonathan Petersen, who wrote the musical score for Greenland's 1916-adopted regional anthem, "Nunarput utoqqarsuanngoravit."

== See also ==
- Festival Overture on the Danish National Anthem – a musical piece by Tchaikovsky composed for the visit of the tsarevich to the Moscow Conservatoire accompanied by his new Danish wife. The piece is based on Kong Christian stod ved højen mast but also incorporates elements of the Russian national anthem.
