= National anthem of Denmark =

Denmark has two official national anthems with equal status:

- Der er et yndigt land, the civil national anthem
- Kong Christian stod ved højen mast, the royal national anthem
