= Nyhavn 23 =

Building in Copenhagen

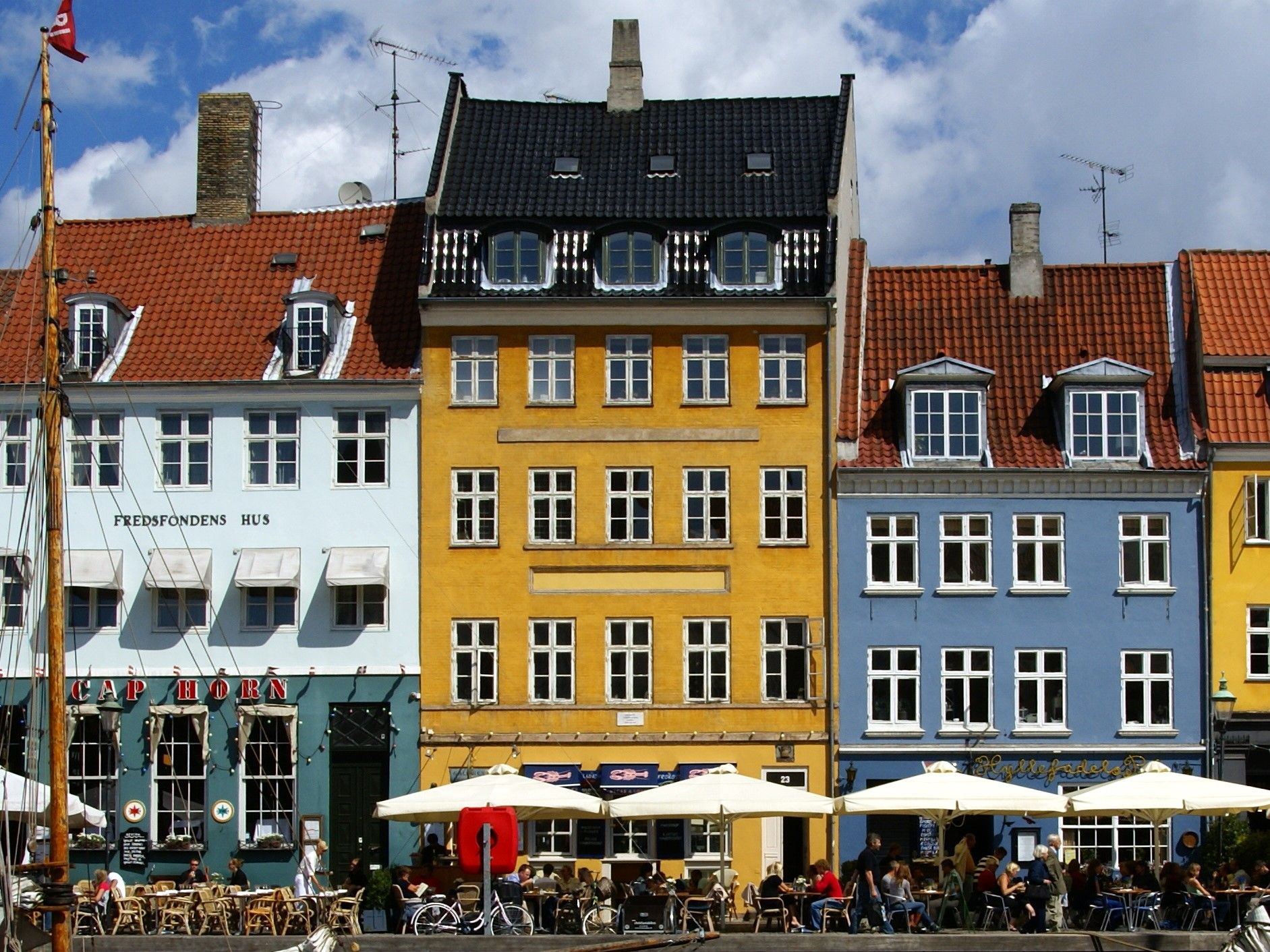
- The house seen from the other side of the canal
- Interactive map of the Nyhavn 23 area

General information
- Location: Copenhagen, Denmark
- Coordinates: 55°40′49.36″N 12°35′22.76″E
- Completed: 1803

Nyhavn 23 is a Neoclassical property overlooking the Nyhavn Canal in central Copenhagen, Denmark. It was listed in the Danish registry of protected buildings and places in 1918. A plaque on the facade commemorates the composer Friedrich Kuhlau, who resided there in 1832.

== Architecture ==
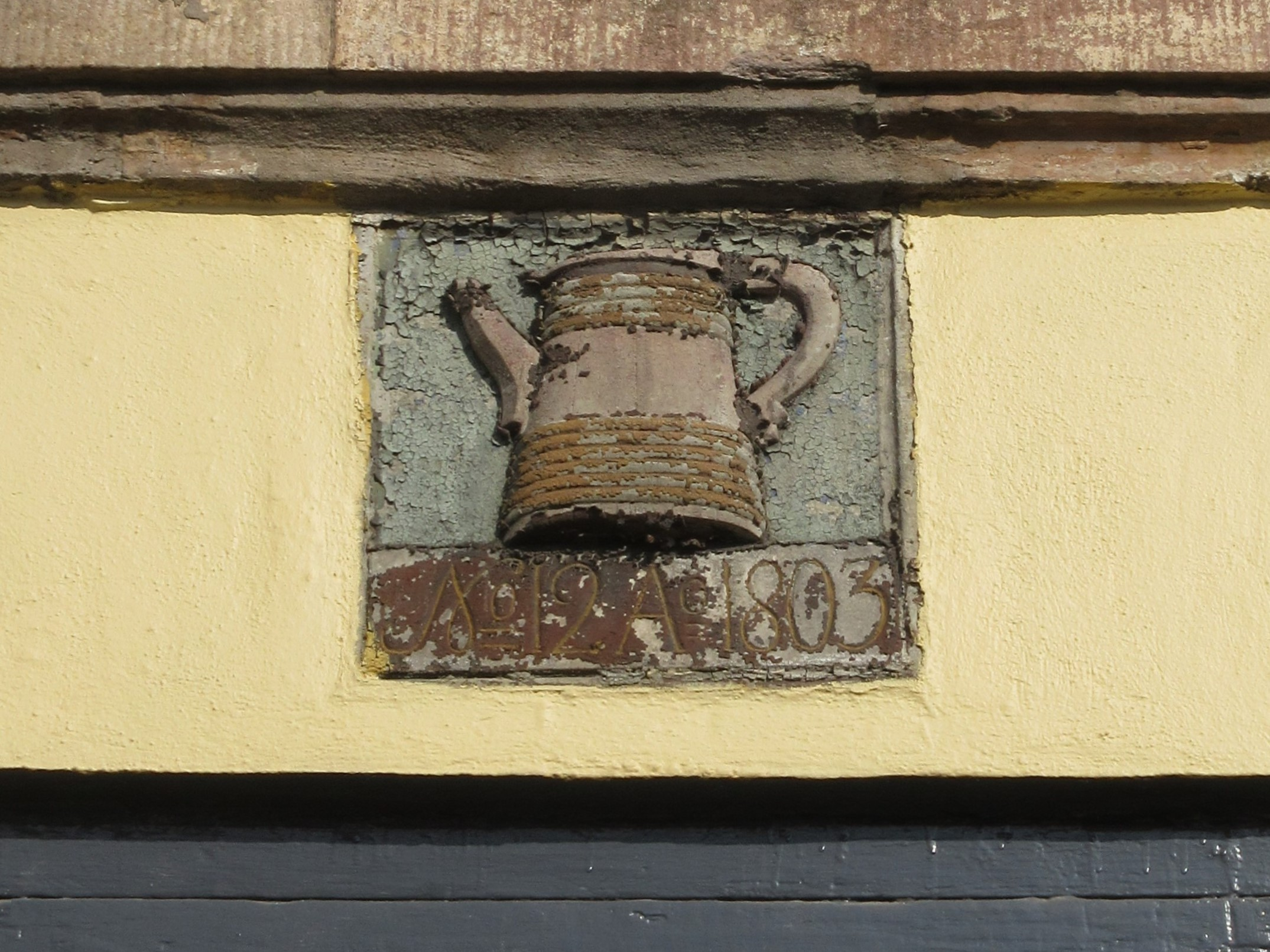
The relief above the main entrance

The building is four stories tall and four bays wide. Above the door is a stone plate from 1804 featuring a beer jug. A side wing extends from the rear side of the building.
