= National anthems of New Zealand =

External videos
- "God Save the Queen" and "God Defend New Zealand" sung together at the dedication ceremony of the New Zealand War Memorial at Hyde Park, London. 11 November 2006.

New Zealand has two official national anthems of equal status: "God Save the King" and "God Defend New Zealand". It is one of only two countries with two such anthems, the other being Denmark. The traditional anthem "God Save the King" is generally used only on royal and viceregal occasions. "God Defend New Zealand" is more commonly used on occasions when the national identity of New Zealand is the focus, such as sports events, where it is sung with English and Māori verses. On a few occasions both anthems may be used.

== God Save the King ==
"God Save the King" (alternatively "God Save the Queen" in the reign of a queen) was inherited from Britain when New Zealand was made a colony. In 1860 it was translated into Māori by Edward Marsh Williams, son of missionary Henry Williams, who had as a youth helped his father translate the Treaty of Waitangi. It remained the country's sole national anthem until 1977. There is no authorised version of the anthem as the words are a matter of tradition; only the first verse is usually sung. The words King, he, his, used at present (in the reign of Charles III), are replaced by Queen, she, her when the monarch is a woman (as in the case of the previous monarch, Elizabeth II).

As well as in Britain, the song is used in other Commonwealth realms (such as in Canada and Australia, together with "O Canada" and "Advance Australia Fair"), but does not have co-official status as a national anthem in those countries—it is regarded solely as a "royal anthem". Its use in those countries is similar in practice to that of New Zealand, where "God Save the King" is now most often played only when the monarch, another member of the monarch's family or the governor-general is present, or in other situations where a royal anthem would be used.

== God Defend New Zealand ==
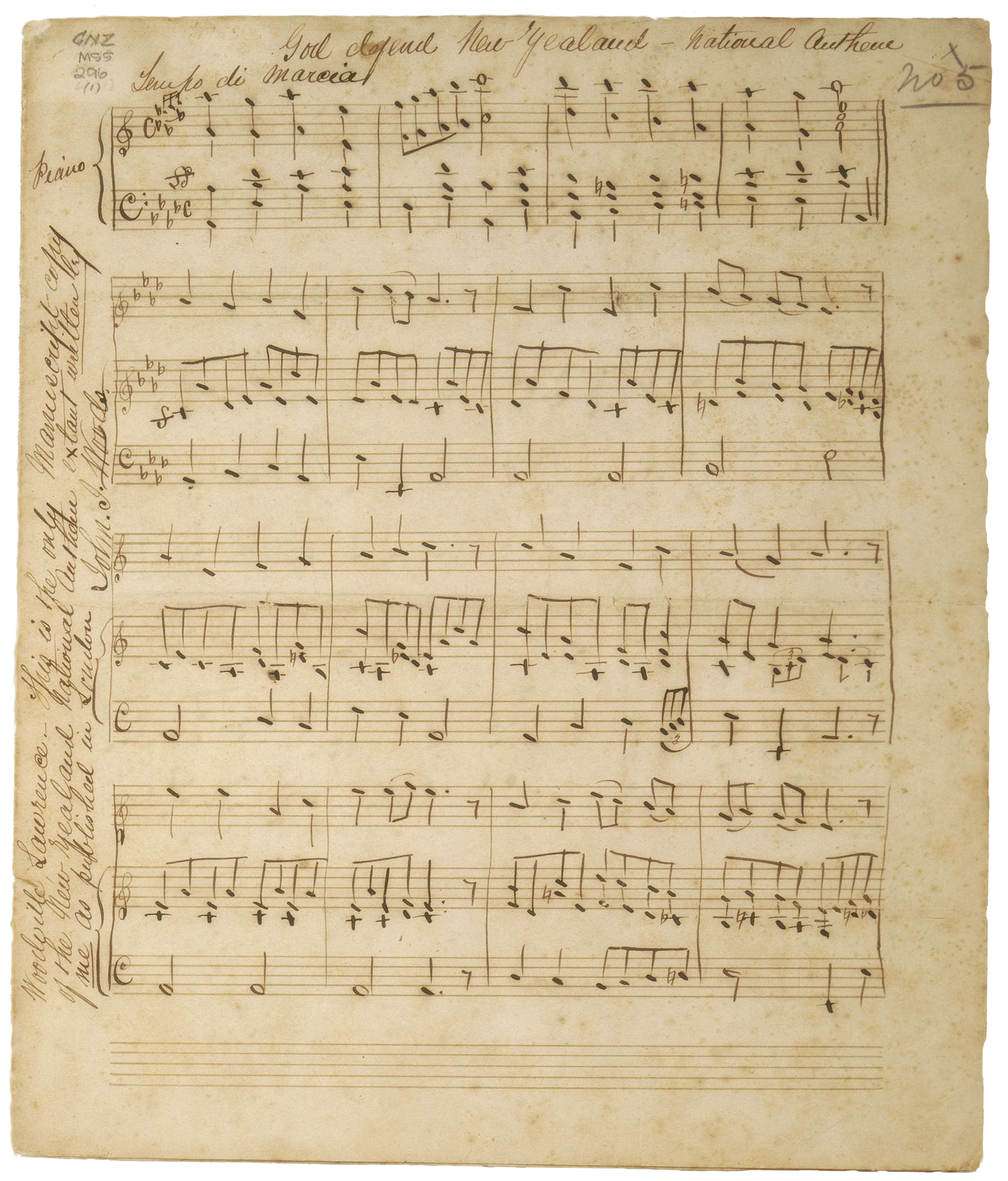
The original sheet music for "God Defend New Zealand"

"God Defend New Zealand" is a poem that was written by Thomas Bracken in the 1870s. It was set to music and first publicly performed in 1876. A Māori translation of the original English was produced in 1878 by Thomas Henry Smith. In 1940 the New Zealand Government bought the copyright and made it New Zealand's 'national hymn' in time for that year's centennial celebrations. It was used at the British Empire Games from 1950 onward, and at the Olympics from 1972. Following the performance at the Summer Olympics in Munich, a campaign began to have the hymn officially adopted as a national anthem.

In 1976 a petition was presented to Parliament asking "God Defend New Zealand" to be made the national anthem. With the consent of Queen Elizabeth II, it was gazetted as the country's second national anthem on 21 November 1977, on equal standing with "God Save the King/Queen". New Zealand was the first of the current Commonwealth realms to officially adopt a national anthem separate from "God Save the King".

Until the 1990s only the first verse of the English version was commonly sung; it has since been common to sing in both English and Māori. The first verse is sung in Māori then it is repeated in English.

== Other parts of the Realm of New Zealand ==
"Te Atua Mou E" and "Ko e Iki he Lagi" are the national anthems of the Cook Islands and Niue, respectively. In 2012, Tokelau adopted a territorial anthem, "Te Atua o Tokelau".
