= List of compositions by Friedrich Kuhlau =

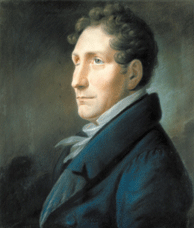
Friedrich Kuhlau, pastel by Christian Horneman from 1828

This is a list of compositions by Friedrich Kuhlau.

== With Opus Numbers ==
- Op. 1, 3 Rondos For Piano. Key: C major - Composed in about 1809 / Published in 1810
- Op. 2, 3 Rondos For Piano. Key: A major - Composed in about 1809 / Published in 1810
- Op. 3, 3 Rondos For Piano. Key: F major - Composed in about 1809 / Published in 1810
- Op. 4, Sonata For Piano. Key: E♭ major - Composed in about 1810 / Published in 1810
- Op. 5a, Sonata For Piano. Key: D minor - Composed in about 1811-2 / Published in 1812
- Op. 5b, 3 Songs With Piano. Key: ? - Composed before 1806 / Published in about 1806-7
- Op. 6a, 3 Sonatas For Piano. Key: A minor, D major, F major - Composed in about 1811 / Published in 1812
- Op. 6b, Sonatina For Piano And Optional Violin. Key: D major - Composed in 1811-2 / Published in 1812
- Op. 7, Concerto For Piano. Key: C major - Composed in 1810 / Published in 1812
- Op. 8a, Sonata For Piano. Key: A minor - Composed in about 1812 / Published in 1814
- Op. 8b, Sonata For Piano Four Hands. Key: D minor - Composed in ? / Published in ?
- Op. 9, 6 Songs With Piano. Key: ? - Composed in about 1813 / Published in 1814
- Op. 10a, 3 Duos For Two Flutes. Key: E major minor, D major, G major - Composed in ? / Published in ?
- Op. 10b, 12 Variations And Solos For Flute. Key: D major, A major, D minor, G major, G major, E minor, G major, C minor, D major, G major, D major, D minor - Composed before 1810 / Published in 1810
- Op. 11a, 10 German Songs With Piano. Key: ? - Composed in 1813 / Published in 1814
- Op. 11b, "The Oracle Bell" For Voice And Piano. Key: ? - Composed in about 1810 / Published in 1810
- Op. 12, 7 Variations For Piano. Key: ? - Composed in about 1814 / Published in 1815
- Op. 13, 3 Trios For Three Flutes. Key: D major, G minor, F major - Composed in about 1814 / Published in 1815
- Op. 14, 5 Variations For Piano. Key: ? - Composed in about 1813 / Published in 1813
- Op. 15, 8 Variations For Piano. Key: ? - Composed in about 1815 / Published in 1816
- Op. 16, 8 Variations For Piano. Key: ? - Composed in about 1818 / Published in 1819
- Op. 17, Sonatina For Piano Four Hands. Key: F major - Composed in ? / Published in 1818
- Op. 18, 9 Variations For Piano. Key: ? - Composed in ? / Published in 1819
- Op. 19, 10 German Songs With Piano. Key: ? - Composed in about 1818 / Published in 1819
- Op. 20, 3 Sonatinas For Piano. Key: C major, G major, F major - Composed in about 1819 / Published in 1820
- Op. 21, 3 Poems By Heinrich Wilhelm von Gerstenberg With Piano. Key: ? - Composed in about 1820 / Published in 1820
- Op. 22, Variations For Piano. Key: ? - Composed in about 1820 / Published in 1820
- Op. 23, 12 German Songs With Piano. Key: ? - Composed in 1819 / Published in 1820
- Op. 24, 8 Waltzes For Piano Four Hands. Key: ? - Composed in about 1820 / Published in 1821
- Op. 25, Fantasy And Variations For Piano. Key: ? - Composed in about 1815 / Published in 1821
- Op. 26, 3 Sonatas For Piano. Key: G major, C major, E♭ major - Composed in ? / Published in 1821
- Op. 27, "The Magic Harp"; music for drama. Key: ? - Composed in 1816 / Published in 1820
- Op. 28, 6 Waltzes For Piano Four Hands. Key: ? - Composed in ? / Published in 1821/2
- Op. 29, "Elisa"; music for drama. Key: ? - Composed in 1819-20 / Published in 1820
- Op. 30, Sonata For Piano. Key: B major - Composed in ? / Published in 1821
- Op. 31, 3 Easy Rondos For Piano. Key: ? - Composed in 1820 / Published in 1821
- Op. 32, Quartet For Piano, Violin, Viola, And Violoncello. Key: C minor - Composed in 1820-1 / Published in 1821
- Op. 33, Sonata For Piano And Violin. Key: F minor - Composed in about 1821 / Published in 1822
- Op. 34, Sonata For Piano. Key: G major - Composed in 1821 / Published in 1822
- Op. 35, 9 Variations For Piano. Key: ? - Composed in 1821 / Published in 1821
- Op. 36, "The Celebration Of Goodwill" For Voices And Accompaniment. Key: ? - Composed in ? / Published in 1822
- Op. 37, Divertimento For Piano. Key: E♭ major - Composed in 1821 / Published in 1822
- Op. 38, 3 Fantasies For Flute. Key: D major, G major, C major - Composed in 1821 / Published in 1822
- Op. 39, 3 Duos For Two Flutes. Key: E major minor, B major, D major - Composed in ? / Published in 1821/2
- Op. 40, 6 Easy Rondos For Piano. Key: ? - Composed in about 1821 / Published in 1822
- Op. 41, 8 Easy Rondos For Piano. Key: ? - Composed in about 1821 / Published in 1822
- Op. 42, 6 Variations For Piano On Austrian Folk Songs. Key: ? - Composed in about 1821 / Published in 1822
- Op. 43, Does not seem to have been used.
- Op. 44, 3 Sonatinas For Piano Four Hands. Key: G major, C major, F major - Composed in about 1822 / Published in 1822
- Op. 45, Concertino For Two Horns. Key: F minor - Composed in about 1822 / Published in 1830
- Op. 46, 3 Sonatas For Piano. Key: G major, D minor, C major - Composed in about 1822 / Published in 1823
- Op. 47, "Eurydice In Tartarus"; music for drama (By Jens Immanuel Baggesen). Key: ? - Composed in 1816 / Overture published in 1823
- Op. 48, 10 Variations For Piano On A Folk Song From Carl Maria von Weber's "The Freeshooter". Key: ? - Composed in about 1822 / Published in 1822
- Op. 49, Variations For Piano On Six Themes From Carl Maria von Weber's "The Freeshooter". Key: ? - Composed in 1822 / Published in 1822
- Op. 50, Quartet For Piano, Violin, Viola, And Violoncello. Key: A major - Composed in about 1821 / Published in 1822
- Op. 51, Quintet For Flute, Violin, Two Violas, And Violoncello. Key: D major, E major, A major - Composed in about 1822 / Published in 1823
- Op. 52, 3 Sonatas For Piano. Key: F major, B major, A major - Composed in about 1822 / Published in 1823
- Op. 53, Variations For Piano. Key: ? - Composed in 1822/3 / Published in 1823
- Op. 54, 10 Variations For Piano On Giuseppe Francesco Bianchi. Key: ? - Composed in about 1823 / Published in 1823
- Op. 55, 6 Sonatinas For Piano. Key: C major, G major, C major, F major, D major, C major - Composed in 1823 / Published in 1823
- Op. 56, 3 Easy Rondos For Piano On Wolfgang Amadeus Mozart's "The Marriage Of Figaro, Or The Day Of Madness". Key: F major, C major, G major - Composed in 1823 / Published in 1823
- Op. 57, 3 Solos For Flute And Optional Piano. Key: F major, A minor, G major - Composed in ? / Published in 1824
- Op. 58, 4 Variations For Piano Four Hands On "Give Calm, O Heaven" From Gioachino Rossini's "Otello". Key: ? - Composed in about 1823 / Published in 1824
- Op. 59, 3 Sonatinas For Piano. Key: A major, F major, C major - Composed in about 1824 / Published in 1824
- Op. 60, 3 Sonatinas With Variations For Piano. Key: F major, A major, C major - Composed in about 1825 / Published in 1825
- Op. 61, 6 Divertimentos In The Form Of A Waltz For Piano. Key: ? - Composed in about 1824 / Published in 1825
- Op. 62, Variations For Piano On Three Themes From Carl Maria von Weber's "Euryanthe". Key: ? - Composed in about 1824 / Published in 1824
- Op. 63, 6 Variations For Flute And Piano On Carl Maria von Weber's "Euryanthe". Key: ? - Composed in about 1824 / Published in 1825
- Op. 64, Sonata For Flute And Piano. Key: E♭ major - Composed in ? / Published in 1825
- Op. 65, "Lulu"; opera in three acts (By Carl Frederik Güntelberg). Key: ? - Composed in 1823-4 / Published in 1825
- Op. 66, 3 Sonatinas For Piano Four Hands. Key: F major, C major, G major - Composed in about 1824 / Published in 1825
- Op. 67, 6 Four-Voice Songs For Male Voices. Key: ? - Composed in ? / Published in about 1825
- Op. 68, 6 Divertimentos For Flute And Optional Piano. Key: ? - Composed in about 1825 / Published in 1825
- Op. 69, Sonata For Flute And Piano. Key: G major - Composed in about 1825 / Published in about 1826
- Op. 70, 3 Rondos For Piano Four Hands. Key: ? - Composed in about 1826 / Published in 1826
- Op. 71, Sonata For Flute And Piano. Key: E minor - Composed in ? / Published in 1826
- Op. 72a, 9 Variations For Piano Four Hands On Ludwig van Beethoven's "Heart, My Heart, What Is Giving?", Op. 75, Nr. 2. Key: ? - Composed in about 1826 / Published in 1826
- Op. 72b, 3 Songs With Piano. Key: ? - Composed in 1821-3 / Published in 1823
- Op. 73, 3 Rondos For Piano On Opera Melodies. Key: ? - Composed in about 1826 / Published in 1826
- Op. 74a, "William Shakespeare"; music for drama (By Casper Johannes Boye). Key: ? - Composed in 1825-6 / Overture published in 1826
- Op. 74b, Adaptation For Piano Of Op. 74a. Key: ? - Composed in 1825-6 / Published in 1873
- Op. 75, Variations For Piano Four Hands On Ludwig van Beethoven's "The Quail's Beating", WoO 129. Key: ? - Composed in about 1826 / Published in 1826/7
- Op. 76, 8 Variations For Piano Four Hands On Ludwig van Beethoven's "The Luck Of Life", Op. 88. Key: ? - Composed in about 1826 / Published in 1827
- Op. 77, 8 Variations For Piano Four Hands On Ludwig van Beethoven's "Longing", Op. 83, Nr. 2. Key: ? - Composed in about 1826 / Published in 1827
- Op. 78, 2 Poems By Ignaz Franz Castelli For Voice And Piano. Key: ? - Composed in ? / Published in about 1827
- Op. 79, 3 Sonatas For Violin And Piano. Key: F major, A minor, C major - Composed in about 1827 / Published in 1827
- Op. 80, 3 Duos For Two Flutes. Key: G major, C major, E minor - Composed in about 1826 / Published in 1827/8
- Op. 81, 3 Duos For Two Flutes. Key: D major, F major, G minor - Composed in about 1826 / Published in 1827/82
- Op. 82, 9 Four-Voice Songs For Unaccompanied Male Voices. Key: ? - Composed in 1826 / Published in 1828
- Op. 83, 3 Sonatas For Flute And Piano. Key: G major, C major, G minor - Composed in about 1826 / Published in 1827/8
- Op. 84, 3 Rondos For Piano On Opera Melodies. Key: ? - Composed in 1827 / Published in 1827
- Op. 85, Sonata For Flute And Piano. Key: A major - Composed in ? / Published in 1827
- Op. 86, 3 Trios For 3 Flutes. Key: E major minor, D major, E♭ major - Composed in about 1826-7 / Published in 1827
- Op. 87, 3 Duos For 2 Flutes. Key: A major, G minor, D major - Composed in about 1827 / Published in 1827
- Op. 88, 4 Sonatinas For Piano. Key: C major, G major, A minor, F major - Composed in 1827 / Published in 1827
- Op. 89, 8 Four-Voice Songs For Unaccompanied Male Voices. Key: ? - Composed in about 1826 / Published in 1828/9
- Op. 90, Trio For 3 Flutes. Key: B major - Composed in about 1826 / Published in 1828
- Op. 91, 11 Variations For Piano On "And Small Karin Won". Key: ? - Composed in about 1826 / Published in 1828
- Op. 92, "The Charms Of Copenhagen"; rondo for piano. Key: ? - Composed in about 1826 / Published in 1828
- Op. 93, Fantasy For Piano On Swedish Songs. Key: ? - Composed in ? / Published in 1828
- Op. 94, 8 Variations For Flute And Piano On George Louis Onslow's "For The Girls". Key: ? - Composed in 1829 / Published in 1829
- Op. 95, 3 Fantasies For Flute And Optional Piano. Key: ? - Composed in about 1828 / Published in 1829
- Op. 96, Rondo For Piano On George Louis Onslow's Opera "The Book Peddler, Or The Lumberjack's Son". Key: ? - Composed in about 1828 / Published in 1828
- Op. 97, 2 Rondos For Piano On Joseph Ferdinand Hérold's Opera "Marie". Key: ? - Composed in 1829 / Published in 1829
- Op. 98a, Rondo For Flute And Piano On George Louis Onslow's "The Book Peddler, Or The Lumberjack's Son". Key: E major - Composed in about 1828 / Published in 1829
- Op. 98b, Rondo For Piano Adapted From Op. 98a. Key: E major - Composed in 1834 / Published in ?
- Op. 99, 8 Variations For Flute And Piano On George Louis Onslow's "The Book Peddler, Or The Lumberjack's Son". Key: ? - Composed in 1829 / Published in 1830
- Op. 100, "Elves' Hill"; music for drama in five acts (By Johan Ludvig Heiberg). Key: ? - Composed in 1828 / Published in 1828
- Op. 101, 8 Variations For Flute And Piano On Ludwig Spohr's Opera "Jessonda". Key: ? - Composed in about 1829 / Published in 1830
- Op. 102, 3 Duos For Two Flutes. Key: D major, E major, A major - Composed in about 1829 / Published in 1830
- Op. 103, Quartet For Four Flutes. Key: E minor - Composed in 1829 / Published in 1830
- Op. 104, 5 Variations For Flute And Piano On A Scottish Folk Song. Key: ? - Composed in 1829 / Published in 1830
- Op. 105, 7 Variations for Flute And Piano on the Irish Folk Song "The Last Rose of Summer". Key: ? - Composed in 1829 / Published in 1830
- Op. 106, 6 Romances And Songs By Friedrich de la Motte Fouqué With Piano. Key: ? - Composed in 1829 / Published in 1830
- Op. 107, "Hugh And Adelaide"; opera in three acts (By Casper Johannes Boye). Key: ? - Composed in 1827 / Published in 1827/38
- Op. 108, Quartet For Piano, Violin, Viola, And Violoncello. Key: G minor - Composed in 1829 / Published in 1833
- Op. 109, 3 Rondos For Piano On Beloved Melodies. Key: ? - Composed in 1829/30 / Published in 1830
- Op. 110, 3 Brilliant Duos For Flute Or Violin And Piano. Key: B major, E minor, D major - Composed in ? / Published in 1830
- Op. 111, 3 Rondos For Piano Four Hands. Key: C major, D major, D major - Composed in about 1831 / Published in 1831
- Op. 112, 3 Varied Airs For Piano. Key: C major, G major, F major - Composed in about 1831 / Published in 1831
- Op. 113, 3 Rondos For Piano On Opera Melodies. Key: ? - Composed in about 1831 / Published in 1832
- Op. 114, 3 Varied Airs For Piano Four Hands. Key: G major, C major, F major - Composed in ? / Published in 1832
- Op. 115, "The Three Brothers From Damascus"; comedy in three acts (By Adam Gottlob Oehlenschläger). Key: ? - Composed in 1830 / Published in 1830
- Op. 116, Variations For Piano On Gioachino Antonio Rossini's "William Tell". Key: ? - Composed in about 1831 / Published in 1831
- Op. 117, 3 Rondolettos For Piano On Songs By Ludwig van Beethoven. Key: ? - Composed in about 1831 / Published in 1831
- Op. 118, 3 Rondos For Piano On Opera Melodies By Daniel François Auber. Key: ? - Composed in about 1830-1 / Published in 1831
- Op. 119, Trio For Two Flutes And Piano. Key: G major - Composed in ? / Published in 1832
- Op. 120, "The Lightness"; rondo for piano over Niccolò Paganini. Key: F major - Composed in ? / Published in 1832
- Op. 121, "The Little Bell"; rondo for piano over Niccolò Paganini. Key: A minor - Composed in ? / Published in 1832
- Op. 122, Quartet For Two Violins, Viola, And Violoncello. Key: A minor - Composed in 1831 / Published in 1841
- Op. 123, Allegro Patetico For Piano Four Hands. Key: ? - Composed in ? / Published in 1832
- Op. 124, Rondo Adagio For Piano Four Hands. Key: D major - Composed in ? / Published in 1832
- Op. 125, Pastoral Rondo For Piano. Key: C major - Composed in ? / Published in 1832
- Op. 126, Divertimento For Piano On Themes By Wolfgang Amadeus Mozart. Key: ? - Composed in ? / Published in 1833
- Op. 127, Sonata For Piano. Key: E♭ major - Composed before 1820 / Published in 1833

== Without Opus Numbers ==
- WoO 128, 2 Romances From "Hugh From Reinberg"; tragedy in five acts (By Adam Gottlob Oehlenschläger). Key: ? - Composed in 1814 / Published in 1814
- WoO 129, "The Castle Robber"; opera in three acts (By Adam Gottlob Oehlenschläger). Key: ? - Composed in 1813 / Published in 1815
- WoO 130, "The Happy Hero"; lyric scene (By Christian Levin Sander). Key: ? - Composed in about 1819 / Published in ?
- WoO 131, 2 Songs From "Aladdin"; music for drama (By Adam Gottlob Oehlenschläger). Key: ? - Composed in 1816-30 / Published in 1839
- WoO 132, "On The Joy" For Solos, Chorus, And Orchestra. Key: ? - Composed in 1813 / Published in ?
- WoO 133, Cantatina For Two Sopranos And Mixed Chorus With Flute And String Orchestra. Key: ? - Composed in about 1814 / Published in ?
- WoO 134, "Reformation Cantata". Key: ? - Composed in 1817 / Published in ?
- WoO 135, "Sorrow Cantata". Key: ? - Composed in 1818 / Published in ?
- WoO 136, "Wedding Cantata". Key: ? - Composed in 1828 / Published in ?
- WoO 137a, Two Folk Songs For Voice And Piano. Key: ? - Composed in about 1819 / Published in 1819
- WoO 137b, Adaptation For Orchestra Of Op. 137a, Nr. 2. Key: ? - Composed in about 1819 / Published in 1819
- WoO 138, March For Piano With Optional Chorus. Key: ? - Composed in about 1820 / Published in 1821
- WoO 139, The Norwegian Crown National Song. Key: ? - Composed in 1821 / Published in 1822
- WoO 140, Song For The Ground Cadets. Key: ? - Composed in 1828 / Published in 1828
- WoO 141, "Voice In The Darkness" For Male Choir With Guitar. Key: ? - Composed in ? / Published in ?
- WoO 142, "Joy"; song for two sopranos, tenor, and bass with piano. Key: ? - Composed in ? / Published in 1824
- WoO 143, 2 Mosaic Chorales. Key: ? - Composed in 1817 / Published in 1826
- WoO 144, "Nice Is No More, My Friend"; duettino with piano. Key: ? - Composed in ? / Published before 1808
- WoO 145, "The Abbess And The Nun"; antiphony for two voices with piano. Key: ? - Composed in ? / Published in about 1810
- WoO 146, "The Flowers" For Voice And Piano. Key: ? - Composed before 1808 / Published before 1808
- WoO 147, "The Violets" For Voice And Piano. Key: ? - Composed before 1808 / Published in 1808
- WoO 148, Air From "One From Three" For Voice And Piano. Key: ? - Composed in ? / Published in ?
- WoO 149, Easy Pieces For Piano And Voice. Key: ? - Composed before 1810 / Published before 1810
- WoO 150, "Resignation" For Voice And Piano. Key: ? - Composed before 1810 / Published in about 1810
- WoO 151, "Do You Know The Land?" For Voice And Piano. Key: ? - Composed before 1810 / Published in about 1810
- WoO 152, "The Bathing Maiden" For Voice And Piano. Key: ? - Composed before 1811 / Published in about 1810
- WoO 153, 3 Canzonettas For Voice And Piano. Key: ? - Composed in 1813 / Published in 1818/9
- WoO 154, "Romance On The First Of January" For Voice And Piano. Key: ? - Composed in 1813 / Published in 1813
- WoO 155, "Fresh From The Joy" For Voice And Piano. Key: ? - Composed in 1814 / Published in 1842
- WoO 156, "Restless Love" For Voice And Piano. Key: ? - Composed in ? / Published in about 1815
- WoO 157, "The Flower Of Eternity" For Voice And Piano. Key: ? - Composed in about 1818 / Published in 1818
- WoO 158, "Roses For Every Month" For Four Voices With Piano. Key: ? - Composed in 1818 / Published in 1818
- WoO 159, "Urania" For Voice And Piano. Key: ? - Composed in ? / Published in about 1820
- WoO 160, "The Border At Hjelmen" For Voice And Piano. Key: ? - Composed in 1822 / Published in 1822
- WoO 161, "The Trip To The Moon" For Voice And Piano. Key: ? - Composed in about 1822 / Published in 1822
- WoO 162, "In The Spring" For Voice And Piano. Key: ? - Composed in about 1823 / Published in 1823
- WoO 163, "Song To Freedom" For Voice And Piano. Key: ? - Composed in about 1824 / Published in 1824
- WoO 164, 2 Songs From "A Mountain Fairy Tale" For Voice And Piano. Key: ? - Composed in 1824/5 / Published in 1825
- WoO 165, "Memory" For Voice And Piano. Key: ? - Composed in about 1827 / Published in 1827
- WoO 166, 3 Posthumous Songs For Voice And Piano. Key: ? - Composed in ? / Published in 1875
- WoO 167, 3 Songs From Vang For Voice And Piano. Key: ? - Composed in ? / Published in ?
- WoO 168, "Eleonore's Rapture" For Voice With Flute And Piano. Key: ? - Composed in about 1829 / Published in ?
- WoO 169, Two-Voice Puzzle Canon. Key: ? - Composed before 1809 / Published in 1808/9
- WoO 170, 5 Puzzle Canons. Key: ? - Composed in ? / Published in 1811
- WoO 171, "Alleluia"; three-voice canon. Key: ? - Composed in ? / Published in 1811
- WoO 172, Canon For The Piano. Key: ? - Composed in ? / Published in 1811
- WoO 173, "Ave Maria"; seven-voice canon. Key: ? - Composed in ? / Published in 1812
- WoO 174, Two-Voice Canon. Key: A minor - Composed in ? / Published in ?
- WoO 175, Twelve-Voice Crab Canon. Key: ? - Composed in ? / Published in ?
- WoO 176, Musical Anagram On B, A, C, H. Key: ? - Composed in ? / Published in ?
- WoO 177, "Kaael, Not Tepid"; Canon By Ludwig van Beethoven. Key: ? - Composed in ? / Published in ?
- WoO 178, Two-Voice Canon. Key: B major - Composed in ? / Published in 1820
- WoO 179, Four-Voice Canon. Key: A minor - Composed in ? / Published in 1821
- WoO 180, "Plead, Weep"; four-voice canon. Key: ? - Composed in ? / Published in 1821
- WoO 181, "Good Wine"; six-voice canon. Key: ? - Composed in ? / Published in 1821
- WoO 182, Canon For Twenty-Eight Voices. Key: ? - Composed in ? / Published in 1821
- WoO 183, Comic Canons. Key: ? - Composed in ? / Published in 1817
- WoO 184, Four-Voice Puzzle Canon. Key: ? - Composed in ? / Published in ?
- WoO 185, Symphony. Key: ? - Composed before 1805 / Published in ?
- WoO 186, 12 Dances For Two Violins And Contrabass. Key: ? - Composed before 1808 / Published in ?
- WoO 187, Concerto For Piano. Key: F minor - Composed in 1811 / Published in ?
- WoO 188, 3 Cantabile Movements For Flute. Key: ? - Composed in ? / Published in 1834
- WoO 189, Andante And Polacca For Horn And Piano. Key: - ? Composed in ? / Published in ?
- WoO 190, English Dance For Four Instruments. Key: ? - Composed in ? / Published in ?
- WoO 191, Sonatina For Piano Four Hands. Key: C major - Composed in ? / Published in about 1835
- WoO 192, Divertimento For Piano Four Hands. Key: B♭ major - Composed in ? / Published in 1838
- WoO 193, Waltzes From Dobberan For Piano Four hands. Key: ? - Composed in ? / Published before 1824
- WoO 194, Adagio And Allegro Con Brio For Piano. Key: ? - Composed in / Published before 1820 ?
- WoO 195, Grave And Allegro Non Tanto For Piano. Key: ? - Composed in about 1820 / Published in ?
- WoO 196, Variations For Piano On An Air By Henri Montan Berton. Key: ? - Composed before 1808 / Published in 1807
- WoO 197, "For The Well-Being Of Hamburg"; variations for piano. Key: ? - Composed before 1810 / Published in ?
- WoO 198, 67 Variations For Piano. Key: ? - Composed before 1816 / Published before 1816
- WoO 199, "During A Dark Trip" For Piano. Key: ? - Composed before 1816 / Published before 1816
- WoO 200, Andantino With Variations For Piano. Key: ? - Composed in ? / Published in 1822
- WoO 201, Lento Al Rovescio For Piano. Key: ? - Composed before 1818 / Published in ?
- WoO 202, Rondo For Piano. Key: A major - Composed in 1815 / Published in ?
- WoO 203, Rondo For Piano On A Theme By Jacques Pierre Rode. Key: A minor - Composed in ? / Published in 1814
- WoO 204, "Thunderstorm At The Sea"; tone painting for piano. Key: ? - Composed in about 1810 / Published in ?
- WoO 205, Funeral March For Piano. Key: ? - Composed in 1814 / Published in 1814
- WoO 206, 2 Lamentation Marches For Piano. Key: ? - Composed in 1815 / Published in 1815
- WoO 207, "The Meeting Of The Bodyguards"; march for piano. Key: ? - Composed in about 1815 / Published in 1815
- WoO 208, 2 Weapon-Dances For Piano. Key: ? - Composed in ? / Published in 1816
- WoO 209, Review March For The Guards For Piano. Key: ? - Composed in ? / Published in 1818
- WoO 210, 6 Waltzes For Piano. Key: ? - Composed before 1808 / Published before 1808
- WoO 211, 10 Waltzes For Piano. Key: ? - Composed in ? / Published in 1812/3
- WoO 212, 12 Waltzes For Piano. Key: ? - Composed in ? / Published in 1817
- WoO 213, Favorite Waltzes For Piano. Key: A major - Composed in ? / Published in 1817
- WoO 214, Waltzes For Piano. Key: F major - Composed in about 1818 / Published in ?
- WoO 215, "Kaleidacousticon" For Piano. Key: ? - Composed in about 1817 / Published in about 1817
- WoO 216, Great Heroic Waltz For Piano. Key: ? - Composed in ? / Published in 1822
- WoO 217, 12 Scottish Dances For Piano. Key: ? - Composed in ? / Published in about 1810
- WoO 218, 6 Scottish Dances For Piano. Key: ? - Composed in ? / Published in 1812
- WoO 219, "Old And New Times"; minuet for piano. Key: ? - Composed in ? / Published in about 1812
- WoO 220, Scottish For Piano. Key: E♭ major - Composed in ? / Published in ?
- WoO 221, Polacca For Piano. Key: B major - Composed in ? / Published in about 1834
- WoO 222, Figured Bass School. Key: ? - Composed in ? / Published in ?
- WoO 223, Overture On "The Triumph Of Love". Key: ? - Composed in ? / Published in ?
- WoO 224, Scene From Ossian's "Comala". Key: ? - Composed in ? / Published in ?
- WoO 225, "Moses"; music for drama (By Ernst August Klingemann). Key: ? - Composed in ? / Published in ?
- WoO 226, "Alfred"; opera (By August Friedrich von Kotzebue). Key: ? - Composed in ? / Published in ?
- WoO 227, 3 Progressive Sonatas For Flute Or Violin And Piano. Key: ? - Composed in ? / Published in ?
- WoO 228, 6 Waltzes For Piano Four Hands. Key: ? - Composed in ? / Published in ?
- WoO 229, 5 Waltzes For Piano. Key: ? - Composed in ? / Published in ?
- WoO 230, 6 Little Waltzes For Piano. Key: ? - Composed in ? / Published in ?
- WoO 231, 12 Poems By Frederik Høegh-Guldberg. Key: ? - Composed in ? / Published in ?
- WoO 232, Romances And Songs In Two Volumes For Voice And Piano. Key: ? - Composed in ? / Published in ?
