= Henrik Nikolai Krøyer =

Danish zoologist (1799-1870)

Henrik Krøyer
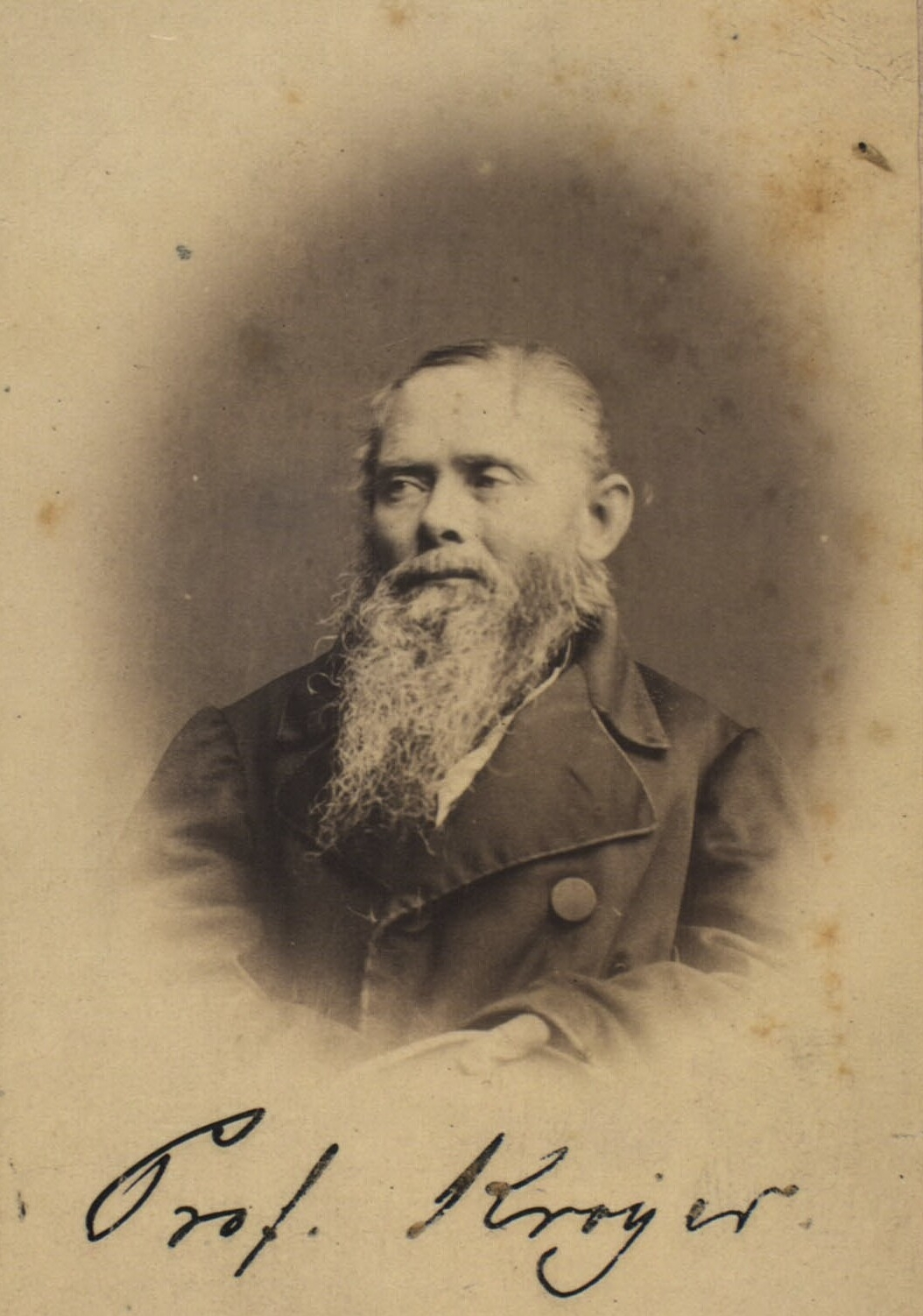
- Born: Henrik Nikolai Krøyer; 22 March 1799; Copenhagen
- Died: 14 November 1870 (aged 71); Copenhagen
- Resting place: Assistens Cemetery
- Education: Heidelberg University; University of Copenhagen
- Occupation: Zoologist
- Children: Peder Severin Krøyer (adopted)
- Relatives: Hans Ernst Krøyer (brother)

Henrik Nikolai Krøyer (22 March 1799 – 14 November 1870) was a Danish zoologist. He was a specialist on the endo- and ecto-parasites of fishes. He described the salmon louse Lepeophtheirus salmonis.

== Life and work ==
Born in Copenhagen, he was a brother of the composer Hans Ernst Krøyer. He went to the Civic School under Nielsen who influenced an interest in languages and culture. His mother died when he was 14 and father moved to work in the West Indies and he was taken care by the physician Frederik Ludvig Bang. He started studying medicine at the University of Copenhagen in 1817, which he later changed to history and philology and never completed. While a student, he was a supporter of the Philhellenic movement, and he participated as a volunteer in the Greek War of Independence along with several fellow students. He then went across Europe on travel. Upon his return to Denmark, he managed to earn a living by mentoring a cousin. He also resumed his philological studies Krøyer also gained an interest in zoology. In 1827, he took the position as assistant teacher at Stavanger Latin School. He suffered from a severe fever and was taken care of by Bertha Cecilie Gjesdal, who he married in 1833. Bertha's sister, Ellen Cecilie Gjesdal, was deemed mentally unfit to bring up her child, so Henrik and Bertha adopted the boy, who took on the name Peder Severin Krøyer, and later became a well-known painter. Even at the age of ten, the boy was able to produce technical illustrations for the work of his father.

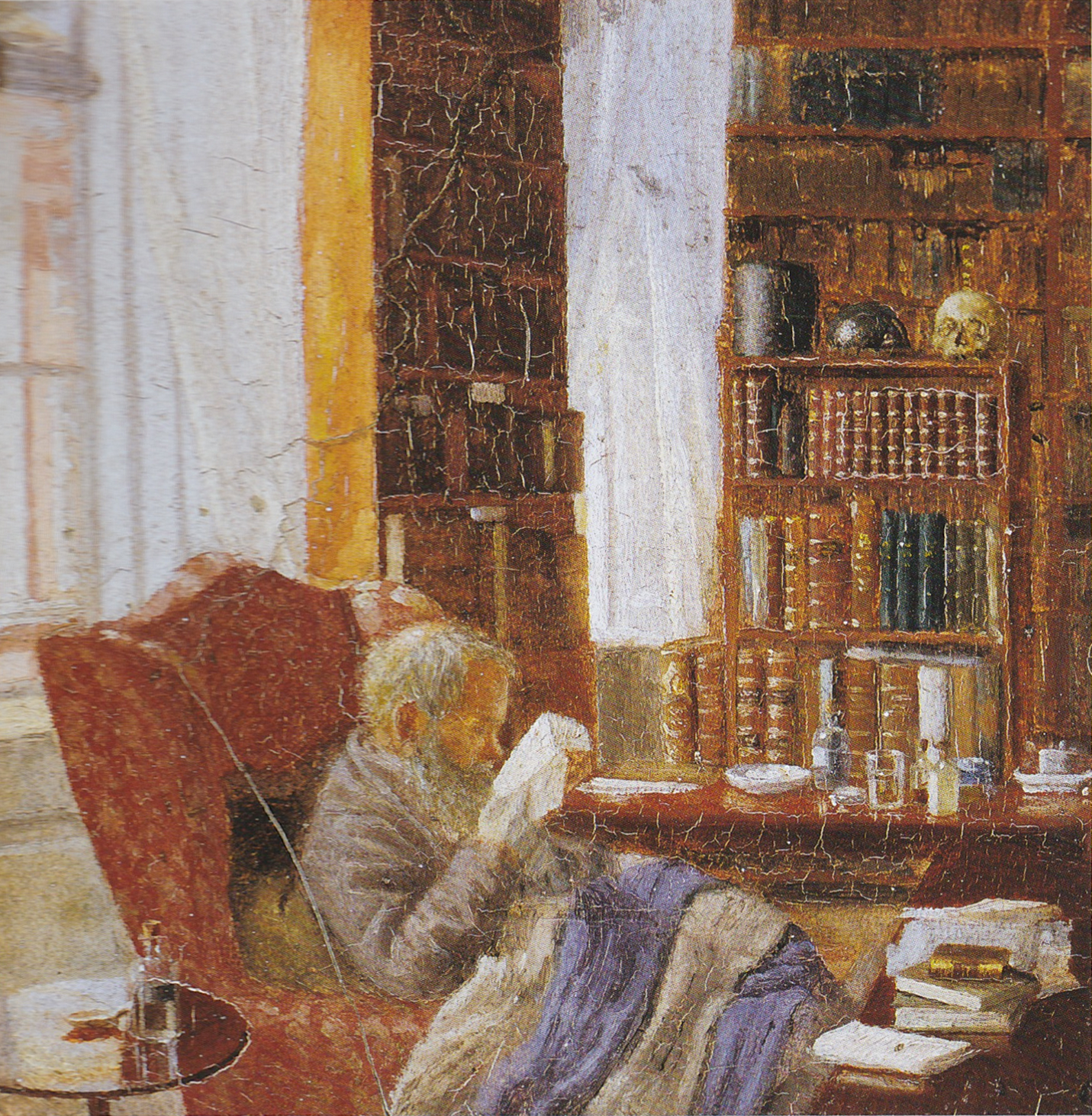
Portrait of his foster father in 1866 by Peder Krøyer

Krøyer returned to Copenhagen in 1830 where he was employed as a teacher in natural history at the Military Academy. As the course lacked a textbook, Krøyer wrote and published Grundtræk til Vejledning ved naturhistorisk Undervisning (1833), which went through eight editions. In 1833 he was active in the newly founded organization Naturhistorisk Forening begun by Daniel Frederik Eschricht (1798-1863) and Joakim Frederik Schouw (1789-1852). In 1834 he studied the fish of the Danish waters, on the request of the Chamber of Demesne, and went to Spitzbergen (1838-39) on a research trip aboard the French research corvette La Recherche led by Paul Gaimard (1793-1848). In 1840 he was made a member of the Danish Academy of Sciences and joined the research frigate Bellona to South America. This research contributed to his main work Danmarks Fiske ("The Fish of Denmark", 3 volumes, 1838–1853). Krøyer also founded the journal Naturhistorisk tidsskrift in 1836, for which he served as editor and to which he contributed numerous articles. He not only studied the fish but also examined their endo and ecto parasites. He published on parasitic crustaceans in 1837-38. In 1842 he was given an honorary doctorate by the University of Rostock. From 1843 he worked with the Royal Museum of Natural History. He also taught at the Veterinary School. During his life he visited most of the coasts of Western Europe as well as Newfoundland. But his health eventually deteriorated and in 1869 he had to take his leave of his position of head of the Natural Museum of Copenhagen which he had held since 1847. He gained the titular position of professor in 1853 although he was not a full professor. That position was taken by the much younger Japetus Steenstrup in 1846. The relationship between the two was strained. In 1849 his journal, Naturhistorisk tidsskrift, stopped receiving state support. He suffered from a spinal disorder and had to give up work in 1869.

Krøyer was made member of the French Legion of Honor in 1841 and the Leopoldina Academy made him a member in 1862.
