= Hans Ernst Krøyer =

Danish composer of the national anthem (1798–1879)

- Born: 31 January 1798; Copenhagen
- Died: 24 March 1879 (aged 81); Copenhagen
- Resting place: Assistens Cemetery
- Known for: Composer of Der er et yndigt land, the Danish national anthem
- Relatives: Henrik Nikolai Krøyer (brother)

Hans Ernst (sometimes Ernest) Krøyer (31 January 1798 – 24 March 1879) was a Danish composer.

Krøyer was born in Copenhagen and the son of Bernt Anker Krøyer and Johanne Margrethe (née Schrøder), as well as the brother of Henrik Nikolai Krøyer.

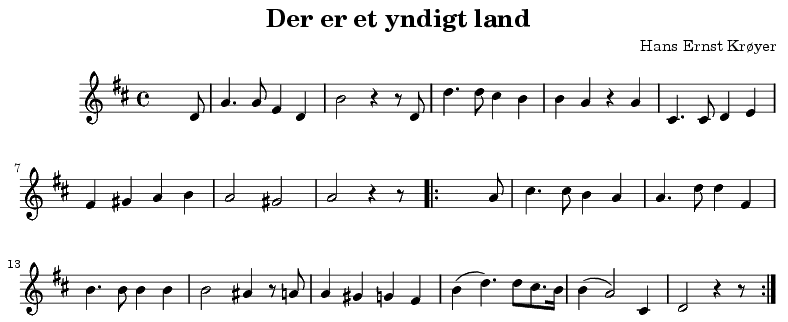
Der er et yndigt land

He is best remembered as the composer of today's Danish national anthem, "Der er et yndigt land" ("There is a Lovely Country"), in 1835, after lyrics by Adam Oehlenschläger.

He became cantor at the Royal Singers of the Chapel of Christiansborg castle in Copenhagen in 1844.

Krøyer died in Copenhagen.
