= God Defend New Zealand =

One of two national anthems of New Zealand

- National anthem of New Zealand
- Also known as: "Aotearoa" (Māori version) (English: "New Zealand")
- Lyrics: Thomas Bracken, 1870s (English); Thomas Henry Smith, 1878 (Māori)
- Music: John Joseph Woods, 1876
- Adopted: 1940 (as national hymn); 1977 (as national anthem)

Audio sample
- "God Defend New Zealand" (instrumental): file; help

"God Defend New Zealand" (Māori: "Aotearoa", (Note: Māori pronunciation: [aɔˈtearɔa]) meaning 'New Zealand') is one of two national anthems of New Zealand, the other being "God Save the King". Legally the two have equal status, but "God Defend New Zealand" is more commonly used. Originally written as a poem, it was set to music as part of a competition in 1876. Over the years its popularity increased, and it was eventually named the second national anthem in 1977. It has English and Māori lyrics, with slightly different meanings. Since the late 1990s, the usual practice when performed in public is to perform the first verse of the national anthem twice, first in Māori and then in English.

== History and performance ==
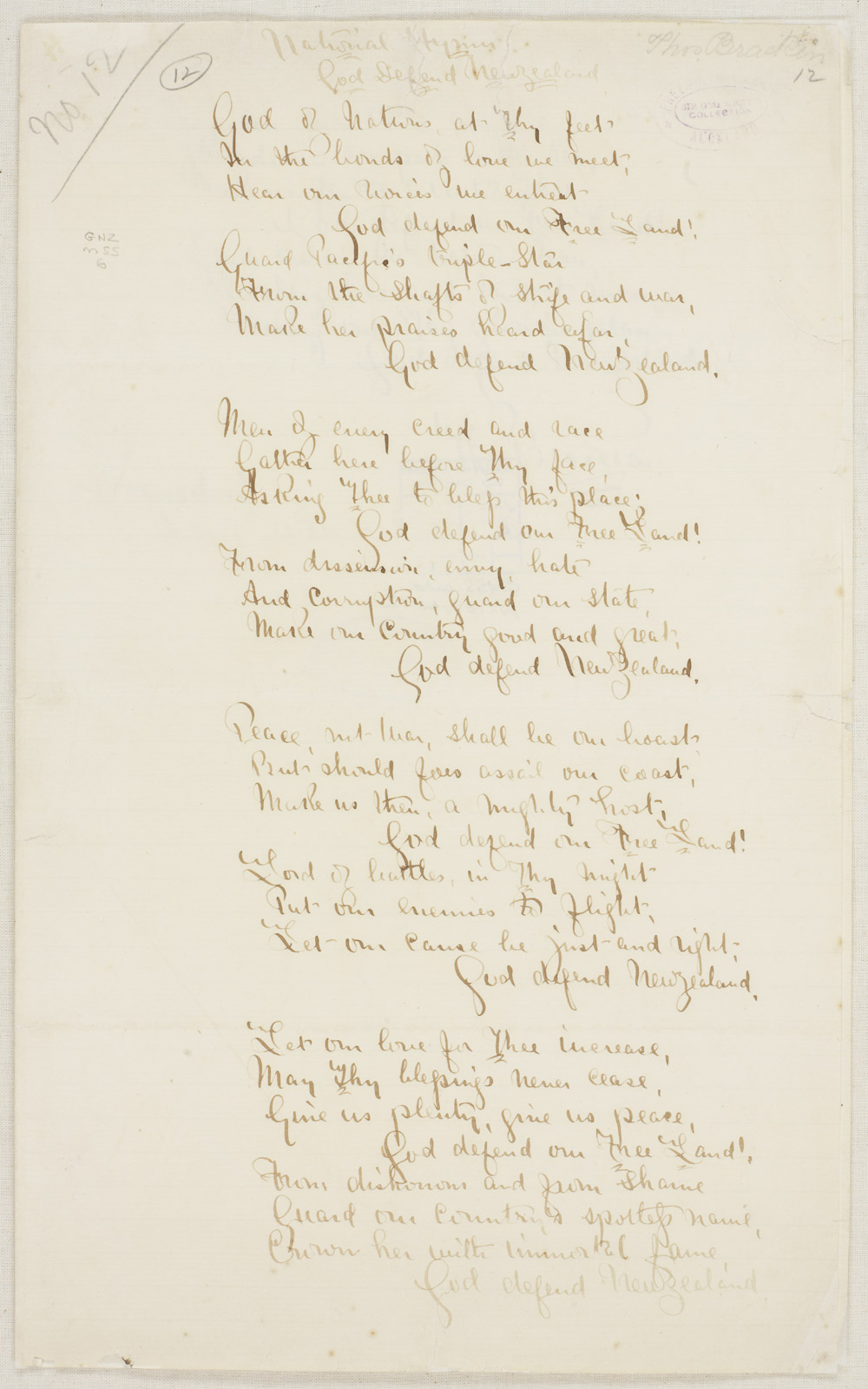
Original manuscript of words for "God Defend New Zealand" by Thomas Bracken

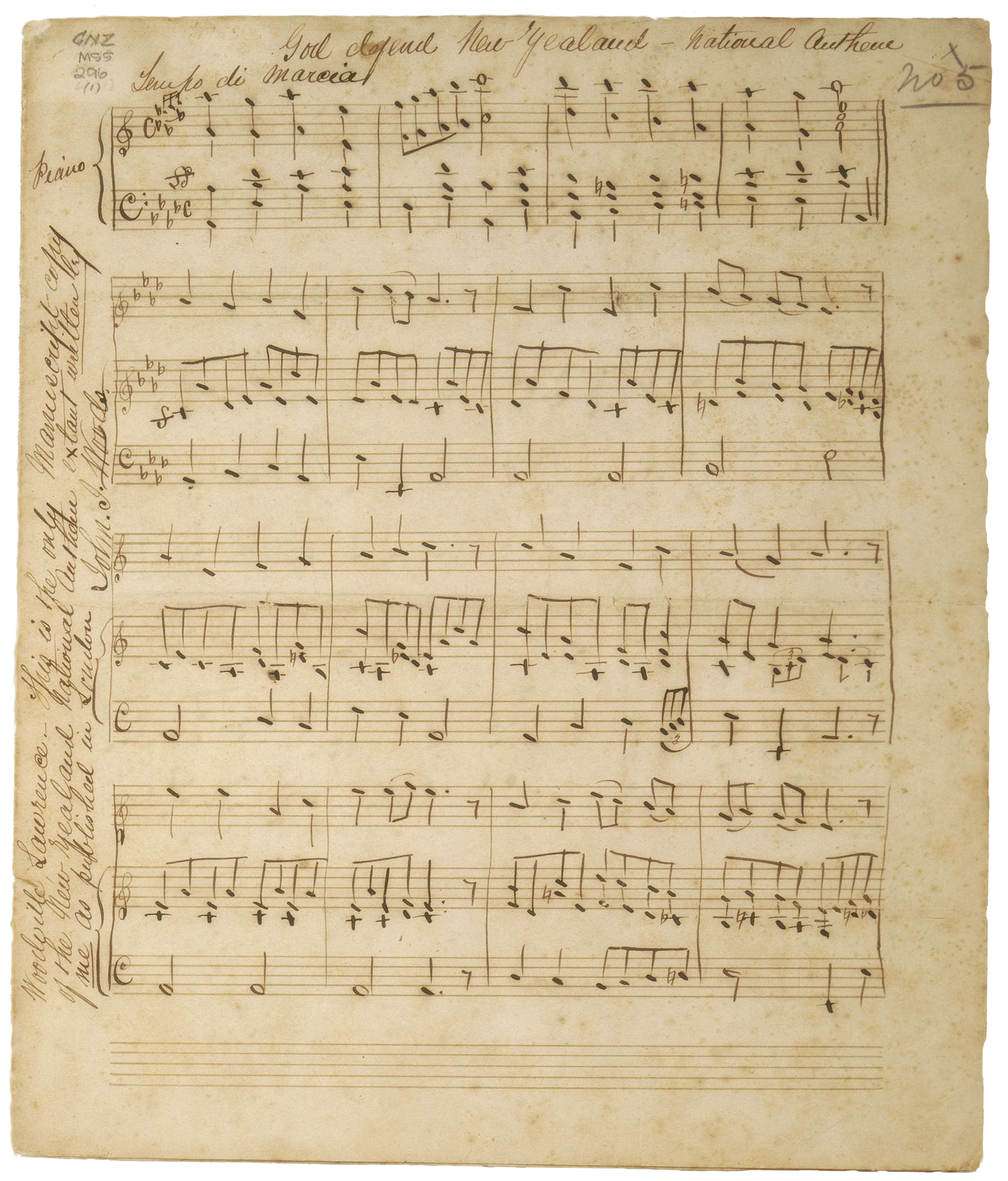
First page of Woods' original manuscript setting Bracken's poem to music

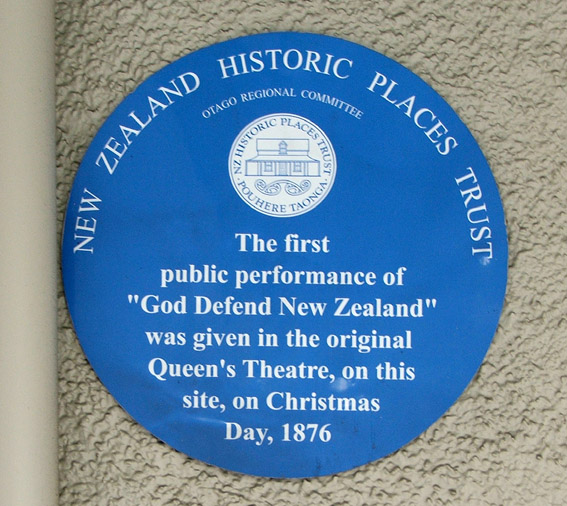
Heritage New Zealand blue plaque at the site of the first performance in Dunedin

"God Defend New Zealand" was written as a poem in the 1870s by Irish-born, Victorian-raised immigrant Thomas Bracken of Dunedin. A competition to compose music for the poem was held in 1876 by The Saturday Advertiser and judged by three prominent Melbourne musicians, with a prize of ten guineas. The winner of the competition was the Vandemonian-born John Joseph Woods of Lawrence, Otago, who composed the melody in a single sitting the evening after finding out about the competition. The song was first performed at the Queen's Theatre, Princes Street in Dunedin, on Christmas Day, 1876. In February 1878, sheet music was published.

A Māori version of the song was produced in 1878 by Thomas Henry Smith of Auckland, a judge in the Native Land Court, on request of Premier George Edward Grey. A copy of the Māori lyrics, using Aotearoa for its title, was printed in Otago newspapers in October 1878.

In 1897, Premier Richard Seddon presented a copy of words and music to Queen Victoria. The song became increasingly popular during the early 20th century, and in 1940 the New Zealand government bought the copyright and made it New Zealand's 'national hymn' in time for that year's centennial celebrations. It was used at the British Empire Games from 1950 onwards, and first used at the Olympics during the 1952 Summer Olympics, when both it and God Save the King was played following Yvette Williams' victory in the 1952 long jump. It next played during the 1972 Summer Olympics in Munich. (Note: When New Zealand's rowing eight collected their gold medals at the Munich games, the band played "God Defend New Zealand" instead of "God Save the Queen". As it was not yet a national anthem, this contravened Olympic rules, and there has been no explanation of why it happened. The crew of the eight standing on the victory dais overcome with emotion and "bawling like babies" is considered one of New Zealand's most memorable sporting moments.) Following the performance at the Munich games, a campaign began to have the song adopted as the national anthem.

"God Save the Queen" was New Zealand's sole national anthem until the 1970s. In May 1973 a remit to change the New Zealand flag, declare a New Zealand republic and change the national anthem was voted down by the Labour Party at their national conference. When the New Zealand Broadcasting Corporation was dissolved and its television channel became Television One on 1 April 1975, it opted to begin transmission with a video of children on a hilltop singing the anthem, but still closed transmission with "God Save the Queen". Network controller Bill Munro took an informal decision to replace the British anthem at closedown with the New Zealand one, under the grounds that "television has to be a constantly changing thing". In 1976 Garth Henry Latta from Dunedin presented a petition to Parliament asking "God Defend New Zealand" to be made the national anthem. With the consent of Queen Elizabeth II, the government of Robert Muldoon gazetted the song as the country's second national anthem on 21 November 1977, on equal standing with "God Save the Queen".

An alternative official arrangement for massed singing by Maxwell Fernie was announced by the Minister of Internal Affairs, Allan Highet on 31 May 1979. Woods' original score was written in the key of A-flat major and was better suited for solo and choral singing; Fernie's arrangement changed the key down a semitone to G major.

Until the 1990s, only the first verse of the English version was commonly sung. The first public singing of the anthem in both Maori and English was by singers Vicky Lee and Cyndi Joe at the Kiwis-Britain league test in 1992. A public debate emerged after only the first Māori verse was sung by Hinewehi Mohi at the 1999 Rugby World Cup match between the All Blacks and England, and it then became conventional to sing both the Māori and English first verses one after the other. In bilingual renditions, musical arrangements often emphasise the repeated (usually English) verse by adding extra layers of instrumentation or harmonies, or by modulating to a higher key.

=== The New Zealand Expo 88 Song ===
In 1987 Alan Slater produced a new arrangement of the song, having been commissioned to do so by the Department of Internal Affairs, which was used for Expo 88 in Brisbane. It was titled The New Zealand Expo Song and consisted of the first verse in Māori sung by Annie Crummer, the second verse in English sung by Peter Morgan, the fourth verse in Māori sung by Dalvanius Prime and the Pātea Māori Club, the fifth verse in English sung by Crummer and Morgan, and finally the first verse in English sung by everybody. The singers were backed by the NZ Youth Jazz Orchestra. The third verse was omitted. This version was played, accompanied by a video montage of New Zealand scenes, animals, plants etc, as TVNZ's transmission opening from the second quarter of 1988 right through to 1995. It was last played at the end of 18 March 1995, as from the following day, TV One became a 24-hour channel.

Upon adoption, Slater thought that a majority of the population liked the up-tempo version, but there was some criticism emerging from it, especially among older people.

== Protocol ==
The Ministry for Culture and Heritage has responsibility for the national anthems. The guidelines in the 1977 Gazette notice for choosing which anthem should be used on any occasion advise that the royal anthem would be appropriate at any occasion where the monarch, a member of the royal family or the governor-general is officially present, or when loyalty to the Crown is to be stressed; while "God Defend New Zealand" would be appropriate whenever the national identity of New Zealand is to be stressed, even in association with a toast to the reigning head of state. There are no regulations governing the performance of "God Defend New Zealand", leaving citizens to exercise their best judgment. When it is performed at an event, etiquette is for the audience to stand during the performance.

== Copyright ==
Copyright on the English lyrics for "God Defend New Zealand" expired from the end of the year that was 50 years after the death of the author (Bracken), that is, from 1 January 1949. The rights to the musical score passed into the public domain in the 1980s.

== Legacy ==
In 2013, the original score and lyrics for "God Defend New Zealand" were added to the UNESCO Memory of the World Aotearoa New Zealand Ngā Mahara o te Ao register. The physical documents are stored at the Auckland Central City Library.

== Lyrics ==
The anthem has five verses, each in English and Māori. The Māori version is not a direct translation of the English version.

The underlying structure of the piece is a prayer or invocation to God, with the refrain "God defend New Zealand" (in English).

| | English God Defend New Zealand | Māori Aotearoa | IPA transcription (Note: See Help:IPA/Maori.) | Literal translation of the Māori text |
|---|---|---|---|---|
| 1. | God of Nations at Thy feet, In the bonds of love we meet, Hear our voices, we entreat, God defend our free land. Guard Pacific's triple star From the shafts of strife and war, Make her praises heard afar, God defend New Zealand. | E Ihowā Atua, O ngā iwi mātou rā Āta whakarangona; (Note: Often sung as whakarongona); Me aroha noa. Kia hua ko te pai; Kia tau tō atawhai; Manaakitia mai Aotearoa | [ˈe iˌhowaː ˈatuˌa] [ˈo ŋaː ˌiwi ˈmaːtou ˌɾaː] [ˈaːta ˌɸakaˈɾaŋona] (Note: Often sung as [ˌɸakaˈɾoŋona]) [ˈme aˌɾoha ˈnoa] [ˈkia ˌhua ˈko te ˌpai] [ˈkia ˌtau toː ˈataˌɸai] [ˈmanaˌakiˈtia ˌmai] [ˈaoˌteaˈɾoa] | O Jehovah, God, Of the peoples we are Listen to us, Show mercy to us May goodness flourish, May your blessings flow Care for New Zealand |
| 2. | Men of every creed and race, Gather here before Thy face, Asking Thee to bless this place, God defend our free land. From dissension, envy, hate, And corruption guard our state, Make our country good and great, God defend New Zealand. | Ōna mano tāngata Kiri whero, kiri mā, Iwi Māori, Pākehā, Rūpeke katoa, Nei ka tono ko ngā hē Māu e whakaahu kē, Kia ora mārire Aotearoa | [ˈoːna ˌmano ˈtaːŋaˌta] [ˈkiɾi ˌɸeɾo | ˈkiɾi ˌmaː] [ˈiwi ˌmaːo.ɾi | ̍paːkehaː] [ˈɾuːpeˌke kaˈtoa] [ˈnei ka ˌtono ˈko ŋaː ˌheː] [ˈmaːu e ˌɸakaˈahu ˌkeː] [ˈkia ˌoɾa ˈmaːɾiˌɾe] [ˈaoˌteaˈɾoa] | Let all people, Red-skinned or white-skinned, Māori or Pākehā; Gather before you May all our wrongs, we pray, Be forgiven Live in peace New Zealand |
| 3. | Peace, not war, shall be our boast, But, should foes assail our coast, Make us then a mighty host, God defend our free land. Lord of battles in Thy might, Put our enemies to flight, Let our cause be just and right, God defend New Zealand. | Tōna mana kia tū Tōna kaha kia ū; Tōna rongo hei pakū Ki te ao katoa Aua rawa ngā whawhai Ngā tutū e tata mai; Kia tupu nui ai Aotearoa | [ˈtoːna ˌmana ˈkia ˌtuː] [ˈtoːna ˌkaha ˈkia ˌuː] [ˈtoːna ˌɾoŋo ˈhei paˌkuː] [ˈki te ˌao kaˈtoa] [ˈaua ˌɾawa ˈŋaː ɸaˌɸai] [ˈŋaː tuˌtuː e ˈtata ˌmai] [ˈkia ˌtupu ˈnui ˌai] [ˈaoˌteaˈɾoa] | May it be forever prestigious, May it go from strength to strength, May its fame spread far and wide, To the whole world Let not strife Nor dissension ensue, May it ever be great New Zealand |
| 4. | Let our love for Thee increase, May Thy blessings never cease, Give us plenty, give us peace, God defend our free land. From dishonour and from shame, Guard our country's spotless name, Crown her with immortal fame, God defend New Zealand. | Waiho tona takiwā Ko te ao mārama; Kia whiti tōna rā Taiāwhio noa. Ko te hae me te ngangau Meinga kia kore kau; Waiho i te rongo mau Aotearoa | [ˈwaiho ˌtona ˈtakiˌwaː] [ˈko te ˌa.o ˈmaːɾaˌma] [ˈkia ˌɸiti ˈtoːna ɾaː] [ˈtai.aːˌɸio ˈnoa] [ˈko te ˌhae me ˈte ŋaˌŋau] [ˈmeiŋa ˌkia ˈkoɾe ˌkau] [ˈwaiho ˌi te ˈɾoŋo ˌmau] [ˈaoˌteaˈɾoa] | Let its territory Be ever enlightened Throughout the land Circling here Let envy and dissension Be dispelled, Let peace reign over New Zealand |
| 5. | May our mountains ever be Freedom's ramparts on the sea, Make us faithful unto Thee, God defend our free land. Guide her in the nations' van, Preaching love and truth to man, Working out Thy glorious plan, God defend New Zealand. | Tōna pai me toitū Tika rawa, pono pū; Tōna noho, tāna tū; Iwi nō Ihowā. Kaua mōna whakamā; Kia hau te ingoa; Kia tū hei tauira; Aotearoa | [ˈtoːna ˌpai me ˈto.iˌtuː] [ˈtika ˌɾawa | ˈpono ˌpuː] [ˈtoːna ˌnoho | ˈtaːna ˌtuː] [ˈiwi ˌnoː iˈhowaː] [ˈkaua ˌmoːna ˈɸakaˌmaː] [ˈkia ˌhau te ˈiŋoˌa] [ˈkia ˌtuː hei ˈtau.iˌɾa] [ˈaoˌteaˈɾoa] | Let its good features endure, Let righteousness and honesty prevail Be standing, be sitting Among the people of God; Let it never be ashamed, But rather, let its name be known Thereby becoming the model to emulate New Zealand |

=== "Pacific's triple star" ===
There is some discussion, with no official explanation, of the meaning of "Pacific's triple star". Unofficial explanations range from New Zealand's three biggest islands (North, South, and Stewart Island), to the three stars on the flag of Te Kooti (a Māori political and religious leader of the 19th century).

=== Spelling of whakarangona ===
The original 1878 Māori version uses whakarangona (to be heard), the passive form of the verb whakarongo (to hear). An alternate form of the verb, whakarongona, first appeared as one of several errors in the Māori version when God Defend New Zealand was published as the national hymn in 1940. The latter form has appeared in many versions of the anthem since this time, although the Ministry of Culture and Heritage continues to use whakarangona.

== Criticism ==
Both the lyrics and melody of "God Defend New Zealand" have been criticised in some quarters. Many of the words and concepts have been perceived as antiquated or obscure: for example, "thy", "thee", "ramparts", "assail" and "nations' van". It was perceived as being difficult to sing at the original pitch. However, no widely acceptable replacement has been found, and "God Defend New Zealand" has not faced major opposition.
