= Ditlev Ludvig Rogert =

Danish songwriter (1742–1813)

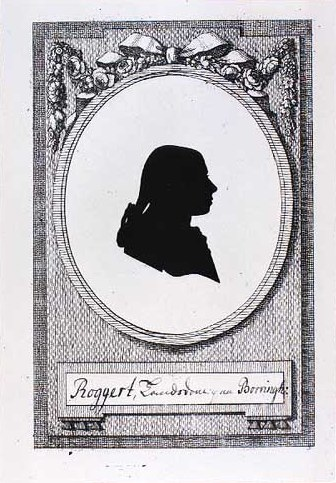
Ditlev Ludvig Rogert (1742-1813), Danish judge and violinist

Ditlev (or Ditlef) Ludvig Rogert (1742–1813) was a Danish songwriter who is credited with composing the music for Denmark's royal anthem "Kong Christian stod ved højen mast". He was also a High Court judge and violinist.

The lyrics to the anthem first appeared in May 1778, in Johannes Ewald's vaudeville play, The Fishermen. It has long been debated who composed the music to the song. It was originally accredited to Johann Hartmann, the same composer who wrote the score for The Fishermen; however his original romantic score for the vaudeville was entirely different from the score commonly used today. Following the dismissal of the possibility that Hartmann could have composed the score, it was suggested that Rogert had been the original composer, a claim that was backed up by several 19th-century intellectuals. In 1880, Vilhelm Carl Ravn presented his theory that the score significantly preceded Ewald's poem and had no one particular composer. This is the most commonly supported theory today. The song was adopted as a national anthem in 1780.
