= Lulu (Kuhlau opera) =

1824 opera by Friedrich Kuhlau

Lulu is an 1824 opera by Friedrich Kuhlau to a Danish libretto by Christian Carl Herman Frederik Güntelberg (1791–1842) based upon the fairy tale Lulu oder die Zauberflöte (1789) by August Jacob Liebeskind (1758–1793), son-in-law of Christoph Martin Wieland. This is the same story that Schikaneder turned into the libretto for Mozart's Die Zauberflöte. The opera was last performed 1838, and not revived until a 1988 recording. In 2018 it was staged at the Royal Danish Opera.

== Plot ==
Periferihme, queen of the fairies, entrusts to Prince Lulu the task of rescuing her daughter Sidi, from the wizard Dilfeng. As in Mozart the prince is given a magic flute.

== Recording ==
Lulu - Barca: Erik Harbo (tenor), Dilfeng: Ulrik Cold, An elf: Hördis Jacobsen, Witches: Brigitte Fischer, Hanne Övved, Hedwig Rummel, Lulu: Risto Saarman (tenor), Periferihme: Lane Lind, A shepherd: Kim von Binzer, Black elf: Bodil Oland, Sidi: Anne Frellesvig, Vela: Tina Kiberg Danish National Radio Symphony Orchestra, Michael Schønwandt Kontrapunkt 1988, 3CD
