= Henning Jakob Henrik Lund =

Greenlandic Lutheran pastor, poet and painter (1875–1948)

- Intel'eraq
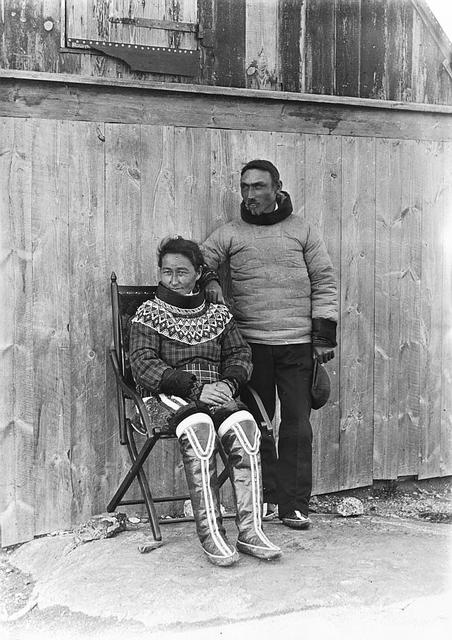
- Henrik Lund with wife, Malene, 1911. Photo by Frederik Carl Peter Rüttel
- Born: September 29, 1875; Nanortalik, Greenland
- Died: June 17, 1948 (aged 72); Narssaq, Greenland
- Occupations: pastor, painter, and lyricist
- Employer: Church of Denmark
- Notable work: "Nunarput, utoqqarsuanngoravit"
- Title: Reverend
- Spouse: Malene Lund

Henning Jakob Henrik Lund or Intel'eraq (1875–1948) was a Greenlandic lyricist, painter, and Lutheran pastor. He wrote the lyrics to "Nunarput, utoqqarsuanngoravit," in the Indigenous Greenlandic language, an Eskimo–Aleut language. The song was adopted as the national anthem of Greenland.

== Background ==
Henrik Lund was born on 29 September 1875 in Nanortalik, a village on the southwest coast of Greenland. He grew up near a community of relocated East Greenlandic Inuit and, like many in his family, devoted himself to work in East Greenland. Lund was of mixed Inuit and Danish descent, described as having Greenlandic features and bluish-grey eyes. His wife was Malene Lund, who was born in 1877 and died in 1979.

He learned to love music and poetry through his family and a local German Moravian mission. His father, Isak Lund, was a head catechist and a poet, whose patriotic sentiments are evident in his works, such as the poem "Nuna Tassa Tupingnartoq" or "This Is a Wonderful Country."

== Career ==
After attending the Danish Lutheran seminary in Godthaab, Lund became the catechist at Angmagssalik in East Greenland in 1900. In 1909, he returned home to West Greenland. He was ordained as a pastor on October 9, 1936, at the Cathedral of Our Lady in Copenhagen, Denmark. Ultimately, he became the local pastor at Narssaq.

From 1923 to 1932, Lund was elected to the South Greenland provincial council. He also painted in oils and watercolor.

== Poetry and song ==
He composed hymns in the Greenlandic language, which were published in 1909, 1930, 1937, and 1945. The second issue of a Greenlandic songbook, Erinarssûtit features his first published poetry, including "Upernalermat" or "As Spring Is Coming." Later issues of this songbook include more of his poetry–some secular in nature. His poems can be classified as epic or didactic. One poem, "Igdlugssaq Nápagaungmat" or "When the House Was Built," details the seemingly minor event of constructing a home in Angmagssalik. While not overtly heroic, this action will be useful and demonstrated community affection. In "Nunat Asingagingmata" or "When the Countries Again Turned Pale," Lund writes: "We will soon see the country covered with snow, dressed in the garment of the sorrow, and crying in the storm after having bidden good-bye to all the small birds."

=== National anthem ===
Lund's patriotic poem, "Nunarput Utoqqarsuanngoravit" or "Our Country Who's Become So Old," was written in 1912 and later set to music by Jonathan Petersen (1891–1960). The song was adopted as the national anthem of Greenland in 1916. The lyrics translated from the Greenlandic language into English prose are:

1. Our country, when you grew very old, your head was crowned with white hair. You carried steadfast your children in your arms and gave them what belonged to your coastland.
2. We who here grew up with you as an immature people, as small children, we want to call ourselves kalâtdlit in front of your honorable head!
3. And making use of all that belongs to you, we feel a desire to advance: bettering the conditions, which hold you back, we are firmly resolved to go forward, forward.
4. We want very much to follow the mature people. We are longing to use the freedom of speech and press!
5. There is not at all the slightest reason for holding back. Greenlanders, stand up on your feet, forward! It is well worth to live as men. Show that you can think for yourselves!

This song can be interpreted as being assimilationist in tone and certainly has European influences; however, it also reflects the stirring of national consciousness of early 20th century Greenland. Village and tribal loyalties expanded to encompass the entire country, Kalaallit Nunaat. Since 1979, "Nuna asiilasooq" (The Land of Great Length), an anthem used by the self-governing Kalaallit people, has additionally been officially recognized by the government. Jonathan Petersen wrote both the lyrics and melody.

== Honors ==
The Danish king awarded him the two orders: Dannebrogsmændenes Hæderstegn and Ingenio et Arti. Henrik and Malene Lund's House, also known as Lund Cottage, built after Lund's own design in Narsaq, became a memorial in 1980 and is open to the public as part of the Narsaq Museum.

== Death ==
Lund died on June 17, 1948, in Narssaq, Greenland.
