= Thomas Henry Smith (poet) =

Famous poet and judge from New Zealand (1824–1907)

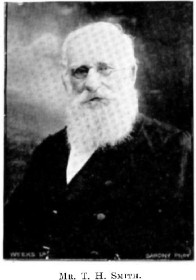
- Born: 22 November 1824; Stroud, Gloucestershire, England, United Kingdom
- Died: 23 September 1907 (aged 82); Colony of New Zealand
- Citizenship: British (1824-1842), New Zealander(1842-1907)
- Occupations: Judge, poet
- Spouse(s): Elizabeth Koka Fuloon; Dorcas Sophia Baker
- Writing career
- Notable work: God Defend New Zealand

Thomas Henry Smith (22 November 1824 – 23 September 1907) of Auckland was an English-born New Zealand Native Land Court Judge and poet. He is best known for the Māori language translation of "God Defend New Zealand", one of the two national anthems of New Zealand, which he wrote at the request of Governor George Edward Grey.

== Early life ==
Smith was born at Stroud, Gloucestershire, England. After his formal education he worked at a Land Surveying and Architecture office in Romford, Essex. In 1842, he went to New Zealand after being offered a cadetship by the New Zealand Company's surveying staff.
