= Jonathan Petersen =

Greenlandic songwriter, composer of the national anthem (1881–1961)

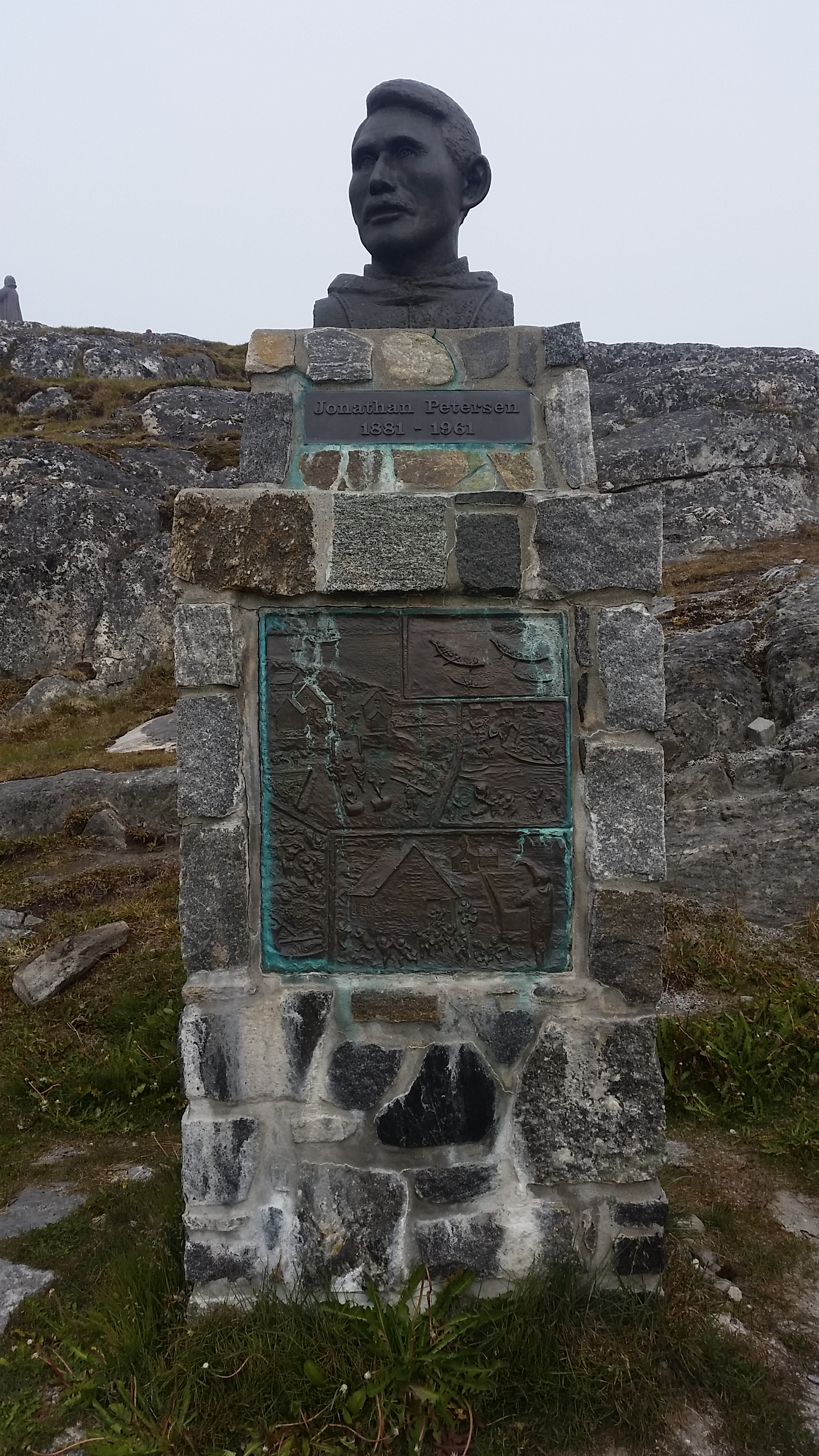

Jonathan Petersen (7 May 1881 – 22 August 1961) was a Greenlandic songwriter. He composed the music to the national anthem of Greenland, Nunarput utoqqarsuanngoravit (Our Country, Who's Become So Old in English) and the lyrics and music of the secondary national anthem Nuna asiilasooq ("A Huge Rocky Land" in English). The lyrics to the older anthem were written by the Greenlandic pastor Henrik Lund, and the song was adopted as the national anthem in 1916. Since home rule was granted in 1979, the newer anthem has been used.
