= Elves' Hill =

1828 comedy play by Johan Ludvig Heiberg

- Original language: Danish
- Written by: Johan Ludvig Heiberg
- Genre: Comedy
- Setting: Stevns

Premiere
- Date: 6 November 1828

Elves' Hill (Danish: Elverhøj) is a comedy by Johan Ludvig Heiberg, with overture and incidental music by Friedrich Kuhlau (Op. 100), which is considered the first Danish national play.

== History ==
Elves' Hill was commissioned by Frederik VI for the wedding of his daughter Vilhelmine Marie and Frederik Carl Christian (later Frederik VII) and premiered on 6 November 1828, 5 days after the wedding. Since the premiere, the play has been performed more than 1,000 times at the Royal Danish Theatre.

== Story ==
The work incorporated both the texts and melodies of two traditional ballad pieces featuring folklore about the Elven king. Heiberg localized the legend of the Elven king to Stevns. To these, the motif element of the swapped children was added. King Christian IV is cast as a sort of detective, who unravels the mystery.

== Music ==
Jeg gik mig i lunden ("I went into the grove")
Performed on piano by Erik Damskier, without lyrics (0:23)

Dybt i havet ("Deep in the sea")
Performed on piano by Erik Damskier, without lyrics (0:41)

The two ballads used were Elvehøj (DgF 46B) which begins "Jeg lagde mit hoved til Elverhøj" (I laid my head down on Elves' Hill)" and Elveskud (DgF 47B) that begins "Herr Oluf han rider saa vide" (Sir Oluf he rideth so far-and-wide). These ballads had appeared in Udvalgte Danske Viser fra Middelalderen (1812), edited by Werner Abrahamson.

The work also contains "Kong Christian stod ved højen mast", which became the royal anthem of Denmark. It is set to Kuhlau's arrangement to a tune already being sung to the lyrics originally written by Johannes Ewald for an entirely different play.
