= Nunarput utoqqarsuanngoravit =

Co-national anthem of Greenland

English: Our Ancient Land
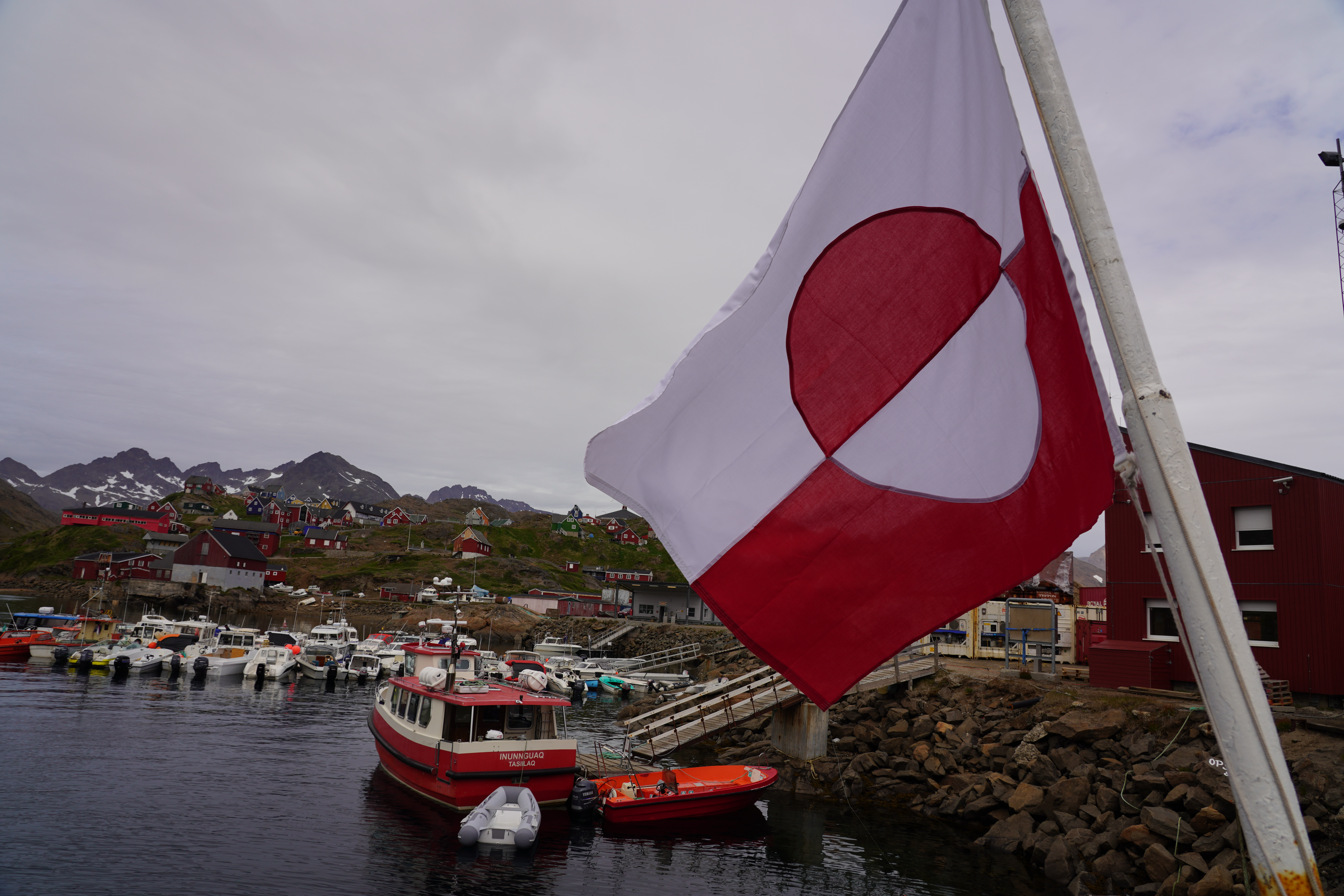
- Co-national anthem of Greenland
- Lyrics: Henning Jakob Henrik Lund, 1912
- Music: Jonathan Petersen, 1937
- Adopted: 1916; 110 years ago

Audio sample
- 1977 choral vocal recording (first verse): file; help

"Nunarput utoqqarsuanngoravit" (Greenlandic: [nʉnɑpːut‿ʉtɔq:ɑs:uaŋːɔʁavit]; Danish: "Vort ældgamle land", [vɒt ˈelˌkɑmlə lænˀ ɔn⁽ˀ⁾ɐ ˈiˀsˌple̝ŋkn̩s pɑwˀn]; English: "Our Ancient Land") is the national anthem of Greenland, an autonomous territory of the Kingdom of Denmark. Written by Henning Jakob Henrik Lund in 1912, it was officially adopted in 1916. Music for it was later composed by Jonathan Petersen in 1937.

The reference to Kalaallit as "half-grown children" yearning to join the "advanced nations" of the world has been considered controversial in modern times. Since 1979, "Nuna asiilasooq" ("The Land of Great Length"), an ethnic anthem used by the self-governing Kalaallit, has also been officially recognised by the government.

== History ==
The song was written in 1912 by Greenlandic priest Henning Jakob Henrik Lund, originally set to the melody of the Swedish national anthem, "Du gamla, du fria". It was one of the first Greenlandic national songs and has been suggested to have been written as a national battle song for politicians pushing for a bill on home rule.

In 1937, organist and piano teacher Jonathan Petersen composed a melody for the anthem. In 1916, it was translated into Danish by Eskimologist William Thalbitzer. It was the only Greenlandic song translated into Danish, and remained so for many years, and as such was given official status as the national anthem of Greenland by Denmark. It was performed in this role at the University of Copenhagen in 1921 for the 200th anniversary of missionary Hans Egede's landing in Greenland and in 1937 for King Christian X's 25-year jubilee. In 1985, Thalbitzer's Danish translation was refined by theologian Mads Lidegaard.

== Lyrics ==
The fifth verse is more often sung after the first verse than the second verse in short versions.

Greenlandic lyrics

I
Nunarput utoqqarsuanngoravit
Niaqqut ulissimavoq qiinik.
Qitornatit kissumiaannarpatit
Tunillugit sineriavit piinik.

II
Akullequtaasutut merlertutut
Ilinni perortugut tamaani
Kalaallinik imminik taajumavugut
Niaqquit ataqqinartup saani.

III
Atortillugillu tamaasa pisit
ingerlaniarusuleqaagut,
nutarterlugillu noqitsigisatit
siumut, siumut piumaqaagut.

IV
Inersimalersut ingerlanerat
tungaalittiterusuleqaarput,
oqaatsit "aviisit" qanoq kingunerat
atussasoq erinigileqaarput.

V
Taqilluni naami atunngiveqaaq,
kalaallit siumut makigitsi.
Inuttut inuuneq pigiuminaqaaq,
saperasi isumaqaleritsi.

IPA transcription (Note: See Help:IPA and Greenlandic language § Phonology.)

1
[nʉ.nɑp.put‿ʉ.tɔq.qɑs.su.aŋ.ŋo.ʁa.vit]
[ni.ɑq.qut‿ʉ.lis.sy.ma.vɔq qiː.nik]
[qi.tɔn.na.tˢit kis.su.mi.aːn.nɑp.pa.tˢit]
[tʉ.niɬ.ɬu.ɣit si.nə.ʁi.a.vit piː.nik]

2
[a.kuɬ.ɬə.qu.taː.sʉ.tʉt məɬ.ɬət.tʉ.tʉt]
[i.lin.ni pə.ʁɔt.tu.ɣut ta.maː.ni]
[ka.laːɬ.ɬi.nik ym.mi.nik taː.ju.ma.vu.ɣut]
[ni.ɑq.qu.it a.tɑq.qi.nɑt.tup saː.ni]

3
[a.tɔt.tˢiɬ.ɬu.ɣiɬ.ɬu ta.maː.sa pi.sit]
[i.ŋəɬ.ɬa.ni.ɑ.ʁu.sʉ.lə.qaː.ɣut]
[nʉ.tɑt.təɬ.ɬu.ɣiɬ.ɬu nɔ.qit.tˢi.ɣi.sa.tˢit]
[si.u.mut si.u.mut pi.u.mɑ.qaː.ɣut]

4
[i.nəs.sy.ma.ləs.sʉt i.ŋəɬ.ɬa.nə.ʁat]
[tu.ŋaː.lit.tˢi.tə.ʁu.sʉ.lə.qɑːp.put]
[ɔ.qaːt.tˢit a.viː.sit qa.nɔq ki.ŋu.nə.ʁat]
[a.tʉs.sa.sɔq ə.ʁi.ni.ɣi.lə.qɑːp.put]

5
[tɑ.qiɬ.ɬʉ.ni naː.mi a.tuŋ.ŋi.və.qɑːq]
[ka.laːɬ.ɬit si.u.mut ma.ki.ɣit.tˢi]
[i.nʉt.tʉt i.nʉː.nəq pi.ɣi.u.mi.nɑ.qɑːq]
[sa.pə.ʁa.si i.su.mɑ.qa.lə.ʁit.tˢi]

1916 Danish translation
(by William Thalbitzer)

I
Vort ældgamle land under isblinkens bavn
med lysende snehår om dit hoved!
Du trofaste moder, som bar os i din favn,
mens dine kysters havvildt os du loved.

II
Som umodne børn er vi grot av din jord,
hos dig voxet op, blandt dine fjælde.
Vort navn er Kalâtdlit, i sagnets dybe spor
ærværdigt for dit hvide åsyns ælde.

III
Og alt mens din rigdom blev brugt til vor gavn,
vi længtes mod verdens nye former.
Forløst fra de snærende bånd i hjemmets stavn
nu fremad, frem mod fjærne mål vi stormer.

IV
I voxne nasjoner, stræk ud jeres hånd!
Jert spor vi nu længes snart at følge.
En verden av bøger skal mane frem den ånd,
som bær os op på nykulturens bølge.

V
Umuligt nu længer at dvæle i ro –
Kalâtdlit, stand op! Det ny imøde!
Som fribårne mennesker herefter vil i gro;
begynd at tro på evnens morgenrøde!

1985 Danish translation
(by Mads Lidegaard)

I
Vort ældgamle land under isblinkens bavn
med lysende snehår om dit hoved!
Du trofaste moder, som bar os i din favn
mens dine kysters rigdom du os loved.

II
Som halvvoksne børn er vi groet af din jord
og trygt vokset op blandt dine fjelde,
vi kalder os kalaallit i landet, hvor vi bor
ærbødigt for dit hvide åsyns ælde.

III
Og alt mens vi bruger dit bugnende flor
vi længes mod verdens nye former,
vi fjerner hver hindring, som hæmmer dig, vor mor
og frejdigt frem mod fjerne mål vi stormer.

IV
De fremskredne folk et eksempel os gav
og det vil vi også stræbe efter,
mens bøgernes verden er vores vandringsstav,
som bær os frem og giver nye kræfter.

V
Umuligt nu længer at blive i ro,
kalaallit, mod store mål vi stævner.
Som fribårne folk vi i landet vil bo;
begynd at tro på jeres egne evner.

Literal English translation of Lidegaard's translation

I
Our ancient land under ice glimmer's phryctoria
with glowing snow-hair around your head!
You faithful mother, who carried us in your embrace
while your shores' riches you promised us.

II
As half-grown children, we are sprouted from your soil
and safely grown up among your mountains,
we call ourselves kalaallit in the land where we live
reverently for the oldness of your white face.

III
And all while we use your abundant bloom
we long for new forms of the world,
we remove every obstacle that hinders you, our mother
and cheerfully towards distant goals we storm.

IV
The advanced people gave us an example
and we will also strive for that,
while the world of books is our walking stick,
which carries us forward and gives new strength.

V
It's impossible now to stay in rest longer,
kalaallit, towards great goals we meet.
As freeborn people we in the country will live;
start believing in your own abilities.

Poetic English translation

I
Our country, which has become so old
your head is all covered with white hair.
Always held us, your children, in your bosom
and gave us the riches of your coasts.

II
As middle children in the family
we blossomed here
Kalaallit, we want to call ourselves
before your proud and honourable head.

III
With a burning desire to develop what you have
to give, renewing,
removing your obstacles
our desire to move is forward, forward.

IV
The way of matured societies
is our zealous goal to attain;
the effect of speech and letters
we long to behold

V
Humbleness is not the course,
Kalaallit wake up and be proud!
A dignified life is our goal;
courageously take a stand
