= Nuna asiilasooq =

Co-national anthem of Greenland

- Ethnic anthem of the Kalaallit Co-national anthem of Greenland
- Lyrics: Jonathan Petersen, c. 1920
- Music: Jonathan Petersen, c. 1920
- Adopted: 1979; 47 years ago

Audio sample
- Nuna asiilasooq: file; help

"Nuna asiilasooq" (Greenlandic: [nʉna asiːlasɔːq]; Danish: "Et vældigt klippeland" [e̝t ˈve̝ltit ˈkʰle̝pəˌlænˀ], English: "A Huge Rocky Land") is a Greenlandic song used as an ethnic anthem by the self-governing Kalaallit of Greenland. It was officially recognized by the government in 1979. Both lyrics and melody were composed by Jonathan Petersen, who also wrote the musical score for Greenland's 1916-adopted national anthem "Nunarput, utoqqarsuanngoravit."

== History ==
The song was written by Greenlandic organist and piano teacher Jonathan Petersen, probably during or after a stay in Denmark in 1910–1911, during which he passed his organ exam with distinction. It was originally set to the tune of the Danish national anthem, "Der er et yndigt land". Petersen wrote an original composition for the song around 1920, which retained the repetition of the third line of each verse, as in "Der er et yndigt land".

In 1979, when home rule was granted to Greenland, the song was adopted as a national anthem, alongside "Nunarput, utoqqarsuanngoravit". In 1985, it was translated into Danish by theologian Mads Lidegaard. Both the Greenlandic and Danish versions have been published in the Højskolesangbogen.

== Lyrics ==
Greenlandic lyrics

I
Nuna asiilasooq
Kalaallit nunagaarput
𝄆 tamarmi qaqqartooq 𝄇
Kangerluppassuit sinaa
nunassaqqissisippaat,
tamaat sineriaa
qeqertat saangerpaat.

II
Nuannersoqaqaaq
angallavigigaanni
𝄆 tamaat sineriak 𝄇
Avannamut kujammullu
inunnik naapitsiffik
nunaqarfinnillu
uningavissalik.

III
Qaqqaasa saavini
kangerluillu paani
𝄆 unipput inuii 𝄇
Imartik pissaqarfigaat
atorluakkaminnik,
Kalaallimmi pigaat
soraajuerlutik!

IPA transcription (Note: See Help:IPA and Greenlandic language § Phonology.)

1
[nʉ.na a.siː.la.sɔːq]
[ka.laːɬ.ɬit nʉ.na.ɣɑːp.put]
𝄆 [ta.mɑm.me‿qɑq.qɑt.tɔːq] 𝄇
[ka.ŋəɬ.ɬup.pas.su.it si.naː]
[nʉ.nas.sɑq.qis.si.syp.paːt]
[ta.maːt si.nə.ʁi.aː]
[qə.qət.tat saː.ŋəp.paːt]

2
[nu.an.nəs.sɔ.qɑ.qɑːq]
[a.ŋaɬ.ɬa.vi.ɣi.ɣaːn.ni]
𝄆 [ta.maːt si.nə.ʁi.ak] 𝄇
[a.van.na.mut ku.jam.muɬ.ɬu]
[i.nʉn.nik naː.pit.tˢif.fik]
[nʉ.nɑ.qɑf.fin.niɬ.ɬu]
[u.ni.ŋa.vis.sa.lik]

3
[qɑq.qaː.sa saː.vi.ni]
[ka.ŋəɬ.ɬu.iɬ.ɬu paː.ni]
𝄆 [u.nyp.put i.nu.iː] 𝄇
[y.mɑt.tˢik pis.sɑ.qɑf.fi.ɣaːt]
[a.tɔɬ.ɬu.ak.ka.min.nik]
[ka.laːɬ.ɬym.my‿pi.ɣaːt]
[sɔ.ʁaː.ju.əɬ.ɬu.tˢik]

Danish translation
(by Mads Lidegaard)

I
Et vældigt klippeland
fik Grønlands folk i eje
𝄆 med fjeld fra strand til strand. 𝄇
Og ved de dybe fjordes vand
var godt at bo og bygge
og øers perlerække bandt
et bånd langs kystens rand.

II
Det er en lykke og en lyst
for dem der er på rejse
𝄆 langs landets lange kyst, 𝄇
at strejfe om fra syd til nord
og møde nye venner
hvor gæstfrihed og glæde stor
i lave hytter bor.

III
I høje fjeldes ly
hvor fjorden møder havet
𝄆 de bygged bygd og by. 𝄇
De levede med kunst og flid
af havets rige vande
– fra nu og indtil evig tid
er det kalaallits land.

English translation

I
Land of greath length,
That's what the Kalaallit have as a country,
among entire mountains,
The many fjords on the coast,
well suited as a country,
and the coast is speckled
with islands.

II
It is so beautiful
when you journey
the entire coast.
Up north and down south,
there is a meeting place for people
and wherever you have land
there is a place to live.

III
At the feet of her mountains
and the mouths of her fjords
her inhabitants meet each other.
The sea is their domain
which they treat so well
It belongs to the Kalaallit
until the end of time!
