= Kong Christian stod ved højen mast =

Royal anthem of Denmark

English: King Christian stood by the lofty mast
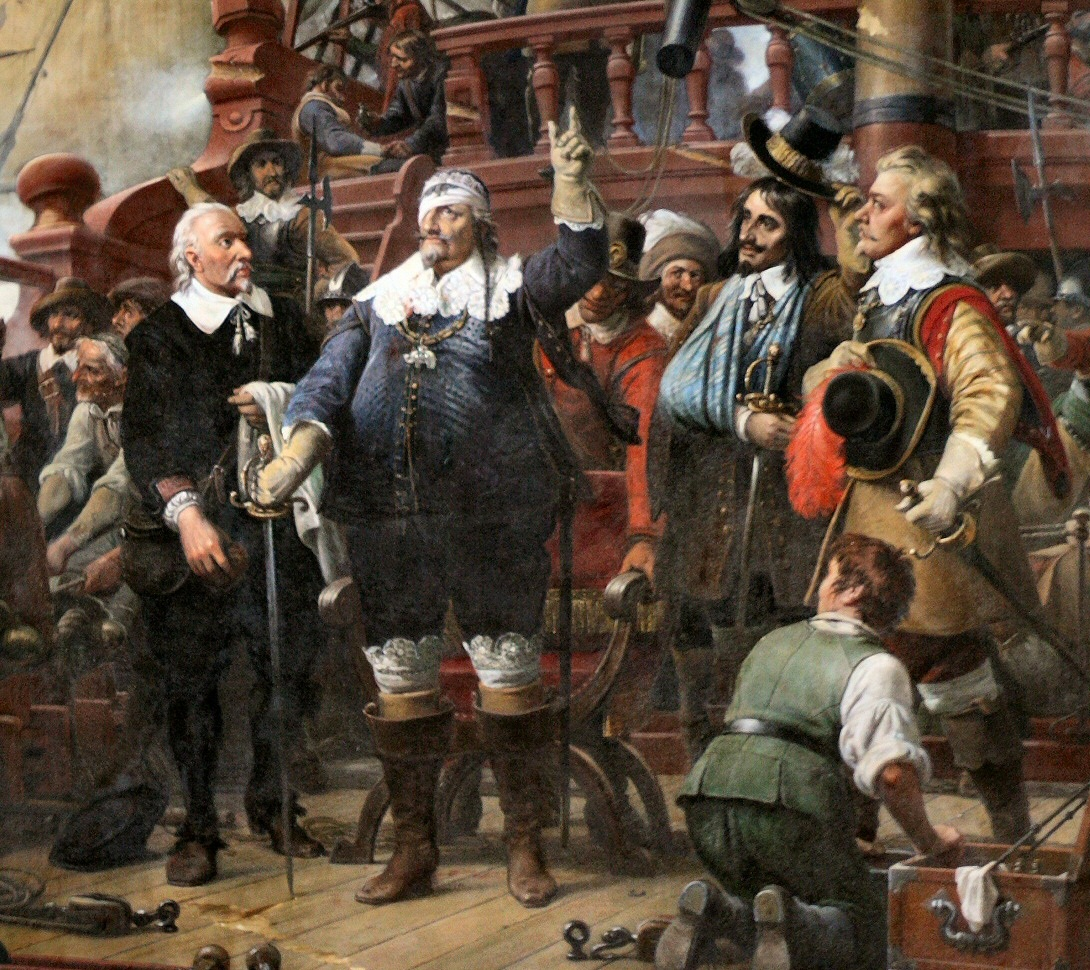
- King Christian IV in the Battle of Colberger Heide (1644) on the ship Trefoldighed (Trinity, 1866, Roskilde Cathedral) by Wilhelm Marstrand
- National and de facto royal anthem of Denmark
- Also known as: Kong Christian; Kongesangen (English: The King's Anthem)
- Lyrics: Johannes Ewald, 1778
- Music: unknown
- Adopted: 1780

Audio sample
- U.S. Navy Band instrumental rendition in B-flat major: file; help

"Kong Christian stod ved højen mast" (Danish: [kʰʌŋ ˈkʰʁestjæn ˈstoðˀ ve̝ ˈhʌjˀn̩ mæst; -ˈkʰʁæs-]; lit. 'King Christian stood by the lofty mast'), or simply "Kong Christian", is one of the two national anthems of Denmark, the other being "Der er et yndigt land". It is generally reserved for use by the Danish royal house and the military. The theme of the song is the heroics of Danish and Norwegian sailors during the wars against Sweden (including the Torstenson War) in the 17th and 18th centuries.

On New Year's Eve, it is tradition to sing along as the Danmarks Radio Girl's Choir sings the song on television immediately after midnight following the other national anthem. Usually, only the first verse is sung on official occasions. Adopted in 1780, it is one of the oldest national anthems in the world.

== History ==
=== History of the lyrics ===
The lyrics first appeared in May 1778 in Johannes Ewald's vaudeville play Fiskerne (The Fishermen), which premiered at the Royal Danish Theatre in January 1780 on the birthday of King Christian VII. The play depicts the heroics of fishermen from the northern part of Zealand, who saved many sailors from drowning and then refused to accept a reward for it. For this reason, the play was seen as a tribute to the navy, particularly because of the King Christian song. In the original staging, however, only the final fourth verse was ever sung. The first three verses were omitted because of the animosity they showed towards Sweden, which at the time was an important ally against the United Kingdom as a member of the League of Armed Neutrality.

=== Theme ===
The theme of the song is the heroics of Danish-Norwegian sailors during the wars against Sweden in the 17th and 18th centuries. It specifically names the Danish-Norwegian naval heroes King Christian IV, Niels Juel and Peter Wessel Tordenskiold. The first verse refers to the 1644 Battle of Colberger Heide, where King Christian IV was hurt by shrapnel and thought to be dead but, despite losing an eye, quickly got to his feet and incited his crew to continue the battle.

=== History of the music ===
It has long been debated who composed the song's music. Johann Hartmann, the composer who wrote the score for the original play Fiskerne, where the lyrics first appeared, was originally credited with composing the music.

Another suggestion was that Johannes Ewald's friend, High Court judge Ditlev Ludvig Rogert, known to have played the violin, had been the original composer. This claim was backed up by several 19th-century intellectuals. In 1880, Vilhelm Carl Ravn presented his theory that the score significantly preceded Ewald's poem and had no one particular composer. This is the most commonly supported theory today.

However, even today, the score is often wrongly credited to Friedrich Kuhlau. Kuhlau made "King Christian" a popular anthem by using his own arrangement of the score in his 1828 play Elverhøj (Elves' Hill), which premiered at the wedding between Crown Prince Frederik (the later King Frederik VII) and Princess Vilhelmine in November 1828.

== Lyrics ==
Danish

1. Kong Christian stod ved højen mast
i røg og damp;
hans værge hamrede så fast,
at gotens hjelm og hjerne brast.
Da sank hvert fjendtligt spejl og mast
i røg og damp.
Fly, skreg de, fly, hvad flygte kan!
𝄆 hvo står for Danmarks Christian 𝄇
i kamp?

2. Niels Juel gav agt på stormens brag.
Nu er det tid.
Han hejsede det røde flag
og slog på fjenden slag i slag.
Da skreg de højt blandt stormens brag:
Nu er det tid!
Fly, skreg de, hver, som véd et skjul!
𝄆 hvo kan bestå mod Danmarks Juel 𝄇
i strid?

3. O, Nordhav! Glimt af Wessel brød
din mørke sky.
Da ty'de kæmper til dit skød;
thi med ham lynte skræk og død.
Fra valen hørtes vrål, som brød
den tykke sky.
Fra Danmark lyner Tordenskjold;
𝄆 hver give sig i himlens vold 𝄇
og fly!

4. Du danskes vej til ros og magt,
sortladne hav!
Modtag din ven, som uforsagt
tør møde faren med foragt
så stolt som du mod stormens magt,
sortladne hav!
Og rask igennem larm og spil
𝄆 og kamp og sejr før mig til 𝄇
min grav!

IPA transcription (Note: See Help:IPA/Danish.)

[kʰɔŋ ˈkʰʁes.tjæn stoðˀ ʋeð ˈhɔ.jən mæst]
[i ʁɔjˀ ɒ(w) d̥ɑmˀp]
[hæns ˈʋɛɐ̯.wə ˈhɑm.(ʁ)ɐ.ðə sɔ fæst]
[æt ˈɡ̊oˀ.tˢəns jɛlˀm ɒ(w) ˈjɛɐ̯.nə b̥ʁæst]
[d̥æ sɑŋˀk ʋɛɐ̯ˀt ˈfjend̥.lit spɑjˀl ɒ(w) mæst]
[i ʁɔjˀ ɒ(w) d̥ɑmˀp]
[flyˀ skʁɑjˀ d̥i flyˀ ʋæð̠˕ˠ ˈfløɡ̊.tə kʰænˀ]
𝄆 [voːˀ stɒˀ fɔ ˈd̥æn.mɑks ˈkʰʁes.ti.æn] 𝄇
[i kʰɑmˀp]

[nelˀs juːl ɡ̊ɛˀʋ ɑɡ̊t pʰɔ̽ ˈstɒː.məns b̥ʁɑˀw]
[nu ɛɐ̯ d̥e tˢiˀð]
[hæn ˈhɑj.sə.ðə d̥e ˈʁøː.ðə fl̥æˀ(j)]
[ɒw sl̥oˀ pʰɔ̽ ˈfjen.nˀən ˈsl̥æˀ(j) i ˈsl̥æˀ(j)]
[d̥æ skʁɑjˀ d̥i hɔjˀt b̥lænˀt ˈstɒː.məns b̥ʁɑˀw]
[nu ɛɐ̯ d̥e tˢiˀð]
[flyˀ skʁɑjˀ d̥i ʋɛˀɐ̯ sʌm ʋeðˀ e̝t skjuˀl]
𝄆 [voːˀ kʰænˀ b̥e.ˈstɔˀ moˀð ˈd̥æn.mɑks juːl] 𝄇
[i stʁiðˀ]

[oˀ ˈnoɐ̯.hɑw ɡ̊lemˀt a ˈʋɛ.səl b̥ʁœðˀ]
[d̥iːˀn ˈmɶɐ̯.kə skyˀ]
[d̥æ tˢyː.ðə ˈkʰɛm.pɐ tˢel d̥it skøð]
[tˢi mɛð hɑ̈mˀ lyn.tə skʁæ(j)k ɒ(w) d̥øˀð]
[fʁ̥ɑ ˈʋæː.lən høɐ̯ˀ.təs ʋʁɔːˀl sɔm b̥ʁœðˀ]
[d̥ɛnˀ tˢy.kə skyˀ]
[fʁ̥ɑ ˈd̥æn.mɑk ˈlyː.nɐ ˈtˢoɐ̯.d̥ən.ˌskjʌlˀ]
𝄆 [ʋɛˀɐ̯ ˈɡ̊iː.ʋə sɑj i ˈhem.ləns ʋʌlˀ] 𝄇
[ɒw flyˀ]

[d̥u ˈd̥æns.kəs ʋɑjˀ tˢel ʁoˀs ɒ(w) mɑɡ̊t]
[ˈsoɐ̯t.ˌlæːð.nə hɑw]
[ˈmoˀð.tˢæˀ(j) d̥iːˀn ʋɛn sʌm ˈu.fɔ.ˌsɑɡ̊t]
[tˢɶɐ̯ ˈmøː.ðə ˈfɑː.ʁən mɛð fɔ.ˈɑɡ̊t]
[sʌ stɔlˀt sɔm d̥u moˀð stɒː.məns mɑɡ̊t]
[ˈsoɐ̯t.ˌlæːð.nə hɑw]
[ɒw ʁask i.ɡ̊ɛ(n).nˀəm lɑːˀm ɒ(w) spel]
𝄆 [ɒ(w) kʰɑmˀp ɒ(w) sɑjˀɐ føɐ̯ˀ mɑ(j) tˢel] 𝄇
[miːˀn ɡ̊ʁɑwˀ]

English translation
by Henry Wadsworth Longfellow

King Christian stood by the lofty mast
In mist and smoke;
His sword was hammering so fast,
Through Gothic helm and brain it passed;
Then sank each hostile hulk and mast,
In mist and smoke.
"Fly!" shouted they, "fly, he who can!
𝄆 Who braves of Denmark's Christian, 𝄇
The stroke?"

Niels Juel gave heed to the tempest's roar,
Now is the hour!
He hoisted his blood-red flag once more,
And smote upon the foe full sore,
And shouted loud, through the tempest's roar,
"Now is the hour!"
"Fly!" shouted they, "for shelter fly!
𝄆 Of Denmark's Juel who can defy, 𝄇
The power?"

North Sea! a glimpse of Wessel (Note: 'Wessel' = Peter Jansen Wessel Tordenskiold) rent
Thy murky sky!
Then champions to thine arms were sent;
Terror and Death glared where he went;
From the waves was heard a wail, that rent
The murky sky!
From Denmark thunders Tordenskiol',
𝄆 Let each to Heaven commend his soul, 𝄇
And fly!

Path of the Dane to fame and might!
Dark-rolling wave!
Receive thy friend, who, scorning flight,
Goes to meet danger with despite,
Proudly as thou the tempest's might,
Dark-rolling wave!
And 'mid pleasures and alarms,
𝄆 And war and victory, be thine arms, 𝄇
My grave!

== See also ==
- Festival Overture on the Danish National Anthem – a musical piece by Tchaikovsky composed for the visit of the tsarevich to the Moscow Conservatoire accompanied by his new Danish wife. The piece is based on "Kong Christian stod ved højen mast" but also incorporates elements of the Russian national anthem, "God Save the Tsar!".
