= Te Atua o Tokelau =

Anthem of Tokelau

English: The God of Tokelau
- Territorial anthem of Tokelau
- Also known as: Tokelau mo te Atua (English: Tokelau for God)
- Lyrics: Eric Lemuelu Falima, 2005
- Music: Eric Lemuelu Falima, 2005
- Adopted: 2012

Audio sample
- file; help

"Te Atua o Tokelau" ("The God of Tokelau"), or "Tokelau mo te Atua" ("Tokelau for God"), is the national anthem of Tokelau (Viki o Tokelau), a territory within the Realm of New Zealand. Adopted in 2012, it was written and composed by Eric Lemuelu Falima. The official national anthem is "God Save the King".

== History ==
In 2005, the Tokelau legislature announced a contest for an anthem for the islands. After a four-year selection process, an entry by Eric Lemuelu Falima was chosen as the winner. The lyrics were subsequently debated and revised until March 2012, when the anthem was adopted.

== Lyrics ==
Tokelauan original

Te Atua o Tokelau
Te Atua o nuku, te Atua o Tokelau

Fakamanuia mai ia Tokelau
Puipui tauhi mai ko ito filemu

Toku fenua, tau aganuku
Tau fuka ke agiagia
Lototahi, tumau hi to fakavae
Tokelau mo te atua
Te Atua o Tokelau

Tokelau

(Spoken:) Hoa, he hoa lava

IPA transcription (Note: See Help:IPA and Tokelauan language § Orthography and alphabet.)

[te a.tu.a o to.ke.la.u]
[te a.tu.a o nu.ku te a.tu.a o to.ke.la.u]

[fa.ka.ma.nu.i.a ma.i i.a to.ke.la.u]
[pu.i.pu.i ta.u.hi mai̯ ko i.to fi.le.mu]

[to.ku fe.nu.a tau̯ a.ŋa.nu.ku]
[ta.u fu.ka ke a.ŋi.a.ŋi.a]
[lo.to.ta.hi tu.ma.u hi to fa.ka.va.e]
[to.ke.la.u mo te a.tu.a]
[te a.tu.a o to.ke.la.u]

[to.ke.la.u]

[ho.a he ho.a la.va]

English translation

The god of Tokelau
The god of villages, the god of Tokelau

Do bless Tokelau
Carefully tend the peaceful ito

My land, your custom
Your flag that’s waving
Of one mind, stand firm as a foundation
Tokelau for the god
The god of Tokelau

Tokelau
