= Friedrich Kuhlau =

Danish composer

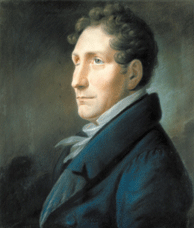
Friedrich Kuhlau, pastel by Christian Horneman from 1828

Friedrich Daniel Rudolf Kuhlau, sometimes written as Frederick Kulav, (11 September 1786 – 12 March 1832) was a Danish pianist and composer during the late Classical and early Romantic periods. He was a central figure of the Danish Golden Age and is immortalized in Danish cultural history through his music for Elves' Hill, the first true work of Danish National Romanticism and a concealed tribute to the absolute monarchy.

During his lifetime, Kuhlau was known primarily as a concert pianist and composer of Danish opera, but was responsible for introducing many of Beethoven's works, which he greatly admired, to Copenhagen audiences. Kuhlau was a prolific composer, as evidenced by the fact that although his house burned down, destroying all of his unpublished manuscripts, he still left a legacy of more than 200 published works in most genres.

== Early life and education ==
Kuhlau was born on 11 September 1786 just south of Lüneburg in the Uelzen district of Lower Saxony (Germany). At the age of seven, he lost his right eye when he slipped on ice and fell. His father, grandfather, and uncle were military oboists. Even though Kuhlau was born to a poor family, his parents managed to pay for piano lessons. In 1802 he moved to Hamburg where he began learning the piano with scholar C.F.G Schwencke.

== Career ==
In 1804, Kuhlau made his debut and began working as a concert pianist. It was around this time that he began composing songs and chamber music to earn money. Many of Kuhlau's compositions throughout his life were for the flute, though he himself did not play the instrument. In 1810, he fled to Copenhagen to avoid conscription in the Napoleonic Army, which overwhelmed the many small principalities and duchies of northern Germany. In the same year, Kuhlau published his first piano and flute compositions. Kuhlau made a living in Copenhagen as a piano teacher and composer in 1811. He was later appointed as a non-salaried musician in the Danish Court in 1812. Kuhlau eventually became a Danish subject in 1813. Following the success of his singspiel, The Robber's Castle, Kuhlau achieved a high-paying position as a singing teacher at the Royal Theater in 1816. Kuhlau's works between 1817 and 1820 failed to gain much prominence. His opera, The Magic Harp, was said to have failed due to a controversial libretto. In 1821 and 1825, Kuhlau travelled to Vienna where he befriended Ludwig van Beethoven. Beethoven's influence is evidential in Kuhlau's later works such as his singspiel, Elverhøj or Elves' Hill, a work widely regarded as a tribute to the Danish Monarchy and an inspiring piece from the Danish Golden Age. In 1828, Kuhlau was awarded an honorary professorship.

== Music ==
=== Operatic works ===
Kuhlau had his breakthrough in 1814 at the Royal Danish Theatre with Røverborgen ("The Robbers' Castle"), a singspiel with a libretto by Adam Oehlenschläger.

His next dramatic works, including Trylleharpen (1817), Elisa (1820) and Hugo og Adelheid (1827), lacking drama, failed miserably. With Lulu from 1824 he finally once again experienced success with one of his singspiels. He also wrote music for performances of William Shakespeare's plays.

In 1828 he achieved his greatest success when he wrote the music for Elverhøj. It won immediate popularity, especially for its overture and the final royal anthem, his setting of Kong Christian stod ved høien Mast (King Christian Stood by the Towering Mast). In the music, Kuhlau made very effective use of Danish and Swedish folk tunes. In 1976 the overture was rearranged by Danish composer Bent Fabricius-Bjerre and used as the soundtrack in a scene in the film The Olsen Gang Sees Red. The scene depicts the Olsen Gang breaking into The Royal Theater of Copenhagen, making their way through bricked up walls using explosives and other means. The whole break-in is choreographed so it corresponds directly to the music. The scene is one of the most – if not the most – recognized in the history of Danish film.

=== Other works ===
Alongside his dramatic works, Kuhlau wrote several compositions for flute and a large number of works for piano. Particularly his short pieces, sonatinas, for piano, enjoyed great popularity both in Denmark and abroad.

Beethoven, whom Kuhlau knew personally, exerted the greatest influence upon his music. Kuhlau's C major Piano Concerto, Op. 7 from 1810 displays a strong influence from Beethoven's Piano Concerto No. 1 in C major, written 14 years earlier. All three movements of the work are strongly reminiscent of the corresponding movements in Beethoven's work, making it a musical pastiche.

In addition to the above-mentioned piano concerto were a string quartet and several works for piano that included all the current genres of the day: sonatas, sonatinas, waltzes, rondos and variations. He also created several works for strings with piano (three quartets and two quintets, and several violin sonatas), works of incidental music and several operas. However, his most-often recorded and played works are several piano sonatinas and numerous works for flute. It is because of these flute works that he was nicknamed "the Beethoven of the flute" during his lifetime.
