= Der er et yndigt land =

National anthem of Denmark

English: 'There Is a Lovely Land'
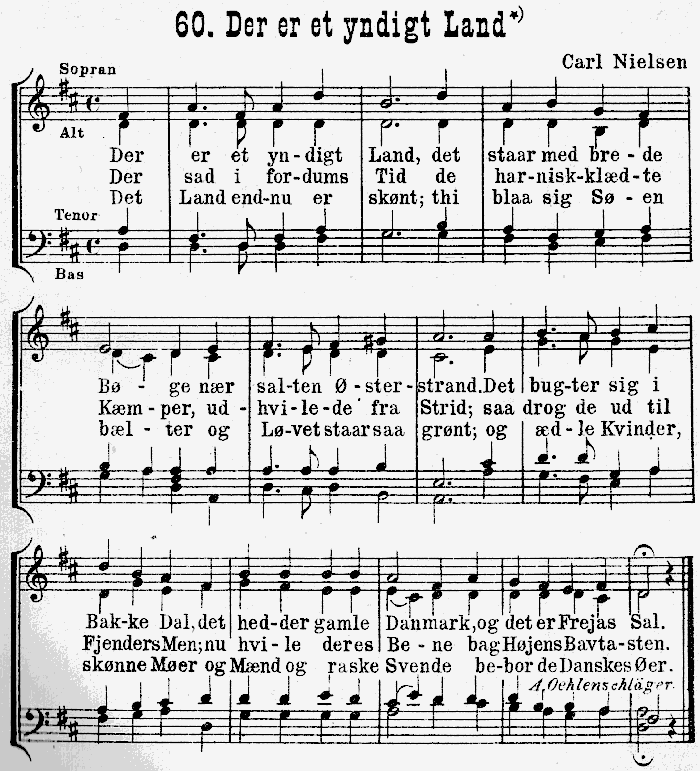
- Sheet music
- Co-national anthem of Denmark
- Lyrics: Adam Oehlenschläger, 1819
- Music: Hans Ernst Krøyer, 1835
- Adopted: 1835

Audio sample
- U.S. Navy Band instrumental version in F major: file; help

"Der er et yndigt land" (Danish: [tɛɐ̯ ˈɛɐ̯ e̝t ˈøntit ˈlænˀ]; lit. 'There Is a Lovely Land') is one of the two national anthems of Denmark—the other being the royal anthem "Kong Christian stod ved højen mast".

== History ==
The lyrics were written in 1819 by Adam Oehlenschläger and bore the motto in Latin: Ille terrarum mihi praeter omnes angulus ridet (Horace: "This corner of the earth smiles for me more than any other"). The music was composed in 1835 by Hans Ernst Krøyer. Later, Thomas Laub and Carl Nielsen, each composed alternative melodies, but neither has gained widespread adoption, and today they are mostly unknown to the general population.

When it was first published, the national anthem had twelve verses, but later editions shortened it to the first, third, fifth, and last verses.

Denmark is one of only two countries in the world — the other being New Zealand – with two official national anthems. Officially, "Kong Christian stod ved højen mast" is a national and a royal anthem; it has equal status with "Der er et yndigt land", the civil national anthem. On official and military occasions, "Kong Christian" is performed alone, or the two national anthems are played together.

== Lyrics ==
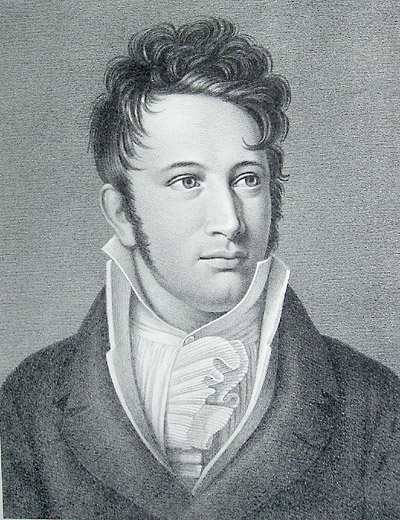
Adam Oehlenschläger, the author of the lyrics

In certain situations, such as sporting events, only the first verse (or stanza) and the last three lines of the fourth verse are sung.

Danish original

Der er et yndigt land,
Det står med brede bøge
𝄆 Nær salten østerstrand. 𝄇
Det bugter sig i bakke, dal,
Det hedder gamle Danmark
𝄆 Og det er Frejas sal. 𝄇

Der sad i fordums tid
De harniskklædte kæmper,
𝄆 Udhvilede fra strid. 𝄇
Så drog de frem til fjenders mén,
Nu hvile deres bene
𝄆 Bag højens bautasten. 𝄇

Det land endnu er skønt,
Thi blå sig søen bælter,
𝄆 Og løvet står så grønt. 𝄇
Og ædle kvinder, skønne møer
Og mænd og raske svende
𝄆 Bebo de danskes øer. 𝄇

Hil drot og fædreland!
Hil hver en danneborger,
𝄆 Som virker, hvad han kan! 𝄇
Vort gamle Danmark skal bestå,
Så længe bøgen spejler
𝄆 Sin top i bølgen blå. 𝄇

IPA transcription (Note: See Help:IPA/Danish and Danish phonology.)

[tɛɐ̯ ɛɐ̯ e̝t ˈøn.tit lænˀ |]
[te̝ ˈstɒˀ með ˈpʁeː.ðə ˈpøː.jə ‖]
𝄆 [nɛɐ̯ˀ ˈsæl.tən ˈøs.tɐ.ˌstʁɑnˀ |] 𝄇
[te̝ ˈpɔk.tɐ sɑj i ˈpɑ.kə tɛˀl ‖]
[te̝ ˈhe̝.ðˀɐ ˈkɑm.lə ˈtæn.mɑk |]
𝄆 [ʌ te̝ ɛɐ̯ ˈfʁɑ.jæs sɛˀl ‖] 𝄇

[tɛɐ̯ sæðˀ i ˈfɒː.tɔms tsʰiðˀ |]
[ti ˈhɑː.nisk.ˌkʰleˀ.tə ˈkʰem.pɐ ‖]
𝄆 [ˈuð.ˌviˀ.lə.ðə fʁɑ stʁiðˀ |] 𝄇
[sʌ tʁoˀ ti fʁæmˀ tsʰe̝l ˈfje.nɐs me̝ˀn ‖]
[nu ˈviː.lə ˈtɛɐ̯.ɐs ˈpe̝ː.nə |]
𝄆 [pɛˀj ˈhʌ.jəns ˈpɑw.tæ.ˌste̝ˀn ‖] 𝄇

[te̝ lænˀ e.ˈnu ɛɐ̯ skœnˀt |]
[tsʰi plɔˀ sɑj søˀ.jən ˈpel.tɐ ‖]
𝄆 [ʌ(w) ˈløˀ.vəð stɒˀ sʌ kʁɶnˀt |] 𝄇
[ʌ(w) ˈɛˀð.lə ˈkve̝.nɐ skœ.nə møˀɐ ‖]
[ʌ(w) menˀ ʌ(w) ˈʁɑs.kə ˈsve.nə |]
𝄆 [pe̝.ˈpoˀ ti ˈtæns.kəs øˀɐ ‖] 𝄇

[hilˀ tʁʌt ʌ(w) ˈfeð.ʁɐ.ˌlænˀ |]
[hilˀ vɛɐ̯ˀ e̝n ˈtæ.nə.ˌpɒː.wɐ ‖]
𝄆 [sʌm ˈviɐ̯.kɐ væð hæn kʰænˀ |] 𝄇
[vɒːt ˈkɑm.lə ˈtæn.mɑk ˈskæl pe̝.ˈstɔˀ ‖]
[sʌ ˈle.ŋə ˈpøː.jən ˈspɑj.lɐ |]
𝄆 [sin tsʰʌp i ˈpøl.jən plɔˀ ‖] 𝄇

English Translation

There is a land we love
with shady beech-trees aspread
𝄆 The briny shores above. 𝄇
Its hills and valleys gently fall,
'Tis the name of ol' Denmark,
𝄆 'Tis good ol' Freya's hall. 𝄇

There in the days of yore
Sat armoured giants rested
𝄆 'Tween their frays of gore 𝄇
Then they went forth the foe to face,
Now found in stone-set barrows,
𝄆 Their final resting place. 𝄇

This land is still as fair,
The sea is blue around it,
𝄆 And peace is cherished there. 𝄇
Strong men and noble women still
Uphold their country's honour
𝄆 With faithfulness and skill. 𝄇

Hail king and fatherland!
Hail citizens of honour,
𝄆 Who do the best they can. 𝄇
Our ancient Denmark shall remain,
As long as beech tops mirror
𝄆 In waves of blue their chain! 𝄇
