= List of Greenlanders =

The following is a list of notable people from Greenland:

- Naja Abelsen (born 1964), artist, book illustrator
- Arnarsaq (c. 1716 – fl. 1778), translator, interpreter, and missionary
- Arnarulunnguaq (1896–1933), native Greenlandic woman who accompanied Knud Rasmussen on his Fifth Thule Expedition
- Aron of Kangeq (1822–1869), hunter, painter, and oral historian
- Julie Berthelsen (born 1979), singer-songwriter
- Rasmus Berthelsen (1827–1901), teacher, poet and artist
- Jørgen Brønlund (1877–1907), explorer, educator, and catechist
- Bibi Chemnitz (born 1983), fashion designer
- Kathrine Chemnitz (1894–1978), politician and champion of Greenlandic women's education
- Nukaaka Coster-Waldau (born 1971), singer, actress, and Miss Greenland, 1990
- Aviâja Egede Lynge (born 1974), indigenous rights activist, childhood rights commissioner
- Jesper Grønkjær (born 1977), professional footballer
- Ole Jørgen Hammeken (born 1956), explorer and actor
- Hans Hendrik (1832–1889), Arctic traveller and interpreter
- Arnannguaq Høegh (1956–2020), graphic artist and educator
- Ricky Enø Jørgensen (born 1989), racing cyclist
- Jessie Kleemann (born 1959), poet, performance artist
- Makka Kleist (born 1951), actress
- Nina Kreutzmann Jørgensen (born 1977), singer
- Angunnguaq Larsen, actor (Borgen)
- Thorkell Leifsson (11th cent.), son of Leif Erikson, paramount chieftain of Greenland
- Rasmus Lerdorf (born 1968), creator of the PHP programming language
- Henrik Lund (1875–1948), lyricist, painter and priest
- Nauja Lynge (born 1965), writer, lecturer
- Anders Olsen (1718–1786), trader and colonial administrator
- Maligiaq Padilla (born 1982), famous kayaker
- Johan Carl Christian Petersen (1813–1880), seaman and interpreter
- Gertrud Rask (1673–1735), wife of missionary Hans Egede and mother of Paul
- Knud Rasmussen (1879–1933), polar explorer and anthropologist
- Signe Rink (1836–1909), writer and ethnologist
- Lars Rosing (born 1972), actor, brother of film director Otto
- Otto Rosing (born 1967), film director, brother of actor Lars
- Minik Wallace (c.1890–1918), Inughuaq child brought to New York in 1897 by Robert Peary
- Karla Jessen Williamson (born 1954), executive director of the Arctic Institute of North America
- Qupanuk Olsen (born 1985), Greenlandic YouTuber, content creator, and engineer

== Politicians ==
- Maliina Abelsen (born 1976), politician and MP for Inuit Ataqatigiit
- Hermann Berthelsen (born 1956), politician of the Siumut (Forward) party; mayor of Sisimiut
- Palle Christiansen (born 1973), Democrats politician, Minister for Finance, and Member of the Greenland Government
- Agnethe Davidsen (1947–2007), first female government minister
- Hans Enoksen (born 1956), politician, fourth prime minister
- Agathe Fontain (born 1951), politician, Minister for Health
- Anthon Frederiksen, leader of the Democrats, Minister for Housing, Infrastructure and Transport, and Deputy-Premier
- Ane Hansen (born 1961), politician, Minister for Fisheries, Hunting and Agriculture
- Aki-Matilda Høegh-Dam (born 1996), politician, member of the Folketing, Siumut party
- Doris J. Jensen (born 1978), politician, member of the Siumut party
- Lars-Emil Johansen (born 1946), second prime minister
- Mimi Karlsen (born 1957), politician, Minister for Culture, Education, Research and Church Affairs
- Kuupik Kleist (born 1958), politician
- Aqqaluk Lynge (born 1947), former president of the Inuit Circumpolar Council
- Jonathan Motzfeldt (1938–2010), first prime minister
- Josef Motzfeldt (born 1941), politician, Minister for Finance and Foreign Affairs
- Asii Chemnitz Narup (born 1954), politician and MP for Inuit Ataqatigiit
- Lena Pedersen (born 1940), Canadian politician and social worker
- Kristine Raahauge (1949–2022), municipal politician, activist, eskimologist and writer
- Henriette Rasmussen (1950–2017), educator, journalist, women's rights activist and politician
- Augusta Salling (born 1954), politician, former finance minister
