= List of Greenlandic films =

A list of films produced in the Greenlandic language either by Greenlandic or Danish producers, sorted in alphabetical order.

Title	Director	Release Date	Genre	Ref
Among Us – In the Land of Our Shadows (Akornatsinniittut – Tarratta Nunaanni)	Marc Fussing Rosbach	2017	Science fiction	
Among Us – The Masked Man (Akornatsinniittut - Kiinappalik)	Marc Fussing Rosbach	2021	Science fiction	
Anori	Pipaluk K. Jørgensen	2018	Drama	
Aqqalu	Kristian Nygaard	2011	Drama	
Behind the Door (Matup Tunuani)	Rune Bundgaard, Martin Svinkløv	2015	Documentary	
Black Hole Legion	Jonathan Omer Mizrahi, Ariel Sereni Brown	2022	Short documentary	
Call of the Ice	Mike Magidson, Xavier Liberman	2016	Documentary	
The Edge of the Shadow (Alanngut Killinganni)	Malik Kleist	2022	Horror	
The Experiment (Eksperimentet)	Louise Friedberg	2010	Drama	
Eskimo Weekend	Inuk Silis Høegh	2002	Short drama	
The Fight for Greenland	Kenneth Sorento	2020	Documentary	
Goodnight (Sinilluarit)	Inuk Silis Høegh	1999	Short comedy	
Heart of Light (Qaamarngup uummataa)	Jacob Grønlykke	1998	Drama	
Hinnarik Sinnattunilu	Angayo Lennert-Sandgreen	2009	Comedy	
Imajuik	Marc Fussing Rosbach	2021	Science fiction short	
In Shadows in the Mountains (Qaqqat Alanngui)	Malik Kleist	2011	Horror	
Inuk	Mike Magidson	2010	Drama	
Ivalu	Anders Walter, Pipaluk K. Jørgensen	2023	Short drama	
Kaali Goes for Seal Hunting (Uuttoq – Kaali på sælfangst)	Tørk Haxthausen	1985	Short documentary	
Kalak	Isabella Eklöf	2023	Drama	
Narsaq – ung by i Grønland	Claus Hermansen	1979	Documentary	
Nâlagkersuissut okarput tássagôk	Per Kirkeby, Arkaluk Lynge	1973	Documentary	
The Last Human (Siunissaq – det sidste menneske)	Ivalo Frank	2022	Documentary	
The Last Walk: Greenland	Pipaluk K. Jørgensen, Mikisoq Hove Lynge	2016	Short drama	
Nuummioq	Otto Rosing, Torben Bech	2009	Drama	
Qivitoq	Erik Balling	1956	Drama	
Snow	Nivi Pedersen	2017	Short documentary	
Sumé: The Sound of a Revolution	Inuk Silis Høegh	2014	Documentary	
Translations (Nutsigassat)	Tinne Senner	2018	Short documentary	
Twice Colonized	Lin Alluna	2023	Documentary	
Ukiutoqqami Pilluaritsi	Otto Rosing	2019	Comedy	
Utuqaq	Iva Radivojevic	2020	Short documentary	
Walls - Akinni Inuk	Sofie Rørdam, Nina Paninnguaq Skydsbjerg	2025	Documentary	
The Wedding of Palo (Palos brudefærd)	Friedrich Dalsheim	1934	Drama	
When the Darkness Comes (Unnuap Taarnerpaaffiani)	Malik Kleist	2014	Horror	

== See also ==
- List of Greenlandic submissions for the Academy Award for Best Foreign Language Film
- Category:Films shot in Greenland
