= Reindeer hunting in Greenland =

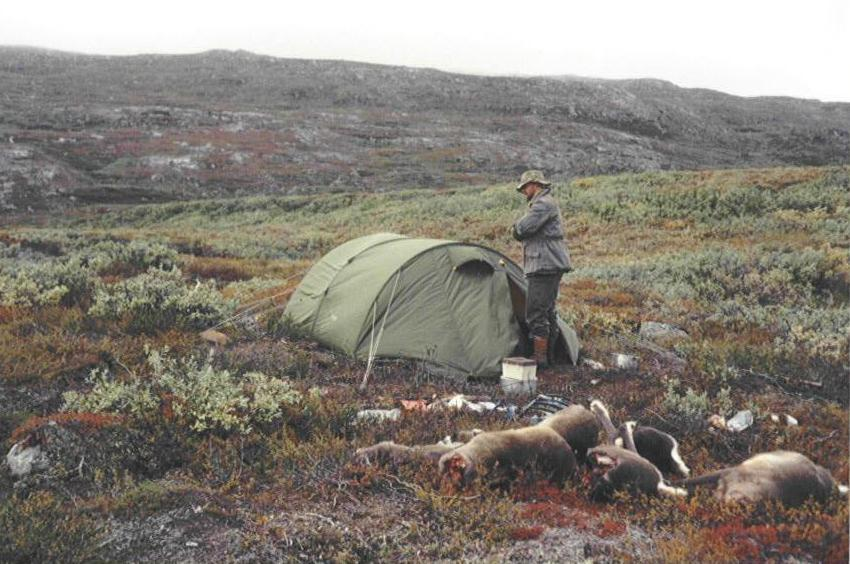
A hunting campsite in Nuup Kangerlua fjord

Reindeer hunting in Greenland is of great importance to the Greenlandic Inuit and sports hunters, both residents and tourists. Reindeer (caribou) are an important source of meat, and harvesting them has always played an important role in the history, culture, and traditions of the Greenlandic Inuit. Controlled hunting is important for the welfare of reindeer, the quality of life for Inuit, both as food, and part of their culture and Greenlandic culture in general, and the preservation of tundra grazing areas. Therefore, scientific research is regularly performed to determine the quotas needed to maintain a proper ecological balance.

== Background ==
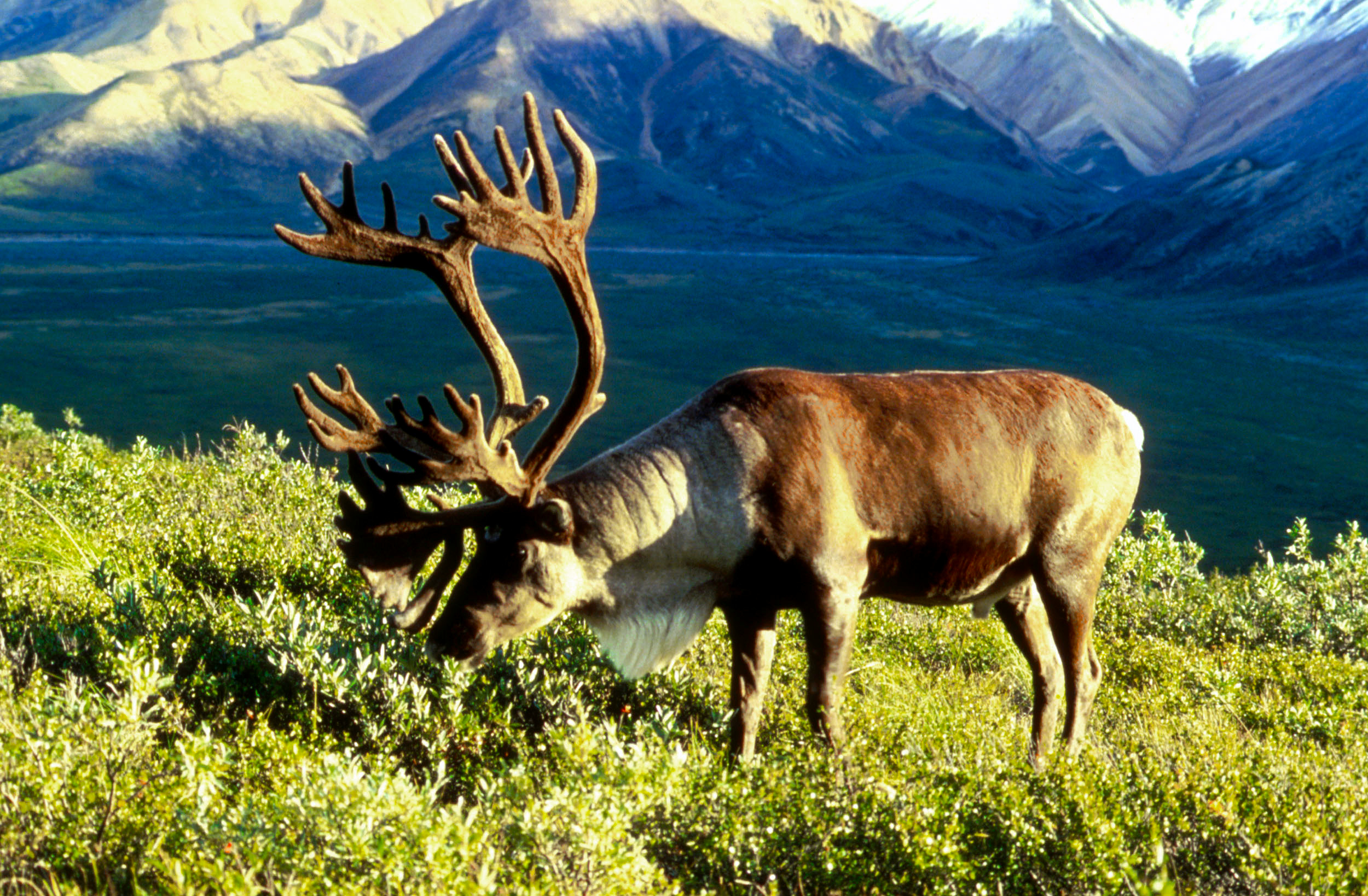
A large bull reindeer

Reindeer hunting by humans has a long history. Caribou/wild reindeer "may well be the species of single greatest importance in the entire anthropological literature on hunting."

In Greenland, wild reindeer have been hunted as a source of food, clothing, shelter, and tools by the Inuit - the indigenous peoples that populate the Arctic and colder regions. Methods that they have employed include crossbow, bow and arrow, snares, driving, trapping pits, driving them off cliffs or into lakes and then spearing them from kayaks, and now using modern firearms. The entire reindeer, including fur, skin, antlers, and bones have been used. Their meat, viscera, internal organs, and even stomach contents, have all been utilized as food, both raw, dried, smoked, and cooked. Today reindeer are primarily hunted by residents and tourists for their meat, but mature animals may also be the objects of trophy hunting because of the often large size of their antlers. They have the largest antlers relative to body size among deer.

In Greenland, more reindeer are harvested than any other big game land mammal species. Reindeer meat is an important staple in most households.

Game harvesting conditions in Greenland can be extreme, and the unpredictable forces of nature can be hazardous to hunters. Greenland is large and long with differing hunting customs and regulations, as well as weather patterns, depending on the region and season. The Greenland wilderness is sensitive and hunters are expected to respect it and "leave nothing but footprints."

== Inuit identity: hunting and reindeer ==
=== Cultural status of the hunting experience ===
Hunting has always been an extremely important aspect of the Greenland Inuit culture:

"The Inuit culture is the most pure hunting culture in existence. Having adapted to the extreme living conditions in the High Arctic of the North American continent for at least four thousand years, Inuit are not even hunter-gatherers. Inuit are hunters, pure and simple." (Henriette Rasmussen, Minister in Greenland Home Rule Government)

Even today hunting's importance is confirmed by the Greenland Home Rule Government:

"Hunting is the heart and soul of Greenlandic culture.... Hunting is also very important from a cultural perspective. In a society such as Greenland, which for centuries was based on subsistence hunting (until about fifty years ago), hunting is still of great cultural importance. Irrespective of the fact that most live like wage-earners in a modern industrial society, many Greenlanders identity is still deeply rooted in the hunting."

Reindeer hunting has a special status in the populace. Shooting a muskox provides four times as much meat as a reindeer, but "Greenlanders would much rather have caribou or reindeer meat than musk ox meat," says Josefine Nymand.

"... the experience is just as important [as the meat]. It is simply the most wonderful part of the year. The trips in for the caribou hunt in the beautiful autumn weather have a great social and physical meaning for people's wellbeing. It has many functions." (Peter Nielsen, Head of Office at the Ministry of Environment and Nature)

=== Inuit welfare and hunting culture ===
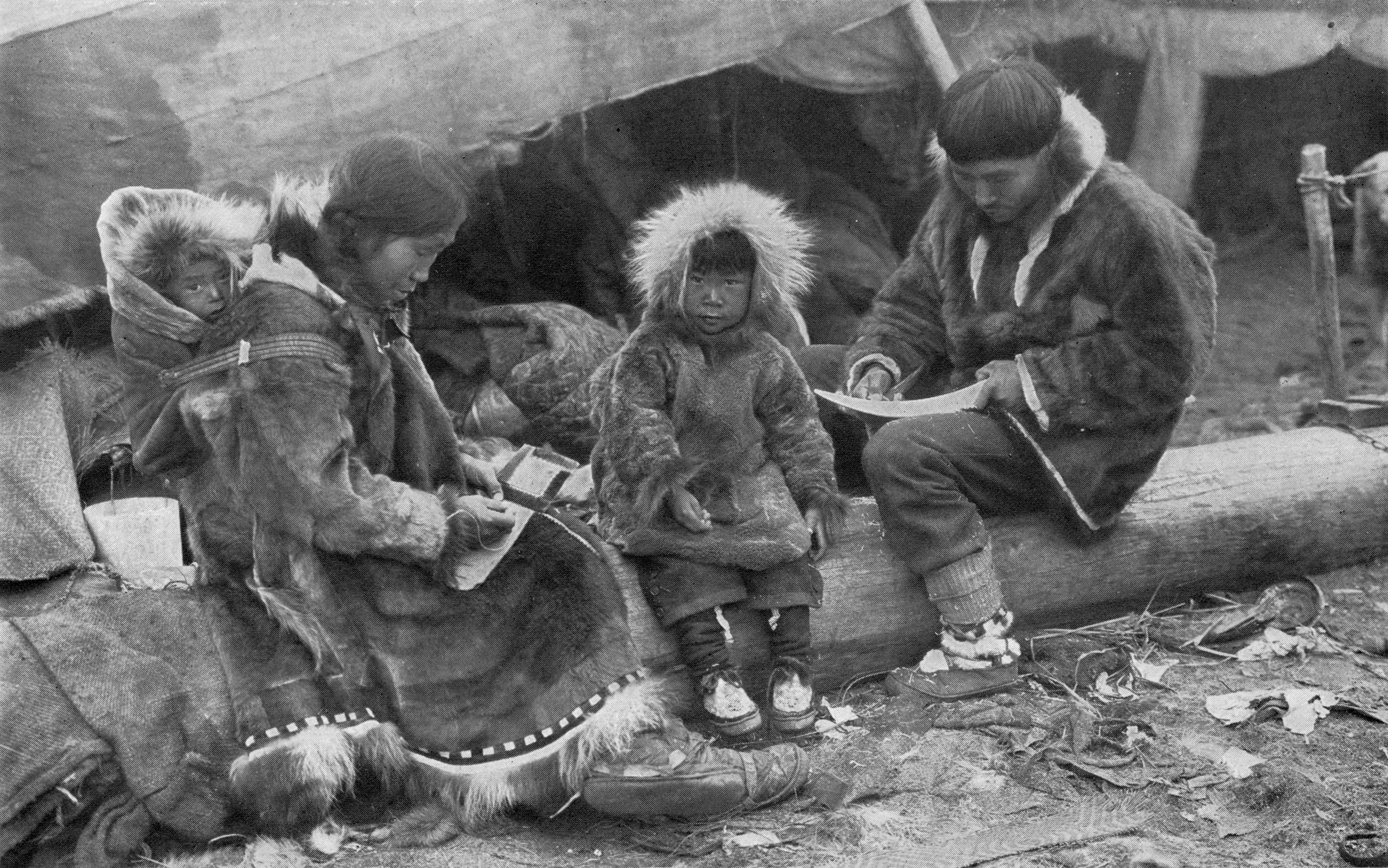
An Inuit family (1917)

The long history of mutual dependence between humans and reindeer necessitates continuing efforts to safeguard their relationship and the welfare of both parties. Reindeer hunting – which is also commonplace in many other parts of the world – is considered so vital to the cultural heritage of certain groups that there is an attempt being made to get it placed on UNESCO's World Heritage List.

The identity of the Inuit is closely tied to the geography, history and the attitudes toward hunting – "For Inuit, ecology, hunting and culture are synonymous." – and their identity as hunters is under attack. Those attacks are "... viewed in the Arctic as a direct assault on culture, identity as well as sustainable use," and Inuit are reacting:

"... for the Inuit, animal rights campaigns are just the latest in a long litany of religious, industry, and government policies imposed by outsiders – policies which ignore Inuit values and realities, and threaten the survival of one of the world's last remaining aboriginal hunting cultures."

Therefore, the circumpolar peoples and their organizations are actively engaged in attempts to protect their welfare, identity, interests, and culture, including their hunting culture. The "Kuujjuaq Declaration" addressed perceived attacks on their autonomy and rights, and recommended that the Inuit Circumpolar Conference (now the Inuit Circumpolar Council) "undertake a comprehensive study on how best to address global forces, such as the 'animal rights' and other destructive movements that aim to destroy Inuit sustainable use of living resources, and to report back to the next General Assembly on its findings." The International Arctic Science Committee shares these viewpoints and therefore one of its objectives is to study the "sustainable use of living resources of high value to Arctic residents."

=== Reindeer welfare, sustainability, and quotas ===
Biologists and other research scientists constantly monitor the welfare, living conditions, and health of reindeer, as well as the ecological health of their habitat, and they make recommendations and set quotas designed to ensure that game resources and natural biodiversity are protected, managed, and maintained. Many factors, some of them difficult to measure or predict, are analyzed including natural cycles, parasites, disease, short-term weather conditions (relative harshness of winter or summer), long-term climate changes, and condition of food sources. Hunting is not the only factor affecting reindeer welfare, but it is one area that can be managed to some degree.

Since reindeer in southwestern Greenland have no naturally occurring non-human predators, harvesting quotas are established to help regulate the number of reindeer in an area and prevent overgrazing and death from starvation. During the winter, the great effort of pawing down (known as "cratering") through the snow to their favorite food, a lichen known as reindeer moss, can cost them too many calories in expended energy, causing them to lose strength and die. Without human monitoring and regulation, mass starvation of reindeer would be a recurring problem.

Harvesting recommendations are also based on other prognostic factors, among them estimates of reindeer population density, total population in various regions, and availability of adequate food sources. Since these estimates are difficult to make and can vary over time for each region, the recommendations and quotas are constantly adapted to the local needs, sometimes quite radically. Historically, Greenland's reindeer population has fluctuated widely. For example, it numbered around 100,000 in the early 1970s and then was believed to have dropped to about 9,000 in 1993. Hunting regulations reflected these mistaken and hotly debated estimates and harvesting was suspended from the summer of 1993 until the autumn of 1995, whereupon hunting was once again allowed.

The controversial suspension of hunting in 1993-1995 "created much public anger." Hunters' local knowledge contradicted the official estimates and a survey in 2000-2001 confirmed the hunters' claims that there were far more animals to be harvested. Quotas were then radically increased and the hunting season was lengthened: "In an effort to reduce caribou number and density, open harvests were continued in 2003, 2004 and 2005."

In 2005, improved counting methods revealed that the previous estimates had indeed been misleading and that the population density was far too high, with 3-4 caribou per km^{2}, rather than the preferred 1.2 per km^{2}. In 2006 the number of reindeer was estimated to be more than 100,000, which was still too many animals. A constant concern is that overpopulation can lead to increased mortality of calves, damage to feeding grounds, and a population crash:

"Independent of climate and genetics, caribou calf mortality increases with high population density and grazing pressure.... [O]ver-abundance of caribou on the range may be a current problem, which may soon become an acute problem. Unfortunately, it is unknown how much longer the present range can continue to support the current caribou numbers. If the herds are allowed to continue status quo or increase further there is a clear risk of lasting damage to ranges. If the ranges are destroyed, caribou stocks can be expected to crash.

Scientists and hunters continue to work together for the benefit of all concerned parties: reindeer, hunters, and the general populace of Greenland. Since Greenland's tundra is more sensitive than elsewhere in the Arctic due to the ever-present inland ice sheet, measures have been taken to protect the very sensitive and vulnerable range grounds. The ice sheet acts like an open refrigerator door, stunting the growth of vegetation along the coastal regions and making recovery a slow process.

== Reindeer ==
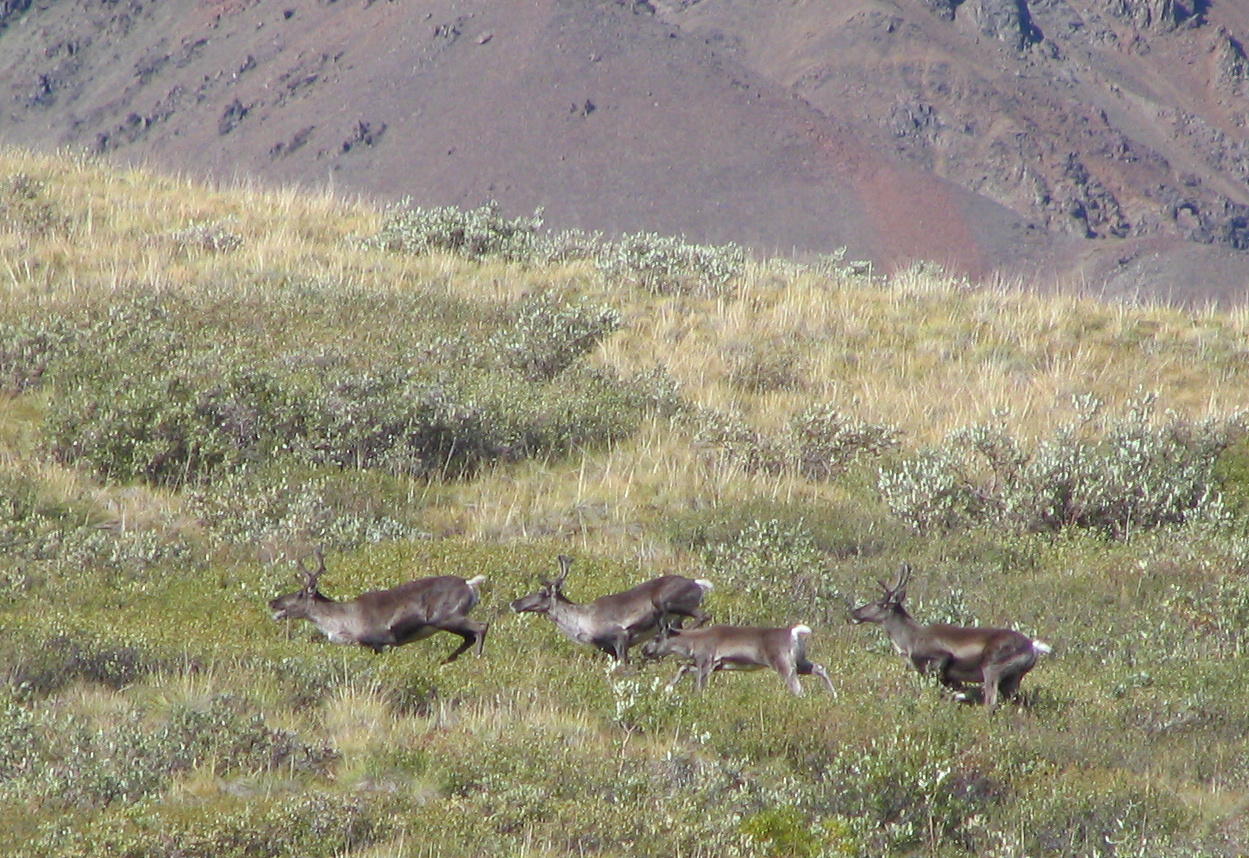
Running reindeer

Reindeer (or caribou) (also called tuttu by the Greenlandic Inuit and rensdyr or rener by Danes) are the only deer species in which both sexes have antlers. Greenland animals can vary considerably in size, with females weighing up to 90 kg (198 lb) and the males ("bulls") 150 kg (331 lb). Other species of reindeer can be larger or smaller. In Greenland both sexes may be hunted. Although they have antlers, they rarely use them against humans, even when backed into a corner by the Sami people who herd, milk, and slaughter them for food in other lands. Their usual defense against humans is to pull away or flee, often uphill. Males use their antlers when sparring against each other, and reindeer may use them as a last resort to defend themselves and their young against predators such as wolves, although wolves present no threat in southwestern Greenland. Although rarely aggressive toward humans, when in rut bulls will defend their harems from other bulls, and when humans come between a bull and his harem, attacks have been recorded.

Tame reindeer are known to be curious, but even wild reindeer can be curious in some situations. The wild reindeer is a shy animal and it reacts very quickly to sudden sounds or movements as well as the smell of strangers. In spite of this, inexperienced animals may even approach quite closely to a hunter and curiously observe while the hunter is field dressing a downed animal. They have good hearing and a good sense of smell, but have poor eyesight. They may react to a hunter's movements, but not necessarily to his form if he doesn't move. Under the right conditions, a stealthy hunter may be able to approach surprisingly close to a reindeer, even when the hunter is in full sight of the animal. Many animals are shot at relatively close range (10–50 meters).

=== Three subspecies in Greenland ===
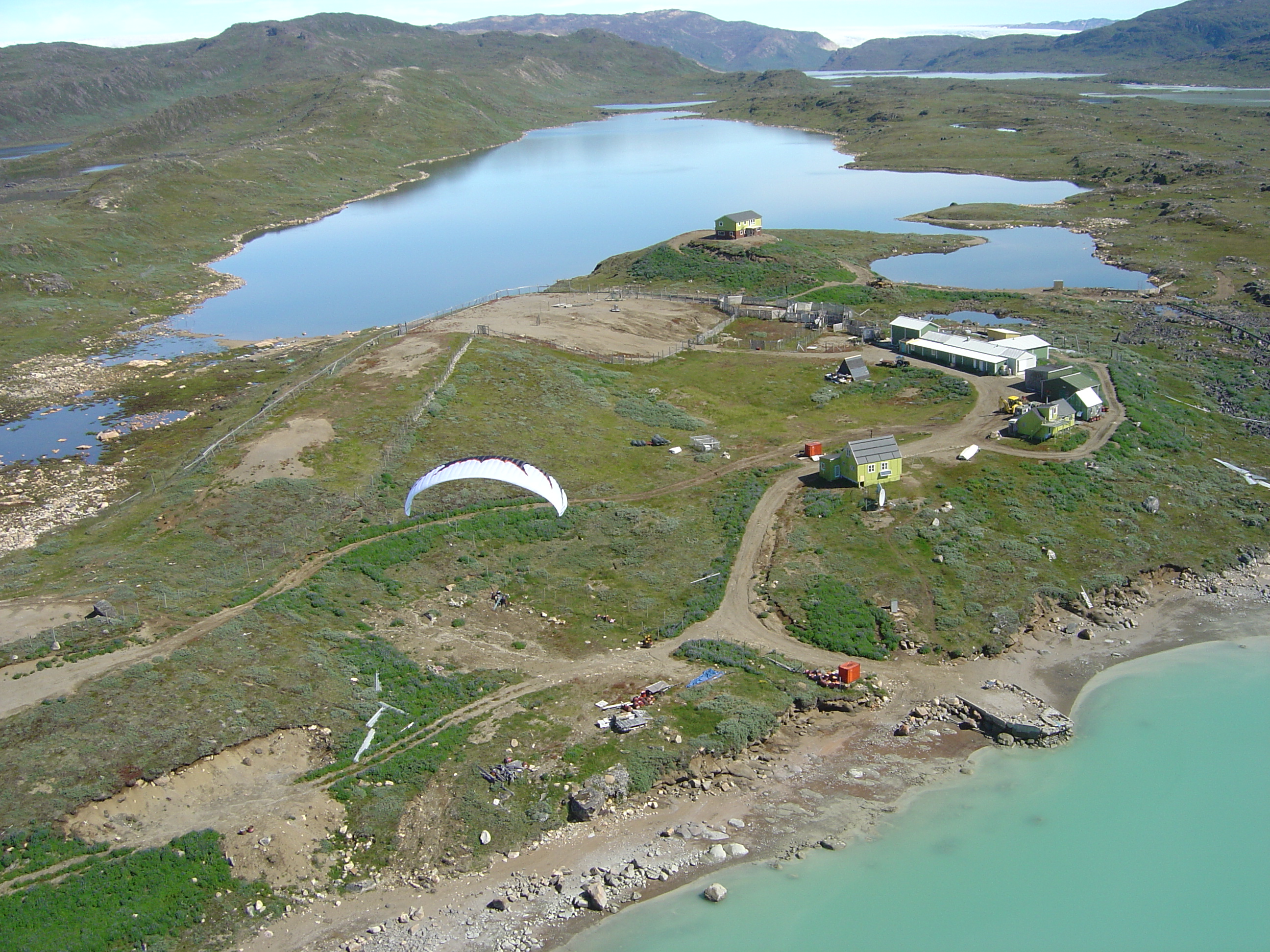
Isortoq Reindeer Station in Summer 2011

Three subspecies of reindeer live in western Greenland where some interbreeding has occurred:

1. The most common variety of reindeer in Greenland is the native wild barren-ground caribou (Rangifer tarandus groenlandicus), which is a medium-sized race of reindeer also found in Canada.
2. The second type are the feral (semi-domestic) mountain reindeer (Rangifer tarandus tarandus), brought from Norway in 1952. They are larger and were first introduced at a game reserve in the Kapisillit region of Godthåb's fjord. Their care was the responsibility of Sami herders who also controlled their harvesting and the meat preparation in a now-abandoned slaughterhouse at Itinnera. "Later animals from Kapisillit were released at several more locations to establish feral populations, which might support a hunting harvest. There is evidence for genetic mixing of native caribou and feral reindeer at some of the locations where reindeer were released." The Isortoq Reindeer Station received Norwegian Reindeer from the Itinnera breeding stock in 1973 and located a 2000 head herd on a 1500 km square concession area. The company had its own abattoir and processing plant (now closed) and annually exported meat to the EU and N. America.
3. A third type of reindeer is the Peary caribou subspecies (Rangifer tarandus pearyi). Reindeer tracks from Ellesmere Island crossing Kane Basin in winter have occasionally been observed from northwestern Greenland, suggesting at least a transient presence in the region. Three live reindeer that most likely strayed from Ellesmere Island across Robeson Channel were observed in Hall Land in 1922, which was the last time live reindeer were observed in northern Greenland. While the taxonomic identity of reindeer in northwestern Greenland has historically been in doubt, genetic testing has confirmed that the reindeer in northwestern Greenland (Inglefield Land) do not share maternal haplotypes or have evidence of genetic exchange with Peary caribou. Instead, the population is primarily made up of barren-ground caribou that originally immigrated from southwestern Greenland. However, studies do not entirely rule out possible mixing with male Peary caribou in the herd.

== Reindeer hunting ==
=== Hunting areas ===
Reindeer hunting in Greenland is permitted and regulated under annual quotas and hunting seasons in eleven different hunting and management regions listed in order: Naternaq, Kangerlussuaq-Sisimiut, Akia-Maniitsoq, Ameralik, Qeqertarsuatsiaat, Qassit, Neria, Nuussuaq Halvø, Olrik Fjord, Inglefield Land & Prudhoe Land, and Ivittuut. Hunting is generally permitted within the boundaries of these regions, but the current exception to this includes the eastern 1/2 of Inglefield Land (protected from hunting reindeer since the 2005/2006 autumn-winter hunting season) and formerly Naternaq, but it seems that hunting in the latter is no longer limited to small sub-areas.

Furthermore, local knowledge suggests that reindeer may be present in three additional areas in Greenland: on Tuttulissuaq along the coast of Melville Bay, in the inland area east-south-east of Upernavik, also known as Svartenhuk, on Disko Island, and in Tasiilaq/Ammassalik (in 1971, 22 semi-domesticated reindeer were released at Sermilik Fjord behind Tasiilaq, became feral, and are now considered extinct). Of the four, only Tuttulissuaq has a verified presence with a group of sixteen reindeer observed during polar bear studies in 2013. Hunting these populations is forbidden due to their populations likely being tiny.

=== Practical details ===
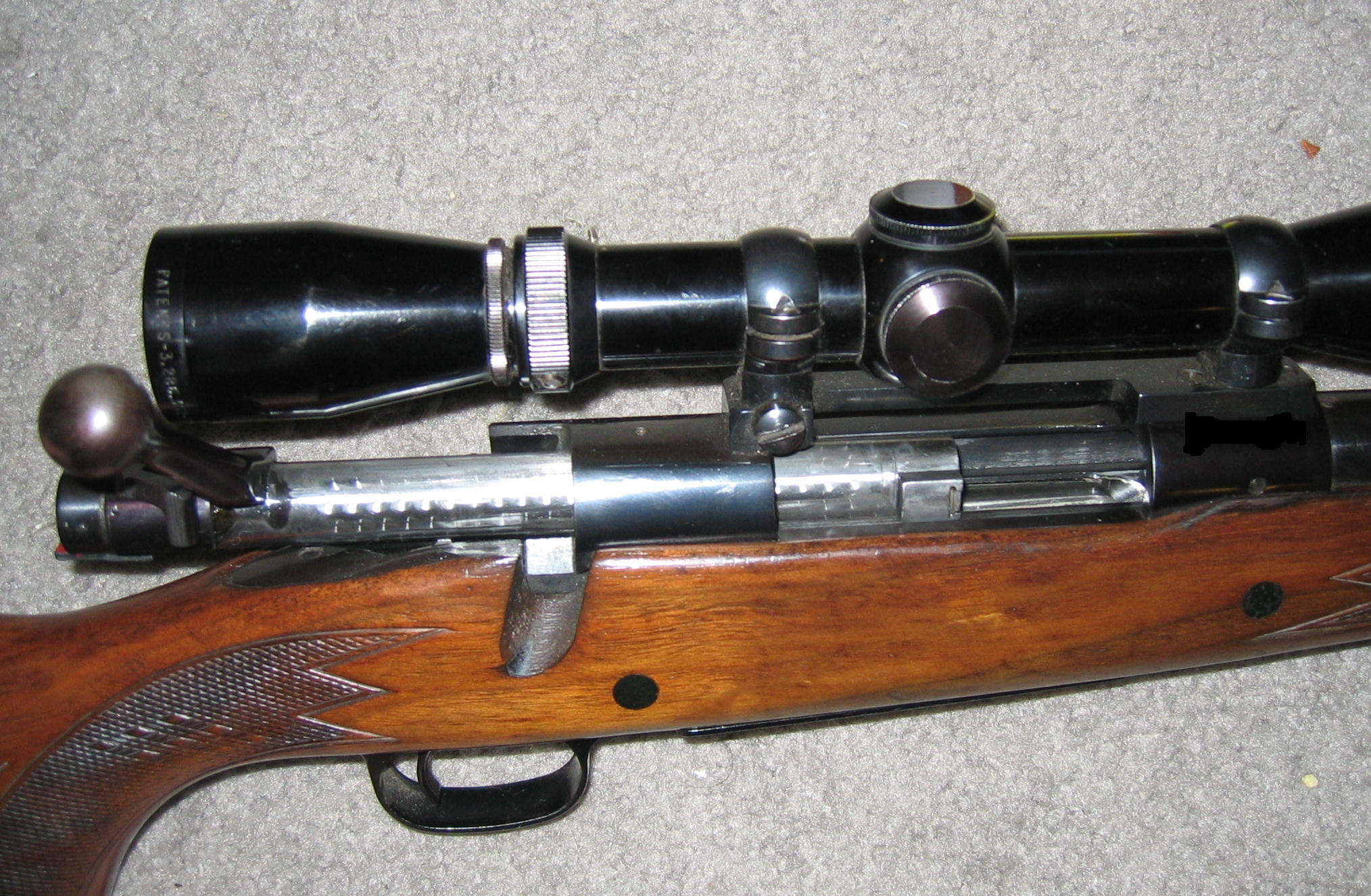
Bolt action rifle with scope

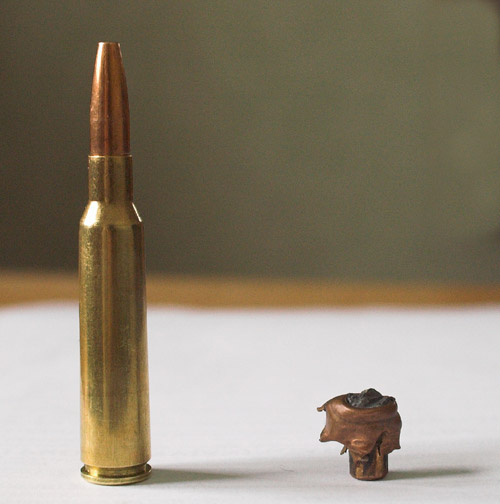
Hollow point bullet

Two main types of hunters are involved in harvesting reindeer: licensed commercial hunters and private resident sporting hunters, with tourists, trophy hunters, and research scientists harvesting a few more animals.

Transportation to and from hunting areas is nearly always done by boat. The rest of the transportation is by foot. If the hunting area is far inland, it may involve carrying equipment to a lake, and then transporting it across the lake to a campsite using a smaller type of boat, such as a rowboat, canoe (including collapsible models), or a rubber inflatable boat. Some lakes have boats permanently left (or hidden in the bushes) near the shores, and they are sometimes used by hunters (not necessarily the owners) who frequent the area.

In 2006 the only hunting weapons allowed for reindeer harvesting were bolt action, non-automatic rifles, using .222 Remington caliber cartridges or larger. A good, large rifle scope is important, as shots at longer distances may be necessary, and visibility may be poor because of snowfall, fog, or limited lighting levels. Folding or fixed-blade hunting knives are necessary for many purposes. Binoculars with large objective diameter are used to spot prey at great distances, sometimes in waning light.

Rifles (both bolt action and semi-automatic) of other calibers, shotguns, and other types of weapons may be used for other game such as ptarmigan, Arctic hares, and Arctic foxes, which are often encountered during a reindeer hunt.

=== Regulations and hunting licenses ===
Harvesting is governed by regulations and requires a hunting license indicating the number of animals to be harvested, as well as post-hunting reporting of results (a jawbone with teeth). Such licenses can be obtained by those who have established two years of residency. Special arrangements are made for tourists and trophy hunters. Information can be sought and licenses obtained (by application and payment) from the local municipality.

Airplanes, helicopters, and other motorized vehicles (such as snowmobiles), are not allowed to be used for hunting or land transport of animals or hunters. Boats are allowed for transport to and from hunting areas. A lead identification tag must be attached to the carcass until it is sold or used. The meat is owned by the hunter and no extra fees are charged for it.

In 2006 the open season extended from August 10 - September 15. In exceptional cases the dates can be changed, for example periods of bad weather and too much ice, resulting in a lengthening of the season. Winter hunting is an option for those specially licensed as commercial hunters (normally reserved for Inuit residents).

=== Game preparation and transport ===
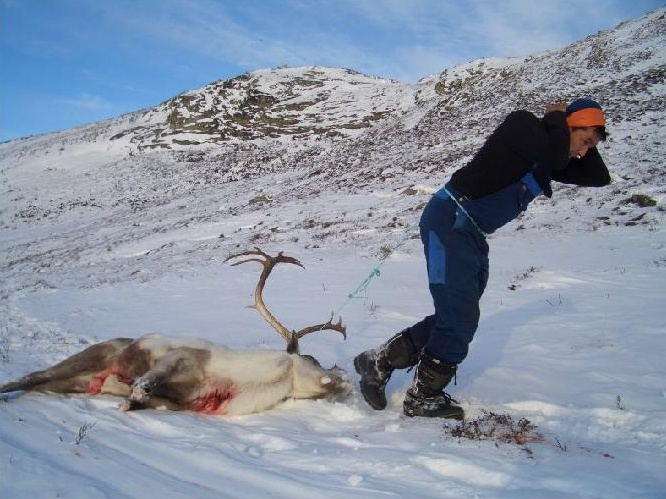
Hunter using a headband to drag a reindeer on snow

Once downed, a reindeer is quickly field dressed by removing the viscera. The skin, head, and viscera are often discarded and left for consumption by foxes, ravens, and other birds. The meat is kept cool to minimize decomposition and protected from blow-flies by the use of mesh game bags, and any fly eggs (very visible) and maggots are removed immediately. The cool climate makes it possible for the meat to be kept out in the open longer than in warmer climates, therefore a hunting expedition can last several days without a serious loss of meat quality. Once home again, the meat can be hung and aged for a few days before further processing.

Carrying a reindeer over a long distance in rugged mountainous terrain can be difficult and very strenuous. More than five kilometers each way is not uncommon. If the animal is very large, it may only be possible to transport one half at a time. In Greenland, reindeer meat is commonly carried over the shoulders, possibly tied to a backpack frame, or carried on the back with support from a headband, the last being a method preferred by the Inuit. Unskinned game may also be dragged on snow, or allowed to slide down steep, snow-covered hillsides, thus saving much work and freeing the hands for support while climbing downhill.

=== Hunting methods ===
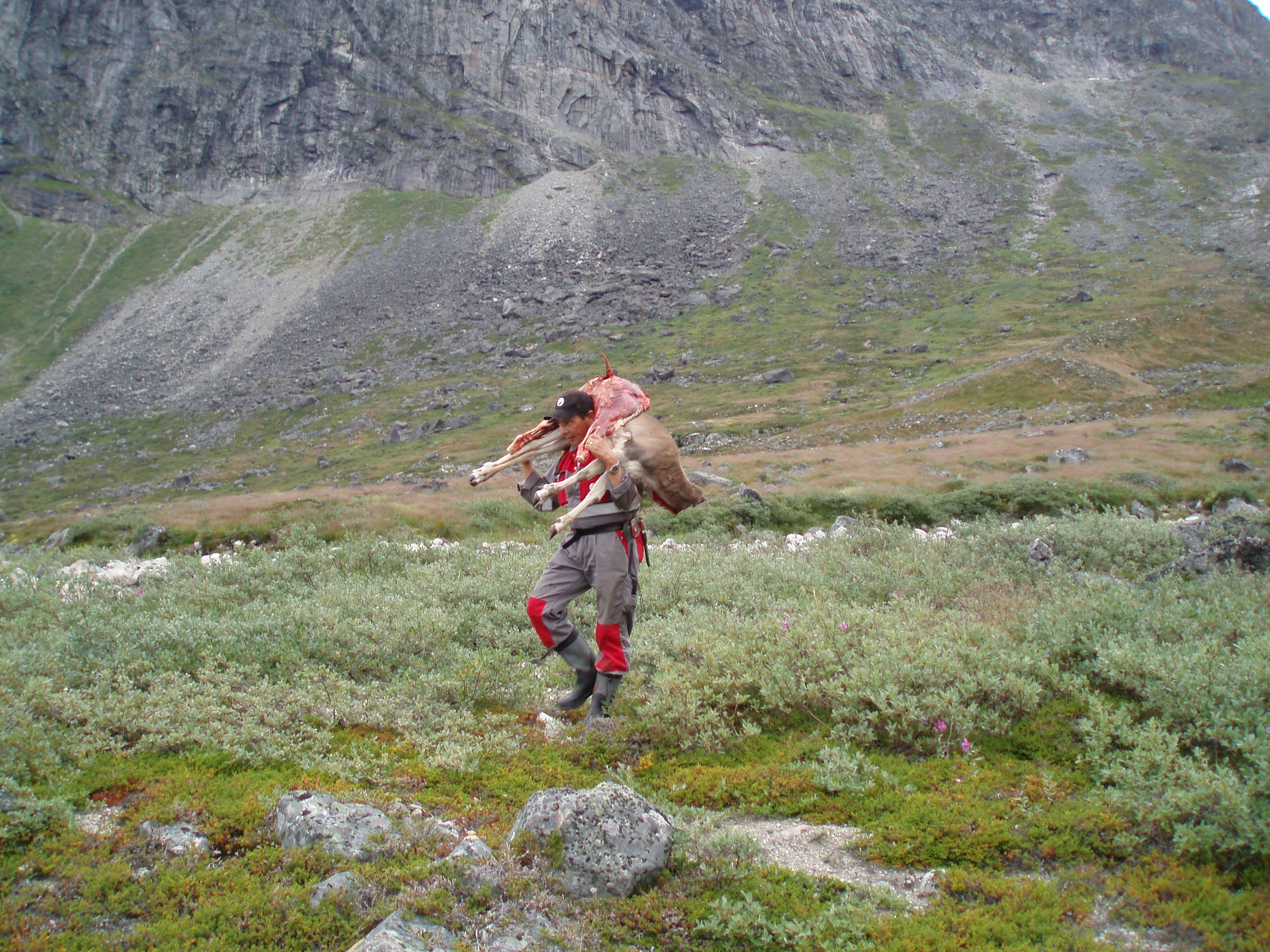
Hunter carrying reindeer meat

There are several hunting strategies that can be used for harvesting reindeer:

- Asking is seeking the advice of an experienced reindeer hunter.
- Scouting is a variety of tasks and techniques for finding reindeer to hunt.
- Glassing is the use of optical instruments (such as binoculars) to locate animals more easily.
- Blind or stand hunting is waiting where reindeer are likely to travel.
- Camouflage hunting is concealing oneself visually to blend in with the environment, for example using a white anorak in snowy weather.
- Still hunting is the practice of walking stealthily in search of animals.
- Stalking is the practice of walking stealthily in pursuit of identified animals.
- Tracking is interpreting and following physical evidence in the pursuit of animals.
- Drive hunting is flushing reindeer toward other hunters.

Note: Loose dogs, dog driving, and coursing are not allowed in Greenland.

== Hunting conditions in Greenland ==
A reindeer hunt can be a short afternoon outing without much equipment, or a week-long affair with all the equipment that such an endeavor requires. New hunters may experience a form of culture shock the first time they enter the wilderness, and may require mental acclimatization when returning to civilization. It may feel like a fleeting period of mental confusion, similar to the "sea legs" felt by inexperienced boaters.

Reindeer harvesting can be done in groups or alone, with lone hunting generally requiring extra safety precautions. While reindeer harvesting is usually a pleasant experience and the following problems may never be encountered, it can also be exhausting and does entail some degree of safety risk. Good hygiene and adequate hydration can protect against infections, diarrhea, and gastroenteritis. A small first aid kit should be carried when away from the campsite or boat, and preparations should be made for the various hazards of outdoor recreation. The terrain can be hilly, mountainous, uneven, and stony, with hidden crevices or holes. It may also be marshy, muddy, and wet. It may be necessary to cross streams and rivers, and slippery rocks present a hazard. If there is snow and ice, there can be cornices, crevasses, and avalanches, although snow can make it easier to spot and track reindeer.

The weather during the beginning of the autumn hunting season is often pleasant, relatively warm, and mild, but it can change very quickly. Hunters may encounter fog, rain, wind, and winter conditions. Occasionally the situation can quickly approach a worst-case scenario with events such as katabatic winds, storms, snow, hail, sleet, freezing rain, blizzards, and polar cyclones, even in the late summer. Lack of preparation can have fatal consequences.

Using a compass in Greenland involves accounting for a very extreme magnetic declination. Failure to calculate correctly can send a hunter in the wrong direction, leading to complete loss of bearings. Getting lost in bad weather can waste precious time, forcing the hunter to overnight in very wet, cold, and unpleasant conditions. Hypothermia can further complicate matters and decrease the hunter's ability to think clearly, causing them to lose their bearings even more. A fight for survival may then ensue. Deaths are relatively rare, but they do happen.

== See also ==
- Arctic Council
- Deer hunting
- International Council for Game and Wildlife Conservation
- Nujalik, the Inuit goddess of hunting on land
- Polar bear hunting
- Tekkeitsertok, an Inuit god of hunting and the master of caribou

== Notes and references ==
=== References ===
- Muus, B., F. Salomonsen and C. Vibe, 1990. Grønlands fauna (Fisk, Fugle, Pattedyr). Gyldendalske Boghandel, Nordisk Forlag A/S København, 464 p. (in Danish).
- Dr. Christine Cuyler - Research scientist, reindeer expert, extensive list of publications
- Peoples of the Reindeer. - Michel Bouchard, University of the Arctic. (.pdf file)
