= List of submissions to the 83rd Academy Awards for Best Foreign Language Film =

2010 Best Foreign Language Film submissions
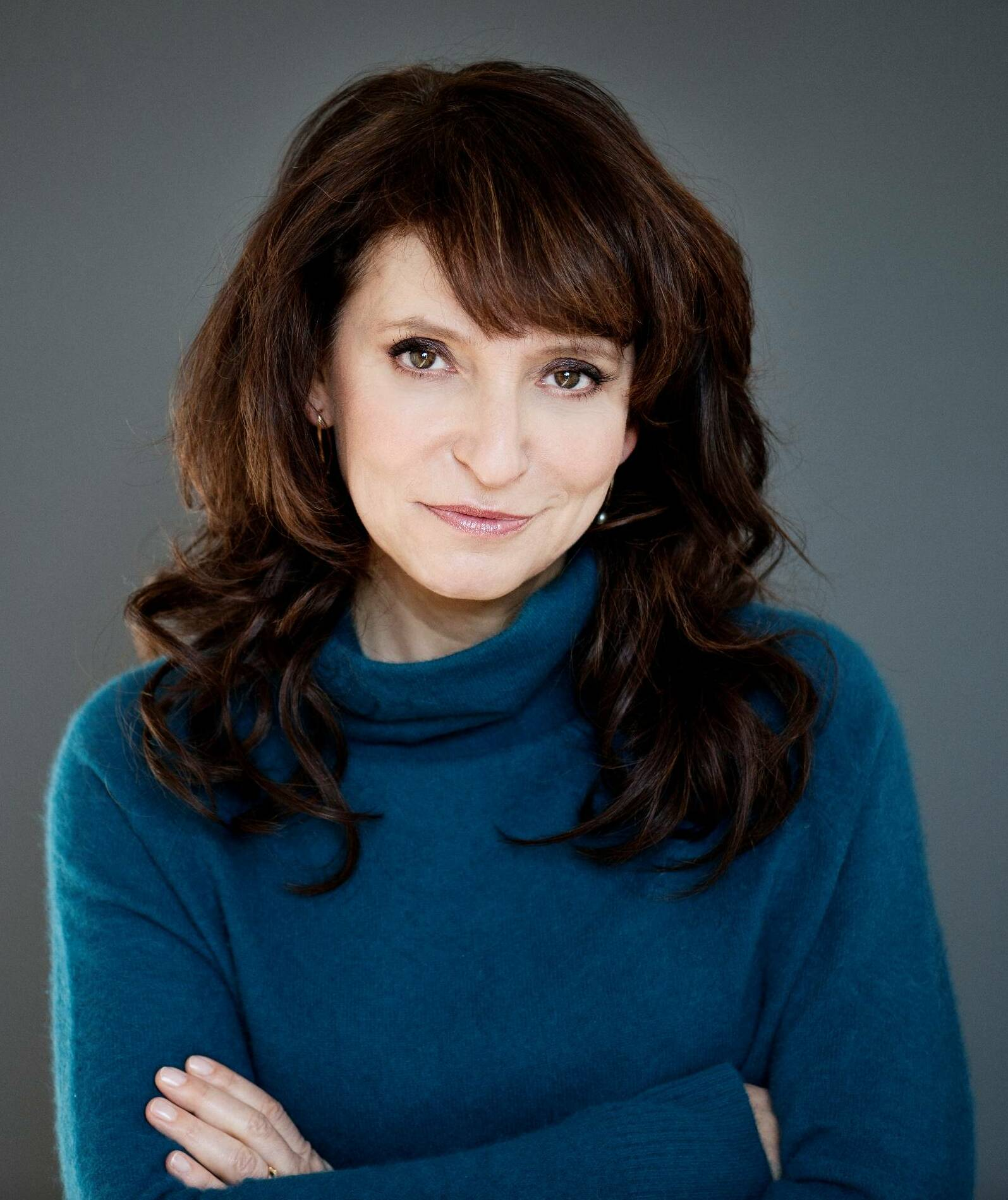
- Susanne Bier directed In a Better World, which won the year's award.

Highlights
- Oscar winner: (Denmark) In a Better World
- Submissions: 66
- Debuts: 2
- Total eligible: 66

This is a list of submissions to the 83rd Academy Awards for the Best Foreign Language Film. The Academy of Motion Picture Arts and Sciences (AMPAS) has invited the film industries of various countries to submit their best film for the Academy Award for Best Foreign Language Film every year since the award was created in 1956. The award is presented annually by the Academy to a feature-length motion picture produced outside the United States that contains primarily non-English dialogue. The Foreign Language Film Award Committee oversees the process and reviews all the submitted films.

For the 83rd Academy Awards, the submitted motion pictures must have first been released theatrically in their respective countries between 1 October 2009 and 30 September 2010. The deadline for submissions to the Academy was 1 October 2010. 66 countries submitted films and were found to be eligible by AMPAS and screened for voters. Ethiopia and Greenland submitted films for the first time. After the 9-film shortlist was announced on 19 January 2011, the five nominees were announced on 25 January 2011.

Denmark won the award for the third time with In a Better World by Susanne Bier.

== Submissions ==
Submitting country	Film title used in nomination	Original title	Language(s)	Director(s)	Result
Afghanistan	The Black Tulip	لاله سیاه	Dari, Pashto, English, Arabic, Italian	Sonia Nassery Cole	Not nominated
Albania	East, West, East	Lindje, perëndim, lindje	Albanian, Italian, Slovene, Serbian	Gjergj Xhuvani	Not nominated
Algeria	Outside the Law	Hors-la-loi / خارجون عن القانون	French, Arabic, English	Rachid Bouchareb	Nominated
Argentina	Carancho		Spanish	Pablo Trapero	Not nominated
Austria	La pivellina		Italian	Tizza Covi and Rainer Frimmel	Not nominated
Azerbaijan	The Precinct	Sahə	Azerbaijani, Russian, Turkish	Ilgar Safat	Not nominated
Bangladesh	Third Person Singular Number	থার্ড পারসন সিঙ্গুলার নাম্বার	Bengali	Mostofa Sarwar Farooki	Not nominated
Belgium	Illegal	Illègal	French, Russian, English	Olivier Masset-Depasse	Not nominated
Bosnia and Herzegovina	Cirkus Columbia		Bosnian, English	Danis Tanović	Not nominated
Brazil	Lula, the Son of Brazil	Lula, o Filho do Brasil	Brazilian Portuguese	Fábio Barreto	Not nominated
Bulgaria	Eastern Plays	Източни пиеси	Bulgarian, Turkish, English	Kamen Kalev	Not nominated
Canada	Incendies		French, Arabic, English	Denis Villeneuve	Nominated
Chile	The Life of Fish	La vida de los peces	Spanish	Matías Bize	Not nominated
China	Aftershock	唐山大地震	Tangshan Mandarin	Feng Xiaogang	Not nominated
Colombia	Crab Trap	El vuelco del cangrejo	Spanish	Óscar Ruiz Navia	Not nominated
Costa Rica	Of Love and Other Demons	Del amor y otros demonios	Spanish	Hilda Hidalgo	Not nominated
Croatia	The Blacks	Crnci	Croatian	Goran Devic and Zvonimir Juric	Not nominated
Czech Republic	Kawasaki's Rose	Kawasakiho růže	Czech, Swedish, English	Jan Hřebejk	Not nominated
Denmark	In a Better World	Hævnen	Danish, Swedish, English, Arabic, Catalan, Spanish	Susanne Bier	Won Academy Award
Egypt	Messages from the Sea	رسائل البحر	Arabic	Daoud Abdel Sayed	Not nominated
Estonia	The Temptation of St. Tony	Püha Tõnu kiusamine	Estonian, Russian, English, French, German	Veiko Õunpuu	Not nominated
Ethiopia	The Athlete	እትሌቱ	Amharic, English, Oromo, Norwegian	Davey Frankel and Rasselas Lakew	Not nominated
Finland	Steam of Life	Miesten vuoro	Finnish, Northern Sámi	Joonas Berghäll and Mika Hotakainen	Not nominated
France	Of Gods and Men	Des hommes et des dieux	French, Arabic	Xavier Beauvois	Not nominated
Georgia	Street Days	ქუჩის დღეები	Georgian	Levan Koguashvili	Not nominated
Germany	When We Leave	Die Fremde	German, Turkish	Feo Aladag	Not nominated
Greece	Dogtooth	Κυνόδοντας	Greek	Yorgos Lanthimos	Nominated
Greenland	Nuummioq		Greenlandic, Danish	Torben Bech and Otto Rosing	Not nominated
Hong Kong	Echoes of the Rainbow	歲月神偷	Cantonese, English, Mandarin, French, Shanghainese	Alex Law	Not nominated
Hungary	Bibliothèque Pascal		Romanian, Hungarian, English	Szabolcs Hajdu	Not nominated
Iceland	Mamma Gogo	Mamma Gógó	Icelandic	Friðrik Þór Friðriksson	Not nominated
India	Peepli Live	पीपली लाइव	Hindi, Awadhi, Bundeli, English	Anusha Rizvi	Not nominated
Indonesia	How Funny (This Country Is)	Alangkah Lucunya (Negeri Ini)	Indonesian	Deddy Mizwar	Not nominated
Iran	Farewell Baghdad	بدرود بغداد	Arabic, English, Persian	Mehdi Naderi	Not nominated
Iraq	Son of Babylon	ابن بابل	Arabic, Central Kurdish	Mohamed al-Daradji	Not nominated
Israel	The Human Resources Manager	שליחותו-של-הממונה-על-משאבי-אנוש	Hebrew, Romanian, English	Eran Riklis	Not nominated
Italy	The First Beautiful Thing	La prima cosa bella	Italian, Pisano-Livornese Tuscan	Paolo Virzì	Not nominated
Japan	Confessions	告白	Japanese	Tetsuya Nakashima	Made shortlist
Kazakhstan	Strayed	Заблудившийся	Russian	Akan Satayev	Not nominated
Kyrgyzstan	The Light Thief	Свет-аке	Kyrgyz	Aktan Arym Kubat	Not nominated
Latvia	Hong Kong Confidential	Amaya	Cantonese, Japanese, English	Māris Martinsons	Not nominated
(North Macedonia) Macedonia	Mothers	Мајки	Macedonian	Milčo Mančevski	Not nominated
Mexico	Biutiful		Spanish, Mandarin, Wolof	Alejandro González Iñárritu	Nominated
Netherlands	Tirza		Dutch, English	Rudolf van den Berg	Not nominated
Nicaragua	La Yuma		Spanish	Florence Jaugey	Not nominated
Norway	Angel	Engelen	Norwegian, Swedish	Margreth Olin	Not nominated
Peru	Undertow	Contracorriente	Spanish	Javier Fuentes-León	Not nominated
Philippines	Noy		Filipino, English	Dondon Santos	Not nominated
Poland	All That I Love	Wszystko, co kocham	Polish	Jacek Borcuch	Not nominated
Portugal	To Die Like a Man	Morrer Como Um Homem	Portuguese, German, English	João Pedro Rodrigues	Not nominated
Puerto Rico	Lie	Miente	Spanish	Rafi Mercado	Not nominated
Romania	If I Want to Whistle, I Whistle	Eu cand vreau sa fluier, fluier	Romanian	Florin Șerban	Not nominated
Russia	The Edge	Край	Russian, German	Alexei Uchitel	Not nominated
Serbia	Besa	Беса	Serbian, Albanian, Slovene, German	Srđan Karanović	Not nominated
Slovakia	The Border	Hranica	Hungarian, Slovak, Ukrainian	Jaroslav Vojtek	Not nominated
Slovenia	9:06		Slovene	Igor Šterk	Not nominated
South Africa	Life, Above All		Northern Sotho	Oliver Schmitz	Made shortlist
South Korea	A Barefoot Dream	맨발의 꿈	Korean, Tetum, English, Indonesian	Kim Tae-kyun	Not nominated
Spain	Even the Rain	También la lluvia	Spanish, South Bolivian Quechua, English	Icíar Bollaín	Made shortlist
Sweden	Simple Simon	I rymden finns inga känslor	Swedish, English	Andreas Öhman	Made shortlist
Switzerland	The Little Room	La petite chambre	French	Stéphanie Chuat and Véronique Reymond	Not nominated
Taiwan	Monga	艋舺	Taiwanese Hokkien, Mandarin	Doze Niu	Not nominated
Thailand	Uncle Boonmee Who Can Recall His Past Lives	ลุงบุญมีระลึกชาติ	Isan, Thai, Lao	Apichatpong Weerasethakul	Not nominated
Turkey	Honey	Bal	Turkish	Semih Kaplanoğlu	Not nominated
Uruguay	A Useful Life	La vida útil	Spanish	Federico Veiroj	Not nominated
Venezuela	Brother	Hermano	Spanish	Marcel Rasquin	Not nominated

== Notes ==
- Taiwan originally submitted Hear Me by Cheng Fen-fen, which was deemed to be ineligible since its August 2009 release date meant that it was eligible only for the previous year.
- Vietnam has submitted four films in the past five years. Their official nominating body, the Vietnam Cinema Administration's International Relations Department, has indicated an interest in participating and has said they have nine eligible films. However, as of 5 October 2010, they had made no official announcement.
- Cuba, Lithuania, and Luxembourg informed Variety before the deadline that they would not participate in this year's competition.
