= Culture of Greenland =

The culture of Greenland has much in common with Greenlandic Inuit tradition, as the majority of people are descended from Inuit. Many people still go ice fishing and there are annual dog-sled races in which everyone with a team participates.

However, Greenland has now become somewhat of a tourist attraction. It holds contests to attract tourists such as dog racing, ice fishing, hiking, and cross country racing.

== Inuit ==
Inuit account for 81% (2005) of the population of Greenland. Hunting is iconic to their culture and most Greenlanders still hunt at least part-time to supplement their diet and provide skins for clothing and kayaks.

== Thule region ==
The northwest corner of Greenland is known as the Thule region. It is roughly the size of Germany, but inhabited by less than 1,000 people. The northernmost year-round communities on earth (Siorapaluk, Moriusaq, Savissivik, Qeqertat, and Qaanaaq) are in the Thule region. Siorapaluk, with approximately 80 residents, is just 730 nautical miles (1,360 km) from the North Pole.

Currently, though most families in the Thule region need at least one member in salaried employment in order to pay for electricity and other modern amenities, hunting remains a revered profession. Traditional foods like seal, walrus, narwhal and caribou are consumed frequently. Hunters still wear hand-made polar bear skin garments, caribou anoraks and skin boots for warmth on winter hunting trips. Many of the men maintain world-class kayaking and harpoon-throwing skills.

== Inuit identity as hunters ==
=== Cultural status of the hunting experience ===
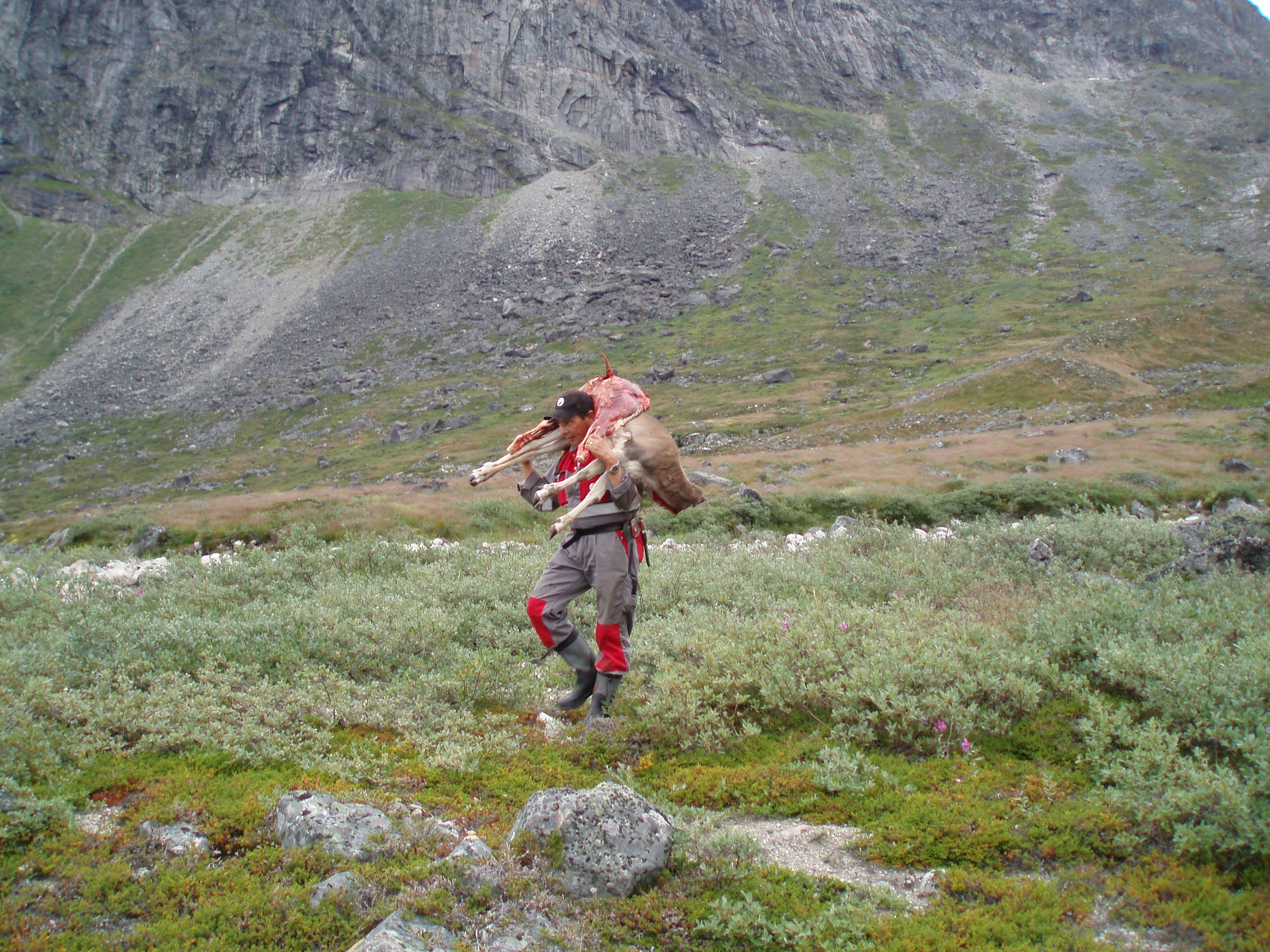
Hunter carrying reindeer meat.

Hunting has always been an important aspect of the Greenland Inuit culture:

"The Inuit culture is the most pure hunting culture in existence. Having adapted to the extreme living conditions in the High Arctic of the North American continent for at least four thousand years, Inuit are not even hunter-gatherers. Inuit are hunters, pure and simple." (Henriette Rasmussen, Minister in Greenland Home Rule Government)

Even today hunting is important as stated by the Greenland Home Rule Government:

"Hunting is the heart and soul of Greenlandic culture.... Hunting is also very important from a cultural perspective. In a society such as Greenland, which for centuries was based on subsistence hunting (until about 50 years ago), hunting is still of great cultural importance. Irrespective of the fact that most live like wage-earners in a modern industrial society, many Greenlanders' identity is still deeply rooted in the hunting."

Reindeer hunting has a special status in the hearts of the populace. Shooting a musk ox provides four times as much meat as a reindeer, but "Greenlanders would much rather have caribou or reindeer meat than musk or ox meat," says Josephine Nymand. "But the experience is just as important as the meat," points out Peter Nielsen, Head of Office at the Ministry of Environment and Nature. "It is simply the most wonderful part of the year. The trips in for the caribou hunt in the beautiful autumn weather have a great social and physical meaning for people's wellbeing. It has many functions."

=== Inuit culture ===
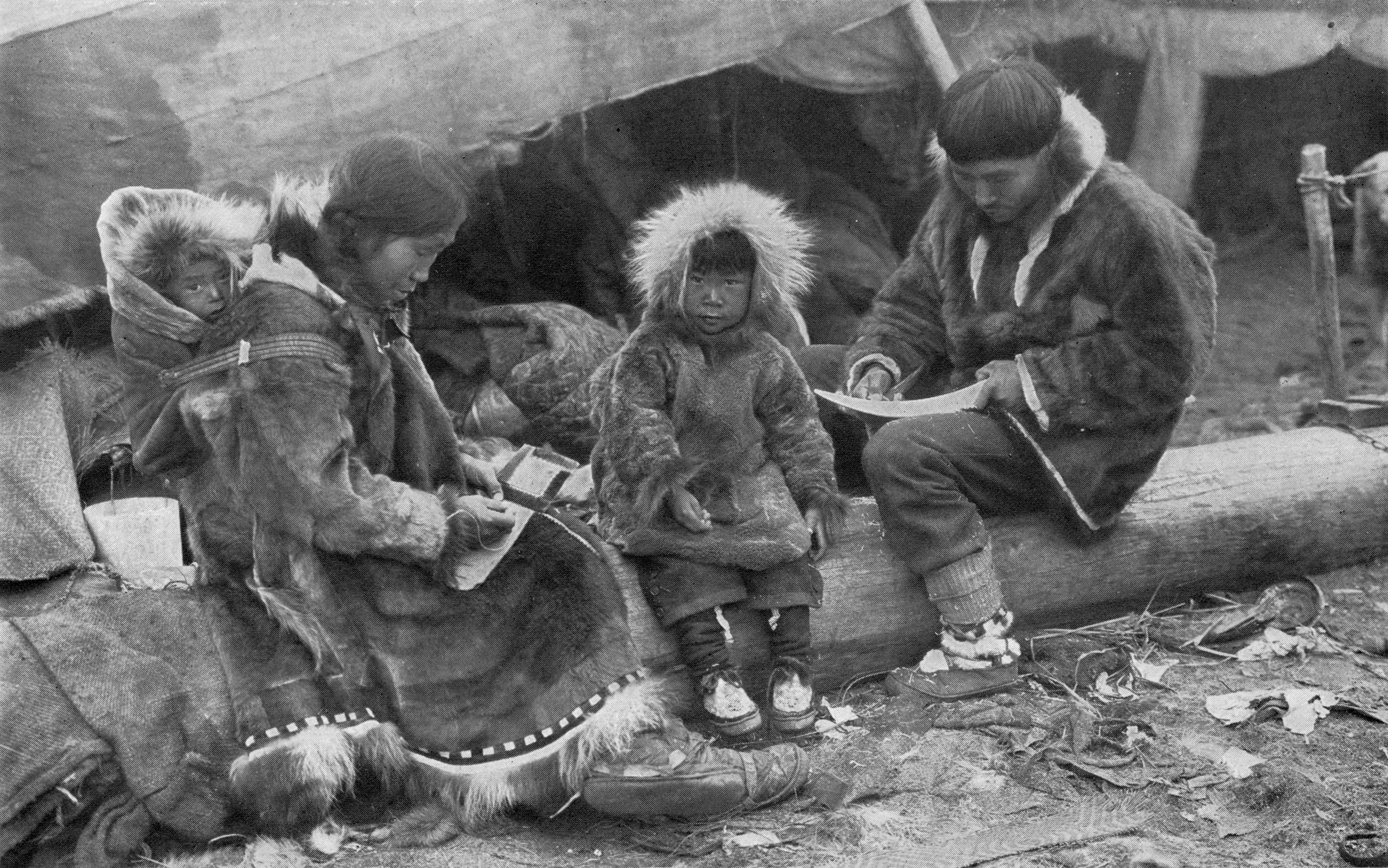
An Inuit family (1917)

The long history of mutual dependence between humans and reindeer necessitates continuing efforts to safeguard their relationship and the welfare of both parties. Reindeer hunting – which is also commonplace in many other parts of the world – is considered so vital to the cultural heritage of certain groups that there is an attempt being made to get it placed on UNESCO's World Heritage List.

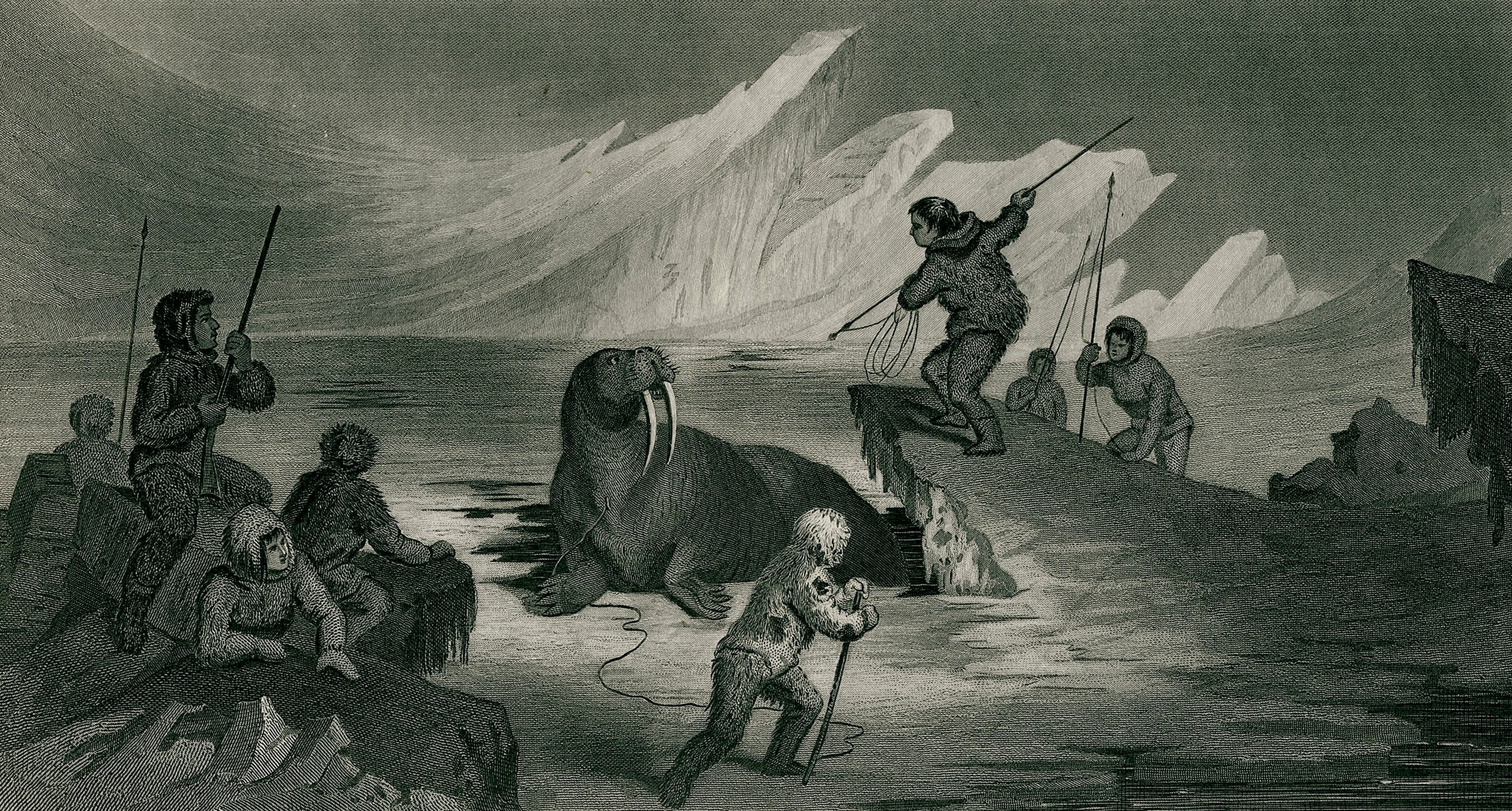
A Walrus hunt in 1855.

The identity of the Inuit is closely tied to their geography, history and their attitudes toward hunting – "For Inuit, ecology, hunting and culture are synonymous". Their identity as hunters is under attack. Those attacks are "viewed in the Arctic as a direct assault on culture, identity as well as sustainable use", and Inuit are reacting:

"... for the Inuit, animal rights campaigns are just the latest in a long litany of religious, industry, and government policies imposed by outsiders – policies which ignore Inuit values and realities, and threaten the survival of one of the world's last remaining aboriginal hunting cultures."

Therefore, the circumpolar peoples and their organizations are actively engaged in attempts to protect their welfare, identity, interests, and culture, including their hunting culture. The "Kuujjuaq Declaration" addressed perceived attacks on their autonomy and rights, and recommended that the Inuit Circumpolar Council "undertake a comprehensive study on how best to address global forces, such as the 'animal rights' and other destructive movements that aim to destroy Inuit sustainable use of living resources, and to report back to the next General Assembly on its findings." The International Arctic Science Committee shares these viewpoints and therefore one of its objectives is to study the "sustainable use of living resources of high value to Arctic residents."

=== Controversy ===
As valued as it is, traditional hunting in Greenland is under tremendous stress. Pressure from environmental and conservation groups has led Greenland's Home Rule Government to set hunting limits for most species. In January 2006, a 150 animal limit was set for the most prized of all Greenlandic animals, the polar bear.

=== Climate change ===
Another pressure for Greenland's hunters is climate change. According to the Arctic Climate Impact Assessment, the largest study ever conducted on the effects of warming in the Arctic, winter temperatures above the 63rd parallel north have increased on average, by 2 to 5 Celsius over the past 50 years and could rise by yet another 10. That increase is having a dramatic effect on the wildlife, environment and culture of the high Arctic. In an interview for the Arctic I.C.C.E. Project, Savissavik hunter Simon Eliason said hunters are spending more time in the fjords (rather than on the sea ice) because there is less sea ice on which to hunt seal, walrus and polar bear. He also said that hunters who net seals under the ice in winter must pull in those nets within hours after an animal is caught. Worms and parasites that the hunters have never seen before rapidly riddle and destroy the carcasses if they are left in the water very long. Eliassen says he believes the parasites have moved north with the warmer water.

== Traditional skills at risk ==
Finally, traditional Thule culture is threatened by development and the growing cash-based economy. Even the smallest settlements in northwest Greenland have electricity today, albeit a small supply of electricity powered by diesel generators. Having electricity, as well as ammunition, hunting rifles and other store-bought products, means that at least one member of every family must be in salaried employment. In most cases, that member is a woman—a wife, daughter or mother. The jobs held by the women allow the men to continue to hunt full-time. But one consequence of this division of labor is that Thule women are losing their knowledge of traditional skills faster than the men. These skills include flensing, treating and sewing skins.

== See also ==
- Demographics of Greenland
- Greenland
- Greenlandic Inuit
- Kalaallisut language
- List of Greenlandic artists
- Music of Greenland
- Greenlandic cuisine
- Polar bear hunting
- Reindeer hunting in Greenland
