= List of Danish films of 2014 =

The Danish film industry produced over fifty feature films in 2014. This article fully lists all non-pornographic films, including short films, that had a release date in that year and which were at least partly made in Denmark. It does not include films first released in previous years that had release dates in 2014. It does, however, include films produced by Greenland and the Faroe Islands (self-governing Danish territories), which are also included in List of Greenlandic films of 2014 and List of Faroese films of 2014 respectively.
Also included is an overview of the major events in Danish film, including film festivals and awards ceremonies, as well as lists of those films that have been particularly well received, both critically and financially.

== Major releases ==
Opening		Title	Cast and Crew	Studio	Genre(s)	Ref.
F E B R U A R Y	1	The Lego Movie	Directors: Phil Lord, Christopher Miller; Cast: Chris Pratt, Will Ferrell, Elizabeth Banks, Will Arnett, Nick Offerman, Alison Brie, Charlie Day, Liam Neeson, Morgan Freeman	Warner Bros. Pictures	Adventure; Comedy; Animation; Fantasy	
M A Y	15	The Man Who Saved the World	Director: Peter Anthony; Cast: Stanislav Petrov, Nataliya Vdovina, Sergey Shnyryov		Documentary	
M A Y	17	The Salvation	Director: Kristian Levring; Cast: Mads Mikkelsen, Eva Green, Eric Cantona, Mikael Persbrandt, Jeffrey Dean Morgan, Jonathan Pryce, Michael Raymond-James	Nordisk Film	Western	
M A Y	18	Force Majeure	Director: Ruben Östlund; Cast: Johannes Bah Kuhnke, Lisa Loven Kongsli, Clara Wettergre, Vincent Wettergren, Kristofer Hivju, Fanni Metelius	TriArt Film	Drama	
M A Y	18	Jauja	Director: Lisandro Alonso; Cast: Viggo Mortensen	NDM	Historical; Drama	
M A Y	19	When Animals Dream	Director: Jonas Alexander Arnby; Cast: Lars Mikkelsen, Jakob Oftebro, Sonja Richter	AlphaVille Pictures Copenhagen	Drama; Horror; Mystery	
A U G U S T	28	Speed Walking	Director: Niels Arden Oplev; Cast: Anders W. Berthelsen, Sidse Babett Knudsen, Pilou Asbæk, Villads Bøye	Nordisk Film	Drama	
S E P T E M B E R	2	A Pigeon Sat on a Branch Reflecting on Existence	Director: Roy Andersson; Cast: Nisse Vestblom, Holger Andersson	Roy Andersson Filmproduktion AB	Comedy; Drama	
S E P T E M B E R	6	Itsi Bitsi	Director: Ole Christian Madsen; Cast: Thure Lindhardt		Drama	
S E P T E M B E R	6	Song of the Sea	Director: Tomm Moore; Cast: David Rawle, Brendan Gleeson, Fionnula Flanagan, Lisa Hannigan, Lucy O'Connell, Jon Kenny, Pat Shortt, Colm Ó Snodaigh, Liam Hourican, Kevin Swierszcz	StudioCanal	Animation; Fantasy	
S E P T E M B E R	9	A Second Chance	Director: Susanne Bier; Cast: Nikolaj Coster-Waldau, Ulrich Thomsen, Maria Bonnevie, Nikolaj Lie Kaas, Lykke May Andersen	Nordisk Film	Thriller	
S E P T E M B E R	20	Silent Heart	Director: Bille August; Cast: Ghita Nørby, Morten Grunwald, Paprika Steen, Jens Albinus	Level K	Drama	
O C T O B E R	2	The Absent One	Director: Mikkel Nørgaard; Cast: Nikolaj Lie Kaas, Fares Fares, Pilou Asbæk, Sarah-Sofie Boussnina, Danica Curcic		Crime; Mystery; Thriller	
O C T O B E R	3	Copenhagen	Director: Mark Raso; Cast: Gethin Anthony, Frederikke Dahl Hansen, Sebastian Armesto, Olivia Grant, Mille Dinesen, Baard Owe, Tamzin Merchant	Fidelio Films	Adventure	

== Minor releases ==
Title	Director	Release Date	Genre
80000 Thoughts	Michele Mwikali Lauritsen	1 November 2014 (Denmark)	Drama
Ækte vare	Fenar Ahmad	8 May 2014 (Denmark)	Drama
All Inclusive	Hella Joof	25 December 2014 (Denmark)	Comedy
Antboy: Revenge of the Red Fury	Ask Hasselbalch	25 December 2014 (Denmark)	Adventure
Beyond Beyond	Esben Toft Jacobsen	21 March 2014 (Sweden)	Animation
Copenhague A Love Story	Philippe Lesage		Biography
Crumbs: All at Stake	Barbara Topsøe-Rothenborg	2 October 2014 (Denmark)	Comedy
Cykelmyggen og minibillen	Jannik Hastrup	12 June 2014 (Denmark)	Animation
Danny's Doomsday	Martin Barnewitz	9 October 2014 (Denmark)	Adventure
Dark Samurai	Sidney Lexy Plaut	21 November 2014 (Poland)	Crime
Diallo's Odysee	Helle Toft Jensen		Musical
DJØF med løg(n) - En bureaukrats bekendelser	Per Helge Sørensen	2014 (Denmark)	Comedy
El escarabajo de oro	Alejo Moguillansky	13 October 2014 (UK)	
Encounters	Anders Johannes Bukh	30 October 2014 (Denmark)	Horror
Familien Jul	Carsten Rudolf	20 November 2014 (Denmark)	Comedy
Father of Four	Giacomo Campeotto	6 February 2014 (Denmark)	Comedy
Helt Perfekt	Elias Ehlers	2014 (Denmark)	Comedy
I Am Here	Anders Morgenthaler	9 January 2015 (Denmark)	Drama
Klumpfisken	Søren Balle	6 March 2014 (Denmark)	Comedy
Kolbøttefabrikken	Morten Boesdal Halvorsen	29 May 2014 (Denmark)	Comedy
Limbo	Anna Sofie Hartmann	24 September 2015 (Germany)	Drama
Linda P's Hovedpine?	Linda Pedersen	3 November 2014 (Denmark)	Comedy
Ludo	Katrin Ottarsdóttir	September 2014 (Faroe Islands)	Drama
Lulu	Caroline Sascha Cogez	1 April 2014 (Denmark)	Drama
Mare	Max Patrick Thuesen	1 June 2014 (Denmark)	Horror
Monstrosity	Kasper Juhl	9 July 2014 (Denmark)	Horror
Nordic Factory	Milad Alami	15 May 2014 (France)	Drama
On the Edge	Christian E. Christiansen	26 June 2014 (Denmark)	Drama
Paris of the North	Hafsteinn Gunnar Sigurðsson	2014 (Iceland)	Comedy
Someone You Love	Pernille Fischer Christensen	24 April 2014 (Denmark)	Drama
Stille hjerte	Bille August	13 November 2014 (Denmark)	Drama
The Boy with the Golden Pants	Ella Lemhagen	26 September 2014 (Sweden)	Adventure
The Cartel	Charlotte Sachs Bostrup	27 February 2014 (Denmark)	Drama
The Golden Horse	Reinis Kalnaellis	August 2014 (Latvia)	Animation
The Reunion 2: The Funeral	Mikkel Serup	6 February 2014 (Denmark)	Comedy
The Word	Anna Kazejak	14 March 2014 (Poland)	Drama
Three Brothers	Jan Sverák	14 August 2014 (Czech Republic)	Comedy
Threesome	Claus Bjerre	11 September 2014 (Denmark)	Comedy
Unnuap Taarnerpaaffiani	Malik Kleist	21 November 2014 (Greenland)	Horror
Upstart	James Barclay	16 October 2014 (Canada)	Drama
Uyirvarai Iniththaai	K.S. Thurai	22 March 2014 (Denmark)	Comedy

== See also ==
- 2014 in film
- 2014 in Denmark
- Cinema of Denmark
- List of Danish submissions for the Academy Award for Best Foreign Language Film
- List of Faroese films of 2014
- List of Greenlandic films of 2014
