= Call of the Ice =

2016 film by Mike Magidson

- Directed by: Mike Magidson; Xavier Liberman
- Written by: Mike Magidson
- Produced by: Caroline Broussaud; Philippe Molins
- Starring: Mike Magidson; Jacob "Uunartoq" Lovstrom
- Narrated by: Mike Magidson
- Cinematography: Xavier Liberman; Mike Magidson
- Edited by: Mike Magidson; Delphine Bajraktaraj Cohen
- Music by: Karina Moeller; Kristof Jul Reenberg
- Production companies: MFP Films; U.P.I. Films; Planète+ (with the participation of)
- Release date: 23 November 2016 (France)
- Running time: 104 minutes
- Countries: France; Greenland
- Language: English

Call of the Ice is a 2016 French-Greenlandic documentary film about the director's effort to learn to survive a Greenland winter while living as an Inuk hunter.

== Synopsis ==
The film documents American-born film director, Mike Magidson, as he travels to Uummannaq, Greenland—where he has previously made three films: Ice School (2000), La longue trace (2003), and Inuk (2012). Mentored and outfitted by the local Inuit community, Magidson attempts to survive for several weeks, alone on an ice floe, using dog sleds to fish and hunt seal.
