= Running Against the Wind =

2019 film

- Film poster
- Directed by: Jan Philipp Weyl
- Written by: Jan Philipp Weyl; Michael Wogh
- Produced by: Saol Adinew Endale; Samerawit Seid Kekebo; Chris Naumann; Andreas Seck; Jan Philipp Weyl
- Starring: Mikiyas Wolde; Ashenafi Nigusu
- Cinematography: Mateusz Smolka
- Edited by: Amanuel Tilahun Tadesse
- Music by: Teddy Mak; Sileshi Demissie; Kenny Allen; Lew Berhane
- Release date: 14 September 2019
- Running time: 116 minutes
- Country: Ethiopia
- Language: Amharic

Running Against the Wind (Amharic: የነፋሱ ፍልሚያ, romanized: yenefasu filimīya) is a 2019 Ethiopian drama film directed by Jan Philipp Weyl. It was selected as the Ethiopian entry for the Best International Feature Film at the 92nd Academy Awards, but it was not nominated.

== Plot ==
One brother dreams of becoming an Olympic runner while the other aspires to be a photographer. They go separate ways, but their paths cross again as adults.

Abdi (Ashenafi Nigusu) and Solomon (Mikias Wolde) are childhood friends who grow up in rural Ethiopia. Their paths diverge dramatically when Solomon runs away to the big city with dreams of becoming a photographer, only to end up on the streets, scraping for food and mixing with bad company. Ten years later, Abdi, who idolises the Olympic runner Haile Gebrselassie, also moves to the capital, where he continues training and even wins a national championship. After an emotional reunion, Abdi tries to pull Solomon out of his precarious situation, but fate has other plans.

The film explores the complexities of brotherhood, be it the bond between Solomon and his fellow outcasts, or the camaraderie among Abdi's athletic team. Though perhaps not always assured in their performances, Nigusu and Wolde capture their characters' first hug after years apart in a beautifully bittersweet moment. Shyly smiling at each other, the two young men suddenly and movingly revert to their childhood selves.

== Cast ==
- Mikias Wolde as Solomon
- Ashenafi Nigusu as Abdi
- Joseph Reta Belay as Kiflom
- Samrawit Desalegn as Genet
- Genene Alemu as Coach

== See also ==
- List of submissions to the 92nd Academy Awards for Best International Feature Film
- List of Ethiopian submissions for the Academy Award for Best International Feature Film
