= The Athlete (2009 film) =

2009 film

- Film poster
- Directed by: Davey Frankel; Rasselas Lakew
- Written by: Davey Frankel; Rasselas Lakew; Mikael Aemiro Awake
- Produced by: Davey Frankel; Rasselas Lakew
- Starring: Rasselas Lakew
- Edited by: Davey Frankel
- Release date: June 2009 (EIFF)
- Running time: 93 minutes
- Country: Ethiopia
- Languages: Amharic, English, Oromo, Norwegian

The Athlete (Amharic: እትሌቱ, Atletu) is a 2009 Ethiopian drama film directed by Davey Frankel and Rasselas Lakew. The film was selected as the Ethiopian entry for the Best Foreign Language Film at the 83rd Academy Awards, but it did not make the final shortlist. It was the first Ethiopian film to be submitted in the category for Best Foreign Language Film. The film has been reviewed in an international journal.

A mixture of fiction and stock footage, The Athlete is a portrait of the marathon runner from Ethiopia, Abebe Bikila. In 1960, he participated in the Rome Olympic Games as a complete unknown. However, the son of a shepherd ran barefoot and won the gold medal. Four years later, he repeated his feat at the Tokyo Olympic Games, becoming the first man to win the Olympic marathon twice in a row. A few years later, he suffered a car accident and lost the use of his legs. He died four years later.

== Cast ==
- Rasselas Lakew as Abebe Bikila
- Dag Malmberg as Onni
- Ruta Gedmintas as Charlotte
- Abba Waka Dessalegn as The Priest

== See also ==
- List of submissions to the 83rd Academy Awards for Best Foreign Language Film
- List of Ethiopian submissions for the Academy Award for Best Foreign Language Film
- Athletics at the 1960 Summer Olympics – Men's marathon
