= List of Greenlandic submissions for the Academy Award for Best International Feature Film =

List of films

Best International Feature Film submissions from Greenland

Highlights
- Debut: 2010
- Submissions: 3
- Nominations: none
- Oscar winners: none

Greenland has submitted films for the Academy Award for Best International Feature Film (Note: The category was previously named the Academy Award for Best Foreign Language Film, but this was changed to the Academy Award for Best International Feature Film in April 2019, after the Academy deemed the word "Foreign" to be outdated.) since 2010. The award is handed out annually by the United States Academy of Motion Picture Arts and Sciences to a feature-length motion picture produced outside the United States that contains primarily non-English dialogue. It was not created until the 1956 Academy Awards, in which a competitive Academy Award of Merit, known as the Best Foreign Language Film Award, was created for non-English speaking films, and has been given annually since.

Even though Greenland is only an autonomous territory of Denmark, thus not an independent country, AMPAS granted the territory autonomy to submit films for the category, following the same rules granted to Hong Kong.

As of 2026, Greenland has submitted three films, but none of them were nominated.

== Submissions ==
The Academy of Motion Picture Arts and Sciences has invited the film industries of various countries to submit their best film for the Academy Award for Best International Feature Film since 1956. The International Feature Film Committee oversees the process and reviews all the submitted films. Following this, they vote via secret ballot to determine the five nominees for the award.

Greenland submitted a film for the first time in 2010. However, Denmark had submit a Greenlandic film before, Qivitoq – Fjeldgængeren in 1956.

Below is a list of the films that have been submitted by Greenland for review by the academy for the award by year and the respective Academy Awards ceremony.

Year (Ceremony)	Film title used in nomination	Original title	Language(s)	Director	Result
2010 (83rd)	Nuummioq		Danish, Greenlandic	Torben Bech and Otto Rosing	Not nominated
2012 (85th)	Inuk		Greenlandic	Mike Magidson	Not nominated
2025 (98th)	Walls - Akinni Inuk		Greenlandic	Sofie Rørdam and Nina Paninnguaq Skydsbjerg	Not nominated

== See also ==
- List of Academy Award winners and nominees for Best International Feature Film
- List of Academy Award-winning foreign language films
- List of Danish submissions for the Academy Award for Best International Feature Film
