= List of Ethiopian submissions for the Academy Award for Best International Feature Film =

List of films

Best International Feature Film submissions from Ethiopia

Highlights
- Debut: 2010
- Submissions: 4
- Nominations: none
- Oscar winners: none

Ethiopia submitted a film for the Academy Award for Best International Feature Film (Note: The category was previously named the Academy Award for Best Foreign Language Film, but this was changed to the Academy Award for Best International Feature Film in April 2019, after the Academy deemed the word "Foreign" to be outdated.) for the first time in 2010. The award is handed out annually by the United States Academy of Motion Picture Arts and Sciences to a feature-length motion picture produced outside the United States that contains primarily non-English dialogue. It was not created until the 1956 Academy Awards, in which a competitive Academy Award of Merit, known as the Best Foreign Language Film Award, was created for non-English speaking films, and has been given annually since.

As of 2026, Ethiopia has submitted four films, but none of them were nominated.

== Submissions ==
The Academy of Motion Picture Arts and Sciences has invited the film industries of various countries to submit their best film for the Academy Award for Best International Feature Film since 1956. The International Feature Film Committee oversees the process and reviews all the submitted films. Following this, they vote via secret ballot to determine the five nominees for the award.

All the films are primary in Amharic. Below is a list of the films that have been submitted by Ethiopia for review by the Academy for the award by year and the respective Academy Awards ceremony.

Year (Ceremony)	Film title used in nomination	Original title	Language(s)	Director	Result
2010 (83rd)	The Athlete	እትሌቱ	Amharic	Davey Frankel and Rasselas Lakew	Not nominated
2014 (87th)	Difret	ድፍረት	Amharic	Zeresenay Berhane Mehari	Not nominated
2015 (88th)	Lamb		Amharic	Yared Zeleke	Not nominated
2019 (92nd)	Running Against the Wind	የነፋሱ ፍልሚያ	Amharic	Jan Philipp Weyl	Not nominated

== See also ==
- List of Academy Award winners and nominees for Best International Feature Film
- List of Academy Award-winning foreign language films
