= Lars Rosing =

Danish-Greenlandic actor (born 1972)

Lars Rosing (born 25 January 1972) is a Danish-Greenlandic actor. Brother of film director Otto Rosing. Born in Maniitsoq, a town in western Greenland, he grew up in Ilulissat, a larger town further north. Rosing later resided in Nuuk, the capital of Greenland.

== Career ==
Lars Rosing plays the protagonist Malik in Greenland's first international feature film Nuummioq. Lars Rosing lives near Montreal in Canada.
