= Angunnguaq Larsen =

Greenlandic actor

- Born: Nuuk, Greenland
- Occupations: Actor; musician

Angunnguaq Larsen is a Greenlandic actor and musician.

Larsen plays Mikael in Nuummioq, Greenland's first feature film. In 2018, he co-starred in Anori, a film based on Greenlandic myths. It was the first Greenlandic feature film by a female director.

In the 2010 Danish series Borgen, Larsen played the fictitious Prime Minister of Greenland Jens Enok Berthelsen. When a new series was announced in 2021, Larsen was again included in the cast.

Larsen appeared in 2018 Danish documentary Lykkelænder (The Raven and the Seagull).

Larsen plays the role of a local police chief, Enok Lynge, in the Swedish/Icelandic television series, Thin Ice. Vogue highlighted Larsen's role and described the series as maintaining "balance between earnest political messaging and escapist entertainment [that] is carefully maintained, and immensely satisfying". His performance earned him a male leading role nomination in Iceland's 2021 Edda Awards.

In addition to his acting, Larsen works as the sound technician for Katuaq, the cultural and performing arts centre in Greenland's capital, Nuuk.

Larsen is married with three daughters, and lives in Greenland.

== Filmography ==
Year	Title	Role	Notes
2009	Nuummioq	Mikael	
2009	Hinnarik Sinnattunilu		
2010	Eksperimentet	Vittus	
2010	Borgen	Jens Enok Berthelsen	TV series
2011	Qaqqat Alanngui	Anga Tuuma	
2018	Anori	Inuk	
2020	Thin Ice	Enok Lynge	TV series
2024	True Detective	Dominic Pitka	TV series Season 4
