= Nauja Lynge =

Greenlandic-Danish writer and rights activist

Nauja Lynge (born 21 January 1965) is a Greenlandic-Danish writer and lecturer. A graduate in languages from the Copenhagen Business School, she has specialized in storytelling since 1995. She is the chair of the Rigsfællesskabet Association which is devoted to maintaining relations between the Faroes, Greenland and Denmark.

After spending much of her life in Denmark, Lynge is reasserting her identity as a Danish Greenlander, actively assisting Greenlanders to gain the rights they deserve. Since 1995, Lynge has worked in storytelling, writing many articles and letters on the subject. In 2017, she published her first novel, Ivalu's Color and a short story, Welcome to My Dream.
