= Ole Jørgen Hammeken =

Greenlandic explorer(1956-2025)

- Born: 25 June 1956; Nuuk, Greenland, Kingdom of Denmark
- Died: 7 November 2025 (aged 69); New York City, New York, U.S.
- Citizenship: Greenlandic, Kingdom of Denmark
- Known for: Polar exploration and acting
- Children: 2
- Parent(s): Maritha and Motzflot Hammeken

Ole Jørgen Hammeken (25 June 1956 - 7 November 2025) was a Greenlandic explorer and actor based in Denmark and New York. He was born in Nuuk, the capital of Greenland, and was the son of Maritha and Motzflot Hammeken.

== Career ==
=== Polar exploration ===
He participated in 2007 in the 'Global Warming Dogsled Expedition' – a journey of over 500 km (310 mi) up and over the Greenland ice sheet from Uummannaq Fjord to Ilulissat, intended to draw people's attention to climate change and global warming.

In 2008, Hammeken completed a circumpolar voyage in a motorized open boat. In February 2009, Hammeken planned a centennial dog sled trip from northern Canada to the North Pole, 771 km (480 mi), one-way, minimum distance, retracing the footsteps of Robert Peary. He was a member of The Explorers Club.

=== Acting ===
In 2009 Hammeken played the lead role of Ikuma in Le Voyage D'Inuk, a French-Greenlandic film in the Greenlandic language. The film premiered on 20 April 2010 in Stockholm, Sweden.

== Personal life ==
In 1993, Hammeken returned from Denmark, having abandoned a judicial career, deciding to settle in Uummannaq. January 2013 Hammeken moved from Uummannaq.

It is important to have all these things right because we were colonized so long ago, we can't remember what we forgot.

— Hammeken commenting on the Danish-to-Greenlandic name changes in cartography

Hammeken was an advocate of traditional Greenlandic arts, preservation of dogsledding and historical hunting techniques.

Hammeken died on 7 November 2025 following a cancer diagnosis.

He had two children, a daughter named Alexandra Pipaluk Hammeken, and a son named Ludvig Hammeken.

== Filmography ==
Year	Title	Role	Notes
2010	Inuk	Actor	Award Best Film at the 2012 Byron Bay International Film Festival
