= Johannes Madsen =

Danish footballer (born 1993)

Personal information
- Full name: Johannes Madsen
- Date of birth: 7 April 1993 (age 33)
- Place of birth: Denmark
- Height: 1.80 m (5 ft 11 in)
- Position: Left winger

Youth career
- –2013: FC Midtjylland

Senior career*
Years	Team	Apps	(Gls)
2013–2014	FC Midtjylland	1	(0)
2014	→ Vejle BK (loan)	7	(0)
2014–2017	Fremad Amager		
- * Club domestic league appearances and goals as of 26 February 2015

Johannes Madsen is a Danish footballer who last played as a left winger for Fremad Amager in the Danish 1st Division.
