= Field dressing (hunting) =

Removal of the internal organs of hunted game

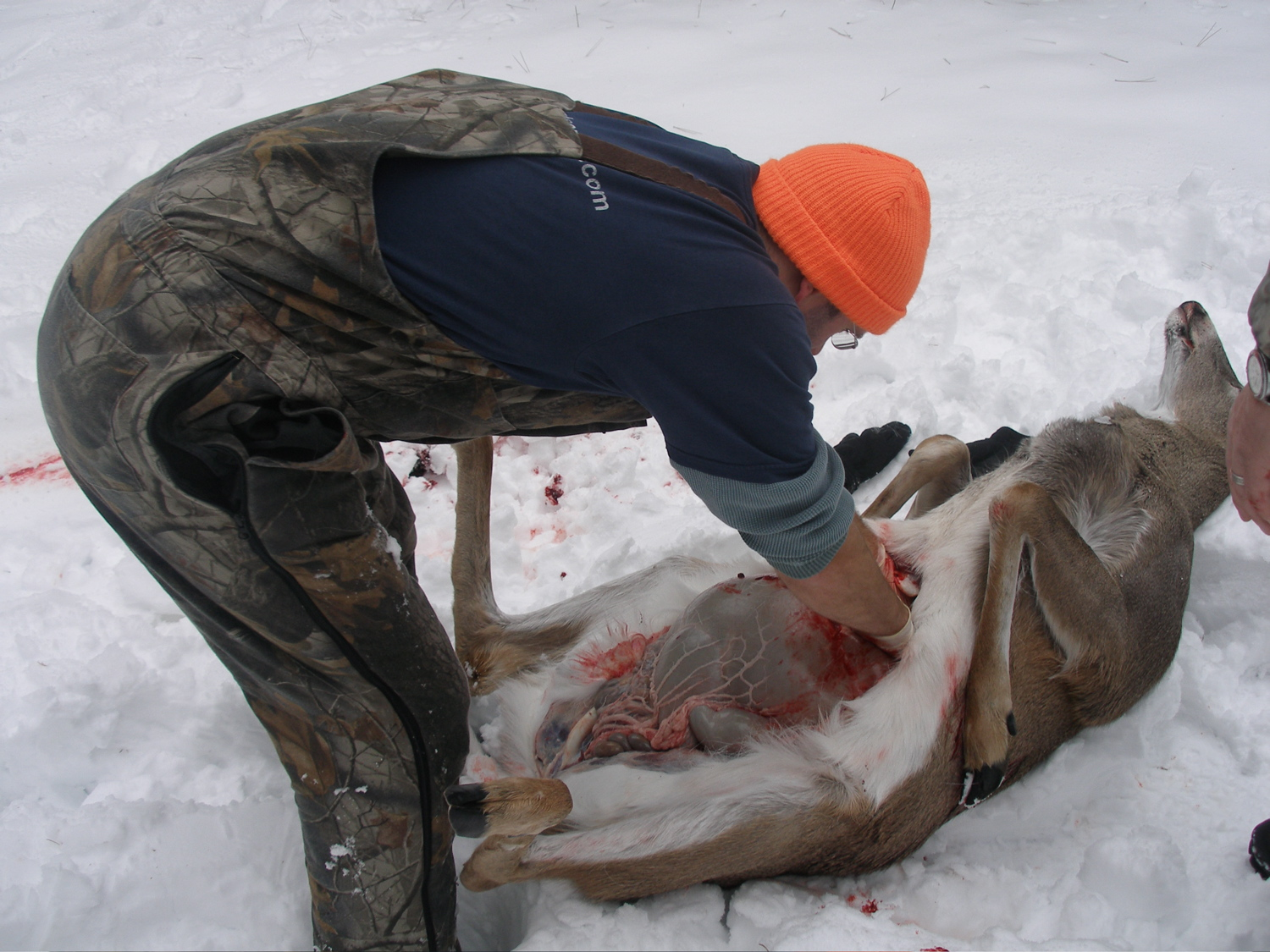
Hunter in the US field-dressing a deer

Field dressing, also known as gralloching (/ˈɡræləkɪŋ/ GRA-lə-king), is the process of removing the internal organs of hunted game, and is a necessary step in obtaining and preserving meat from wild animals such as deer. Field dressing is often done as soon as possible after the animal is killed to ensure rapid body heat loss, which prevents bacteria from growing on the surface of the carcass. Field dressing also aids hunters in transporting hunted game by lightening the weight of the carcass.

== Tools ==
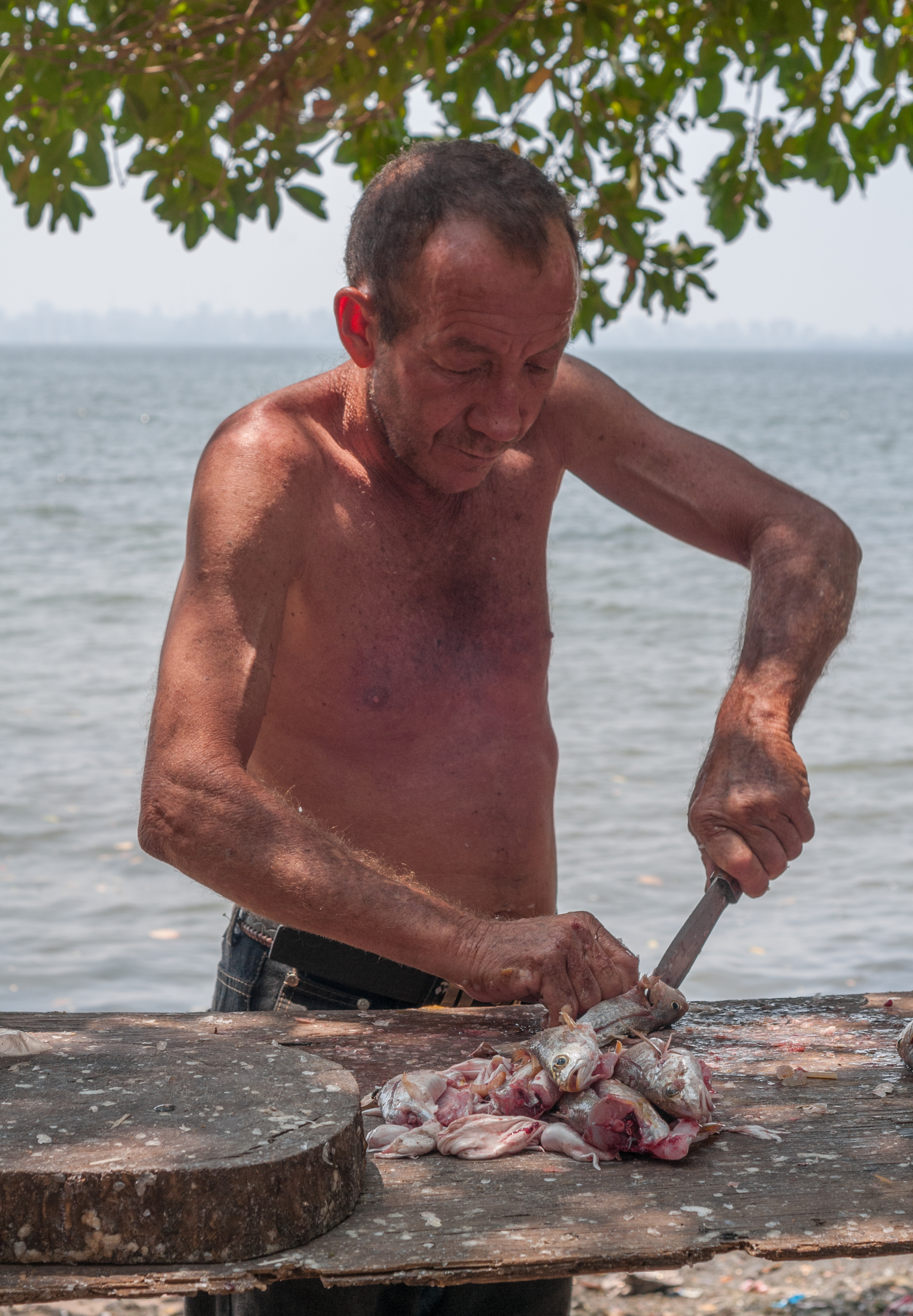
Fisherman field dressing fish in Venezuela

Most hunters use a sharp knife for field dressing. Other tools can be used such as axes or saws. However, the fact that harvesting locations are generally in remote areas makes the transporting and use of larger tools impractical.

Using a knife specifically designed for field dressing and the use of surgical gloves can greatly aid in sanitation.

== Risk of disease ==
Chronic wasting disease (CWD) is a neurological disease and has been found in a growing percentage of deer and elk in certain geographical areas in Canada and the United States. There have been reports in the popular press of humans being affected by CWD, and a study by the Centers for Disease Control and Prevention (CDC) said that "more epidemiologic and laboratory studies are needed to monitor the possibility of such transmissions."

The epidemiological study said that "[a]s a precaution, hunters should avoid eating deer and elk tissues known to harbor the CWD agent (including the brain, spinal cord, eyes, spleen, tonsils, lymph nodes) from areas where CWD has been identified."

== See also ==
- Dressed weight
