= Inuk (film) =

- Directed by: Mike Magidson
- Written by: Mike Magidson; Jean-Michel Huctin
- Produced by: Ann Andreasen; Mike Magidson; Marc Buriot; Sylvie Barbe
- Starring: Ole Jørgen Hammeken; Gaaba Petersen; Rebekka Jørgensen; Sara Lyberth; Inunnguaq Jeremiassen; Elisabeth Skade
- Edited by: Cecile Coolen
- Music by: Justin La Vallee; Karina Moller; Robert Peary HIVSHU
- Release dates: October 2, 2010 (Woodstock Film Festival); May 11, 2012 (Greenland)
- Running time: 90 minutes
- Countries: Greenland; France
- Language: Greenlandic

Inuk (previously titled Le Voyage d'Inuk) is a Greenlandic-language film directed by Mike Magidson and co-written by Magidson, Ole Jørgen Hammeken and anthropologist Jean-Michel Huctin. It is Magidson's first feature film. It screened in Stockholm film Festival on 20 April 2010 in an unfinished version and made its official theatrical release in Greenland on 11 May 2012. The film was selected as the Greenlandic entry for the Best Foreign Language Oscar at the 85th Academy Awards, but it did not make the final shortlist. The film won the Award Best Film at the 2012 Byron Bay International Film Festival.

== Background ==
The "Children's Home Uummannaq" is situated 500 km north of the Arctic Circle in the small town of Uummannaq and was the source of inspiration of the two writers. The film is co-produced by Ann Andreassen, who also plays a role in the film. Anderassen has assisted with many foreign documentaries shot in Greenland. Mike Magidson had previously made two documentary movies in Greenland with her help before he and co-author Jean-Michel Huctin decided to make a feature film. They began shooting in April 2008 in Uummannaq Bay and in Nuuk and finished in November.

== Plot ==
Inuk covers a journey from Greenland's south to its north as an homage to the origins of the Inuit. It is the coming-of-age story of 16-year-old Inuk, who was raised in the south in Greenland's capital Nuuk, and who is torn between the violence of his alcoholic parents and his dreams of creating an Inuit rock band. He is sent to a foster home in the north, where his foster guardian and teacher, Aviaaja sends him to the bear hunter Ikuma so that he may learn wisdom. But Ikuma had begun to doubt himself after his own world began to decline due to the effects of global warming. This begins Inuk's difficult initiation into manhood through a journey by dogsled where the seal hunt replaces video games. On his journey he meets and is attracted to the rebellious Naja. He finally reconciles his life, but in doing so re-awakens the old injury that had affected the life of Ikuma.

== Cast ==
- Gaaba Petersen as Inuk
- Ole Jørgen Hammeken as Ikuma
- Rebekka Jørgensen as Aviaaja
- Sara Lyberth as Naja
- Inunnguaq Jeremiassen as Minik
- Elisabeth Skade as Inuk's Mother

== Release ==
A preliminary screening was at salon du cinema de Paris 2009 while the film was still being edited. The French film team was there to speak about the difficulties of shooting in polar conditions with non-professional actors and a small crew. One of the main actors of the movie, Ole Jørgen Hammeken arrived in France in time to view the screening and speak.

The Official Theatrical release was done on the 11 May 2012 in Nuuk Greenland with all the Greenlandic officials where invited by Børnehjemmet UPI the Greenlandic producer of the film.

== See also ==
- List of submissions to the 85th Academy Awards for Best Foreign Language Film
- List of Greenlandic submissions for the Academy Award for Best Foreign Language Film
