= Henriette Rasmussen =

Greenlandic activist and politician (1950-2017)

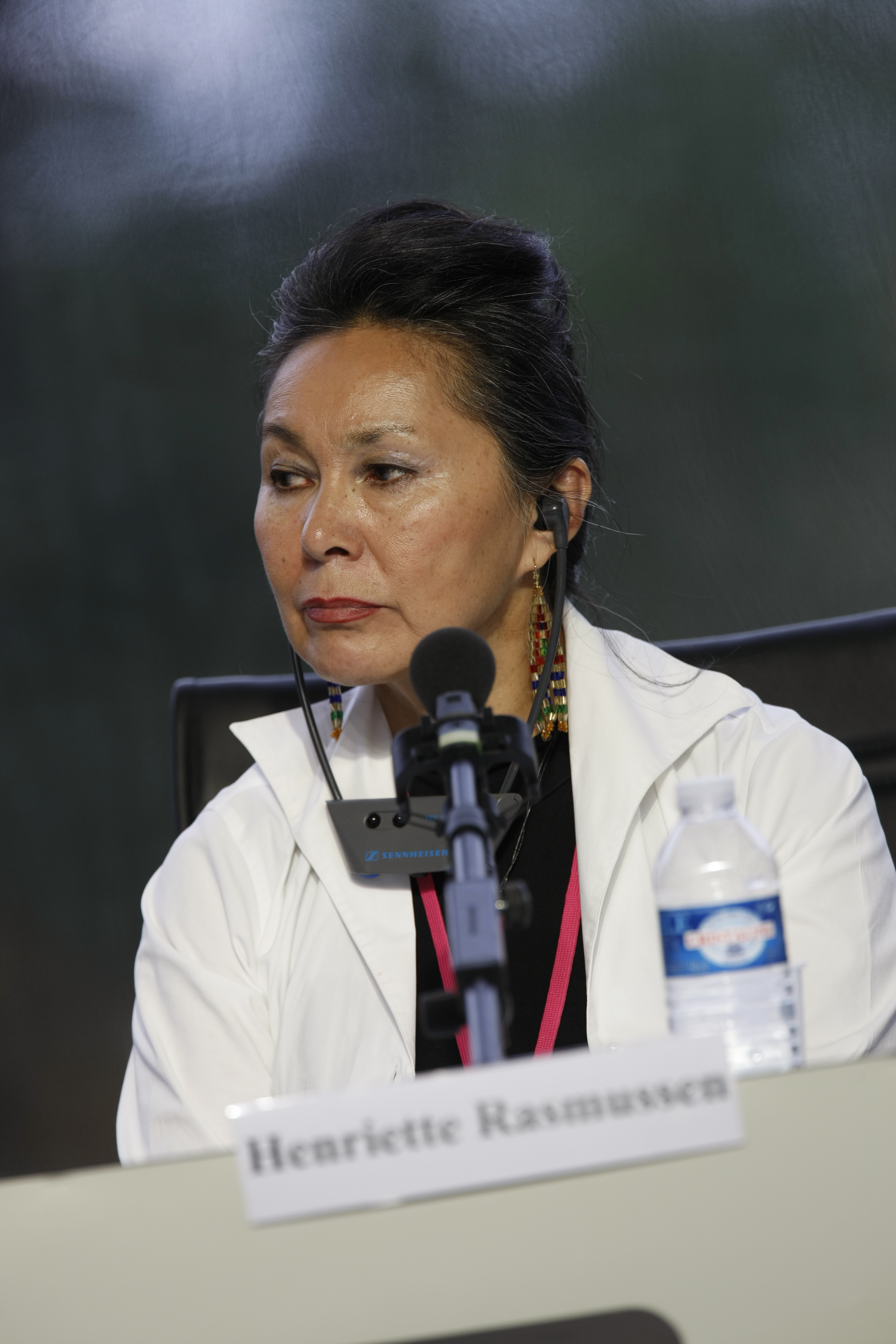
- Henriette Rasmussen (2009)
- Born: June 8, 1950; Qasigiannguit, Greenland
- Died: March 3, 2017 (aged 66); Nuuk, Greenland

Henriette Ellen Kathrine Vilhelmine Rasmussen née Jeremiassen (8 June 1950 – 2017) was a Greenlandic educator, journalist, women's rights activist and politician. In 1992, she provided support for the adoption of the UN Convention on the Rights of the Child and in 1996, was appointed principal advisor to the ILO in connection with the 1989 Indigenous and Tribal Peoples Convention. As a member of Inuit Ataqatigiit from the early 1980s, she strove for Greenlandic independence from Denmark and served as Greenland's Minister of Culture and Education (2003–2005).

== Early life ==
Born in Qasigiannguit in western Greenland on 8 June 1950, Henriette Ellen Kathrine Vilhelmine Jeremiassen was the daughter of Jens Emil Axel Jeremiassen (1919–93), a skipper, and Birthe Marie Margrethe Møller (born 1924), a factory worker. The eldest daughter in a family of eight children, she was brought up to recognize the equality of the sexes and to appreciate the importance of education. As a teenager, she spent a year in Denmark before completing her high-school education in Nuuk, matriculating in 1970. In 1975, she qualified as a teacher from N. Zahle's School in Copenhagen. During her studies, she became interested in the new women's movement, making it known in the sidelines of the Arctic Peoples Conference in 1973 that she regretted the poor representation of women.

== Career ==
From 1975, she taught at the folk high school in Sisimiut where she developed an interest in left-wing politics and became the driving force behind the new women's movement in Greenland, including the red stocking movement KILUT.

After an unsuccessful marriage in 1969 with Scott Lundby Rasmussen from Roskilde which was dissolved in 1971, she established a partnership with the Greenlandic linguist Carl Christian Jonas Olsen (born 1943) with whom she had two children: Inuk Poul (1976) and Nunni Navaranaaq (1979). Together with Olsen, she spent a year in Utqiagvik, Alaska, where she taught Greenlandic language, literature and culture. While doing this, the couple were also active in the 1977 Inuit Circumpolar Conference with participants from Siberia, Alaska, Canada and Greenland, Rasmussen acting as interpreter.

From 1979 to 1982, Rasmussen worked in the cultural section of Greenland's radio KNR. After training as a journalist, she then headed the school radio and video department until 1991. During this period, she was increasingly active in politics as a member of Inuit Atagatigiit, succeeding in being elected as the first female member of Nuuk's municipal council in 1983. Showing a strong stand for Greenlandic independence, she was able to have three additional IA candidates elected in the municipal elections in 1989. From 1984 to 1995, she was also a member of Greenland's parliament where she dealt with culture, environment and foreign affairs. In the coalition with Siumut from 1991 to 1995, she was Minister for Social Affairs and the Labour Market.

Rasmussen became actively involved in promoting the UN Convention on the Rights of the Child which was adopted in Greenland in 1992. She was invited to represent Denmark at the UN World Conference on Human Rights in 1993 which was the International Year for the World's Indigenous People. Her proposal for a permanent UN forum for indigenous peoples was accepted in 1996. As a result, she was appointed Chief Technical Advisor on Indigenous People at the ILO, Geneva, where she served until 2000. She also contributed to the UNESCO World Culture Report (1998) and became a member of the Earth Charter Commission where she was involved in drafting a global environmental charter and promoting it in Greenland and through the Inuit Circumpolar Conference.

In 2002, Rasmussen returned to Greenlandic politics, becoming Minister of Culture and Education from 2003 to 2005. She then returned to journalism, becoming a familiar voice on KNR until poor health forced her to retire. She had also served as French consul in Nuuk.

After a lengthy illness, Henriette Rasmussen died in Nuuk on 3 March 2017. She is survived by her husband, two children and two grandchildren.

== Selected publications ==
Among Rasmussen's publications are the following:

- Kalaallit arfanniartarnerat pillugu, tuluttut, Booklet 6 articles about whaling in Greenland, 1986 (in Greenlandic and English)
- UNESCO : First World Culture Report 1998, with Inger Sjørslev, Københavns Universitet, Article about Greenlandic writing system and media history (in English)
- Manual to the ILO Convention No. 169, 2000, English editor
- Traditional Occupations of Indigenous Peoples, Emerging Trends, 2000
- Workload of an Indigenous Samburu Woman, 1999, Video
- The Earth Charter, 2000 (contributor)
- Towards a Sustainable World, The Earth Charter in Action, article 2005
- Grønland I Verdenssamfundet, 2006, article : Fra forskning I Grønland til grønlandsk forskning, on scientific research in Greenland (in Danish)
- INUIT, ICC-p aviisia, aaqqissuisutut, blad redaktion 2006 (in Greenlandic and Danish)
- Rethinking Nordic Colonialism – INUIT the demand for Cultural Space, 2006
- Oqaatsip Kimia, the Power of the Word, case study, to the ILO, 2007
- Angutit Iloqqasut / A Circle of Men, radio feature, 2009
- Making the Declaration Work, IWGIA, article, 2010
