= Otto Rosing =

Danish film director

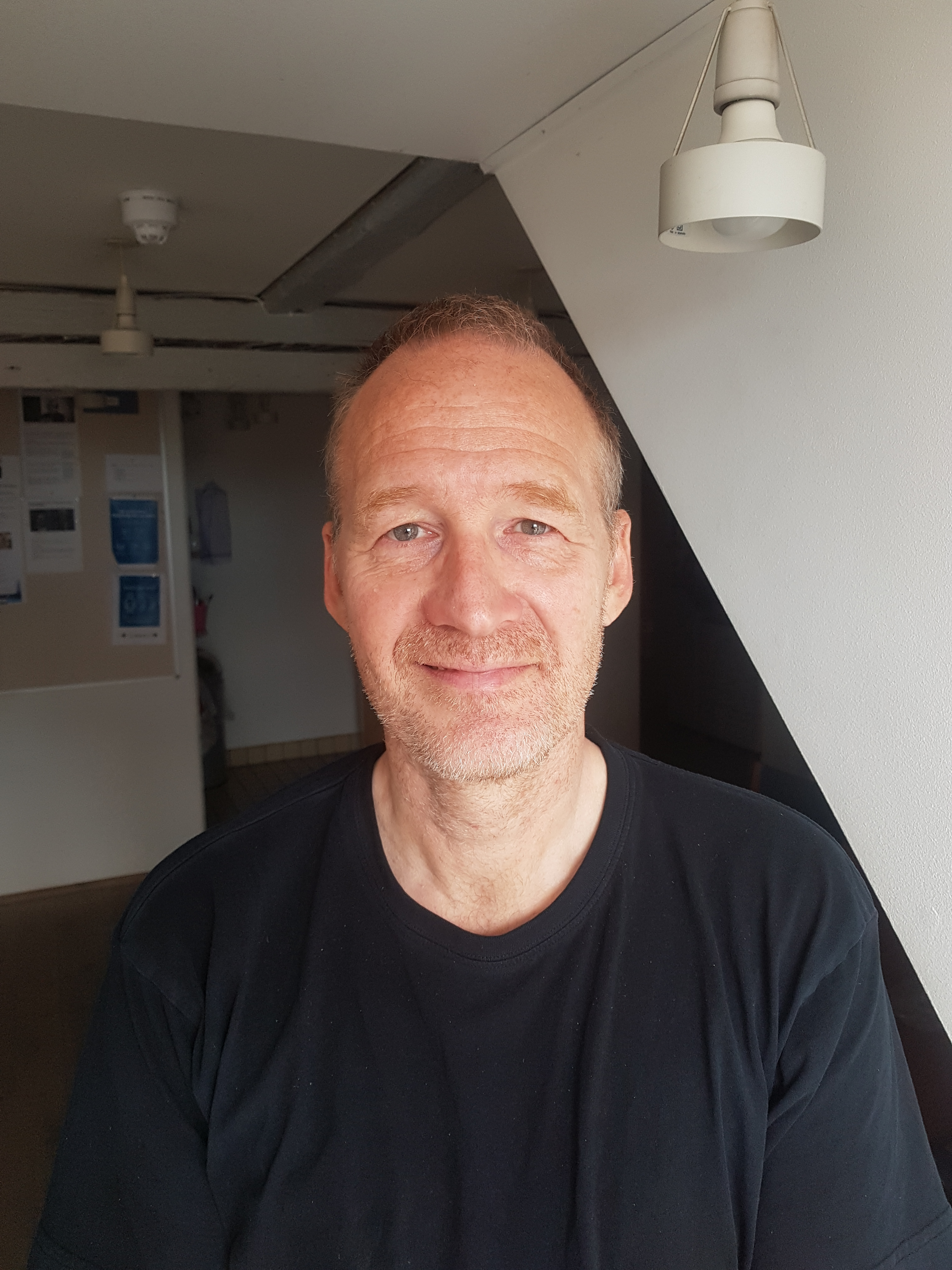
Otto Rosing

Otto Rosing (born 9 March 1967) is a Greenlandic/Danish film director. He grew up in Ilulissat, Greenland, and later resided in Greenland's capital Nuuk. He now lives and works in Copenhagen, Denmark. In collaboration with film producer Mikisoq H. Lynge, Otto Rosing and Torben Bech directed Greenland's first international feature film Nuummioq. It was the first Greenlandic film to be submitted for the Academy Award for Best Foreign Language Film, but it didn't make the final shortlist.

Otto Rosing's youngest brother Lars Rosing plays the protagonist Malik in Nuummioq. Otto Rosing has also directed the documentary The Eternal flight a portrait of the artist Jens Rosing.
