= Greenlanders =

Nationals of Greenland

- Flag of Greenland

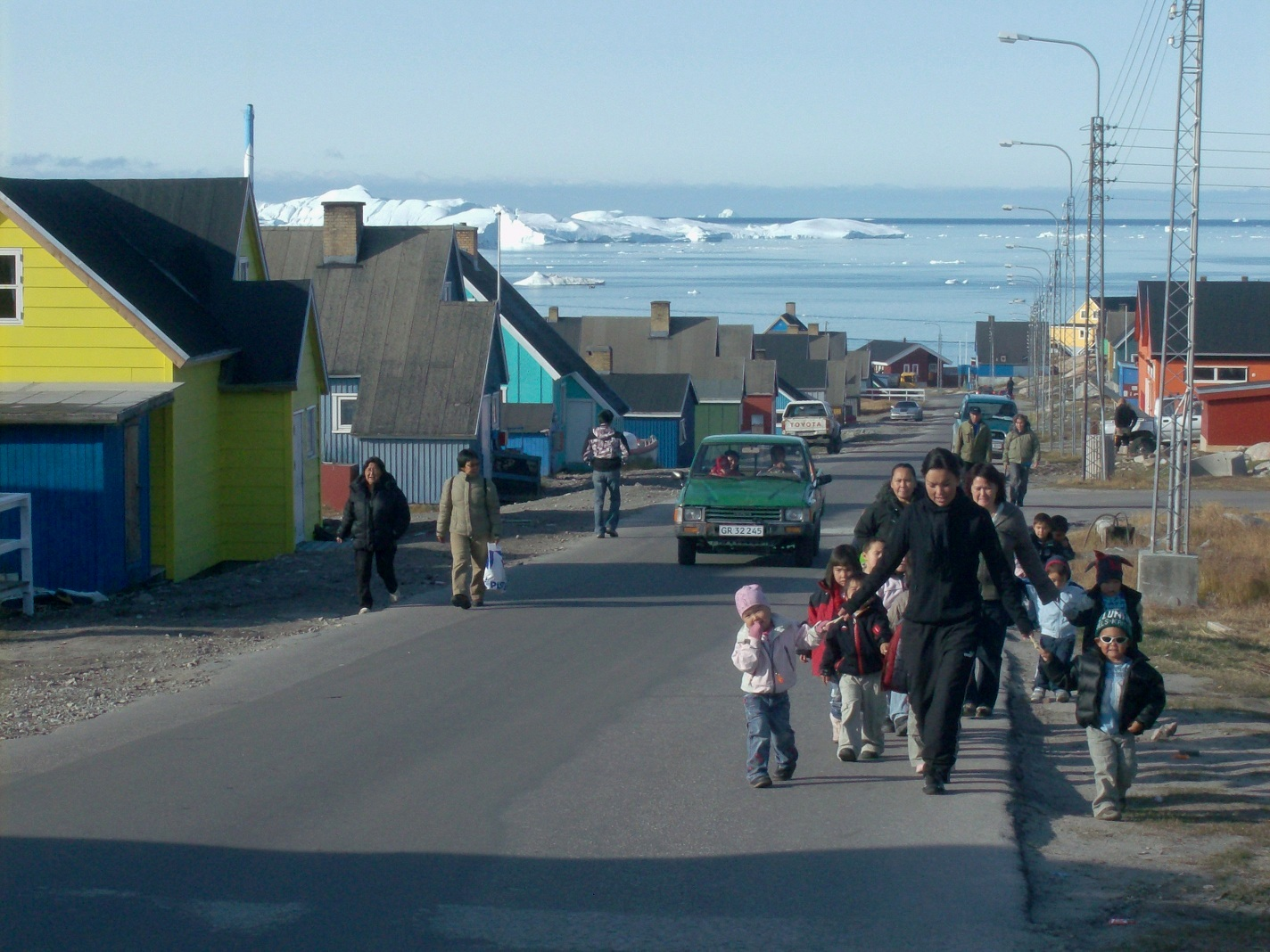
- Schoolchildren walk with their teacher in Ilulissat, Greenland, with icebergs from the Ilulissat Icefjord visible in the background.

Total population
- ▼c. 56,583 (2022 estimate)

Regions with significant populations
- Greenlandic diaspora: c. 19,505
- Greenland: 56,583
- Denmark: 18,563
- United States: 352
- Norway: 293
- Faroe Islands: 163
- Iceland: 65
- United Kingdom: 60
- Canada: 55
- Netherlands: 14

Languages
- Greenlandic, Danish, English

Religion
- Lutheranism (Church of Greenland); See Religion in Greenland

Greenlanders (Greenlandic: Kalaallit, Danish: Grønlændere), also called Greenlandics or Greenlandic people, are the people of Greenland. Most speak Greenlandic, an Eskaleut language. Greenlandic Inuit make up 85–90% of the people of Greenland.

Greenland is an autonomous territory within the Danish Realm, and its citizens hold Danish nationality. In 986, Erik the Red led Norse settlers to Greenland's southwest coast, where they coexisted with indigenous cultures. Greenland came under Norwegian rule in 1261 and later became part of the Kalmar Union in 1397. From the 16th to 18th centuries, European expeditions led by Portugal, Denmark–Norway, and missionaries like Hans Egede, sought Greenland for trade, sovereignty, and the rediscovery of lost Norse settlements, ultimately leading to colonization by Denmark.

== Identity ==
Greenlanders possess Danish nationality. The Danish Realm, including Greenland, joined the European Communities, the predecessor to the European Union, in 1973. However, after gaining home rule in 1979, Greenland held a referendum in 1982 in which the majority voted to leave the Communities. As a result, Greenland officially withdrew from the European Communities in 1985. Although Greenland is no longer part of the European Union, it maintains a special relationship through its status as an Overseas Country and Territory. As Danish citizens, Greenlanders have the same rights to freedom of movement within the EU; this allows them to live and work freely in member states.

== History ==
=== Early Paleo-Inuit cultures ===
In prehistoric times, Greenland was inhabited by several Paleo-Inuit cultures, identified primarily through archaeological discoveries. The first known entry of the Paleo-Inuit into Greenland occurred around 2500 BC. From 2500 BC to 800 BC, the Saqqaq culture thrived in southern and western Greenland, with most remains found near Disko Bay.

Simultaneously, the Independence I culture existed in northern Greenland from 2400 BC to 1300 BC as part of the Arctic small tool tradition, with settlements such as Deltaterrasserne emerging. Around 800 BC, the Saqqaq culture disappeared, and the Early Dorset culture emerged in western Greenland and the Independence II culture in the north. The Dorset culture, the first to spread across Greenland's coastal regions in both the east and west, lasted until the Thule culture's dominance by AD 1500. Dorset communities primarily relied on hunting whales and reindeer for sustenance.

=== Norse settlements ===
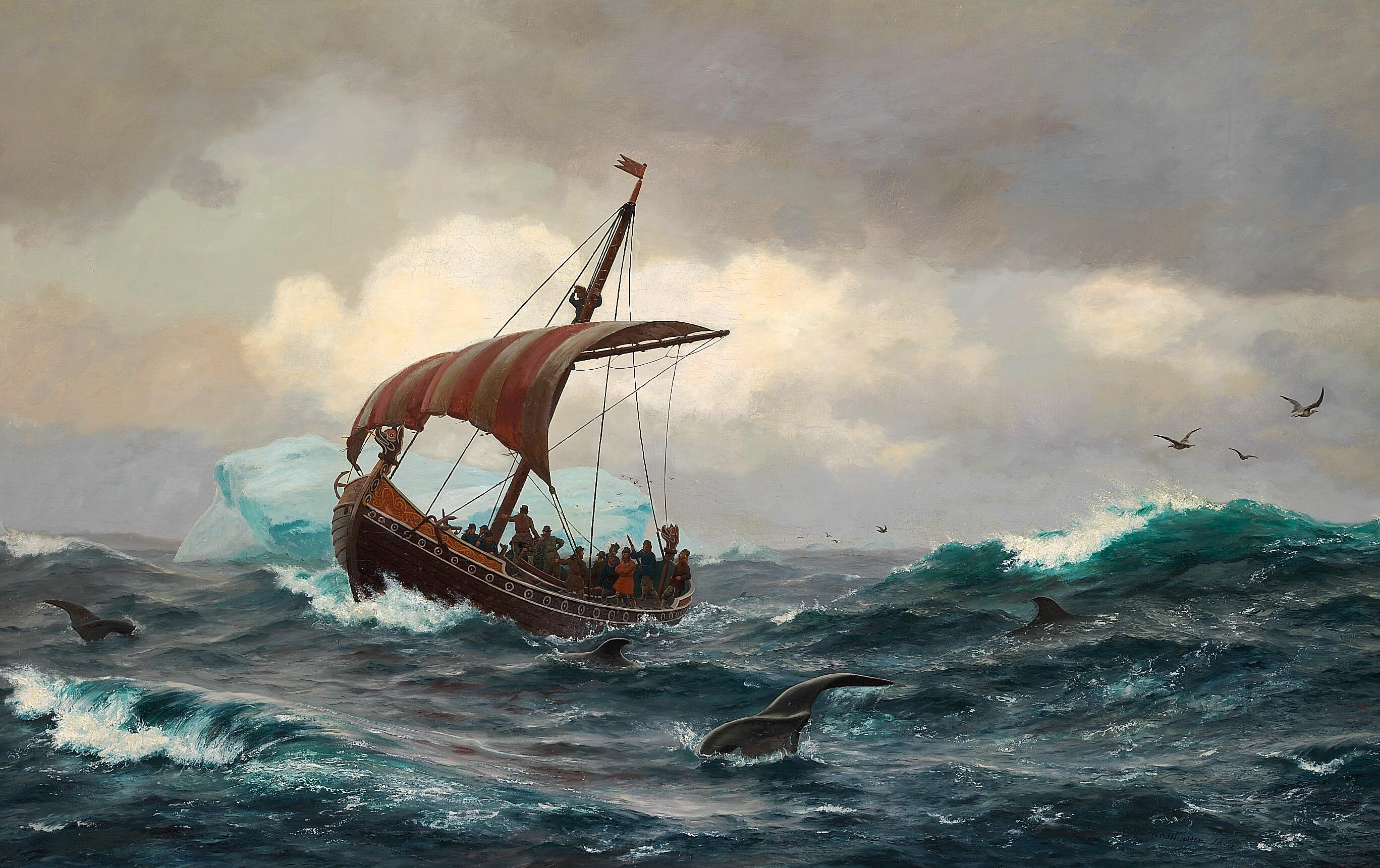
Summer Night off the Greenland Coast, Around the Year 1000, by Carl Rasmussen, 1875

In 986, Icelanders and Norwegians, led by Erik the Red with 14 boats, established settlements along Greenland's west coast. These settlements, the Eastern, Western, and Middle Settlements, were located on fjords near the island's southwestern tip. At the time, the Norse settlers shared Greenland with the late Dorset culture in the northern and western regions and later with the Thule culture, which migrated from the north. In 1261, Norse Greenlanders came under Norwegian rule as part of the Kingdom of Norway. Norway entered a personal union with Denmark in 1380, and Greenland subsequently became part of the Kalmar Union in 1397.

The Norse settlements, including Brattahlíð, thrived for several centuries before disappearing in the 15th century, possibly due to the onset of the Little Ice Age. Aside from a few runic inscriptions, the only surviving contemporary records of the Norse settlements are accounts of their contact with Iceland and Norway. Medieval Norwegian sagas and historical texts document aspects of Greenland's economy, the bishops of Garðar, and the collection of tithes. Additionally, the Konungs skuggsjá (Old Norse: "King's mirror") contains a chapter describing Norse Greenland's exports, imports, and attempts at grain cultivation.

Icelandic sagas about life in Greenland were written in the 13th century or later and are not considered primary sources for early Norse Greenland; however, they are closer to primary sources for later Norse Greenland. Modern understanding of Norse Greenland relies primarily on archaeological evidence. Ice-core and clam-shell data suggest that between AD 800 and 1300, southern Greenland's fjord regions experienced a relatively mild climate, several degrees warmer than usual for the North Atlantic. This allowed for the growth of trees and herbaceous plants, livestock farming, and barley cultivation near the 70th parallel. Ice cores also reveal that Greenland has undergone significant temperature fluctuations over the past 100,000 years. The Icelandic Book of Settlements also records harsh winters, with famines reportedly leading to the killing of "the old and helpless" which "were killed and thrown over cliffs".

The Norse settlements in Greenland disappeared during the 14th and early 15th centuries. The decline of the Western Settlement coincided with a significant drop in both summer and winter temperatures. Research on North Atlantic temperature variability during the Little Ice Age indicates that maximum summer temperatures began to decrease around the early 14th century, dropping by as much as 6 to 8 °C (11 to 14 °F) below modern summer averages. Additionally, the coldest winter temperatures in 2,000 years occurred during the late 14th and early 15th centuries. The Eastern Settlement is believed to have been abandoned in the early to mid-15th century, likely as a result of these harsh climatic conditions.

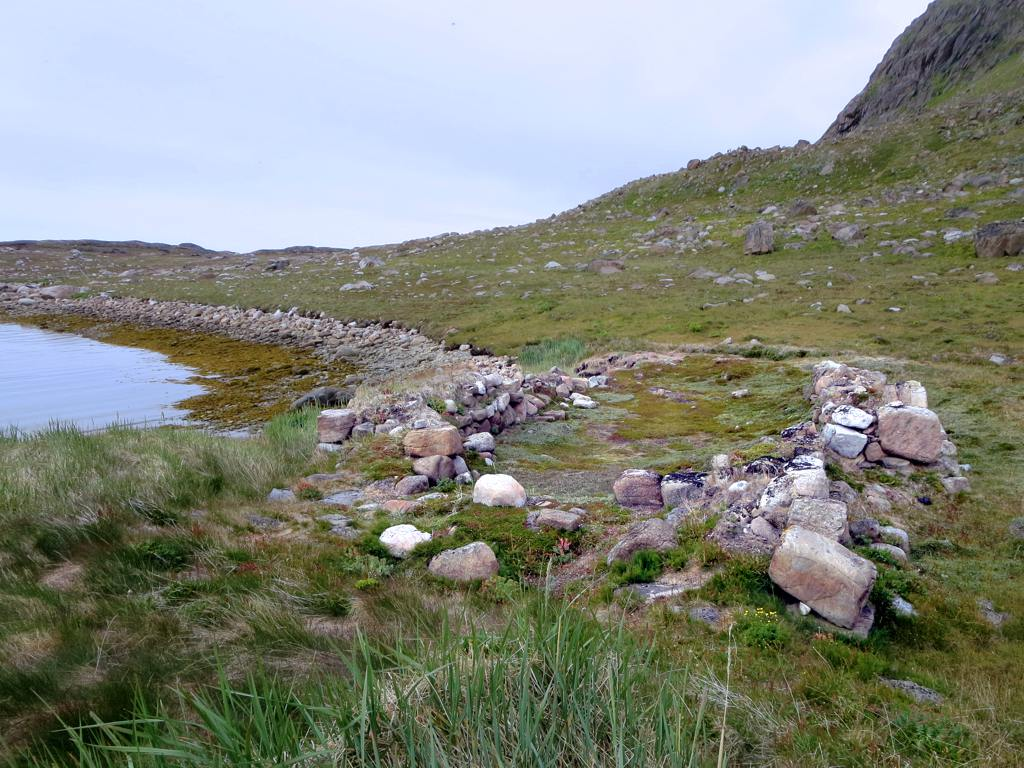
Ruins of the Herjolfsnes church

Archaeological excavations at Herjolfsnes in the 1920s revealed evidence suggesting that the Norse population in Greenland may have experienced malnutrition. This could have been caused by soil erosion, linked to the Norsemen's farming practices, turf-cutting, and deforestation, as well as a decline in temperatures during the Little Ice Age, the impact of pandemic plagues, or conflicts with the Skrælings (a Norse term for the Inuit, meaning "wretches"). However, more recent archaeological studies question the extent of the Norse colonization's environmental damage, suggesting traces of soil improvement strategies. It is now believed that the settlements, never exceeding about 2,500 people, were gradually abandoned in the 15th century, partly due to the declining value of walrus ivory, once a key export, amid competition from higher-quality sources. Evidence of widespread starvation or severe hardship remains limited.

=== Thule culture (1300–present) ===
The Thule people are the ancestors of the modern Greenlandic population, with no genetic links to the Paleo-Inuit found in the current population. The Thule culture migrated eastward from present-day Alaska around 1000 AD, reaching Greenland by approximately 1300. They introduced significant technological advancements to the region, including dog sleds and toggling harpoons.

There is an Inuit account of contact and conflict with the Norse settlers, republished in The Norse Atlantic Sagas by Gwyn Jones. Jones notes a possible Norse account of the same event, though its authenticity is considered more uncertain.

=== 1500–1814 ===
In 1500, King Manuel I of Portugal dispatched Gaspar Corte-Real to Greenland to search for a Northwest Passage to Asia, as the Treaty of Tordesillas placed Greenland within Portugal's sphere of influence. In 1501, Gaspar returned with his brother Miguel Corte-Real, but frozen seas forced them southward to Labrador and Newfoundland. Their cartographic findings contributed to the Cantino planisphere, created in Lisbon in 1502, which accurately depicted Greenland's southern coastline.

From 1605 to 1607, King Christian IV of Denmark and Norway organized expeditions to reestablish contact with Greenland's lost Norse settlements and affirm sovereignty over the island. Despite the efforts, including the participation of English explorer James Hall as pilot, these missions were largely unsuccessful due to harsh Arctic conditions and the near-inaccessibility of Greenland's east coast, where they mistakenly searched.

After the disappearance of the Norse settlements, Inuit groups controlled Greenland. However, Denmark-Norway maintained its claims, rooted in Norse history. In 1721, missionary Hans Egede led a joint mercantile and religious expedition to Greenland, seeking to reestablish contact with any remaining Norse descendants. Though no Norse communities remained, this mission marked the beginning of Denmark's colonization of the Americas. The colony, centered at Godthåb (modern Nuuk), restricted trade to Danish merchants and excluded foreign influence. Egede eventually returned to Denmark, leaving his son Paul Egede to continue the mission.

=== Treaty of Kiel to World War II (1814–1945) ===
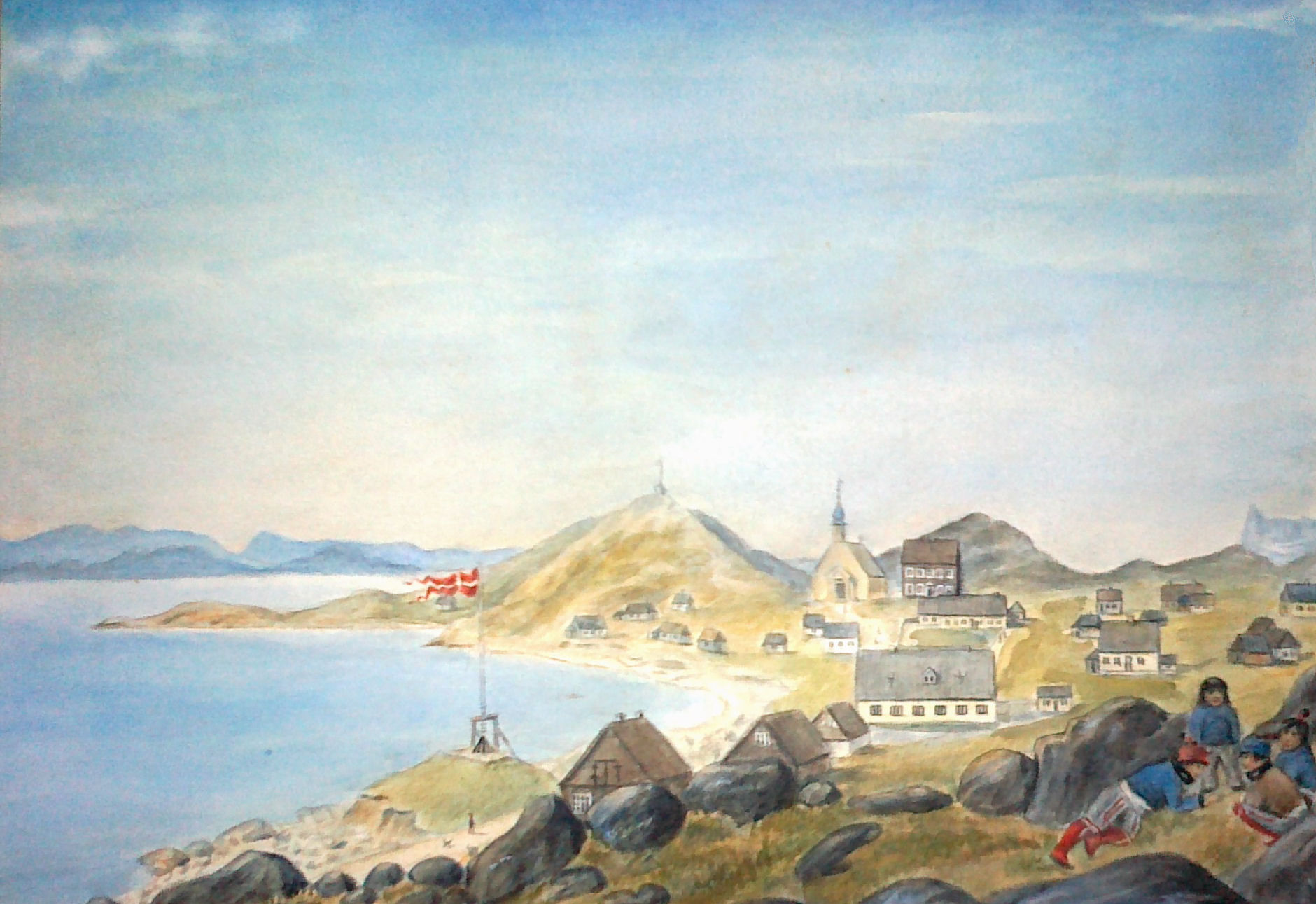
Godthåb in Greenland, c. 1878

When the union between the crowns of Denmark and Norway dissolved in 1814, the Treaty of Kiel assigned Norway's former colonies, including Greenland, to the Danish monarch. In July 1931, Norway occupied the then-uninhabited eastern Greenland, naming it Erik the Red's Land, on the basis that it was terra nullius. The dispute between Norway and Denmark was brought before the Permanent Court of International Justice in 1933, which ruled in favor of Denmark.

Greenland's connection to Denmark was disrupted on 9 April 1940, during World War II, when Denmark was occupied by Nazi Germany. On 8 April 1941, the United States occupied Greenland to protect it from potential German invasion. The U.S. occupation lasted until the end of the war in 1945. During this time, Greenland traded cryolite from the Ivittuut mine to acquire goods from the U.S. and Canada. The U.S. military used Bluie as a codename for Greenland, establishing several bases, including Bluie West-1 at Narsarsuaq and Bluie West-8 at Kangerlussuaq, which remain major international airports today.

During the war, Greenland's governance changed. Governor Eske Brun assumed control under a 1925 Danish law allowing governors to act independently in extreme circumstances. Meanwhile, Governor Aksel Svane relocated to the U.S. to oversee Greenland's supply commission. The Danish Sirius Patrol guarded northeastern Greenland, using dog sleds to detect German weather stations, which were subsequently destroyed by American forces. After Nazi Germany's collapse, Albert Speer briefly considered escaping to Greenland but ultimately surrendered to the United States Armed Forces.

Before 1940, Greenland was a protected and isolated society under Denmark's trade monopoly, allowing limited barter trade with British whalers. Wartime experiences fostered a sense of self-reliance, as Greenland managed its own governance and external communication. In 1946, the highest Greenlandic council, the Landsrådene, recommended gradual reform rather than radical changes. A commission initiated in 1948 presented its findings in 1950 (known as G-50), advocating for the development of a modern welfare state, modeled on Denmark's example with Danish support. In 1953, Greenland became an integral part of the Danish Kingdom, and in 1979, it was granted home rule.

=== Home rule (1945–present) ===
The American presence in Greenland introduced Sears catalogs, enabling Greenlanders and Danes to purchase modern home appliances and other goods by mail. From 1948 to 1950, the Greenland Commission assessed the island's conditions, focusing on its isolation, unequal laws, and economic stagnation. This evaluation led to the abolition of the Royal Greenland Trading Department's monopolies. In 1953, Greenland's status shifted from a colony to an autonomous province within the Danish Realm. Greenland also gained its own Danish county and, despite its small population, was granted representation in the Danish Folketing (parliament).

Denmark implemented reforms to urbanize Greenlanders, aiming to reduce dependence on declining seal populations and to provide labor for expanding cod fisheries. These reforms also sought to improve healthcare, education, and transportation. However, they introduced challenges such as modern unemployment and poorly planned housing projects, notably Blok P. These European-style apartments proved impractical, with Inuit struggling to navigate narrow doors in winter clothing, and fire escapes often blocked by fishing equipment. Television broadcasts began in 1982, but economic hardships worsened after the collapse of cod fisheries and mines in the late 1980s and early 1990s, leaving Greenland reliant on Danish aid and shrimp exports.

State-owned enterprises remain central to the economy. Subsidized companies like Air Greenland and the Arctic Umiaq ferry are essential for connecting remote communities. The primary airport is still the former U.S. air base at Kangerlussuaq, as Nuuk's airport cannot accommodate international flights due to cost and noise limitations.

Greenland's limited representation in the Folketing meant that despite 70.3% of its population opposing entry into the European Economic Community, it was included along with Denmark in 1973. Concerns about the customs union enabling foreign competition and overfishing of Greenlandic waters were soon validated. The Folketing approved devolution in 1978, and home rule was established under a local Landsting the following year. On 23 February 1982, a slim majority (53%) of Greenlanders voted to withdraw from the EEC, a process finalized in 1985 with the Greenland Treaty.

Greenland's Home Rule has increasingly embraced Greenlandic identity, with a focus on Kalaallit language and culture, while distancing itself from Danish influence and regional dialects. In 1979, the capital, Godthåb, was renamed Nuuk. A local flag was introduced in 1985, and the Danish-owned KGH was replaced by the locally managed Kalaallit Niuerfiat, now known as KNI A/S, in 1986. Following a successful referendum on self-government in 2008, Greenland's parliament gained expanded powers, and in 2009, Danish was removed as an official language.

Greenland's international relations are mostly managed by its home rule government, though some matters remain under Danish oversight. As part of the agreement when Greenland exited the EEC, it was considered a "special case," retaining access to the European market through Denmark, which remains a member. Greenland is also involved in several regional organizations with Iceland, the Faroe Islands, and Indigenous Inuit populations from Canada and Russia. It was a founding member of the Arctic Council in 1996, an environmental group. The presence of U.S. military bases, particularly the Pituffik Space Base, continues to be a contentious issue, with some politicians advocating for a renegotiation of the 1951 US–Denmark treaty. The 1999–2003 Commission on Self-Governance even proposed that Greenland should seek to have the base removed from U.S. control and placed under international management, possibly through the United Nations.

In 2025, U.S. President Donald Trump expressed interest in "purchasing Greenland," prompting criticism from Greenlandic officials and citizens. In interviews aired by Kalaallit Nunaata Radioa (KNR), some residents expressed concerns about cultural preservation and economic dependency. Greenland's leaders have also expressed criticism over an upcoming visit by a prominent American delegation, which Trump has previously suggested might be a candidate for annexation.

== Demographics ==
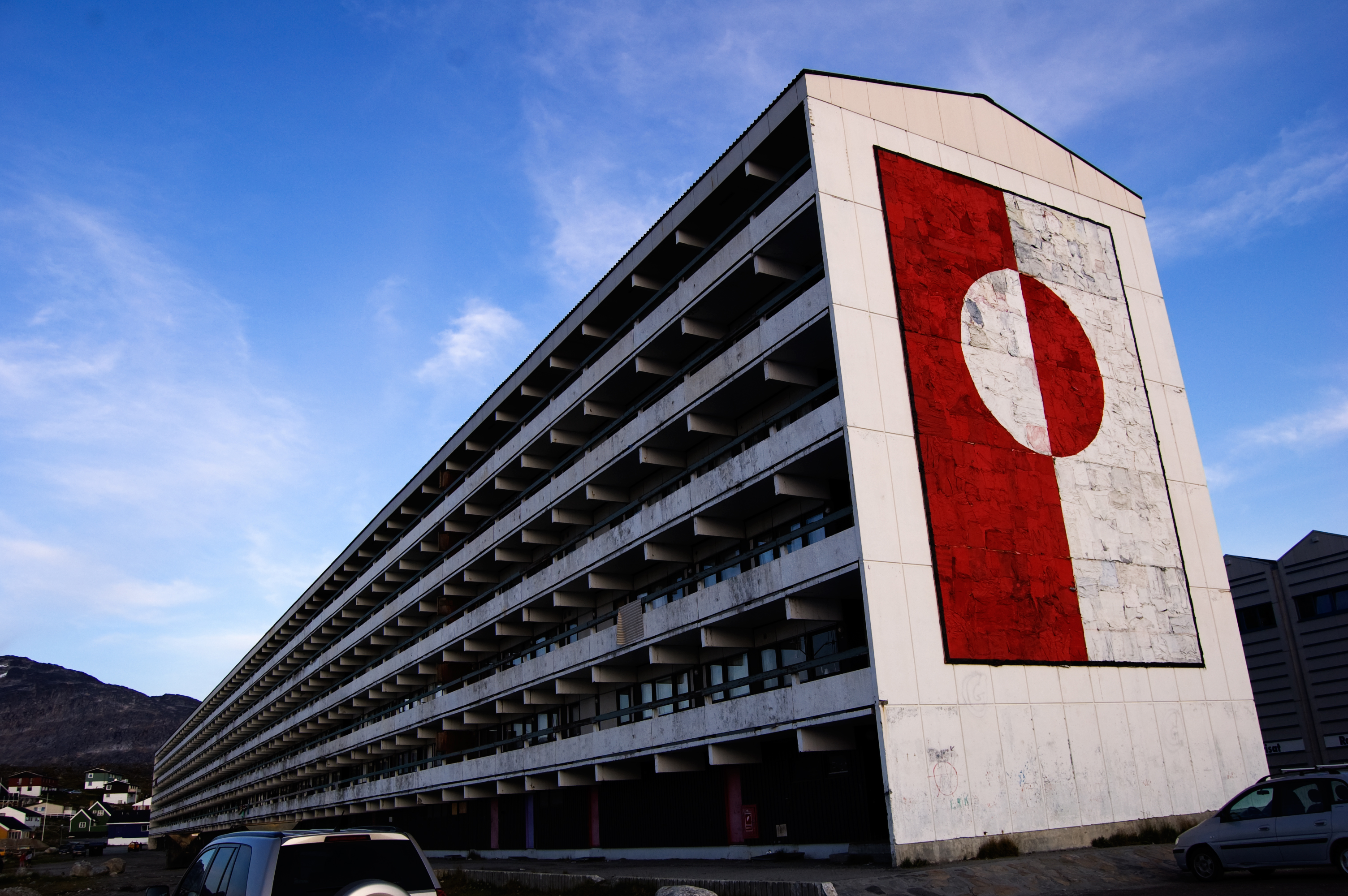
Blok P, once Greenland's largest building and home to about 1% of its population, was demolished on October 19, 2012.

Greenland has an estimated population of 56,583. As of 2012, the total life expectancy was 71.25 years, with males having a life expectancy of 68.6 years and females with 74.04 years.

Kommuneqarfik Sermersooq is Greenland's most populous municipality, with 24,382 residents. It includes Nuuk, the capital and largest city of the territory. Avannaata Kommunia is the second most populous municipality, with 10,846 residents, primarily in Ilulissat, its largest city. Qeqqata Kommunia has a population of 9,204, centered around Sisimiut. Kommune Kujalleq follows with 6,145 residents, primarily in Qaqortoq, while Kommune Qeqertalik is the least populated municipality, with 6,058 inhabitants, mainly centered in Aasiaat.

In 2021, Greenland's population was 56,421, with 18,800 residents living in the capital, Nuuk. Most Greenlanders inhabit the fjord-lined southwestern coast, which experiences a comparatively mild climate for its high latitude. While the majority of the population resides in colder coastal areas north of 64°N, the warmer regions, such as the vegetated surroundings of Narsarsuaq, remain sparsely populated.

Greenland has a population density of 0.14 people per square kilometer (0.054 people per square mile), making it the least densely populated territory in the world. Due to its sparse population and vast geography, transportation between cities and towns is limited to planes, boats, snowmobiles, and dog sleds.

The majority of Greenland's population identifies as Lutheran. Historically, the Moravian Brothers, a congregation with ties to Christiansfeld in South Jutland and partially of German origin, played a significant religious role. There is only one Jew on the island, in the southern community of Narsaq.

An estimated 89.7% of the population is of Greenlandic multiethnic European-Inuit heritage, 7.8% is Danish, 1.1% other Nordic, and 1.4% from other backgrounds. The multiethnic European-Inuit population includes those with Danish, Norwegian, Faroese, Icelandic, Dutch (whaler), German, and American ancestry.

Greenland's population has decreased since 2019, primarily due to emigration. This trend is driven by limited educational opportunities within Greenland, prompting citizens to seek better job prospects, improved healthcare, and the challenges of living in a harsh Arctic climate. Many young people move to Denmark for education and career advancement, contributing to the population decrease.

A 2015 comprehensive genetic study of Greenlanders revealed that modern-day Inuit in Greenland are direct descendants of the Thule culture pioneers who settled in the region during the 13th century. The study also showed approximately 25% European admixture, stemming from colonizers who arrived in the 16th century. Contrary to previous hypotheses, no genetic evidence of Viking settlers has been identified among Greenland's population.

== Ethnic groups ==
Ethnic groups of Greenland (2018)
Ethnic groups	percent
Inuit	89.7%
Danish	7.8%
Other Nordic	1.1%
Other	1.4%

Significant minority groups
Nationality	Population (2024)
Philippines	921
Thailand	349
Poland	138
Iceland	122
Sri Lanka	121
Sweden	78
China	65
Norway	63
Germany	54
USA	39
Other America	39

Greenland's population is primarily composed of Greenlandic Inuit, including individuals of mixed heritage, as well as Danish Greenlanders and other Europeans and North Americans. As of a 2009 estimate, the Inuit population constituted approximately 85–90% of the total. There are 6,792 Danish residents in Greenland, accounting for 12% of the population. In recent years, the territory has seen notable immigration from Asia, particularly from the Philippines, Thailand, and China.

== Languages ==
Greenlandic, specifically West Greenlandic or Kalaallisut, is spoken by nearly 50,000 people and became the official language of Greenland in 2009. The majority of the population speaks both Danish and West Greenlandic Kalaallisut, with both languages having been used in public affairs since the introduction of home rule in 1979. Despite Greenlandic's official status, Danish remains widely used in administration, education, skilled trades, and other professions. The orthography of Greenlandic, initially established in 1851, was revised in 1973. Greenland has a literacy rate of 100%.

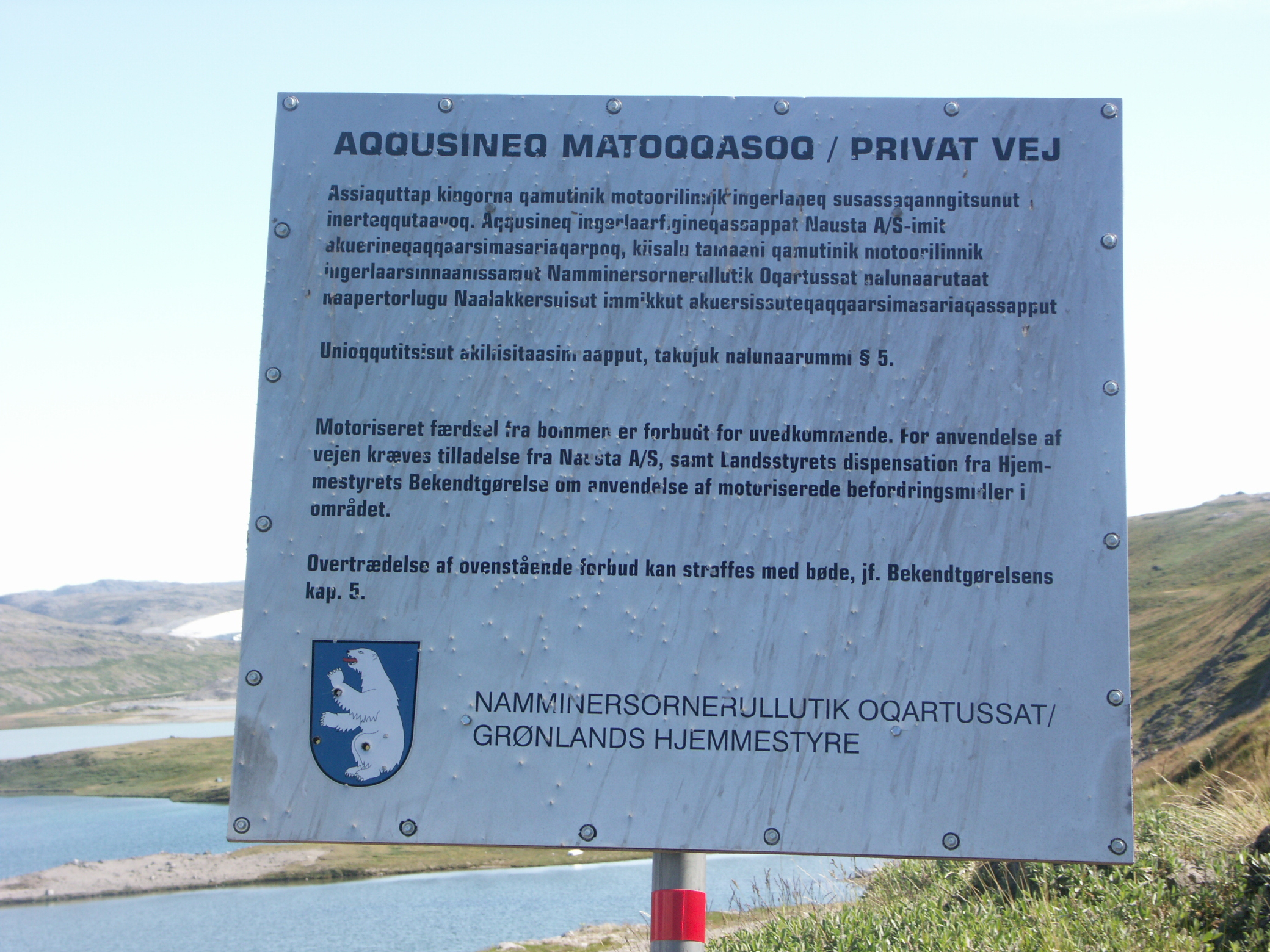
Sign in Greenland written in Greenlandic and Danish

Approximately 12% of Greenland's population speaks Danish as a first or sole language, primarily comprising Danish immigrants. For many, Danish remains the dominant language, particularly in Nuuk and other larger towns. Historically, Danish served as a second language for most multiethnic Inuit ancestors, although Greenlandic was more dominant in smaller settlements. In larger towns, especially Nuuk, Danish speakers have held significant social influence.

Debate continues over the evolving roles of Greenlandic and Danish in Greenland's future. While Greenlandic holds official status and is widely spoken, Danish remains critical for administration and business. English, increasingly important in Greenland, is now taught starting from the first year of school.

West Greenland has historically been the most populous region of the island and the center of its de facto official language, Greenlandic. However, linguistic diversity persists in other regions. Approximately 3,000 people speak East Greenlandic, referred to as Tunumiisut, and nearly 1,000 residents around Qaanaaq in the north speak Inuktun. Notably, Inuktun shares closer similarities with the Inuit languages of Canada than with other Greenlandic dialects.

These regional varieties of Greenlandic are largely unintelligible to each other, with some linguists even classifying Tunumiisut as a separate language. A UNESCO report has labeled these other varieties as endangered, prompting efforts to preserve and protect the East Greenlandic dialect in particular.

== Education ==
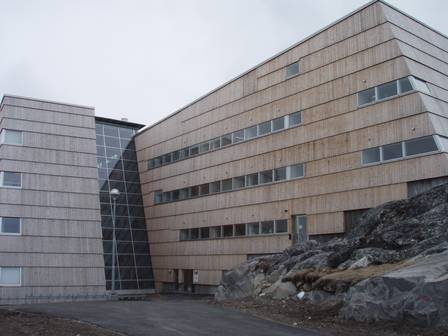
The University of Greenland campus is in Nuuk.

Education in Greenland closely follows the Danish system and is free and compulsory for children aged 7 to 16. The primary language of instruction is Greenlandic, with Danish introduced as a second language in primary school. The education system aims to foster cultural and linguistic unity through a bilingual model, integrating Greenlandic and Danish-speaking students.

The public school system, managed by municipalities, encompasses approximately 100 schools. It focuses on teaching Greenlandic from kindergarten through high school, while also providing vocational and technical education during secondary school. For higher education, the University of Greenland in Nuuk provides local academic opportunities, while vocational training institutions are also available. Students who wish to study in Denmark have equal admission rights and access to scholarships, provided they meet residency requirements.

Since 1994, reforms in bilingual education have generated positive results, ensuring students gain proficiency in both Greenlandic and Danish and promoting equal access to education across linguistic groups.

== Religion ==
The traditional religion of the nomadic Inuit was shamanistic, centered around appeasing a vengeful and fingerless sea goddess known as Sedna, who was believed to control the success of seal and whale hunts.

The first Norse settlers in Greenland worshipped the Norse pantheon, but a major shift occurred when Leif Erikson, the son of Erik the Red, converted to Christianity during a visit to Norway in 999 under the influence of King Olaf Tryggvason. Leif returned to Greenland with missionaries who quickly established a Christian presence, including sixteen parishes, monasteries, and a bishopric at Garðar.

The rediscovery of Greenland's Norse settlements and the spread of Protestant Reformation ideas were main motivations behind Denmark's recolonization of Greenland in the 18th century. Under the direction of the Royal Mission College in Copenhagen, Norwegian and Danish Lutherans, as well as German Moravian missionaries, undertook expeditions to locate the lost Norse settlements. However, they found no surviving Norse inhabitants and instead focused their efforts on converting the Inuit population to Christianity.

Significant figures in Greenland's Christianization included Hans Egede, his son Poul Egede, and German missionary Matthias Stach. Hans Egede established the first permanent Danish-Norwegian mission on Kangeq Island in 1721, where efforts to translate religious texts began. The New Testament was translated into Greenlandic in parts over several years, but the full Bible was not translated until 1900. A modern translation of the Bible, reflecting contemporary Greenlandic orthography, was completed in 2000.

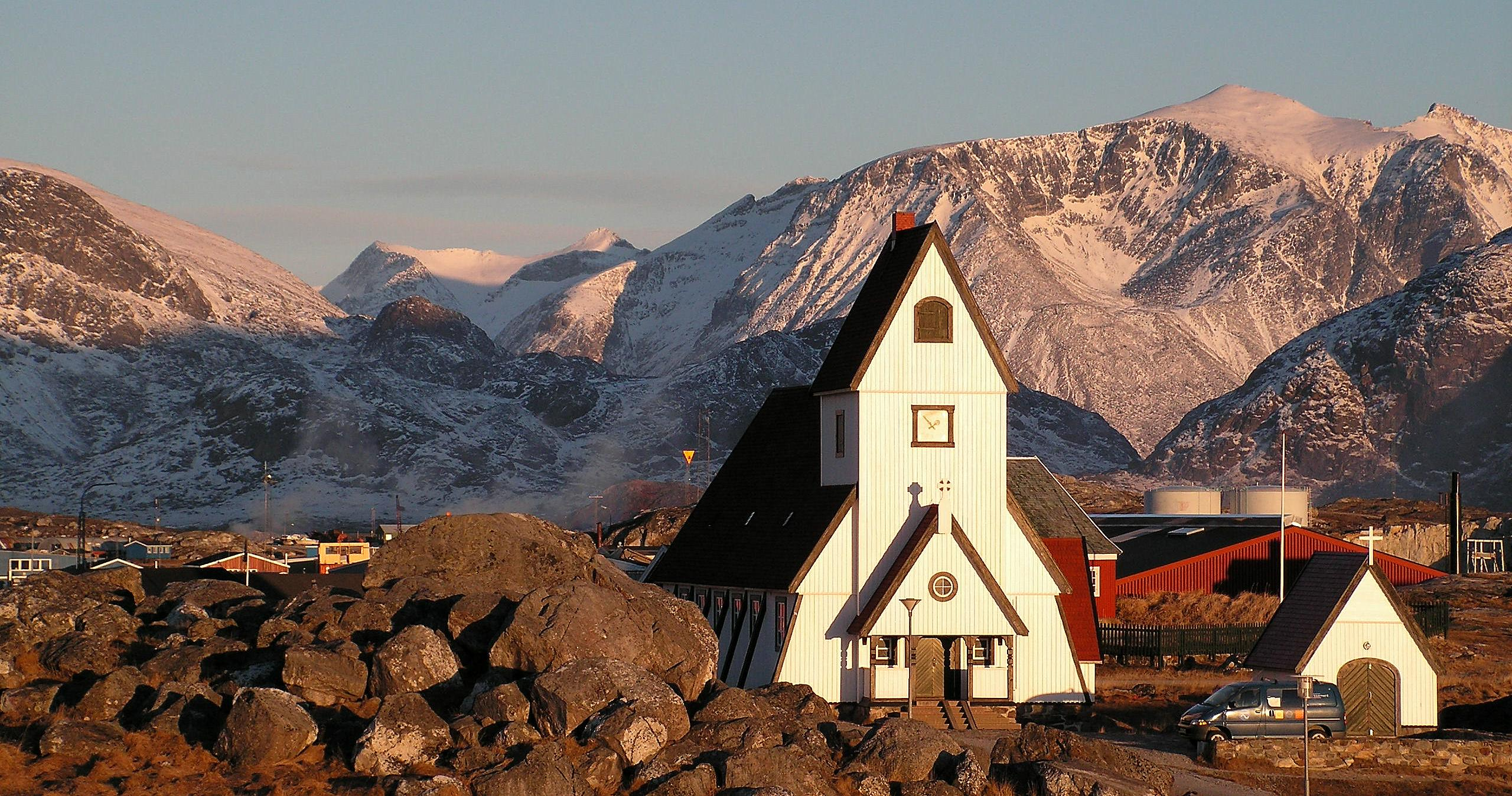
Most Greenlandic villages, including Nanortalik, have their own church.

The predominant religion in Greenland is Protestant Christianity, primarily represented by the Church of Denmark, which follows Lutheran teachings. Although there are no official census records on religious affiliation in Greenland, the Bishop of Greenland, Sofie Petersen, estimates that approximately 85% of the population are members of the Church of Denmark. As part of the Danish Realm, the Church of Denmark holds the status of the established church under the Danish Constitution, which extends to Greenland.

In Greenland, the Roman Catholic minority is pastorally served by the Roman Catholic Diocese of Copenhagen, which oversees Catholic activities across the Danish Realm. While Catholics form a small portion of the population, their presence is supported through limited church infrastructure and pastoral care.

Christian missionaries continue to operate in Greenland, with a significant presence from charismatic movements. Their efforts are primarily focused on strengthening the faith of existing Christians rather than actively seeking to convert non-believers.

Greenland's first and only permanent Jewish resident moved to Narsaq in 2001.

== Social issues ==
Greenland faces significant social challenges, including high suicide rates, which have led to the country being reported as having the highest suicide rate in the world according to a 2010 census. These mental health issues are often linked to a combination of cultural, environmental, and socio-economic factors, including the impacts of isolation and limited access to mental health services.

Alcoholism is another prominent issue in Greenland, with consumption rates peaking in the 1980s at twice the level in Denmark. Although alcohol consumption has slightly decreased by 2010, it remains a major social concern due to its high cost and the negative effects it has on communities. The high prices of alcohol in Greenland make it an expensive habit; further, the associated social problems, including addiction, domestic violence, and health issues, have a considerable impact on society.

HIV/AIDS prevalence was once high in Greenland, peaking in the 1990s, but it has since decreased significantly due to effective public health initiatives and treatments. As of recent years, the prevalence rate has dropped to around c. 0.13%, which is lower than in many other countries.

Unemployment in Greenland remains higher than in Denmark, with rates around 6.8% in 2017, compared to Denmark's 5.6%.

=== Fertility control ===
The practice of forced sterilization and the widespread use of intrauterine devices (IUDs) on Greenlandic Inuit women and girls during the 1960s and 1970s is a controversial chapter in the history of Denmark and Greenland. As part of a population control policy, roughly half of all fertile Greenlandic Inuit women and girls were fitted with IUDs, including children as young as 12. These procedures were often carried out without consent or knowledge from the girls' parents; in some cases, girls were taken directly from school to have the devices inserted. This practice was also applied to Inuit girls attending boarding schools in Denmark.

This issue came to public attention decades later, and in 2022, the Danish Health Minister, Magnus Heunicke, confirmed that an official investigation would take place to uncover the decisions and actions that led to the forced procedures. Additionally, it was found that after Greenland gained control of its healthcare system in 1991, Greenlandic doctors continued the practice on some Inuit women, despite the legal and ethical concerns.

== Culture ==
Greenlandic culture is a unique fusion of traditional Inuit (Kalaallit, Tunumiit, and Inughuit) traditions and Scandinavian influences, reflecting the island's history and geography. Inuit culture, particularly that of the Kalaallit, has a rich artistic heritage dating back thousands of years. One notable art form is the creation of tupilak, or "spirit objects," which are intricately carved figures often imbued with symbolic or spiritual significance. Originally, tupilaks were used in shamanic rituals, but today, they are primarily made as art pieces.

Traditional art-making practices, including carving, thrive in regions like Ammassalik, where local artists often work with materials like wood, stone, and bone. Sperm whale ivory remain especially valued mediums for carving.

=== Music ===
Greenland has a successful, though small, music culture. Notable Greenlandic bands and artists include Sumé, Chilly Friday, Nanook, Siissisoq, Nuuk Posse, and Rasmus Lyberth, who competed in the Danish national final for the 1979 Eurovision Song Contest, singing in Greenlandic. Singer-songwriter Simon Lynge is the first Greenlandic artist to release an album across the United Kingdom and perform at the Glastonbury Festival. In 2021, UNESCO recognized Inuit drum dancing and singing as part of the Intangible Cultural Heritage of Humanity.

The drum, or qilaat, is the traditional Greenlandic instrument, crafted from driftwood or walrus ribs and covered with polar bear or walrus stomach or bladder. Unlike typical drumming, the drum is played from underneath the frame with a stick. Traditional drum dances involved simple melodies and served dual purposes: dispelling fear during long, dark winters and resolving disputes. In the latter case, individuals would take turns drumming and singing to ridicule each other, with the audience's laughter determining the winner.

Shamans also used the drum in rituals to conjure spirits. However, after missionaries arrived in the 18th century, drum dances were banned as pagan practices. They were replaced by polyphonic choral singing, known for its distinctive sound, blending German hymns, influenced by the Herrnhuter Brüdergemeinde, with secular songs. Whalers from Scandinavia, Germany, and Scotland introduced instruments like the fiddle and accordion, as well as dances such as the polka, or kalattuut, which is now performed with intricate steps.

=== Sport ===
Sports play a significant role in Greenlandic culture, with the population maintaining an active lifestyle. Popular sports include association football, track and field, handball, and skiing. Handball, often regarded as the national sport, saw the men's national team rank among the top 20 globally in 2001.

Greenland's natural environment offers ideal conditions for activities like skiing, fishing, snowboarding, ice climbing, and rock climbing. However, hiking and mountain climbing are more commonly enjoyed by the general population. While Greenland's landscape is not well-suited for golf, Nuuk is home to a golf course.

=== Cuisine ===
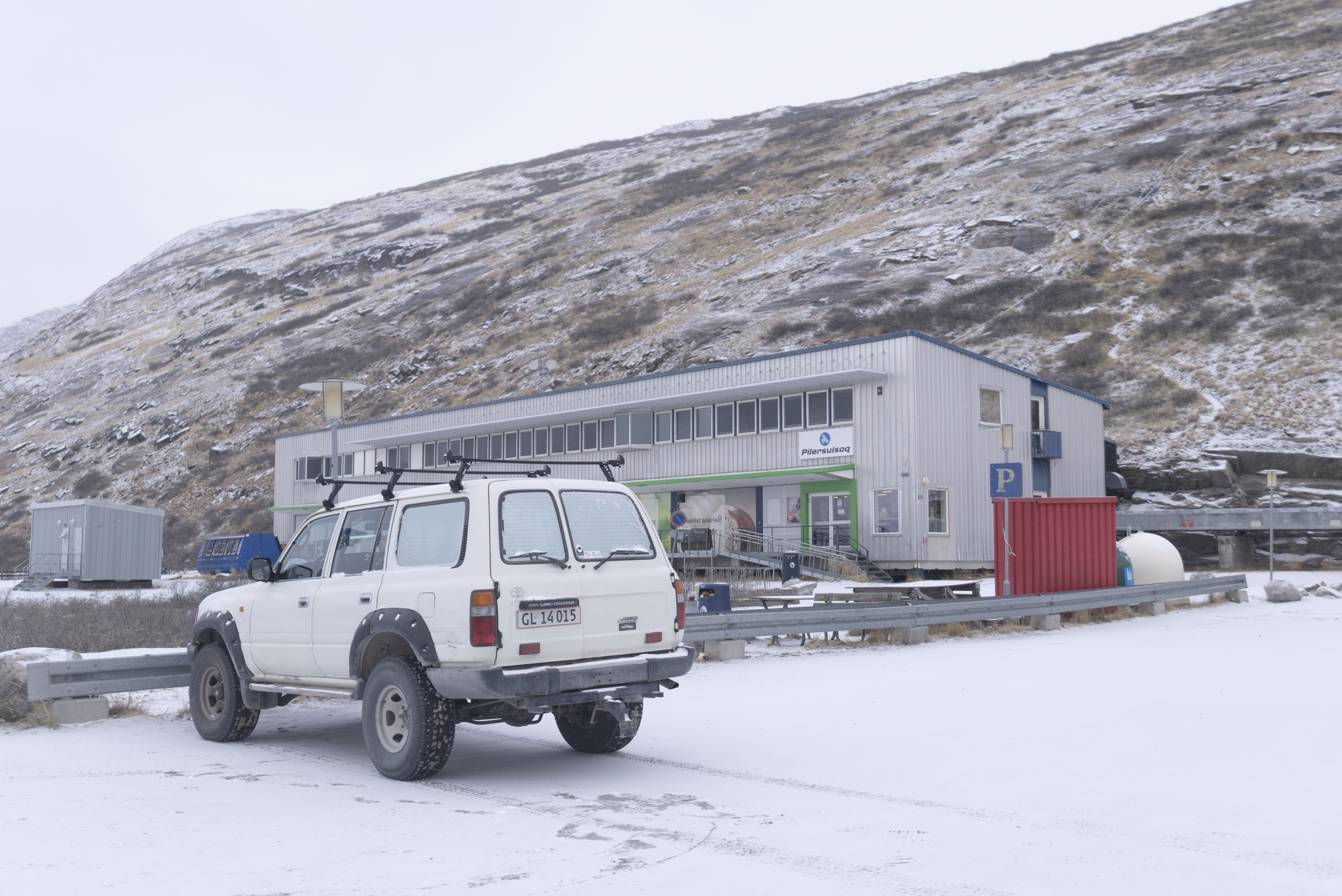
Pilersuisoq Supermarket in Kangerlussuaq.

The national dish of Greenland is suaasat, a traditional soup prepared with seal meat. The Greenlandic diet heavily relies on meat from marine mammals, game, birds, and fish, as the glacial landscape limits agricultural options. Most ingredients are sourced from the ocean, and seasoning is typically limited to salt and pepper.

Greenlandic coffee is a notable dessert beverage, distinct for being "flaming" as it is set alight before serving. Made with coffee, whiskey, Kahlúa, Grand Marnier, and topped with whipped cream, it is stronger than the more widely known Irish coffee.

=== Media ===
Kalaallit Nunaata Radioa (KNR) is Greenland's public broadcasting company and an associate member of both Eurovision and the Nordvision network. Employing nearly 100 people, KNR is among the largest organizations in the territory. Nuuk also has its own radio and television station, including Nanoq Media, a local television channel established on August 1, 2002. Nanoq Media is the largest local station in Greenland, reaching over 4,000 households, approximately 75% of all households in Nuuk.

Greenland has two nationally distributed newspapers. Sermitsiaq, a weekly publication named after the nearby Sermitsiaq mountain, is released every Friday, with its online edition updated multiple times daily. It was initially distributed only in Nuuk, but expanded nationwide in the 1980s. Atuagagdliutit/Grønlandsposten (AG) is a bi-weekly newspaper, published in Greenlandic as Atuagagdliutit and in Danish as Grønlandsposten, with all articles appearing in both languages. It is released every Tuesday and Thursday.

=== Fine arts ===
The Inuit of Greenland have a rich tradition of arts and crafts, including the carving of tupilaks, small sculptures representing avenging spirits or mythical beings. The term "tupilak," from Greenlandic, translates to the soul or spirit of a deceased person. These carvings, often no more than 20 centimetres (8 in) tall, are traditionally crafted from walrus ivory and feature grotesque or imaginative designs. Once associated with shamanic rituals, tupilaks are now mainly regarded as collectible artifacts. Modern Greenlandic artisans continue to work with native materials such as musk ox wool, seal fur, soapstone, reindeer antlers, and gemstones.

Greenlandic painting began in the mid-19th century with Aron von Kangeq, whose watercolors and drawings illustrated traditional sagas and myths. In the 20th century, landscape and animal painting emerged alongside printmaking and book illustration. Artists such as Kistat Lund and Buuti Pedersen earned international acclaim for their expressive landscapes, while Anne-Birthe Hove focused on themes of Greenlandic social life. The Nuuk Art Museum showcases these works along with others.
