= Music of Greenland =

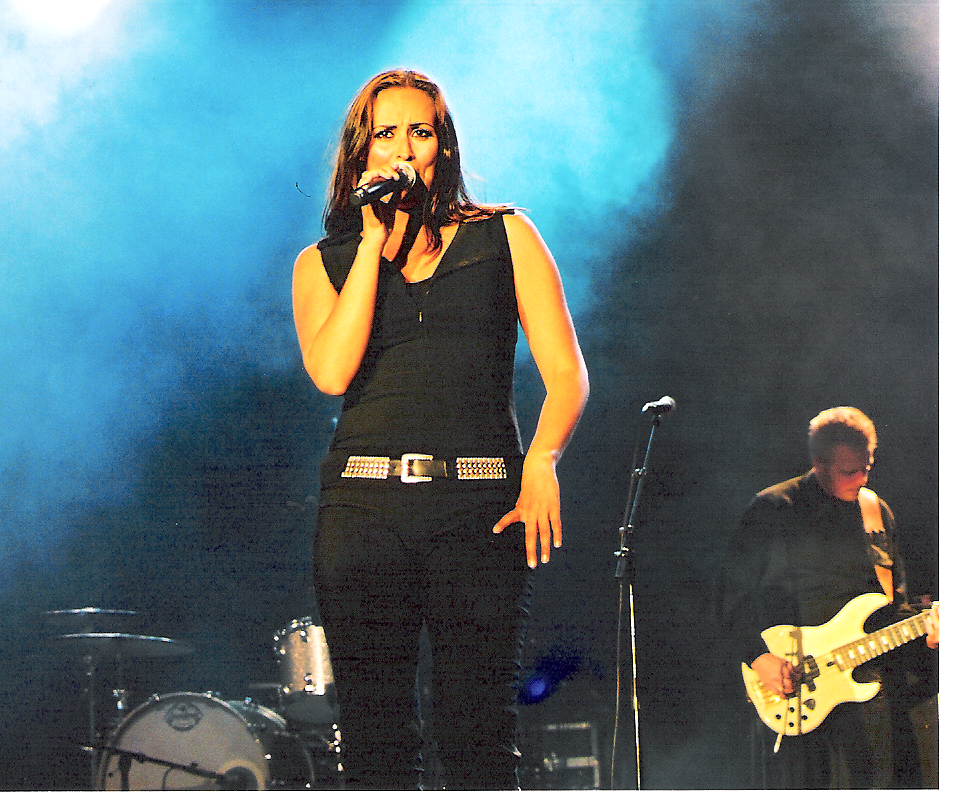
Julie Berthelsen, Greenlandic-Danish singer, performing in Copenhagen, 2007

The music of Greenland is a mixture of two primary strands, Inuit and Danish, mixed with influences from the United States and United Kingdom.

Greenland's musical character has been described as "definitely a rock country, both musically and literally" according to Greenlandic drummer Hans Rosenberg. The Danish Ministry of Foreign Affairs describes all Greenlandic music except the drum dances as influenced by external styles.

== Folk music ==
The Inuit and the Danish peoples of Greenland have both maintained their distinct styles of folk music. Country-wide folk traditions included storytelling, which declined greatly after the introduction of the South Greenland Printing Press in 1857.

Traditional music which has best survived European contact can be found in the east and northeast of the island. It includes sacred drum dances played on an oval drum made of a wooden frame with a bear-bladder on top. Drum dances are the "only truly indigenous music" in Greenland, and are part of a roots revival in modern times. Shamans used drums as part of their religious affairs and sometimes organized singing duels between rivals in which the performer who got the most laughs from the audience won. Inuit drum dances were a declining tradition and in modern Greenland are being replaced by amateur theater groups like Silamiut, who used elements of indigenous music with masks, face painting and other techniques. Piseq are a form of personal song that comment on daily life; these are often handed down from generation to generation. Greenlandic Inuit folk songs are performed to tell stories, play games and tease or charm others.

=== Inuit music ===
The Inuit of Greenland share a musical tradition with related peoples across the Canadian territories of the Yukon, Nunavut and the Northwest Territories, as well as the US state of Alaska and part of eastern Russia. Greenlandic Inuit are part of the Eastern Arctic group; the Eastern Arctic Inuit of Canada and Alaska are part of the same music area as the Central Arctic Inuit, as opposed to the distinct styles of the Western Inuit.

Greenlandic Inuit music is largely based around singing and drums, the latter being generally reserved for large celebrations and other gatherings. Though there is much folk vocal music, there is no Inuit purely instrumental tradition with no accompaniment by singing or dancing. Greenlandic drums are mostly frame drums made of animal skin stretched over a wooden frame and decorated with decorative and symbolic motifs by the drummer. Aside from drums, whistles, bull-roarers and buzzers are also widespread, and the jaw harp and fiddle are both found, most likely recent imports.

Historical recordings of this music are done since 1905. This traditional Greenlandic music is performed also today.

==== Drum dances ====
Greenlandic drum dances are, like the relatives found in Eastern and Central Canada, based around a single dancer who composes songs sung by his family while he dances, usually in a qaggi, a snow-house built just for community events such as the drum dance. The men's drum dancing skills are evaluated by his endurance in his lengthy performance and the nature of his compositions. Drum dances are an important element of Greenlandic Inuit cultural cohesion, and function as personal expression, pure entertainment and social sanction.

Many drum dances are competitive in nature, featuring two song cousins who humorously sing and dance, while pointing out the flaws in the other. This is generally a light-hearted, convivial event, but is also sometimes used to settle serious duels between warring families or individuals; the jokes are prepared ahead of time and the person who evokes the most laughter from the audience is considered the victor.

==== Other Inuit folk song traditions ====
Many Inuit folk games revolve around song as well, including string games, hide-and-seek, juggling and rhymes and riddles. The katajjaq tradition is also well-known; it is a vocal contest between two women, standing facing each other. They sing songs, using throat-singing and imitating animal cries or other sounds. Katajjaq is a game, but is often stopped because both women begin laughing.

In addition to the drum dance and game songs, Greenlandic Inuit have a tradition of piseq (piserk, personal song) songs. These are expressive, spiritual, superstitious or narrative and may be composed for drum dances. Piseq and other vocal traditions aside from song games include a number of styles and tones, which vary depending on the social context of the performance. For example, a soft vocal tone is used both for character illustration in a narrative song and for personal songs in private settings. Many songs use only a few real words, interspersed among numerous vocables, or non-lexical syllables like ai-ya-yainga. Inuit songs are strophic and mostly use six different pitches; textual and melodic motifs are common. A song's word length and accentuation determines the rhythm, giving the songs a recitative-like style.

=== European music ===
With the arrival of Danes, new instruments and forms of European-derived music became popular like the fiddle, accordion and Christian hymns, while Moravian missionaries introduced violins, brass instruments and a tradition of purely instrumental music. The most influential Moravian importation, however, was the polyphonic choir, which has produced popular modern vocal groups like Mik. At some point, pipe organs were introduced to some churches in Greenland, and a number of these instruments can be found scattered around the country, though all are small in comparison to many of the organs found in major churches in Europe and elsewhere. Kalattuut (dansemik) is a long-standing form of Inuit polka, which produced popular songs and virtuosos like accordion player Louis Andreasen. There is also a modern style called vaigat, which is similar to country music.

== Classical music ==
Some composers of European classical music have Greenlandic themes in their music, including Poul Rovsing Olsen and Adrian Vernon Fish whose output includes over fifty works inspired by Greenland, its terrain, icescapes and music. Among his oeuvre are the four Greenland symphonies (numbers 3, 4, 10 and 13). The modern composer Mads Lumholdt (also member of the orchestra Northern Voices, singer in the orchestra Nowhereland and in No Offence, a vocal band) has become well-known, and his work Shaman, which debuted at the 2004-5 Etoiles Polaires Arctic Culture Festival was nominated for the Nordic Council Music Prize for its fusion of traditional Greenlandic music with modern styles and technology. The Nordic describes his work as "seeking to allow the traditional Greenlandic culture to be communicated through contemporary cultural language in such a way that respect for the original culture is preserved on the one hand yet passed on to a broader, contemporary audience on the other hand".

Greenland's national anthem is "Nunarput utoqqarsuanngoravit", which translates as Our Country, Who's Become So Old. It has been official since 1916, and was composed by Jonathan Petersen with words by Henrik Lund, both Greenlanders.

== Popular music ==
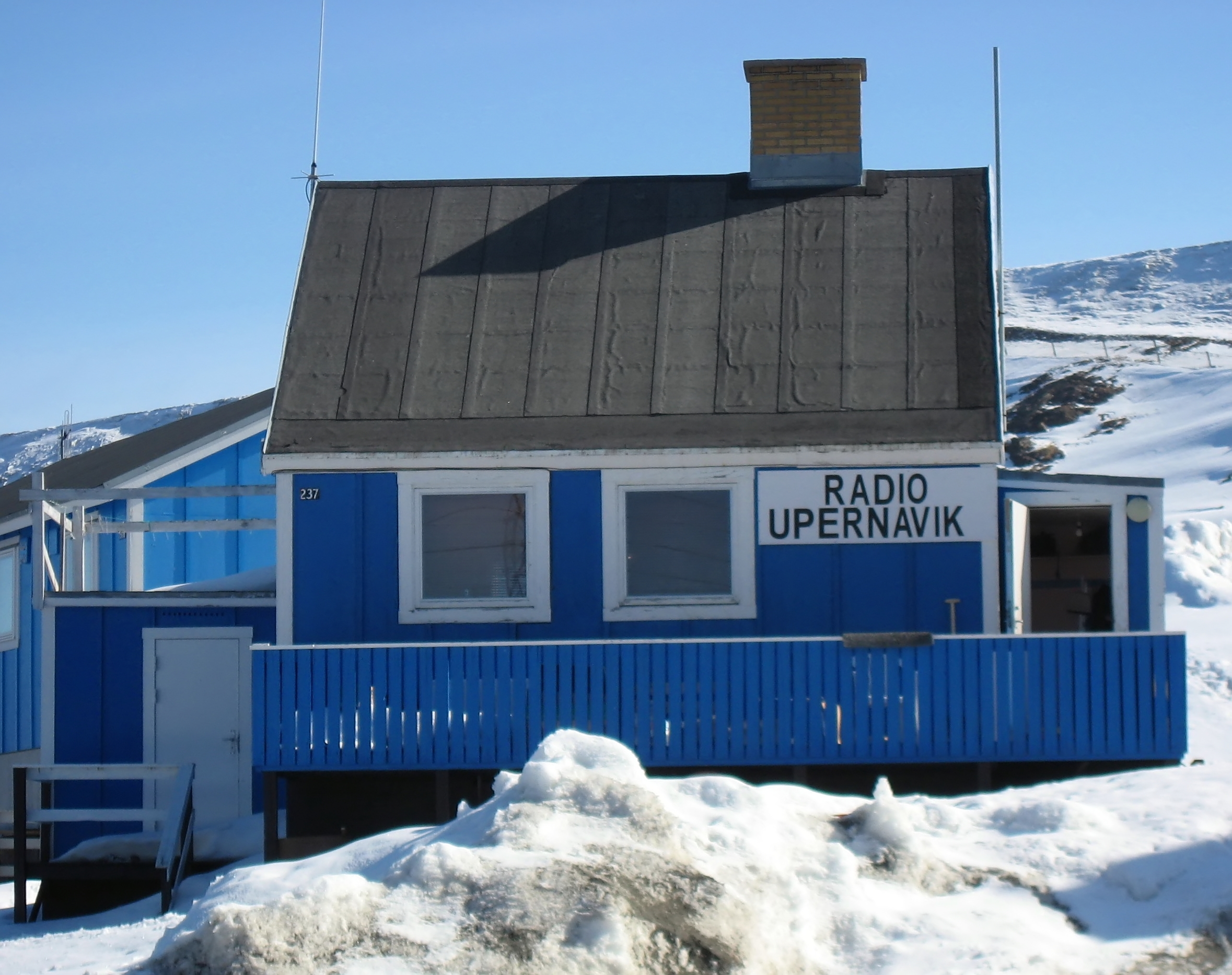
Local radio station in Upernavik, 2007

Greenland was isolated from modern North American and European popular music until well into the mid-20th century. Early popular groups included the pioneering local Nuuk Orleans Jazz Band.

=== Hip hop ===
Since 1984, American hip hop has had a major influence, and a hip hop crew, Nuuk Posse, has been one of the most successful groups of recent years.

=== Rock ===
The Greenlandic rock and pop began in earnest in 1973, when ULO released the band Sume's Sumut; it was purchased by an estimated twenty percent of Greenland's total population, and singlehandedly kickstarted the local rock scene by uniquely singing in the Greenlandic language and using elements of traditional drum dances in the music. The singer Rasmus Lyberth did the most to change Greenlandic music by performing for simple entertainment rather than functionality; indeed, he took part in the Danish preselection for the 1979 Eurovision Song Contest, performing in Greenlandic. Other local performers of note include G-60 and Ole Kristiansen. The 1980s saw Greenland become home to a number of bands inspired by Jamaican reggae and African American funk, like Aalut and Zikaza. Modern Greenland is home to the annual Nipiaa rock festival, held in Aasiaat, and performers like Chilly Friday, throat-singer Sylvia Watt-Cloutier and Karina Moller.

Famous modern rock bands include Kalaat, Siissisoq, Lars Willsen, Angu Motzfeldt, Pukuut, X-it, Fiassuit, Nanook, Small Time Giants and UltimaCorsa.

=== Metal ===
A growing metal scene has emerged in Greenland, with black and death metal groups such as The Perfect Mass, Moonlight Drowns, Failed to Failure and Silence.cold.alone. beginning to release music through the 2010s. One early pioneer of Greenlandic Metal is Arctic Spirits, who sing exclusively in the Inuit language.

== Music industry ==
The largest record label in Greenland is ULO, from the town of Sisimiut; it was created by Malik Hoegh and Karsten Sommer. ULO releases both Greenlandic rock bands like Sume, pop singers like Rasmus Lyberth, and hip hop music crews like Nuuk Posse as well as Inuit folk music. Elements of modern Greenlandic music have also been used in the music of Kristian Blak, a Danish-Faroese jazz musician.

Summertime festivals called aussivik have become an important part of modern Greenlandic culture, and are based on an older custom that was revived in the 20th century along with drum dances and other elements.

Kalaallit Nunaata Radioa (Radio Greenland) is the most important media institution in the country. It is an independent body administered by the Government of Greenland.
