= 2020 in Nordic music =

The following is a list of notable events and releases that happened in Nordic music in 2020.

== Events ==
=== January ===
- 1 January – The 2020 season of Denmark's X Factor competition is launched.
- 16 January – The Royal Swedish Opera appoints Alan Gilbert as its next music director; his tenure will begin in spring 2021.
- 28 January – Mia Winter Wallace announces that she has left Abbath.
- 30 January – The Léonie Sonning Music Prize is awarded to Unsuk Chin.

=== February ===
- 9 February – Icelandic composer Hildur Guðnadóttir becomes the first woman for twenty years, and only the fourth of all time, to win the Academy Award for Best Original Score, which is awarded for her score for Joker.
- 29 February – The Söngvakeppnin final, held in Reykjavik, is won by Gagnamagnið with the song "Think About Things". The winners do not go on to represent Iceland in the Eurovision Song Contest because of the COVID-19 pandemic that causes the whole contest to be cancelled.

=== March ===
- 7 March
  - The Dansk Melodi Grand Prix 2020 is held in Copenhagen, hosted by Hella Joof and Rasmus Bjerg, but without a live audience as a result of the COVID-19 pandemic in Denmark
  - Aksel Kankaanranta wins the Uuden Musiikin Kilpailu and is selected as Finland's representative in the 2020 Eurovision Song Contest (later cancelled), with the song "Looking Back".
- 16 March – Alexi Laiho and Daniel Freyberg announce the formation of a new heavy metal supergroup, Bodom After Midnight, also including drummer Waltteri Vayrynen and bassist Mitja Toivonen.
- 22 March – Guitarist Niklas Sundin announces that he is leaving Swedish metal band Dark Tranquillity.
- 30 March – Finnish band Dark the Suns announce they are re-forming by releasing a preview of their new single.

=== April ===
- 23 April – Norwegian singer Sigrid is among those participating in the recording of a charity single, "Times Like These", by the "Live Lounge Allstars". The single goes to no 1 in the UK charts and does well in other European and North American charts.

=== May ===
- 14 May – The final of Sveriges 12:a, a one-off music competition in the Eurovision format, is broadcast in Sweden by Sveriges Television. The winner is Icelandic band Daði og Gagnamagnið, performing "Think About Things" in English, which had been intended as Iceland's entry for the cancelled Eurovision Song Contest.
- 16 May – In a special vote, BBC viewers select ABBA's 1974 Eurovision-winning song, "Waterloo", as the best Eurovision song of all time.
- 29 May – John Lundvik wins Swedish TV's Let's Dance 2020 series.

=== July ===
- 30 July – DJ Carl Cox releases a remix of "Farmacia (Homage To Frankfurt)", a 2019 collaboration by Jez Phunk and Denmark's Kenneth Bager.

=== September ===
- 4 September – Finnish conductor Santtu-Matias Rouvali's first recording with the Philharmonia Orchestra is released: Swan Lake, a year before he takes up his appointment as the orchestra's Principal Conductor.
- 22 September – Sweden's Idol contestant Caspar Camitz tests positive for COVID-19 and has to drop out of the first performance. Three days later another contestant, Herman Silow, also tests positive, and the following day so does Indra Elg.
- 30 September – Despite rumours that Sveriges Television have asked him to return, it is confirmed that David Sundin will not be a host at the 2021 Melodifestivalen.

=== December ===
- December 4 – The Idol 2020 final in Sweden was won by Nadja Holm. It was held at the studios in Spånga for the first time since 2006, because of the COVID restrictions.
- December 19 – The final of the 2020 series of Finnish TV series Vain elämää is scheduled to take place.

== Albums released ==
=== January ===
Day	Album	Artist	Label	Notes	Ref.
2	Manifest	Amaranthe	Nuclear Blast	First album to feature Nils Molin	
10	Cell-0	Apocalyptica	Silver Lining Music	First album after a 4-year break	
17	Contemporary Concertos by Pesson, Abrahamsen & Strasnoy	Alexandre Tharaud	Erato	Includes Left, Alone by Hans Abrahamsen	
17	To Fathom the Master’s Grand Design	Horned Almighty			
31	Killection	Lordi	AFM Records		

=== February ===
Day	Album	Artist	Label	Notes	Ref.
7	Valittu kansa	Antti Tuisku	Warner Music Finland	Tuisku's sixth number-one album	
14	Telemark (EP)	Ihsahn	Candlelight	First of two companion five-song EPs	
14	Splid	Kvelertak	Rise Records	Recorded with Kurt Ballou at Godcity Studio	
21	No Absolution	Lost Society		Co-written with Joonas Parkkonen	
21	Myopia	Agnes Obel	Strange Harvest Limited		
28	The Great Conspiracy	Nils Patrik Johansson	Metalville	Concept album about the unsolved murder of Swedish Prime Minister Olof Palme	

=== March ===
Day	Album	Artist	Label	Notes	Ref.
6	Violent Pop	Blind Channel	Ranka Kustannus	The band define their musical style as "violent pop"	
13	Feeding the Machine	Wolf	Century Media Records		
20	Folkesange	Myrkur	Relapse Records		
20	Gothica Fennica, Vol. 1	Ville Valo		EP - First solo release	

=== April ===
Day	Album	Artist	Label	Notes	Ref.
3	The Dark Delight	Dynazty		First single from album was released in January	
10	Human. :II: Nature.	Nightwish	Nuclear Blast	First album to feature Kai Hahto as an official band member	
17	Global Warning	Turmion Kätilöt	Nuclear Blast		
17	Í miðjum kjarnorkuvetri	JóiPé & Króli	Nuclear Blast		
24	City Burials	Katatonia			

=== May ===
Day	Album	Artist	Label	Notes	Ref.
7	KAJ 10 (Live)	KAJ		Live album	
8	Leaves of Yesteryear	Green Carnation	Season Of Mist	The band's first new album for 14 years	
8	Cerecloth	Naglfar	Century Media		
8	Black Metal	Witchcraft	Nuclear Blast	Acoustic album	
29	Lamenting of the Innocent	Sorcerer	Metal Blade	Featuring guests Johan Langquist and Svante Henryson	

=== June ===
Day	Album	Artist	Label	Notes	Ref.
12	We Are the Night	Magnus Karlsson's Free Fall	Frontiers Music Srl	Third album	
26	From a Dying Ember	Falconer	Metal Blade Records	Ninth and final studio album	
26	Call for Winter	Daniel Herskedal	Edition Records		

=== July ===
Day	Album	Artist	Label	Notes	Ref.
3	All That She Wants: The Classic Collection	Ace of Base	Edsel (Demon Music Group)	Commemorative box set	
10	Thalassic	Ensiferum	Metal Blade Records	Featuring new vocalist Pekka Montin	
17	Grim	Dark Sarah	Napalm Records		

=== August ===
Day	Album	Artist	Label	Notes	Ref.
7	Hunter Gatherer	Avatar	eOne Music		
28	Panther	Pain of Salvation	InsideOut Music	Produced by Daniel Gildenlöw & Daniel Bergstrand	
28	Flowers of Evil	Ulver	House of Mythology	Mixed by Martin Glover and Michael Rendall	

=== September ===
Day	Album	Artist	Label	Notes	Ref.
4	Swan Lake	Santtu-Matias Rouvali and the Philharmonia Orchestra	Signum Records	The Philharmonia's first recording with Rouvali as conductor. Recorded in 2019.	
18	Vredesvävd	Finntroll	Century Media Records		

=== October ===
Day	Album	Artist	Label	Notes	Ref.
2	Dance	Tingvall Trio	Skip Records		
2	Manifest	Amaranthe	Nuclear Blast	With guest appearances by Noora Louhimo, Perttu Kivilaakso, Elias Holmlid and Heidi Shepherd	
2	Utgard	Enslaved	Nuclear Blast		
9	Dawn of the Damned	Necrophobic	Century Media	Video directed by Magnus Göthlund	
16	Bluu Afroo	Pierre Dørge & New Jungle Orchestra	SteepleChase		
23	I svunnen tid	Ralph Lundsten			
23	Live! Against the World	HammerFall		Live album	
23	The Last Viking	Leaves' Eyes	AFM Records	Produced by Alexander Krull at Mastersound Studio.	
30	Under a Godless Veil	Draconian	Napalm Records		
30	Formed by Mistakes	Small Time Giants			

=== November ===
Day	Album	Artist	Label	Notes	Ref.
6	Endless Twilight of Codependent Love	Sólstafir	Season of Mist		
20	Moment	Dark Tranquillity	Nuclear Blast	First album featuring guitarists Christopher Amott and Johan Reinholdz (replacing Niklas Sundin)	
27	Edder & Bile	Cadaver	Nuclear Blast	First full-length album for 16 years	

=== December ===
Day	Album	Artist	Label	Notes	Ref.
4	Necromancy	Persuader	Frontiers Music	First album without Fredrik Hedström; includes their first single in six years	
4	A Whisp of the Atlantic (EP)	Soilwork	Nuclear Blast		

== Eurovision Song Contest ==
- Denmark in the Eurovision Song Contest 2020
- Finland in the Eurovision Song Contest 2020
- Iceland in the Eurovision Song Contest 2020
- Norway in the Eurovision Song Contest 2020
- Sweden in the Eurovision Song Contest 2020

== Classical works ==
- Hildur Guðnadóttir – Illimani
- Anders Hillborg – Through Lost Landscapes
- Marcus Paus – Children of Ginko (opera)
- Bent Sørensen – Enchantress (5 intermezzi for orchestra)

== Film and television scores ==
- Lasse Enerson – Cold Courage
- Marcus Paus - Mortal

== Deaths ==
- 3 January – Bo Winberg, 80, Swedish guitarist (The Spotnicks)
- 26 January – Santtu Lonka, 41, Finnish former drummer of To/Die/For
- 6 February – Ola Magnell, 74, Swedish singer and guitarist
- 9 February – Margareta Hallin, 88, Swedish opera singer, composer and actress
- 18 February – Jon Christensen, 76, Norwegian jazz drummer
- 27 February – Jahn Teigen, 70, Norwegian singer internationally known for his performance in the 1978 Eurovision Song Contest
- 3 March – Alf Cranner, 83, Norwegian folk singer
- 28 March – Kerstin Behrendtz, 69, radio presenter and music director (COVID-19)
- 14 April – Kerstin Meyer, 92, Swedish mezzo-soprano.
- 3 May – Bob Lander, 78, Swedish rock musician (The Spotnicks)
- 5 May – Kjell Karlsen, 88, Norwegian composer and bandleader.
- 20 May – Malin Gjörup, 56, Swedish operatic mezzo-soprano and actress (cerebral haemorrhage)
- 21 May – Berith Bohm, 87, Swedish opera singer
- 7 June – Edith Thallaug, 90, Norwegian mezzo-soprano and actress
- 3 June – Helge Rykkja, 76, poet and lyricist
- 27 June – Mats Rådberg, 72, Swedish singer
- 12 July – Jarno Sarkula, 47, Finnish musician (Alamaailman Vasarat)
- 28 July – Bent Fabric, 95, Danish pianist and composer
- 22 August – Ulla Pia, 75, Danish singer
- 6 September – Anita Lindblom, 82, Swedish singer and actress
- 8 September – Vexi Salmi, 77, Finnish lyricist
- 29 October – Alexander Vedernikov, 56, Russian chief conductor of the Royal Danish Opera (COVID)
- 26 November – Allan Botschinsky, 80, Danish jazz trumpeter
- 19 December – Pelle Alsing, 60, Swedish drummer (Roxette).
- 24 December – Roland Cedermark, 82, Swedish singer
- 29 December – Gösta Linderholm, 79, Swedish singer and composer
- December – Alexi Laiho, 41, Finnish guitarist, composer, and vocalist
