= Sumut =

Sumut may refer to:

- Sumut, a 1973 album by the Greenlandic rock band Sumé (band)
- North Sumatra, known in Indonesian as Sumatra Utara and abbreviated to Sumut
- The Children of Sumut, children's book by de:Gerda Rottschalk
- As-sumūt, directions in Arabic poetry (plural of samt سَمْت ), origin of Azimuth

== See also ==
- Sumud, a Palestinian cultural value, ideological theme and political strategy
