= Vaigat =

Vaigat may refer to:

- Sullorsuaq Strait, a strait in Greenland known in Danish as Vaigat Strait
- Vaigat, a country style within music of Greenland
