= Angu Motzfeldt =

Greenlandic singer (born 1976)

Angu Motzfeldt (born 1976) is a Greenlandic singer, composer, and songwriter. He was born in Qaqortoq, Greenland, and later moved to Nuuk. His music appeared on the soundtrack to Inuk Silis Høegh's prize-winning documentary Eskimo Weekend, as well as in Nuummioq. He appeared on the Danish TV series Forsvar as well.

In 2004, his debut album Angu was released in Greenland and Denmark, which sold 5000 copies each, for which he received a gold record award in Greenland. He then moved to Copenhagen to work on his music career. He was nominated for a Danish Music Award in the category New Act of the Year. His single "Red Lights" was number one on (Nordic) MTV's Up North chart. In 2007, he released his second album, Burning Blue Skies. Later he moved back to Nuuk and mostly focused on the career of a photographer, but he still continued to work on music and to support this he was sponsored by KODA's Greenlandic cultural funds.
