= Gitte Adler Reimer =

Greenlandic cultural anthropologist and academic administrator

Rector of the University of Greenland
- Incumbent
- Assumed office 1 December 2017

Personal details
- Born: Nuuk, Greenland
- Education: University of Greenland

Gitte Adler Reimer (formerly Tróndheim) is a Greenlandic cultural anthropologist and academic administrator serving as rector of the University of Greenland since 2017. Her research focuses on kinship, gender, and population dynamics in Greenlandic communities.

== Early life and education ==
Reimer was born in Nuuk, Greenland. Greenlandic is her mother language. She obtained a M.A. from the University of Greenland in 2000, specializing in cultural and social history with a focus on the Danish language in Greenland.

Reimer began her academic career in 2004 as an assistant professor in the Department of Cultural and Social History at the University of Greenland. During this period, she contributed to research on kinship in contemporary urban settings and published on the flexibility of Greenlandic women in Indigenous communities. She also authored a section on kinship in urban Greenland for the Arctic Human Development Report.

From 2007 to 2009, while still at the University of Greenland, she led a research project titled "Family Forms and Kinship in Greenland," which analyzed social structures in Greenlandic communities. During her doctoral studies, she was a guest studient at the University of Alaska Fairbanks and Aarhus University. In 2010, she completed her Ph.D. dissertation, Slægtskab og køn i grønlandske bysamfund – følelser af forbundethed, which examined kinship structures and gender in Greenlandic urban communities, focusing on emotions of relatedness. She expanded this work in publications on Greenlandic adoption and its role in family structures. In 2011, she earned a Ph.D. in Arctic Culture, Language, and Society from the University of Greenland. The following year, she completed a course diploma in university teaching methods.

Reimer undertook further academic training in 2016 as a trainee at the Aarhus University, School of Culture and Society. That same year, she participated in leadership development and executive coaching in Copenhagen.

== Career ==
In 2011, Reimer was promoted to associate professor and became the head of the Department of Cultural and Social History at the University of Greenland. During this time, she contributed to studies on naming and identity in Greenland and was part of a collaborative research team studying sexual health and family communication among Greenlandic youth. In 2014, Reimer was appointed head of the University of Greenland's Institute of Culture, Language, and History. That same year, she delivered a keynote speech at the 19th Inuit Studies Conference in Quebec on Greenlandic-Inuit participation and control in Arctic research. She also co-authored a study on cultural change and Inuit identities.

From 2014 to 2017, she led multiple research projects on population dynamics in Greenland. In 2015, she presented her work on gender and education in Greenland at a seminar in Nuuk hosted by the Danish Ministry for Children, Gender Equality, Integration, and Social Affairs. In 2016, she participated in a seminar on health and wellness at Dartmouth College, where she presented findings from a multi-component mixed-methods study on pregnancy dynamics in Greenland. In 2017, she presented research on population dynamics and confidence-building in North Greenland at the International Congress of Arctic Social Sciences (ICASS) IX conference in Umeå.

From 2011 to 2017, she was a board member of the Greenland National Museum, where she worked on cultural preservation initiatives. She has also been a member of the Nordic Centre for Spatial Development, focusing on regional planning and demographic shifts in the Arctic, and has served on the Greenland Research Council.

In 2017, Reimer was appointed rector of the University of Greenland. Since assuming this role on 1 December, she has continued to contribute to research while focusing on university administration and educational development. On July 4, 2024, Reimer was awarded the Cross of the Order of Chivalry by Frederik X in recognition of her contributions to education and research in the Arctic.
