= Education in Greenland =

The levels of education in Greenland are primary, secondary and higher education. A 10-year primary education is compulsory for all children aged between 6 and 16. Education in Greenland is controlled by the Greenlandic Department of Education. Danish is taught as a second language starting in the first grade.

Following primary school, Greenlanders can choose to go to a secondary education, either in a gymnasium (a Nordic type of school similar to high school), or a vocational education. Many Greenlanders choose to leave Greenland for Denmark to continue their education, either after primary school, or gymnasium.

Greenlanders pursuing a high education can go to university in Denmark, holding the same rights as any other Danish citizen. They can also choose to stay in Greenland and pursue a higher education in the capital city of Nuuk, at the University of Greenland.

== See also ==
- Demographics of Greenland
- Indigenous education
- Education in Denmark
