= Heart of Light =

Qaamarngup uummataa
- Greenlandic theatrical poster.
- Directed by: Jacob Grønlykke
- Written by: Jacob Grønlykke, Hans Anthon Lynge
- Produced by: Henrik Møller-Sørensen
- Starring: Rasmus Lyberth
- Cinematography: Dan Laustsen
- Edited by: Wadt Thomsen
- Music by: Joachim Holbek
- Release date: 25 January 1998 (Greenland)
- Running time: 90 minutes
- Countries: Greenland; Denmark
- Languages: Greenlandic; Danish

Qaamarngup uummataa (Danish: Lysets hjerte) (English title: Heart of Light) is a 1998 Greenlandic and Danish produced drama film directed and written by Jacob Grønlykke. It is the first major production for a film to be completely shot in Greenland.

The film is about an Inuk alcoholic, who has to come to terms with his criminal son. He leaves his village and seeks recovery, and returns a new man, refreshed. One of the central themes of the film is the conflict between modernity and tradition.

== Cast ==
- Rasmus Lyberth ... Rasmus
- Vivi Nielsen ... Marie
- Nukâka Motzfeldt ... drum dancer
- Niels Platow ... Mikael Berthelsen
- Kenneth Rasmussen ... Simon
- Knud Petersen
- Laila Rasmussen ... Karina
- Agga Olsen ... Magdalene
- Jens Davidsen ... Vicar
- Henrik Larsen ... Plummer
- Søren Hauch-Fausbøll ... Bar guest
- Asger Reher ... chief of police
- Karina Skands ... Girl in tent
- Julie Carlsen ... Girl in tent
