= Nanook (band) =

Greenlandic pop-rock band

- Origin: Nuuk, Greenland
- Genres: Pop-rock, indie Rock
- Years active: 2008–present
- Labels: Atlantic Music, Mermaid
- Members: Christian K. Elsner; Frederik K. Elsner; Martin Zinck; Andreas Otte; Mads Røn
- Past members: Kim Heilmann

Nanook are a Greenlandic pop-rock band formed by brothers Christian and Frederick Elsner in 2008. The name refers to the mythological Greenlandic bear.

Nanook's lyrics are in Greenlandic. They refused an offer from Sony as the company wanted them to switch to English. Their music style is soft and melodic indie rock.

Christian and Frederick are half-Inuit and half-Danish. They are from Southern Greenland but moved to Nuuk in 2001. They run the family-owned Atlantic Music, a record company and music instrument retail store.

Nanook are Greenland's most popular band. In 2010 they sold 5,000 albums, meaning that every tenth Greenlander bought a copy.

== History ==
Nanook released their debut album, Seqinitta Qinngorpaatit ("Our sun is shining on you") in 2009. They won the "Best Album" prize at the Greenland Music Awards in 2010 and again in 2014.

They played at the Sámi music festival Riddu Riđđu in 2010, which was their first concert in Sápmi in northern Fennoscandia. They played at the festival again in 2015. They played at the Roskilde Festival in 2019.

== See also ==
- Sumé (band), Greenlandic rock band
- Music of Greenland
