= Tukuma (film) =

1984 Danish drama film

- Film poster
- Directed by: Palle Kjærulff-Schmidt
- Written by: Palle Kjærulff-Schmidt; Josef Tuusi Motzfeldt; Klaus Rifbjerg
- Starring: Thomas Eje
- Release date: 24 February 1984
- Running time: 100 minutes
- Country: Denmark
- Language: Danish

Tukuma is a 1984 Danish drama film directed by Palle Kjærulff-Schmidt. The film was selected as the Danish entry for the Best Foreign Language Film at the 57th Academy Awards, but was not accepted as a nominee.

== Cast ==
- Thomas Eje as Erik
- Naja Rosing Olsen as Sørine
- Rasmus Lyberth as Rasmus
- Benedikte Schmidt as Elizabeth
- Rasmus Thygesen as Otto

== See also ==
- List of submissions to the 57th Academy Awards for Best Foreign Language Film
- List of Danish submissions for the Academy Award for Best Foreign Language Film
