= University of Greenland =

University in Nuuk, Greenland

Coordinates: 64°11′27″N 51°41′46″W

- Ilisimatusarfik
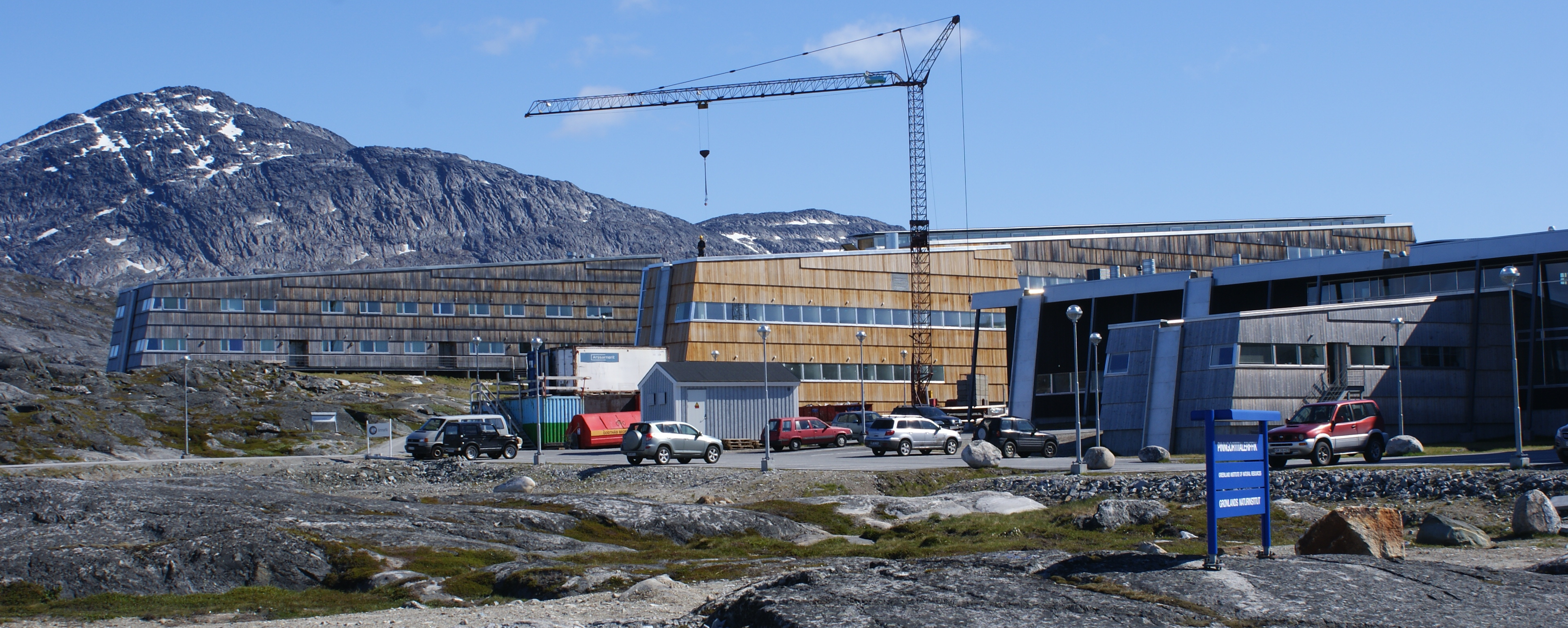
- Established: 1987
- Affiliations: UArctic
- Rector: Gitte Adler Reimer
- Faculty: 60
- Administrative staff: 115
- Students: 600
- Location: Nuuk, Greenland
- Website: uk.uni.gl

The University of Greenland (Greenlandic: Ilisimatusarfik, lit. '[The] University'; Danish: Grønlands Universitet) is Greenland's only university. It is in the capital city of Nuuk. Most courses are taught in Danish, with a few in Greenlandic, but classes by exchange lecturers are often in English.

The university had an enrollment of 205 students in 2018, composed of mostly Greenlandic inhabitants. It has around fourteen academic staff and five technical-administrative employees. The modest student population is due, in part, to most Greenlandic students going to universities in Denmark.

== History ==
The University of Greenland was established in 1987 to provide local higher education for Greenland. It was originally located in the former Moravian mission station of Neu Herrnhut, and moved into a dedicated research complex, Ilimmarfik, in 2009. The university has a DKK 14.8 million budget.

== Institutes ==
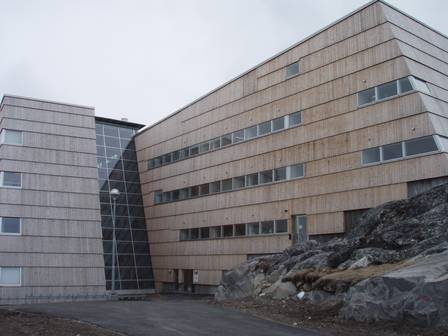
Ilimmarfik university Campus in Nuuk

The university has multiple programmes:

- Teacher training and education science (broad programmes)
- Humanities (broad programmes)
- Social and behavioural science (broad programmes)
- Business and administration (broad programmes)
- Law (broad programmes)
- Health (broad programmes)
- Social services (broad programmes)

Focus areas:

- Greenlandic culture and history
- Greenlandic political system
- Greenlandic literature and media
- Health science in the Arctic
- Climate and society

The university awards baccalaureate degrees in all departments and Master's Degrees in all areas except theology. Doctorate programmes are also offered.

== International collaboration ==
The university is an active member of the University of the Arctic. UArctic is an international cooperative network based in the Circumpolar Arctic region, consisting of more than 200 universities, colleges, and other organizations with an interest in promoting education and research in the Arctic region.The university participates in UArctic's mobility program north2north. The aim of that program is to enable students of member institutions to study in different parts of the North.

== Rector ==
Tia became director of Ilisimatusarfik at the beginning of 2009 after the former rector, Ole Marquardt, resigned in protest over new administrative laws introduced to the university in 2007. Gitte Adler Reimer assumed the role on 1 December 2017.

== Guest faculty ==
Due to the small number of faculty, many specialized classes are offered by guest faculty, often coming from Danish universities, but also coming from other countries. Guest faculty at Ilisimatusarfik are often specialists for research on Greenland, combining teaching at Ilisimatusarfik with their research while staying in Greenland.

== Library ==
The university library holds approximately 30,000 volumes.

== See also ==
- List of tribal colleges and universities
- Education in Greenland
