= Small Time Giants =

Alternative rock band from Greenland

- Origin: Qaqortoq, Greenland
- Genres: Alternative rock
- Years active: 2011-present
- Members: Miki Jensen; Pilutannguaq Hammeken; Jakob Skovaa; Jonas Lundsgaard Nilsson
- Website: www.smalltimegiants.com

Small Time Giants is an alternative rock band from Greenland. Originally formed in the 2000s under a different name by founders Miki Jensen, Jakob Skovaa, and Anda Hendriksen, the group rebranded in 2008 after relocating to Denmark for their studies, later adding members Pilutannguaq Hammeken and Jonas Lundsgaard Nilsson.

== History ==
In the 2000s, Miki Jensen, Jakob Skovaa, and Anda Hendriksen had a high school band called The Bottom of the Little Transparent Septic Tank which served as the opening act for Chilly Friday at a concert in Qaqortoq in 2006. Pilutannguaq Hammeken joined the band that same year. In 2007, Miki Jensen moved to Denmark to study, and the rest of the band members followed in 2008. They then changed their name to Small Time Giants, a reference to the musicians' small stature. In 2011, Dane Jonas Lundsgaard Nilsson joined the band, while Anda Hendriksen left in 2012.

In February 2012, the band released their debut EP, Six Shades of Heart , which reached number 1 on the Danish iTunes Store. In 2013, the band received the Koda Awards Talent Award for their EP . In 2014, the album Stethoscope , produced by Danish musician Søren Balsner, was released. The song "We Are the Arctic" became the theme song for the 2016 Arctic Winter Games. The music is described as international post-rock with English lyrics, the content of which clearly refers to Greenland. Miki Jensen once cited Chilly Friday and Kurt Cobain / Nirvana as influences.

Besides Greenland, the band is popular in Denmark where it has developed a following with their mainly English-language songs. Their EP Six Shades of Heart was released in February 2012 and their debut studio album Stethoscope was released on DIGIDI, the digital distribution network in October 2014. In 2015, the band won the contest for the official song of the Arctic Winter Games, which was held in Nuuk, Greenland in 2016. The song, entitled "We Are the Arctic", was formally released in October 2015.

The band released the Christmas-themed single "Angerlarlanga" on December 12, 2016. The song reached No. 1 on the Danish iTunes chart that month.

== Discography ==
=== Albums ===
Year	Album	Peak positions	Certification
Year	Album	DEN	Certification
2014	Stethoscope	39	
2020	Formed by Mistakes		

== EPs ==
- 2012: Six Shades of Heart

== Album ==
- 2014: Stethoscope
- 2020: Formed by Mistakes
