= Troaking =

Trade between Greenlanders and Scottish whalers

Troaking was the barter between the natives of Greenland and whalers from ports in Scotland.

From the signing of the Treaty of Kiel in 1814 until the occupation of Denmark by Nazi Germany in 1940, Greenland was a protected and very isolated society. The Danish government, which governed Greenland as its colony, had been convinced that this society would face exploitation from the outside world or even extinction if the country was opened up, and thus it maintained a strict monopoly of Greenland's economy barring any trading or fishing within a certain distance of the Greenlandic coast. It did not, however, prohibit the sale of small articles not used in their trade, thus creating a loophole that enabled the practice of troaking, a barter between the natives and the Scottish whalers.
