= Kerstin Behrendtz =

Swedish radio presenter (1950–2020)

- Born: Clary Kerstin Margareta Behrendtz; 18 August 1950; Stockholm, Sweden
- Died: 28 March 2020 (aged 69); Stockholm, Sweden
- Spouse: Thomas Samuelsson
- Presenting career
- Show: Jukeboxen
- Station: Sveriges Radio
- Country: Sweden

Clary Kerstin Margareta Behrendtz (briefly Behrendtz Samuelsson; 18 August 1950 – 28 March 2020) was a Swedish radio presenter and director of music for Sveriges Radio's programmes.

== Biography ==
She worked for Sveriges Radio, where she worked as a director who selected songs to be played in the radio stations programmes. She retired on 31 August 2017. On 7 October 2017, Behrendtz presented Jukeboxen on Sveriges Radio P4. She was part of the selection committee that decided what songs would take part in Melodifestivalen 2014. She was also part of the selection committee for the Swedish Music Hall of Fame from 2014 until her death. On 31 August 2017, she retired.

Behrendtz was between 1972 and 1977, married to film director Thomas Samuelsson and they had two children together.

Behrendtz died on 28 March 2020, after suffering from COVID-19. She is buried in Danderyd's cemetery.
