= History of the Jews in Greenland =

Greenlandic Jews Grønlandske Jøder Kalaallit Juutit יהודים גרינלנדים
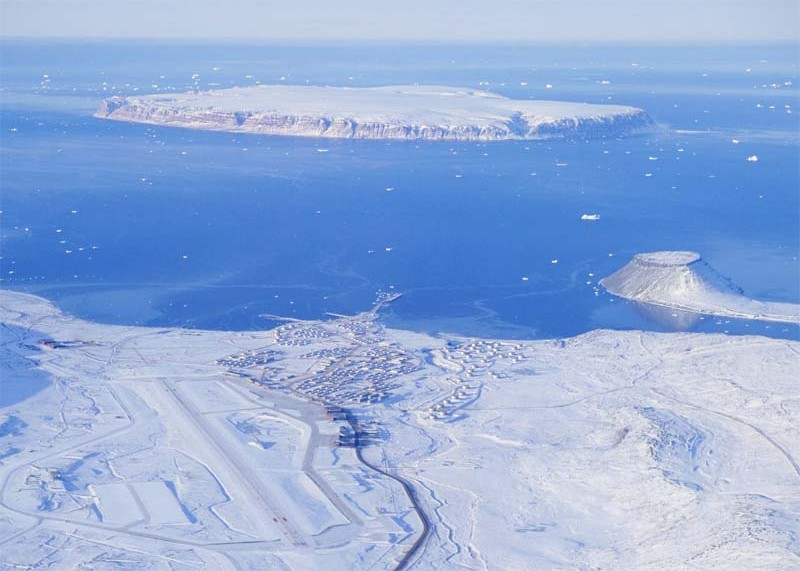
- Thule Air Base (now the Pituffik Space Base) in 2005

Total population
- 1

Regions with significant populations
- Nuuk, Narsaq, Qaanaaq

Languages
- English, Danish, Greenlandic, German, Hebrew

Religion
- Judaism

Related ethnic groups
- Danish Jews, American Jews, German Jews

Greenland does not have an organized Jewish community. Out of a population of 56,789 people in 2024, there was only one Jew. However, Jews have lived there temporarily, among them Danish Jewish soldiers, American Jewish soldiers, Israeli Navy members, and members of the Israeli Air Force.

== History ==
Before 2001, there had never been a permanent Jewish community in Greenland, though Jewish fishermen were known to frequent the island's waters.

=== Early modern period (16th to 17th centuries) ===
Icelandic-born historian Vilhjálmur Örn Vilhjálmsson writes in his book Antisemitism in the North that "there were certainly Jews among the first Dutch whalers in the 16th and 17th centuries."

=== Late modern period (20th century) ===
In the 1920s, Alfred Wegener, who discovered continental drift, came to Greenland with his friend and fellow meteorologist Fritz Loewe, who was Jewish. Loewe got frostbite while trying to reach the center of Greenland. Loewe's team had to amputate his toes with scissors.

After the German occupation of Denmark on 9 April 1940, Henrik Kauffmann, Danish Ambassador to the United States, made an agreement "In the name of the king" with the United States, authorizing the United States to defend the Danish colonies on Greenland from German aggression. In 1941, the United States, built an air base at Thule. During World War II, Jewish servicemen in the country received visits from military chaplains, with support from the National Jewish Welfare Board. In the fall of 1942, Rabbi Julius Amos Leibert, an Army Chaplain educated at Reform seminary HUC-JIR, conducted High Holiday services in Greenland, Labrador, and Iceland. Rabbi Harold Gordon served the North Atlantic Air Transport Command and visited Greenland as part of his circuit. Other U.S. chaplains serving Greenland during World War II included Rabbis Jeshaia Schnitzer, Albert A. Goldman, and Israel Miller.

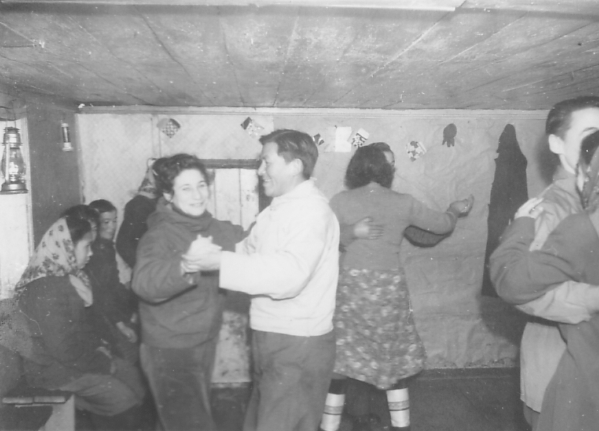
Rita Scheftelowitz (in black hair, looking towards camera), dancing with Golo, her Greenlandic interpreter

In the 1950s, there were more than 50 Jewish servicemen stationed in the Thule Air Base at one time. Inside the air base, Shabbat services, Passover Seders, and prayers for the Jewish High Holidays were held. As a result, Vilhjálmsson writes, Thule has had "the northernmost minyan in the world."

Vilhjálmsson's impressions of Jewish life at Thule in the 1950s are drawn in part from the memoirs of Alfred J. Fischer, a German-born journalist who traveled to the country with his wife in 1955. Fischer also wrote in a manuscript of a trip to Aasiaat, where he met nurse Rita Scheftelowitz, whose family had sought refuge from Denmark in Sweden during the war, moved from Denmark to Greenland for adventure. Scheftelowitz lived an Orthodox Jewish life there. She was able to eat kosher by avoiding meat, and eating the fish that was plentiful in the nearby water.

=== Contemporary era (21st century) ===
Currently, the airbase is being used as a base for space exploration, and has been renamed to the Pituffik Space Base in 2023. The sole Jewish resident of Greenland, Paul Cohen, has been living in the city of Narsaq since 2001, and works as a translator. Despite his remoteness, he says that Jewish tourists are always able to find him.

Cohen and his wife, Monika, also run a property rental business in Narsaq, consisting of two summer cottages that can sleep a total of eight people. They do most of the renovations and repairs themselves.

== See also ==
- Religion in Greenland
- History of the Jews in Denmark
