= Drum dance =

Dance in which drums play an important role

Dances centered around drums are performed in many cultures. Anthropologists sometimes refer to these as "drum dances". Drum dances may have various kinds of spiritual or social significance.

== Kalahari Desert ==
Anthropologist Richard Katz reports on a drum dance that the !Kung people in the Kalahari Desert perform. In !Kung, the dance is called !Gwah tsi. The dance takes a few hours. Women dancers form a horseshoe shape around a male drummer. The dancers may experience a spiritual sensation called kia while they dance.

== North America ==
=== Dene and Slavey ===
When Dene drum dances are performed, the performers aim to get their audience to dance. If everyone in the audience gets up, the style of music changes. At some point in the cycle, the drummers stop drumming and the audience and performers sing and dance together.

Slavey perform a drum dance led by a group of frame drum players. The Slavey drum dance has components including the tea dance and round dance.

=== Haudenosaunee ===
As of 1985, a drum dance was performed on the Six Nations of the Grand River. It was led by a drum player, who also sang, assisted by a horn rattle performer. Anthropologist Gertrude Prokosch Kurath watched drum dances at the Six Nations reserve and reported that the dance had four major parts: (1) an introduction, (2) the procession of dancers into the longhouse followed by singing, (3) a set of chants and prayers, and (4) a recapitulation of part 2, the singing phase.

=== Innu ===
Innu drum dances or circle dances are called innuniminanu. Innuniminanu are performed with only one drummer.

=== Inuit ===
Drum dance in Gjoa Haven, Nunavut, Canada, 2019

The drum dance and throat singing are two traditional forms of Inuit music. Inuit drum dance songs, or pisiq, are typically based on a five-note scale. They usually have a strophic form. The drum played during the Inuit drum dance is called a qilaut. Copper Inuit use the drum dance "to honour members of the family, to express gratitude, and to welcome and bid farewell to visitors". Jean-Jacques Nattiez describes a drum dance in Igloolik as an "endurance competition" in which performers are tested on their recall of songs and ability to keep performing as long as possible.

=== Ojibwe ===
The drum used for Ojibwe drum dances, sometimes called the "dream drum", has been considered sacred. It may be treated as a living thing.

A story says that the dance drum was brought by a Sioux woman called Tailfeather Woman or Turkey Tailfeather Woman to the Ojibwe. According to the ethnomusicologist Thomas Vennum, this story is accurate and the events it describes likely occurred in the 1870s. Elaine Keillor says the date was 1877.

Several anthropologists agree that the Ojibwe drum dance, rooted in this origin story, derives from the grass dance. Vennum uses the word "society" to describe the groups that perform the grass and drum dances. Drum dance societies are composed of a drum owner, singers, and others.

=== Tłı̨chǫ ===
Tłı̨chǫ drum dances, called Eye t'a dagowo, happen at nighttime. Dancers move clockwise, single file, in a circle.

=== Yup'ik and Iñupiat ===
Yup'ik and Iñupiat drum dances are composed of repeated musical phrases. The drum played in these dances is called a suayaq or kilaun. Nicole Beaudry, describing a Yup'ik drum dance she saw in Alaska in the late 1980s, says that there were four or five drummers who sat together on a bench, singing, surrounded by dancers. Sometimes, a drummer who wanted to dance would be replaced by one of the surrounding dancers.

== Papua New Guinea ==
Anthropologist Nancy Munn describes a drum dance done on Gawa Island, one of the Marshall Bennett Islands. The dance is generally held nightly at some point in the year. It is a way for young people to meet potential sexual partners. The dance occurs around a tree called the dabedeba tree; drummers and singers stand there when the dance is going on.

== Sources ==
- Elliott, Robin; Smith, Gordon E. (19 April 2010). Music Traditions, Cultures, and Contexts. Wilfrid Laurier University Press. ISBN 978-1-55458-199-3.
- Keillor, Elaine (2006). Music in Canada: Capturing Landscape and Diversity. McGill–Queen's University Press. ISBN 0-7735-3177-7. OCLC 65206128.
- Kurath, Gertrude Prokosch (1968). Dance and Song Rituals of Six Nations Reserve, Ontario. Ottawa: Queen's Printer. OCLC 1148819048. National Museum of Canada Bulletin No. 220, Folklore Series No. 4.
- McGee, Timothy J. (1985). The Music of Canada. W. W. Norton & Company. ISBN 0-393-02279-X. OCLC 11519747.
- Vennum, Thomas (2009) [1982]. The Ojibwa Dance Drum: Its History and Construction. Minnesota Historical Society Press. ISBN 978-0-87351-642-6. OCLC 263605528.
