= Siissisoq =

Greenlandic heavy metal band

- Origin: Uummannaq, Greenland
- Genres: Hard rock; jazz metal
- Years active: 1994–present
- Past members: Karl Enok Mathiassen; Hans Mathiassen; Knud Mathiassen; Malik Løvstrøm; Ilannguaq Mathiassen; Hans Therkildsen; Jens Samuelsen; Villads Kristiansen; Peter Fleischer; Jens Thorin; Peter Hendriksen; Rasmus Petersen

Siissisoq was a Greenlandic heavy metal band, formed in 1994. The name Siissisoq means Rhino in Greenlandic. The band's lyrics are sung in Greenlandic and their songs are mainly named after African animals. During their original incarnation they were considered the most popular rock band in Greenland.

== History ==
Siissisoq formed in 1994 in their hometown of Uummannaq. Guitarist Karl Enok Mathiassen started writing riffs inspired by Metallica and White Zombie. Guitarist Jens Thorin was the first additional member of the new band. Karl Enok Mathiassen started writing songs at age 15, and several of his early songs ended up on the first Siissisoq album.

They released their first album, Aammarpassuillu, in 1998, and it stayed at number one on the Greenlandic charts for two months. In 2001, the band released the live album Aammarlussuillu Live. Their second studio album Super Day was released in 2002 but was not as successful as the first album. The band then went on an extended hiatus.

Siissisoq learned that their record label, ULO Records, had engaged in fraud and manipulation and only paid the band 3-4% of the income earned from their work. ULO claimed that there was not enough of a profit to give Siissisoq money.

The band played reunion shows in 2010 at the Nuuk Festival and the Nipiaa Rock Festival, and have performed live sporadically since then. The album Black Box, compiling live tracks and new recordings of older songs, was released in 2018. Today Karl Enok Mathiassen has his own record label and radio company.

== Past members ==
- Karl Enok Mathiassen - Lead Guitar, songwriting
- Hans Mathiassen - Vocals, bass guitar
- Knud Mathiassen - Vocals
- Malik Løvstrøm - Drums
- Ilannguaq Mathiassen - Guitar
- Hans Therkildsen - Bass
- Jens Samuelsen - Vocals
- Villads Kristiansen - Drums
- Peter Fleischer - Drums
- Jens Thorin - Guitar
- Peter Hendriksen - Bass
- Rasmus Petersen - Bass
- Jens Koch Kristensen - Bass

== Discography ==
- Aammarpassuillu (1998)
- Aammarpassuillu Live (2001)
- Super Day (2002)
- Black Box (compilation, 2018)
- Nilliaannarit (2021)
- Q (2023)
- Superday (compilation, 2023)
