= Nuuk Posse =

Greenlandic hip-hop group

Nuuk Posse is a hip hop group from Greenland. The group, whose members are Inuit, formed in 1985 under a different name, finally taking the name Nuuk Posse in 1991. Nuuk Posse is multilingual, rapping in Kalaallisut, English, and Danish.

The group's members include Andreas Hojgaard (human beatbox), Lars Sørensen (rap), Peter Motzfeldt (rap, music), Henrik Pedersen (rap), Thomas Hansen (rap), and John Olsen (rap, lyrics). They released their first single, "Sussa Appinnagu" in 1992. Their first album, NP, was released in 1995. In 1996 they released their album Kaataq through the Belgian label Sub Rosa.

Nuuk Posse has toured in various countries, including Sweden, Germany, Spain, Belgium, and Canada, but never in Denmark. The group were awarded the cultural prize of Greenland in 1995, and they were nominated as "Messengers of Truth" by the United Nations in 2004.
