= Rasmus Lyberth =

Greenlandic musician(born 1951)

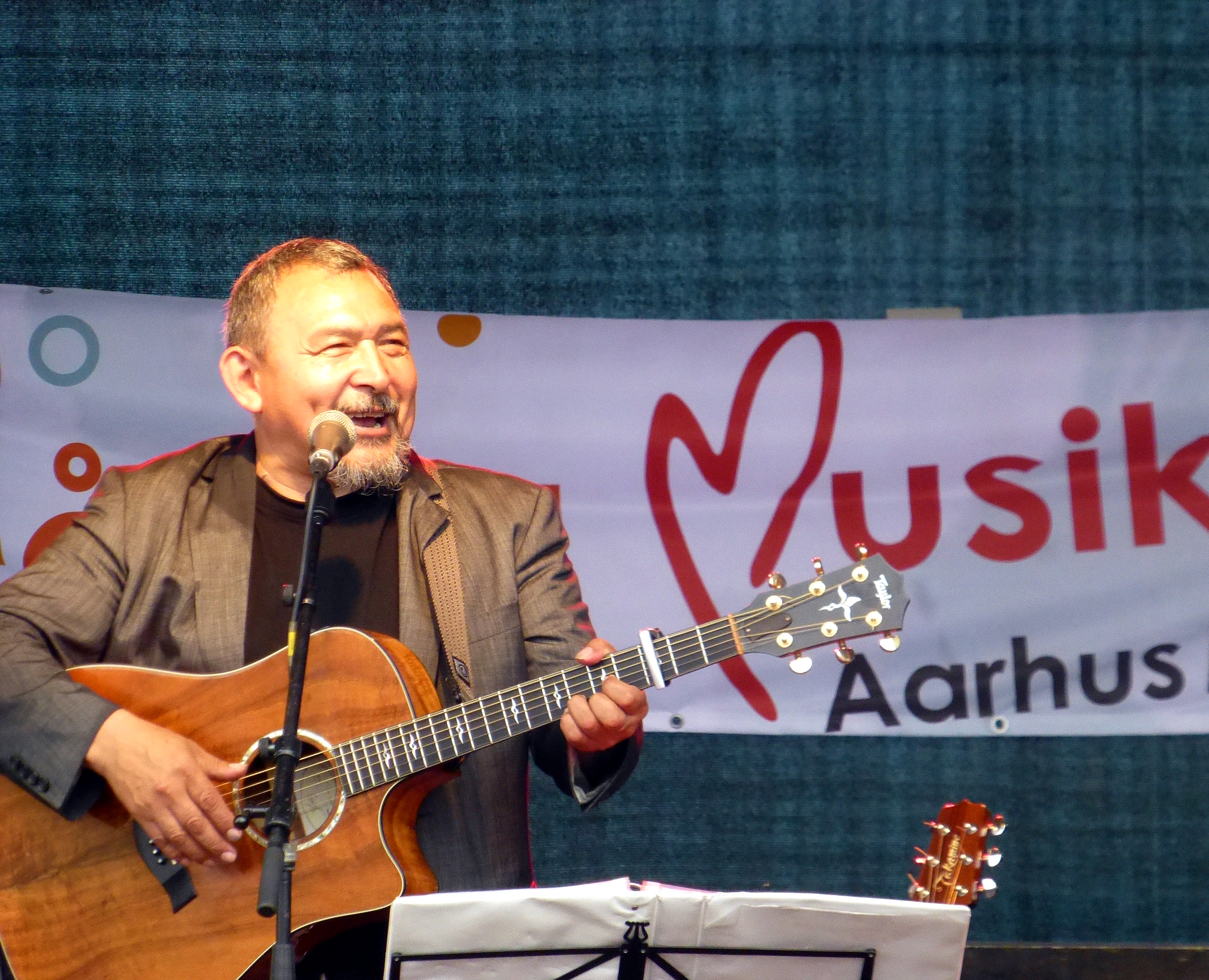
- Rasmus Lyberth. A concert during the Tall Ships' Races in Aarhus, July 4. 2013

Background information
- Born: Rasmus Ole Lyberth; 21 August 1951 (age 75); Maniitsoq, Greenland
- Occupations: Musician; actor
- Instruments: Vocals; guitar
- Years active: 1969–present
- Website: www.rasmuslyberth.com

Rasmus Ole Lyberth (born 21 August 1951) is a Greenlandic-Danish musician and actor. Since 1970, he has been one of the most popular artists in the Greenlandic music scene. His music is well known beyond the borders of Greenland.

== Biography ==
Rasmus Lyberth was born in Maniitsoq, but grew up in Nuuk, where as a 12-year-old he began performing and playing the guitar. He is the son of a teacher and writer Erik Lyberth and Emma Lyberth. In 1969 he began performing in Copenhagen. In 1974 he recorded his first album, Erningaa.

Erningaa was successful and was followed by his second album, Piumassuseq nukiuvoq, at which point he went on hiatus. He also appeared on the stage of the Greenlandic Tuukaq Teatret, and gave many concerts not only in Denmark and Greenland, but also in many countries in Europe and North America. He has collaborated with other musicians, including Christian Alvad and Lars Lilholt Band.

In 1979 he participated in the Dansk Melodi Grand Prix, performing second on the night with 'Faders bøn' ('Father's Prayer') in Greenlandic, and placing 11th out of 17 entries.)

== Discography ==
- 1974: Erningaa
- 1978: Piumassuseq nukiuvoq (dan. Viljen er styrke)
- 1989: Ajorpianng
- 1989: Nanivaat
- 1992: Kisimiinngilatit (Kærlighed gør mig smuk)
- 1994: Nakuussutigaara
- 1998: Qaamaneq isinnit isigaara (Jeg ser lysglimt i dine øjne)
- 2001: Inuuneq oqaluttuartaraanngat (Når livet fortæller)
- 2006: Asanaqigavit (Kærligst)
- 2019:Inuunerup Oqarifgaanga(Livet skal leves på ny)

== Filmography ==
- 1984: Tukuma
- 1998: Heart of Light, (Greenlandic Qaamarngup uummataa, dan. Lysets hjerte)
- 2003, 2008: Nissernes Ø (TV-Serie)
