= Chilly Friday =

Rock band from Greenland

- Origin: Nuuk, Greenland
- Genres: Rock, hard rock, indie rock
- Years active: 2000–present
- Members: Malik Kleist; Henrik Møller Jensen; Alex Andersen; Angunnguaq Larsen

Chilly Friday is a rock band from Greenland formed on a Friday in 2000, and deriving their name thereof, the band originates from Nuuk. To date they have released seven albums. Even though some of the album titles are in Greenlandic, the songs' lyrics are in both Greenlandic and English. After several years of pause, Chilly Friday gave a comeback concert in Nuuk on September 4, 2015, celebrating the band's 15-year anniversary.

== Origins ==
Formed on a Friday in 2000, and deriving their name thereof, the band originates from Nuuk, and is arguably the most successful Greenlandic rock orchestra to date. Presently the band is located in Copenhagen, mostly due to logistical reasons. According to their web site the band labels its music "Rock from the Great White Pearl", referring to their home country.

To date they have released seven albums. Even though some of the album titles are in Greenlandic, the songs' lyrics are in both Greenlandic and English. The album M/S Kalaallit Nunaat is sung entirely in Greenlandic. Additionally, the 2004 album Tribute contains topical, pro-independence Greenlandic songs from the 1970s to the 1980s associated with the Home Rule Movement.

After several years of pause, Chilly Friday gave a comeback concert in Nuuk on September 4, 2015, celebrating the band's 15-year anniversary.

== Band members ==
- Malik Kleist, singer
- Henrik Møller Jensen, bass
- Alex Andersen, drums
- Angunnguaq Larsen, guitar

== Discography ==
- Inuiaat 2000 (2000)
- Saamimmiit Talerpianut (2001)
- Remix (2001)
- Eskimo Weekend - Soundtrack (2002)
- Arctic Horizons - Arctic Winter Games (2002)
- Tribute (2004)
- M/S Kalaallit Nunaat (2005)
