= Sumé (band) =

Greenlandic rock band

- Origin: Sorø, Sjælland, Denmark
- Genres: Psychedelic rock; progressive rock; folk rock
- Years active: 1972–1977
- Labels: Demos, ULO
- Past members: Malik Høegh; Per Berthelsen; Hans Fleischer; Hjelmar Dahl; Emil Larsen; Sakio Nielsen; Karl Sivertsen; Nikolaj Steenstrup; Erik Hammeken

Cover of the album Sumut, depicting a 19th-century woodcut of an Inuk having killed a Norseman

Sumé (meaning "where?" in Greenlandic) was a Greenlandic rock band considered the pioneers of Greenlandic rock music. It was formed in 1972 by musicians Malik Høegh and Per Berthelsen and widely credited with sparking a movement for cultural independence from Denmark. The song was sung entirely in Greenlandic.

Their 1973 debut album, Sumut ("Where to?"), featured a provocative historical woodcut of an Inuk hunter defeating a Norseman and was purchased by an astonishing 20 percent of Greenland's population. Though the band dissolved in 1977, they reunited occasionally and released the album Persersume in 1994. Their history was filmed for the documentary Sumé: The Sound of a Revolution, directed by Inuk Silis Høegh.

== History ==
They were formed in 1972 by singer, guitarist and composer Malik Høegh (born 1952), and guitarist, singer and composer Per Berthelsen. Their first record Sumut ("where to?") was released in 1973 on the Danish Demos label and was purchased by 20 percent of the Greenlandic population, becoming an important part of the Greenlandic movement for cultural independence from Denmark. The band was inspired by American rock, but sang in the Greenlandic language and their lyrics were progressive and critical of the Danish colonial power. In the song "Nunaqarfiit" they sang "It is time to live again as Inuit and not as Westerners". The cover of the 1973 record Sumut showed a reproduction of a 19th-century woodcut by Aron of Kangeq depicting an Inuk hunter killing a Norseman.

The band was dissolved in 1977 but they still perform occasionally, and in 1994 they released the record Persersume ("Snowdrift").

== Legacy ==
There is 2014 documenter who record about their band with titled Sumé: the sound of a revolution, directed by Inuk Silis Høegh.

== Discography ==
- Sumut (1973, Demos)
- Inuit Nunaat (1974, Demos)
- Sume (1977, ULO)
- 1973-76 (1988, ULO)
- Persersume (1994, ULO)
