= Olga P. Berthelsen =

Greenlandic politician

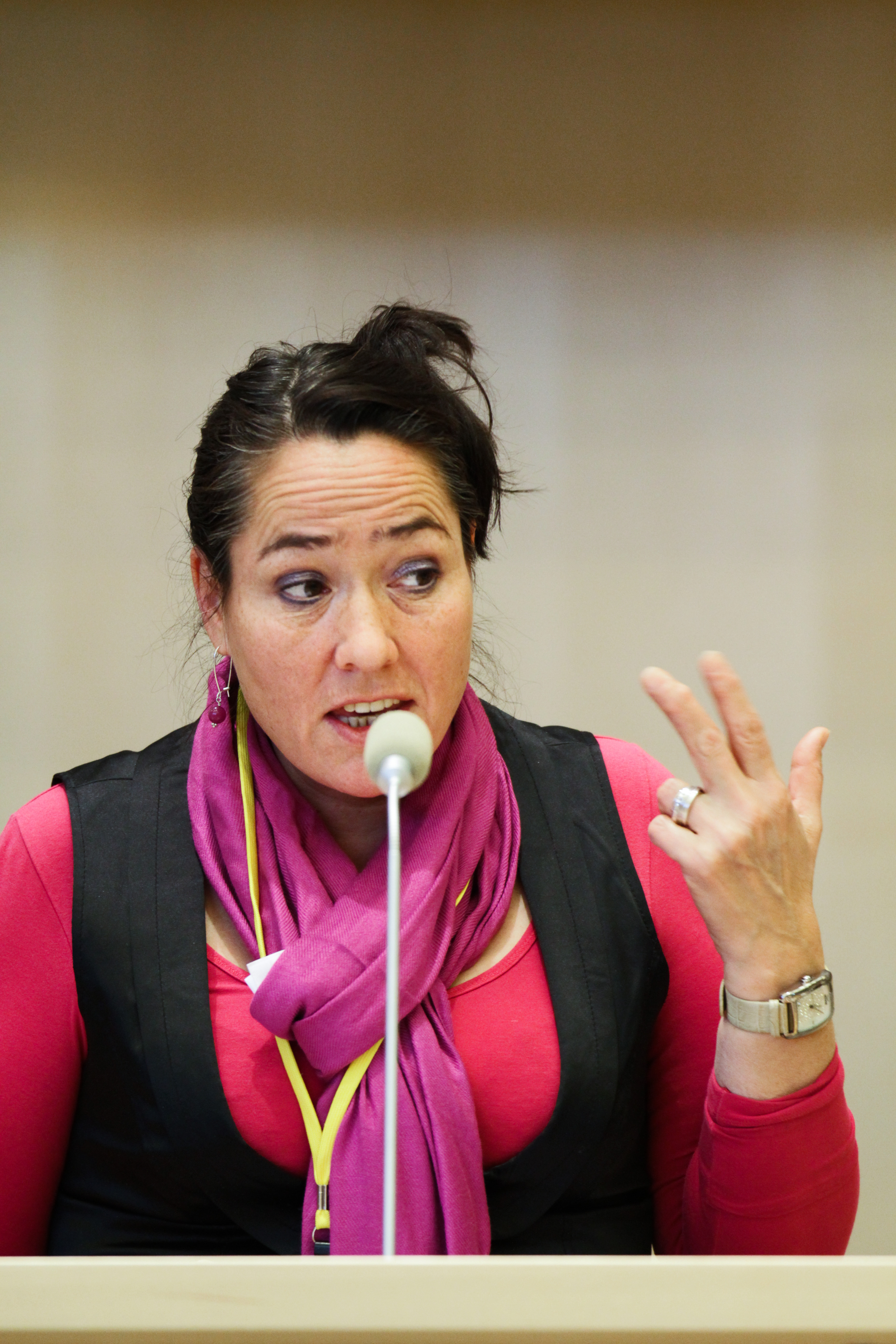
- Berthelsen in 2009

Member of the Greenlandic Parliament
- In office 1999–2002
- In office 2005–2007
- In office 2009–2013

Personal details
- Born: Greenland
- Citizenship: Kingdom of Denmark
- Party: Inuit Ataqatigiit (IA)

Olga Poulsen Berthelsen (née Poulsen) is a Greenlandic politician (Inuit Ataqatigiit).

== Early life and career ==
Berthelsen is the daughter of Ane D. Poulsen. In her younger years she worked as an office clerk and as a teacher before she began training as a nurse in 1994.

== Political career ==
Berthelsen ran for the first time in the 1991 general election, but was not elected to the Inatsisartut. She also wasn't elected in the 1995 election. In March 1996, she became a deputy member of the Nuuk Municipality Council. In the 1999 general election, she was elected to the Inatsisartut for the first time. She did not stand for the 2002 election and also left the municipal council. In the 2005 general election, she was the first candidate for the Inuit Ataqatigiit and sat in the Inatsisartut from there until June 2007. In October 2007 she briefly became a deputy member again and finally again from September 2008. In the 2009 election she was re-elected directly to the Inatsisartut. Four years later, in the 2013 election, she failed to get enough votes and left parliament. She ran again in the 2018 election, but again was not elected.

== Personal life ==
Berthelsen is married to the Greenlandic union leader Jess G. Berthelsen (b. 1958) and they have five children.
