= 2008 Greenlandic local elections =

- 2008
- 4 municipal councils
| Party | Leader | Vote % | Seats | +/– |
|---|---|---|---|---|
| Siumut | | 37.7 | 30 | −42 |
| Inuit Ataqatigiit | | 26.8 | 21 | −15 |
| Atassut | | 15.4 | 10 | −26 |
| Democrats | | 13.4 | 8 | −6 |
| Kattusseqatigiit | | 4.6 | 2 | New |
| K2 | | | 1 | 0 |
This lists parties that won seats. See the complete results below.

The 2008 Greenlandic local elections saw the governing Siumut win the most votes and seats.

== Results ==
| Party | Votes | % | Seats | +/– |
|---|---|---|---|---|
| Siumut | 9,245 | 38.10 | 30 | –42 |
| Inuit Ataqatigiit | 6,590 | 27.16 | 21 | –15 |
| Atassut | 3,769 | 15.53 | 10 | –26 |
| Democrats | 3,285 | 13.54 | 8 | –6 |
| Association of Candidates | 1,137 | 4.69 | 2 | New |
| K2 | 128 | 0.53 | 1 | 0 |
| K1 | 74 | 0.31 | 0 | –8 |
| Independents | 34 | 0.14 | 0 | New |
| Total | 24,262 | 100.00 | 72 | – |
| Valid votes | 24,262 | 98.84 | | |
| Invalid/blank votes | 284 | 1.16 | | |
| Total votes | 24,546 | 100.00 | | |
| Registered voters/turnout | 39,644 | 61.92 | | |
