= 2005 Greenlandic general election =

← 2002	22 November 2005	2009 →
- All 31 seats in the Inatsisartut; 16 seats needed for a majority
- Turnout: 74.86% (▼0.27 pp)
Party	Leader	Vote %	Seats	+/–
Siumut	Hans Enoksen	30.68	10	0
Democrats	Per Berthelsen	22.83	7	+2
Inuit Ataqatigiit	Josef Motzfeldt	22.56	7	−1
Atassut	Finn Karlsen	19.14	6	−1
Kattusseqatigiit	Anthon Frederiksen	4.05	1	0
This lists parties that won seats. See the complete results below.
Results by municipality
Prime Minister before	Prime Minister after
Hans Enoksen; Siumut	Hans Enoksen; Siumut

General elections were held in Greenland on 22 November 2005. The result was a victory for Siumut, whose leader Hans Enoksen remained Prime Minister.

== Results ==
Party	Votes	%	Seats	+/–
Siumut	8,861	30.68	10	0
Democrats	6,595	22.83	7	+2
Inuit Ataqatigiit	6,516	22.56	7	–1
Atassut	5,528	19.14	6	–1
Association of Candidates	1,169	4.05	1	New
Independents	216	0.75	0	–1
Total	28,885	100.00	31	0
Valid votes	28,885	99.13		
Invalid/blank votes	254	0.87		
Total votes	29,139	100.00		
Registered voters/turnout	38,924	74.86		
Source: Qinersineq
