= Marie Fleischer =

Greenlandic businesswoman and politician (born 1980)

Member of the Greenlandic Parliament
- In office 2002–2009

Personal details
- Born: 3 June 1980 (age 46) Uummannaq, Greenland
- Citizenship: Kingdom of Denmark
- Party: Inuit Ataqatigiit (2008-09); Democrats (until 2008)

Marie Kathrine Fleischer (born 3 June 1980) is a Greenlandic businesswoman and former politician affiliated with Democrats and later Inuit Ataqatigiit.

== Early and personal life ==
Marie Fleischer is the daughter of official Hans Peter Fleischer (d. 1993) and the economic consultant Grete Street. She attended the University of Greenland, where she received a business diploma in organization and management. On 3 August 2013, she married police officer Knud Frederiksen (b. 1976), with whom she has a son born in 2008.

== Political career ==
Fleischer ran for the newly founded Democrats in the 2002 general election, and was elected to the Inatsisartut at the age of 22. She was re-elected in the 2005 election. In 2007, she was elected local chairwoman of Democrats in Nuuk. In May 2008, she left Democrats and became a non-affiliated MP. From then on, she cooperated with the Inuit Ataqatigiit without being a party member.[5] She only joined the party in December 2008.

== Business career ==
Fleischer did not run in the 2009 parliamentary election. Instead, she became director of the Sermersooq Municipality's Acquisition Council. In 2013, she was hired as municipal director for public services. During this time, she continued her education. In 2015, she received a master's degree in business administration from Aalborg University and in 2017 she became cand.scient.adm. from the University of Greenland. In 2017, she was appointed director of the airport company Mittarfeqarfiit. She resigned from the position in 2019.

Fleischer was a board member of Royal Greenland from 2010 to 2014, including vice-chairman from 2012. In 2017, she became a board member of Rotary International in Nuuk and in the same year a board member of Nuup Bussii and the urban development company Siorarsiorfik (Nuuk City Development).
