= 2002 Greenlandic general election =

← 1999	3 December 2002	2005 →
- All 31 seats in the Inatsisartut; 16 seats needed for a majority
- Turnout: 74.59% (▼1.41 pp)
Party	Leader	Vote %	Seats	+/–
Siumut	Hans Enoksen	28.80%	10	−1
Inuit Ataqatigiit	Josef Motzfeldt	25.59%	8	+1
Atassut	Augusta Salling	20.42%	7	−1
Democrats	Per Berthelsen	16.10%	5	New
Kattusseqatigiit	Anthon Frederiksen	5.34%	1	−3
This lists parties that won seats. See the complete results below.
Results by municipality
Prime Minister before	Prime Minister after
Jonathan Motzfeldt; Siumut	Hans Enoksen; Siumut

General elections were held in Greenland on 3 December 2002. The result was victory for the Siumut party, which won 10 of the 31 seats in the Parliament.

== Results ==
Party	Votes	%	Seats	+/–
Siumut	8,151	28.80	10	–1
Inuit Ataqatigiit	7,244	25.59	8	+1
Atassut	5,780	20.42	7	–1
Democrats	4,558	16.10	5	New
Association of Candidates	1,510	5.34	1	–3
Women's Party	686	2.42	0	New
Independents	374	1.32	0	–1
Total	28,303	100.00	31	0
Valid votes	28,303	98.91		
Invalid/blank votes	313	1.09		
Total votes	28,616	100.00		
Registered voters/turnout	38,365	74.59		
Source: Greenland Statistics, Election Passport
