= Kuupik Kleist =

Prime Minister of Greenland from 2009 to 2013

Kuupik Vandersee Kleist
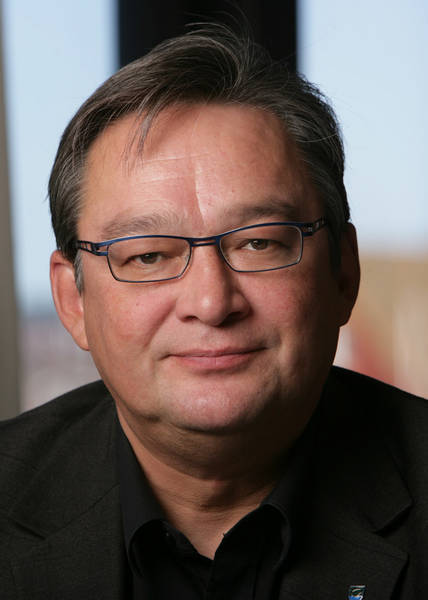
- Kleist in 2008

Prime Minister of Greenland
- In office 12 June 2009 – 5 April 2013
- Monarch: Margrethe II
- Preceded by: Hans Enoksen
- Succeeded by: Aleqa Hammond

Chairman of the OCT for Greenland
- In office 23 January 2012 – 25 September 2012
- Deputy: Jens B. Frederiksen

Leader of the Inuit Ataqatigiit
- In office 10 June 2007 – 31 March 2014
- Deputy: Aqqaluaq B. Egede
- Preceded by: Josef Motzfeldt
- Succeeded by: Sara Olsvig

Member of the Greenlandic Parliament
- Incumbent
- Assumed office 8 February 2002

Member of the Danish Parliament
- In office 20 November 2001 – 13 November 2007

Member of the Greenlandic Parliament
- In office 1995–1996

Minister of Public Works and Transport
- In office 1991–1995
- Prime Minister: Lars Emil Johansen

Personal details
- Born: Jakob Edvard Kuupik Kleist; 31 March 1958 (age 68) Qullissat, County of Greenland, Denmark
- Citizenship: Kingdom of Denmark
- Party: Inuit Ataqatigiit
- Spouse: Aviaaja Vandersee (m. 2012)
- Children: 5
- Relatives: Makka Kleist (cousin)
- Education: University of Roskilde
- Website: ia.gl/kuupik-kleist

Jakob Edvard Kuupik Kleist (born 31 March 1958) is a Greenlandic politician who served as the prime minister of Greenland between 2009 and 2013. A member of the Inuit Ataqatigiit party, he was the first prime minister not affiliated with Siumut.

Since 2018, he has served as the first chairman of the Arctic Indigenous Film Fund.

== Early life and career ==
Kleist was born on 31 March 1958 to a Danish telegraphist and a Greenlandic mother in Qullissat on Disko Island, and was raised by his aunt and uncle. He attended primary school in Qullissat from 1966 until 1972 when the mining town was abandoned and then he attended lower secondary school in Sisimiut until 1975. When he was 17, he was sent to Denmark, alone and with no prior knowledge of Danish. He attended the Birkerød State School in Denmark from 1975 to 1978. Kleist graduated from Roskilde University in 1983 with a master's degree in social work (socionom). He taught journalism in Nuuk from 1988 to 1991.

== Political career ==
In 1996, Kleist was appointed the Director of the Foreign Office of the Greenland Home Rule Government (Direktør for hjemmestyrets udenrigskontor). He was a Member of the Danish Parliament from 20 November 2001 to 13 November 2007, representing the Inuit Ataqatigiit (IA) party. IA will be the first party to govern the autonomous Danish territory under an expanded home rule agreement known as "self-rule" (selvstyre). While the self-rule agreement has been referred to a step towards eventual full independence from Denmark, Kleist's administration was predicted to put "any push for independence [...] on the backburner", given his pledge to focus on social issues such as alcoholism, domestic violence and a high suicide rate.

Kleist had risen to power on an agenda that included cleaning up following government scandals.

=== Prime minister ===
Since 2007, he has been the leader of IA, a leftist political party which works towards Greenland's eventual full autonomy from Denmark. The party received the most votes in the 2009 election. In June 2009 the Greenlandic parliament therefore elected Kleist the fifth Prime Minister of Greenland. Kleist also had a very successful election himself and won 5,461 personal votes compared to just 1,413 votes for incumbent Prime Minister Hans Enoksen.

In late August 2009 Kleist met with Admiral Tim Sloth Jørgensen and General Walter Natynczyk, the chiefs of defense staff for Denmark and Canada, respectively. Admiral Jørgensen and General Natynczyk were conducting a tour of Danish and Canadian military bases in the Arctic.

== See also ==
- Greenlandic independence

== Footnotes ==
Biography

- Autobiography on the website of the Danish Parliament (Folketinget)
