= 2007 Danish general election =

- 13 November 2007
- All 179 seats in the Folketing; 90 seats needed for a majority
- Turnout: 86.59%
Party	Leader	Vote %	Seats	+/–
Elected in Denmark
Venstre	Anders Fogh Rasmussen	26.26	46	−6
Social Democrats	Helle Thorning-Schmidt	25.47	45	−2
DPP	Pia Kjærsgaard	13.86	25	+1
SF	Villy Søvndal	13.04	23	+12
Conservatives	Bendt Bendtsen	10.39	18	0
Social Liberals	Margrethe Vestager	5.12	9	−8
New Alliance	Naser Khader	2.81	5	New
Red–Green	Collective leadership	2.17	4	−2
Elected in the Faroe Islands
Republic	Høgni Hoydal	25.36	1	0
Union	Kaj Leo Johannesen	23.47	1	+1
Elected in Greenland
Inuit Ataqatigiit	Josef Motzfeldt	33.25	1	0
Siumut	Hans Enoksen	32.16	1	0
This lists parties that won seats. See the complete results below.

Government before	Government after election
Fogh Rasmussen II; V–K	Fogh Rasmussen III; V–K

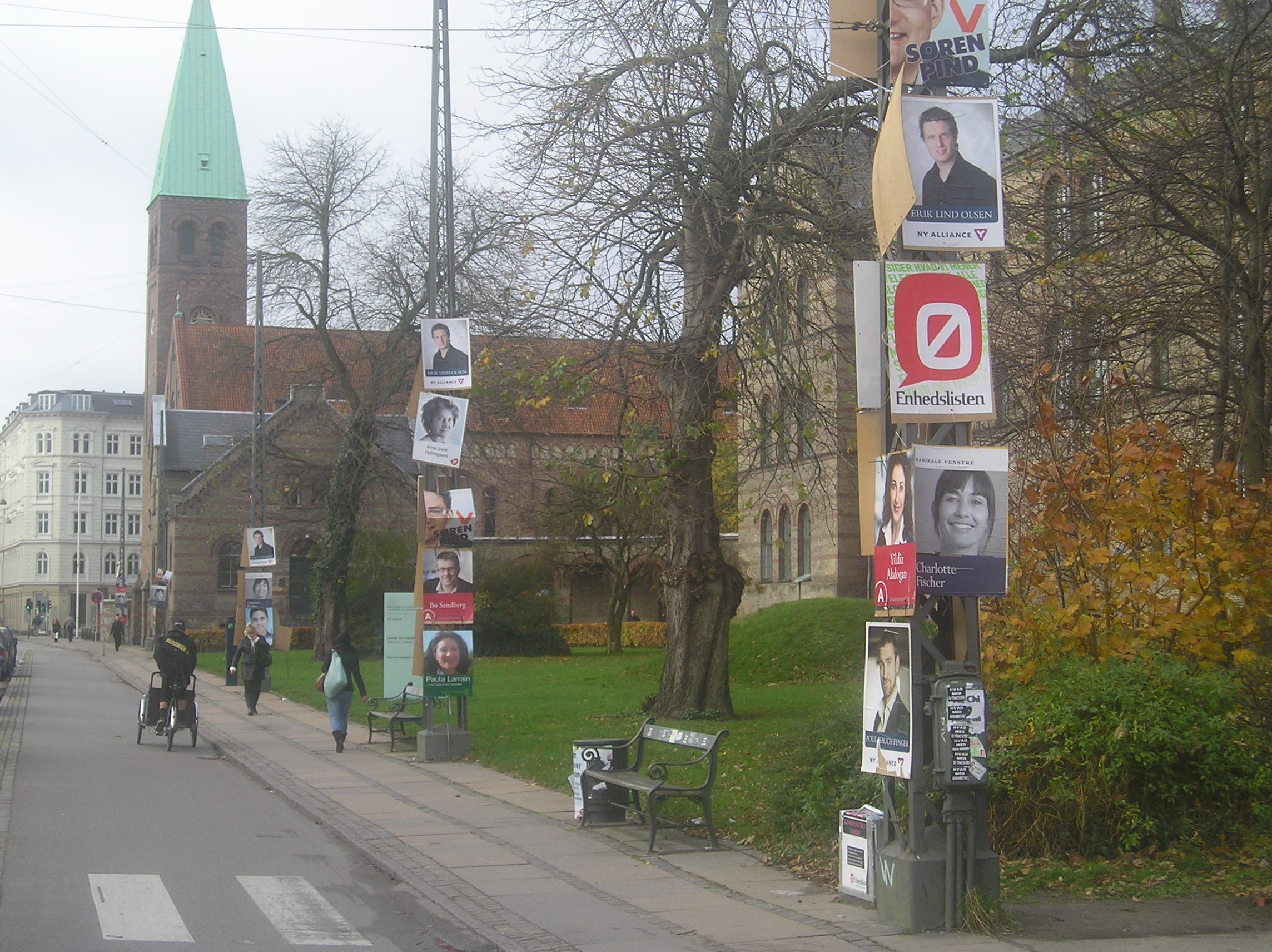
Election posters in Copenhagen.

General elections were held in Denmark on 13 November 2007. The elections allowed prime minister Anders Fogh Rasmussen to continue for a third term in a coalition government consisting of Venstre and the Conservative People's Party with parliamentary support from the Danish People's Party. They were the first elections held using the current constituencies.

== Electoral system ==
The 179 members of the Folketing were elected by party-list proportional representation in multi-member constituencies, with levelling seats filled using overall party vote shares. The districts were re-drawn prior to the elections, reducing the number to 12, which elected between two and 20 members.

== Contesting parties ==
Party	Leader
Denmark proper
Christian Democrats	Bodil Kornbek
Conservative People's Party	Bendt Bendtsen
Danish People's Party	Pia Kjærsgaard
Danish Social Liberal Party	Margrethe Vestager
New Alliance	Naser Khader
Red-Green Alliance	Collective leadership
Social Democrats	Helle Thorning-Schmidt
Socialist People's Party	Villy Søvndal
Venstre	Anders Fogh Rasmussen
Faroe Islands
Centre Party	Álvur Kirke
People's Party	Jørgen Niclasen
Republic	Høgni Hoydal
Self-Government Party	Kári P. Højgaard
Social Democratic Party	Jóannes Eidesgaard
Union Party	Kaj Leo Johannesen
Greenland
Atassut	Finn Karlsen
Democrats	Per Berthelsen
Inuit Ataqatigiit	Josef Motzfeldt
Siumut	Hans Enoksen

=== Coalitions ===
According to the Constitution of Denmark, Denmark is governed according to the principle of negative parliamentarism, meaning that while a government doesn't need the majority of seats in parliament, it must never have a majority of seats against it in a vote of no confidence. Before the ongoing elections, this was relevant since the government, consisting of the Conservative People's Party and the Liberals did not have a majority of seats, but depended on the support of the Danish People's Party. Early opinion polls showed that neither a right-wing or a left-wing government could gather enough seats to be in government without the support of the newly established New Alliance. This caused a lot of interest, since New Alliance had stated that they would first give the government the opportunity to propose a programme for government, but that they would not definitely support a right-wing government prior to seeing how many of their political agendas they could work together on. Many people were unsure how this would be possible, since New Alliance was originally formed to limit the influence of the Danish People's Party, without whom a right-wing government did not seem possible in opinion polls. After the elections, however, it was clear that New Alliance did not get enough seats in parliament to break the previous right-wing majority.

=== The opposition ===
Shortly after the elections were called, the Social Liberal Party stated that they supported a government led by the Social Democrats. The Red-Green Alliance support a left-wing government almost by default. The Socialist People's Party also support a left-wing government, and have stated that they wish to not only support such a government but to be a part of it. In spite of a dramatic increase in support of the Socialist People's Party in opinion polls, these four parties never stood to get enough seats in parliament to head a government. Consequently, prior to the election, Helle Thorning-Schmidt (the leader of the Social Democrats) invited both New Alliance and the Conservative People's Party to participate in a centre-left government, but both parties refused.

=== Early election ===
Danish prime minister Anders Fogh Rasmussen announced this election date on 24 October 2007. The election was held ahead of time in the sense that by law, the election needed to be held before 8 February 2009, four years after the previous election.

Anders Fogh Rasmussen explained that the elections were called early to allow the parliament to work on important upcoming topics without being distracted by a future election. Referring specifically to welfare reform, he said rival parties would then try to outdo each other with expensive reforms which would damage the Danish economy.

=== Parties that had previously declared their intention to run ===
The Centre Democrats lacked about 2,000 - 3,000 of the required 20,000 signatures in order to run in the 2007 election when Anders Fogh Rasmussen called it on 24 October, meaning that they won't be able to run. The Liberalists had reached 5,000 signatures. The Danish Ministry of Welfare has registered more than 70 parties that had not handed in the required number of signatures.

== Campaign ==
Several topics have been mentioned as central to the election. These include welfare, taxes, immigration, and the health system. The election also clears the Rasmussen government from having a potentially unpopular parliamentary debate on the European Union Treaty of Lisbon, as it will become a topic in the election instead.

== Results ==
The Socialist People's Party had the election's largest gain, securing 23 seats in the new parliament compared to 11 in the 2005 elections. The Danish People's Party gained one additional seat, leaving it at 25. The New Alliance secured five seats in its first election, a result lower than projected in earlier opinion polls.

The biggest setback was suffered by the Danish Social Liberal Party which was reduced from 17 seats to 9. The Liberals lost six seats leaving it at 46, and the party remains the biggest party for the third consecutive election. The Social Democrats lost two seats, leaving it at 45. The Red-Green Alliance lost two seats leaving it at four seats, just above the 2% threshold.

The Conservative People's Party ensured marginal gains, but no additional seats, leaving it at 18 seats. The Christian Democrats did not ensure representation.

Greenland's vote resulted in one seat for Siumut and one for Inuit Ataqatigiit. The Faroe Islands returned Høgni Hoydal representing the Republican Party, its second seat went to the Union Party, a seat gained from the People's Party which did not achieve representation.

Party	Votes	%	Seats	+/–
Denmark proper
Venstre	908,472	26.26	46	–6
Social Democrats	881,037	25.47	45	–2
Danish People's Party	479,532	13.86	25	+1
Socialist People's Party	450,975	13.04	23	+12
Conservative People's Party	359,404	10.39	18	0
Danish Social Liberal Party	177,161	5.12	9	–8
New Alliance	97,295	2.81	5	New
Red–Green Alliance	74,982	2.17	4	–2
Christian Democrats	30,013	0.87	0	0
Independents	549	0.02	0	0
Total	3,459,420	100.00	175	0
Valid votes	3,459,420	99.31		
Invalid/blank votes	24,113	0.69		
Total votes	3,483,533	100.00		
Registered voters/turnout	4,022,920	86.59		
Faroe Islands
Republic	5,849	25.36	1	0
Union Party	5,414	23.47	1	+1
People's Party	4,728	20.50	0	–1
Social Democratic Party	4,702	20.39	0	0
Centre Party	1,573	6.82	0	0
Self-Government	799	3.46	0	0
Total	23,065	100.00	2	0
Valid votes	23,065	99.36		
Invalid/blank votes	149	0.64		
Total votes	23,214	100.00		
Registered voters/turnout	34,529	67.23		
Greenland
Inuit Ataqatigiit	8,343	33.25	1	0
Siumut	8,068	32.16	1	0
Democrats	4,584	18.27	0	0
Atassut	4,094	16.32	0	0
Total	25,089	100.00	2	0
Valid votes	25,089	98.05		
Invalid/blank votes	500	1.95		
Total votes	25,589	100.00		
Registered voters/turnout	39,634	64.56		
Source: Danmarks Statistik, Nohen & Stöver

== Aftermath ==
The ruling Liberal-Conservative coalition secured 64 seats. The support of the Danish People's Party (DPP), with 25 seats, left the coalition needing one more seat. Finally, the coalition-friendly Union Party of former Faroese prime minister Edmund Joensen won the needed seat in the Faroese elections.

Parties backing Helle Thorning-Schmidt, in opposition, won 84 seats. (This includes the remaining three seats of the overseas territories.)

The New Alliance won the remaining five seats.

Prime Minister Anders Fogh Rasmussen announced that the party composition of the cabinet would remain as before, but that parties not in a cabinet that support his premiership will have influence over policy. This statement was aimed at the New Alliance. Rasmussen's capacity to accommodate both the New Alliance and the Danish People's Party going forward is not assured – the New Alliance was established, in part, to limit the Danish Peoples' Party's influence. With the DPP in the coalition, Rasmussen can govern: a New Alliance-supported opposition would be short of a majority by one vote. Edmund Joensen's pledge to abstain on matters related to internal affairs of Denmark would alter this, giving the New Alliance the balance of power and risking conflict with the DPP, but Joensen has also pledged that if doing so would risk giving the opposition a majority, he would not abstain, but instead vote with the government.

After the last election, where Rasmussen also secured continuing power, there was some shuffling of minister posts in the cabinet. The resulting Cabinet of Anders Fogh Rasmussen III was presented a few days after the election.

== See also ==
- List of members of the Folketing, 2007–2011
