= 2009 Greenlandic general election =

- 2 June 2009
- All 31 seats in the Inatsisartut; 16 seats needed for a majority
- Turnout: 71.29% (▼3.57 pp)
Party	Leader	Vote %	Seats	+/–
Inuit Ataqatigiit	Kuupik Kleist	44.06	14	+7
Siumut	Hans Enoksen	26.76	9	−1
Democrats	Jens B. Frederiksen	12.80	4	−3
Atassut	Finn Karlsen	10.94	3	−3
Kattusseqatigiit	Anthon Frederiksen	3.83	1	0
This lists parties that won seats. See the complete results below.
Results by municipality
Prime Minister before	Prime Minister after
Hans Enoksen; Siumut	Kuupik Kleist; Inuit Ataqatigiit

General elections were held in Greenland on 2 June 2009. Prime Minister Hans Enoksen announced the election date on 15 April 2009, stating that he would prefer for a newly elected parliament to administer Greenland when the self-government reform took effect on 21 June 2009. The reform gave more power to the Greenlandic parliament with decisions on most issues being devolved to the parliament but defence and foreign affairs remaining under the control of Denmark.

== Results ==
The pro-independence, left-wing opposition party, Inuit Ataqatigiit led by Kuupik Kleist emerged as the largest party with 43.7% of the vote. Kleist set a new record for most votes in a Greenlandic election with 5,461 received. This compares with Akitsinnguaq Olsen who was elected with just 112 votes.

The governing Siumut led by Prime Minister Hans Enoksen received 26.5% of the vote and lost control of the government for the first time in 30 years. Former Siumut leader and Prime Minister Jonathan Motzfeldt failed to be re-elected for the first time since 1971, receiving just 91 votes . Enoksen stated that he would step down as party leader, a position he had held since 2002, if his colleagues wished him to. Siumut was believed to have lost votes over a series of scandals, including one over expenses, and concerns over its ability to manage with greater autonomy.

The newly formed Sorlaat Partiiat gained just 383 votes in the election and dissolved shortly afterwards. The party stood on a platform of huge spending reductions and opposed Greenland rejoining the EU.

Party	Votes	%	Seats	+/–
Inuit Ataqatigiit	12,457	44.06	14	+7
Siumut	7,567	26.76	9	–1
Democrats	3,620	12.80	4	–3
Atassut	3,094	10.94	3	–3
Association of Candidates	1,084	3.83	1	0
Sorlaat	383	1.35	0	New
Independents	70	0.25	0	0
Total	28,275	100.00	31	0
Valid votes	28,275	99.18		
Invalid/blank votes	235	0.82		
Total votes	28,510	100.00		
Registered voters/turnout	39,990	71.29		
Source: Election Passport, Parties & Elections

== Aftermath ==
Siumut was considered likely to be left out of government as both the Inuit Ataqatigiit and Demokraatit parties ruled out the possibility of working with them. Siumut's former coalition partner, Atassut, gained too few seats to make a new coalition powerful enough to challenge for the government.

On 7 June 2009 Inuit Ataqatigiit announced that it would form a coalition with the Democrats and the Association of Candidates.
