= 1987 Greenlandic general election =

| ← 1984 | 26 May 1987 | 1991 → |
- All 27 seats in the Inatsisartut; 14 seats needed for a majority
- Turnout: 69.64% (▼2.88 pp)
| Party | Leader | Vote % | Seats | +/– |
|---|---|---|---|---|
| Atassut | Otto Steenholdt | 40.07% | 11 | 0 |
| Siumut | Jonathan Motzfeldt | 39.84% | 11 | 0 |
| Inuit Ataqatigiit | Aqqaluk Lynge | 15.25% | 4 | +1 |
| Issittup | Nikolaj Heinrich | 4.46% | 1 | New |
This lists parties that won seats. See the complete results below.
| Prime Minister before | Prime Minister after |
|---|---|
| Jonathan Motzfeldt; Siumut | Jonathan Motzfeldt; Siumut |

General elections were held in Greenland on 26 May 1987. Siumut and Atassut both won 11 seats in the 27-seat Parliament. This was the last time a center-right party came in first place until 2025.

== Results ==
| Party | Votes | % | Seats | +/– |
|---|---|---|---|---|
| Atassut | 10,044 | 40.07 | 11 | 0 |
| Siumut | 9,987 | 39.84 | 11 | 0 |
| Inuit Ataqatigiit | 3,823 | 15.25 | 4 | +1 |
| Polar Party | 1,119 | 4.46 | 1 | New |
| Independents | 95 | 0.38 | 0 | New |
| Total | 25,068 | 100.00 | 27 | +2 |
| Valid votes | 25,068 | 97.30 | | |
| Invalid/blank votes | 696 | 2.70 | | |
| Total votes | 25,764 | 100.00 | | |
| Registered voters/turnout | 36,998 | 69.64 | | |
Source: DST, Parties & Elections
