= 2011 Danish general election =

- 15 September 2011
- All 179 seats in the Folketing; 90 seats needed for a majority
- Turnout: 87.21%
Party	Leader	Vote %	Seats	+/–
Elected in Denmark
Venstre	Lars Løkke Rasmussen	26.73	47	+1
Social Democrats	Helle Thorning-Schmidt	24.81	44	−1
DPP	Pia Kjærsgaard	12.32	22	−3
Social Liberals	Margrethe Vestager	9.50	17	+8
SF	Villy Søvndal	9.20	16	−7
Red–Green	Collective leadership	6.68	12	+8
Liberal Alliance	Anders Samuelsen	4.98	9	+4
Conservatives	Lars Barfoed	4.94	8	−10
Elected in the Faroe Islands
Union	Kaj Leo Johannesen	30.77	1	0
Social Democratic	Aksel V. Johannesen	20.95	1	+1
Elected in Greenland
Inuit Ataqatigiit	Kuupik Kleist	42.61	1	0
Siumut	Aleqa Hammond	37.22	1	0
This lists parties that won seats. See the complete results below.

Government before	Government after election
Løkke Rasmussen I V–K	Thorning-Schmidt I S–R–SF

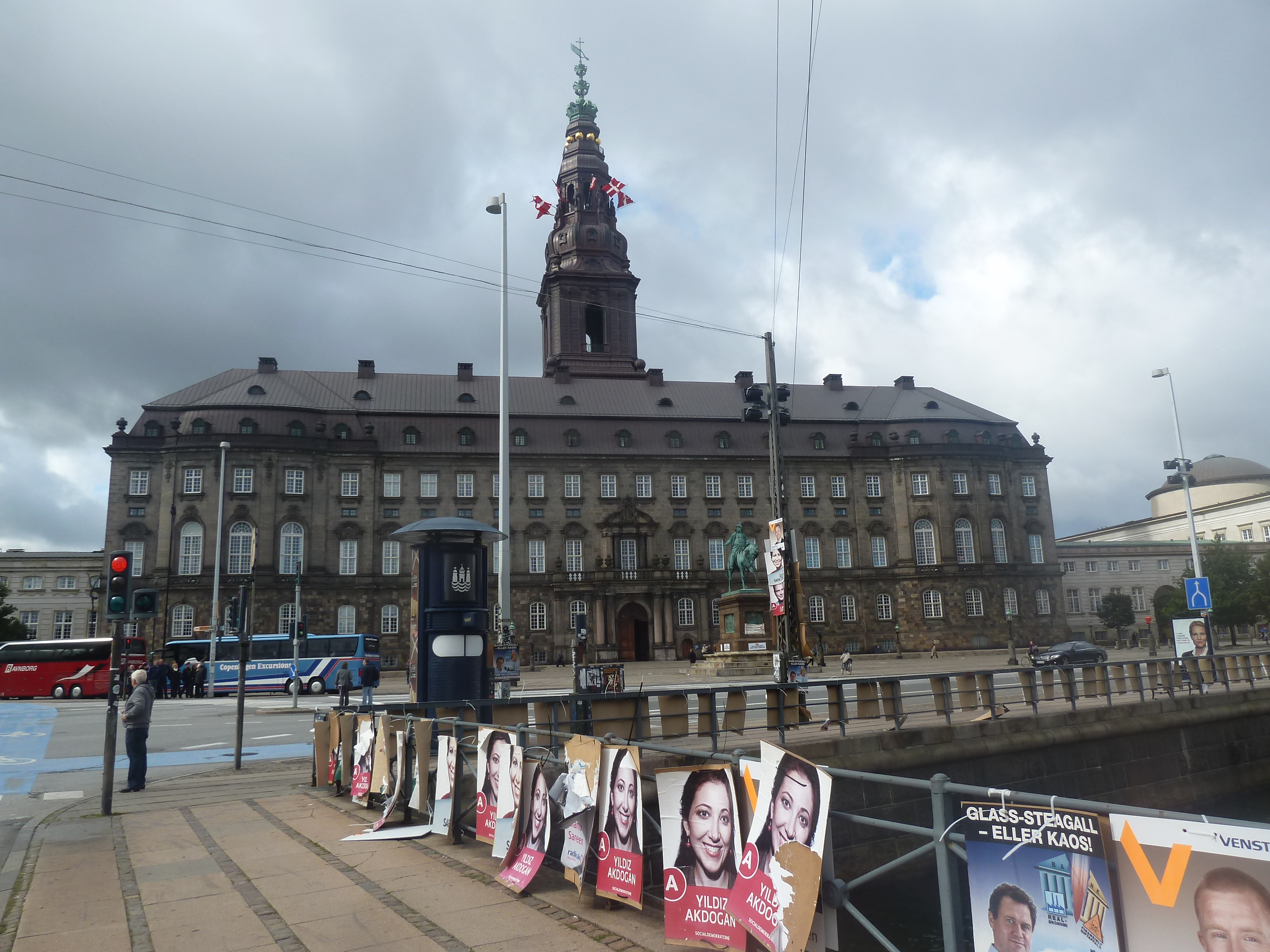
Campaign posters outside Christiansborg Palace (seat of the Folketing) on the day of the election.

General elections were held in Denmark on 15 September 2011 to elect the 179 members of the Folketing. Of those 179, 175 members were elected in Denmark, two in the Faroe Islands and two in Greenland.

The incumbent centre-right coalition led by Venstre lost power to a centre-left coalition led by the Social Democrats making Helle Thorning-Schmidt the country's first female Prime Minister. The Social Liberal Party and the Socialist People's Party became part of the three-party government. The new parliament convened on 4 October, the first Tuesday of the month.

== Background ==
Anders Fogh Rasmussen, who had been re-elected Prime Minister following the 2007 parliamentary election, resigned on 5 April 2009 to become the Secretary General of NATO in August. Polls indicated a preference for early elections over simply having Finance Minister Lars Løkke Rasmussen take over as PM; the Social Democrats' Helle Thorning-Schmidt was also suggested as the preferred candidate for PM. However, Pia Kjærsgaard, the leader of the Danish People's Party, had reiterated the DPP's continued support for the government, previously avoiding a new election and making Rasmussen the PM within the existing parliament. However, when Rasmussen resigned that support became moot.

== Date ==
According to the Danish Constitution, the election had to take place no later than 12 November 2011 since the last Danish election was held on 13 November 2007. The prime minister can call the election at any date, provided it is no later than four years from the previous election. Danish media and political commentators speculated about the timing of the election since Rasmussen took office as Prime Minister in April 2009. The election was called on 26 August 2011, after heavy media speculation.

== MPs not seeking re-election ==
The following had as of March 2010 announced that they would not seek re-election.

- Malou Aamund (Venstre)
- Britta Schall Holberg (Venstre)
- Preben Rudiengaard (Venstre)
- Jens Vibjerg (Venstre)
- Jens Kirk (Venstre)
- Lone Møller (Social Democrats)
- Vibeke Grave (Social Democrats)
- Niels Sindal (Social Democrats)
- Lise von Seelen (Social Democrats)
- Jens Christian Lund (Social Democrats)
- Jens Peter Vernersen (Social Democrats)
- Søren Krarup (Danish People's Party)
- Jesper Langballe (Danish People's Party)
- Lone Dybkjær (Social Liberal Party)
- Niels Helveg Petersen (Social Liberal Party)
- Bente Dahl (Social Liberal Party)
- Jørgen Poulsen (Social Liberal Party)
- Line Barfod (Red-Green Alliance)

=== Retired MPs ===
- Mogens Camre (DF)
- Rikke Hvilshøj (V)
- Gitte Seeberg (Independent)
- Mia Falkenberg (DF)
- Anders Fogh Rasmussen (V)
- Morten Messerschmidt (DF)
- Bendt Bendtsen (K)
- Svend Auken (S)
- Morten Helveg Petersen (R)
- Thomas Adelskov (S)
- Lene Hansen (S)
- Knud Kristensen (K)
- Connie Hedegaard (K)
- Søren Gade (V)

== Contesting parties ==
Party	Letter	Leader
Denmark proper
Venstre	V	Lars Løkke Rasmussen
Social Democrats (Socialdemokraterne)	A	Helle Thorning-Schmidt
Danish People's Party (Dansk Folkeparti)	O	Pia Kjærsgaard
Danish Social Liberal Party (Det Radikale Venstre)	B	Margrethe Vestager
Socialist People's Party (Socialistisk Folkeparti)	F	Villy Søvndal
Red-Green Alliance (Enhedslisten)	Ø	Collective leadership
Liberal Alliance	I	Anders Samuelsen
Conservative People's Party (Det Konservative Folkeparti)	C	Lars Barfoed
Christian Democrats (Kristendemokraterne)	K	Per Ørum Jørgensen
Faroe Islands
Union Party (Sambandsflokkurin)	B	Kaj Leo Johannesen
Social Democratic Party (Javnaðarflokkurin)	C	Aksel Johannesen
Republic (Tjóðveldi)	E	Høgni Hoydal
People's Party (Fólkaflokkurin)	A	Jørgen Niclasen
Centre Party (Miðflokkurin)	H	Jenis av Rana
Self-Government Party (Sjálvstýrisflokkurin)	D	Kári á Rógvu
Greenland
Inuit Ataqatigiit		Kuupik Kleist
Siumut		Aleqa Hammond
Democrats (Demokraatit)		Jens B. Frederiksen
Atassut		Finn Karlsen

=== Coalitions ===
The former Prime Minister, Lars Løkke Rasmussen, led a centre-right minority government consisting of the Liberal Party and the Conservative People's Party. This coalition government worked with regular parliamentary support from the national conservative Danish People's Party and often gained the necessary 90th seat for a majority in the Folketing through negotiations with the sole MP from the Christian Democrats Ørum-Jørgensen and independent MP Christmas Møller, both elected in 2007 as conservative MPs and since having defected.

Since the 2007 election, the Liberal Alliance (previously Ny Alliance) had gained momentum in opinion polls, and since early 2010, the governing coalition had not been able to gather a majority in the polls without the support of the Alliance. The continuing rise in the polls was to an extent the result of the internal crisis in the Conservative People's Party over the leadership Lene Espersen and the continuing debate over a lack of true liberal/conservative ideology in government policy.

On 13 January, the continuing turmoil within the Conservative group in the Folketing caused Lene Espersen to resign as political leader of the party and focus on her role as Minister of Foreign Affairs. A leadership election between Brian Mikkelsen, the Minister of Economic and Business Affairs and Lars Barfoed, the Justice Minister, was widely expected, but on 14 January the Conservative group in the Folketing unanimously elected Barfoed as their new political leader. He was formally elected as chairman of the party at a party convention within a few weeks.

The Social Democrats, under the leadership of Helle Thorning-Schmidt, had enjoyed continuing majorities in opinion polls since late 2009 and hoped to form a centre-left government coalition consisting of the Socialist People's Party and the Social Liberal Party with parliamentary support from the small Red-Green Alliance.

Both Margrethe Vestager (Social Liberal Party) and Villy Søvndal (Socialist People's Party) pledged their support to Thorning-Schmidt before the election. But there has been considerable debate about the future politics of this coalition, mainly because the Social Liberal Party demands a more liberal economic agenda. Also on immigration issues there are political differences between the three coalition parties. This led some observers to believe that the Social Liberal Party would not join a government coalition but instead opt to be a part of the parliamentary support of a new, centre-left government. In the event the Social Liberals did join the new three-party coalition government formed on 3 October.

== Opinion polls ==
Polling Firm	Date	Source	Venstre (V)	Social Democrats (A)	Danish People's Party (O)	Socialist People's Party (F)	Conservative People's Party (C)	Social Liberal Party (B)	Liberal Alliance (I)	Red-Green Alliance (Ø)	Christian Democrats (K)	Government	Opposition
2007 Election	13 Nov 2007		26.2%	25.5%	13.9%	13.0%	10.4%	5.1%	2.8%	2.2%	0.9%	53.3%	46.7%
Capacent	26 Feb 2010		22.1%	26.3%	14.5%	18.1%	11.6%	4.4%	0.7%	2.0%	0.3%	48.9%	50.8%
Capacent	31 Mar 2010		23.7%	26.7%	13.8%	17.2%	10.9%	4.6%	0.5%	2.2%	0.3%	48.9%	50.7%
Greens	7 Jan 2011		21.6%	29.2%	14.6%	13.0%	4.5%	7.5%	5.8%	3.2%	0.4%	46.5%	52.9%
Gallup	7 Jan 2011		24.3%	31.3%	12.2%	12.7%	6.0%	5.5%	4.3%	2.9%	0.8%	46.8%	52.4%
YouGov	12 Jan 2011		21.8%	26.4%	13.5%	15.2%	4.4%	6.2%	8.3%	4.0%	0.3%	48.0%	51.8%
Capacent	12 Jan 2011		23.1%	29.9%	13.0%	13.0%	5.9%	5.5%	4.3%	4.8%	0.3%	46.3%	53.2%
Gallup	14 Jan 2011		24.6%	28.6%	13.0%	14.9%	5.7%	5.8%	4.0%	2.9%	0.5%	47.3%	52.2%
Voxmeter	16 Jan 2011		22.9%	31.1%	11.8%	12.3%	5.7%	5.6%	6.3%	3.7%	0.0%	46.6%	52.7%
Greens	21 Jan 2011		22.6%	29.5%	11.6%	14.2%	6.5%	6.5%	5.4%	2.7%	0.4%	46.1%	52.9%
Gallup	24 Jan 2011		23.9%	27.6%	14.0%	13.8%	4.9%	7.3%	4.7%	2.7%	0.8%	47.5%	51.4%
Greens	4 Feb 2011		21.3%	31.2%	12.3%	15.6%	5.4%	5.6%	4.4%	3.3%	0.6%	43.4%	55.7%
Berlingske	10 Sep 2011		23.6%	25.5%	12.4%	11.1%	5.9%	9.3%	5.1%	6.4%	0.8%	47.8%	52.3%
Berlingske	10 Sep 2011		23.0%	25.0%	13.6%	9.8%	5.0%	10.0%	5.4%	7.2%	0.9%	47.9%	52.0%
Berlingske	12 Sep 2011		23.8%	25.3%	12.3%	10.7%	5.8%	9.5%	5.2%	6.5%	0.8%	47.9%	52.0%

== Results ==

Party	Votes	%	Seats	+/–
Denmark proper
Venstre	947,725	26.73	47	+1
Social Democrats	879,615	24.81	44	−1
Danish People's Party	436,726	12.32	22	−3
Danish Social Liberal Party	336,698	9.50	17	+8
Socialist People's Party	326,192	9.20	16	−7
Red–Green Alliance	236,860	6.68	12	+8
Liberal Alliance	176,585	4.98	9	+4
Conservative People's Party	175,047	4.94	8	−10
Christian Democrats	28,070	0.79	0	0
Independents	1,850	0.05	0	0
Total	3,545,368	100.00	175	0
Valid votes	3,545,368	99.04		
Invalid/blank votes	34,307	0.96		
Total votes	3,579,675	100.00		
Registered voters/turnout	4,079,910	87.74		
Faroe Islands
Union Party	6,362	30.77	1	0
Social Democratic Party	4,332	20.95	1	+1
Republic	3,995	19.32	0	−1
People's Party	3,935	19.03	0	0
Centre Party	875	4.23	0	0
Self-Government	483	2.34	0	0
Independents	692	3.35	0	0
Total	20,674	100.00	2	0
Valid votes	20,674	98.62		
Invalid/blank votes	290	1.38		
Total votes	20,964	100.00		
Registered voters/turnout	35,047	59.82		
Greenland
Inuit Ataqatigiit	9,587	42.61	1	0
Siumut	8,374	37.22	1	0
Democrats	2,831	12.58	0	0
Atassut	1,706	7.58	0	0
Total	22,498	100.00	2	0
Valid votes	22,498	95.55		
Invalid/blank votes	1,048	4.45		
Total votes	23,546	100.00		
Registered voters/turnout	40,937	57.52		
Source: Danmarks Statistik

== Reactions ==
Helle Thorning-Schmidt told a group of supporters: "We did it. Make no mistake: We have written history. Today there’s a change of guards in Denmark." Incumbent Prime Minister Lars Løkke Rasmussen congratulated Thorning-Schmidt after conceding defeat: "So tonight I hand over the keys to the prime minister’s office to Helle Thorning-Schmidt. And dear Helle, take good care of them. You’re only borrowing them."

The Copenhagen Stock Exchange did not react adversely despite a fear of increased public spending and higher taxes because the election result was largely expected.

== Analysis ==
The result was seen as leading to a possible roll back of some austerity programmes initiated by the previous government amidst the European sovereign debt crisis. The new majority for the leftist bloc deprived the Danish People's Party of the kingmaker role it held under the previous government and used to tighten Danish immigrations policy. However, fundamental changes were not expected, as the Danish political consensus would maintain the welfare system in Denmark that is financed by high taxes. The state of the economy was also seen as a key factor for the anti-incumbent vote.

Danish newspapers such as Berlingske also asked if a Red Bloc coalition could survive its tenure with the "sharp differences between [the] parties." It wrote that "with a parliamentary basis consisting of parties in deep mutual dispute over the most important questions in society, the election victory last night could turn out to be a short-lived triumph for Thorning-Schmidt."

== Government formation ==
Though the Liberal Party remained the single largest party with the addition of one seat and the Social Democrats lost a seat, a three-party coalition of opposition parties together with the supporting Red-Green Alliance had a larger share of seats than the incumbent liberal-conservative coalition with support of the Danish People's Party. Prime Minister Lars Løkke Rasmussen then tendered the cabinet's resignation to Queen Margrethe II on 16 September, following which she met with the various parties and tasked Social Democrat leader Helle Thorning-Schmidt with the formation of a new government. Rasmussen's cabinet would remain in office as a caretaker government until 3 October, when Thorning-Schmidt's cabinet, announced on 2 October, would be sworn in making her the country's first ever female Prime Minister. The Social Liberal Party and the Socialist People's Party also became a part of the governing coalition. The new parliament, by law, convened on the first Tuesday in October.

== See also ==
- List of members of the Folketing, 2011–2015
