= 2001 Danish general election =

- 20 November 2001
- All 179 seats in the Folketing; 90 seats needed for a majority
- Turnout: 87.15%
Party	Leader	Vote %	Seats	+/–
Venstre	Anders Fogh Rasmussen	31.25	56	+14
Social Democrats	Poul Nyrup Rasmussen	29.08	52	−11
DPP	Pia Kjærsgaard	12.00	22	+9
Conservatives	Bendt Bendtsen	9.07	16	0
SF	Holger K. Nielsen	6.37	12	−1
Social Liberals	Marianne Jelved	5.19	9	+2
Red–Green	Collective leadership	2.40	4	−1
KrF	Jann Sjursen	2.28	4	0
Elected in the Faroe Islands
Union	Kaj Leo Johannesen	27.31	1	+1
Republican	Høgni Hoydal	24.92	1	+1
Elected in Greenland
Inuit Ataqatigiit	Josef Motzfeldt	30.83	1	+1
Siumut	Hans Enoksen	25.94	1	0
This lists parties that won seats. See the complete results below.

Government before	Government after election
Nyrup Rasmussen IV; S–R	Fogh Rasmussen I V–K

General elections were held in Denmark on 20 November 2001. For the first time since the 1924 elections, the Social Democrats did not win the most seats. Anders Fogh Rasmussen of the centre-right Venstre became Prime Minister in coalition with the Conservative People's Party, as the head of the first Rasmussen government, with the support from Danish People's Party.

The coalition relied on the votes of other right-wing parties such as the Danish People's Party, which polled better than ever before. Voter turnout was 87.1% in Denmark proper, 80.0% in the Faroe Islands and 61.5% in Greenland. The Venstre led coalition government would last until the 2011 election, lasting through two intermediate elections.

The election marked a major shift in Danish politics: It was the first time that the right leaning parties held an outright majority in the parliament since the beginning of the modern democratic system in Denmark in 1901; although right leaning parties had held power several times, they had always had to share power with more centrist or left-wing parties in coalition governments, such as the Danish Social Liberal Party. Historian Bo Lidegaard said that the vote showed a move away from broad national consensus which had existed since the 1930s regarding the style of governance in Denmark. One of the most important changes that forced the change was the rise of immigration as a political issue and the ensuing rise of the Danish People's Party. Immigration played a central role in the 2001 campaign and was thrust into focus by the 11 September 2001 terrorist attacks in the United States, although it had been gaining attention for years.

== Results ==
Party	Votes	%	Seats	+/–
Denmark proper
Venstre	1,077,858	31.25	56	+14
Social Democrats	1,003,323	29.08	52	–11
Danish People's Party	413,987	12.00	22	+9
Conservative People's Party	312,770	9.07	16	0
Socialist People's Party	219,842	6.37	12	–1
Danish Social Liberal Party	179,023	5.19	9	+2
Red–Green Alliance	82,685	2.40	4	–1
Christian People's Party	78,793	2.28	4	0
Centre Democrats	61,031	1.77	0	–8
Progress Party	19,340	0.56	0	–4
Independents	1,016	0.03	0	0
Total	3,449,668	100.00	175	0
Valid votes	3,449,668	98.99		
Invalid/blank votes	35,247	1.01		
Total votes	3,484,915	100.00		
Registered voters/turnout	3,998,957	87.15		
Faroe Islands
Union Party	7,208	27.31	1	+1
Republican Party	6,578	24.92	1	+1
Social Democratic Party	6,187	23.44	0	–1
People's Party	5,417	20.52	0	–1
Centre Party	569	2.16	0	New
Self-Government	434	1.64	0	0
Total	26,393	100.00	2	0
Valid votes	26,393	99.60		
Invalid/blank votes	105	0.40		
Total votes	26,498	100.00		
Registered voters/turnout	33,106	80.04		
Greenland
Inuit Ataqatigiit	7,172	30.83	1	+1
Siumut	6,033	25.94	1	0
Atassut	5,138	22.09	0	–1
Independents	4,917	21.14	0	0
Total	23,260	100.00	2	0
Valid votes	23,260	97.65		
Invalid/blank votes	559	2.35		
Total votes	23,819	100.00		
Registered voters/turnout	38,710	61.53		
Source: Nohlen & Stöver

=== Maps ===
Largest party within each nomination district and constituency.

Largest party within each municipality.

== See also ==
- List of members of the Folketing, 2001–2005
