= 1999 Greenlandic general election =

← 1995	16 February 1999	2002 →
- All 31 seats in the Inatsisartut; 16 seats needed for a majority
- Turnout: 76.00% (▲6.41 pp)
Party	Leader	Vote %	Seats	+/–
Siumut	Jonathan Motzfeldt	35.16%	11	−1
Atassut	Daniel Skifte	25.22%	8	−2
Inuit Ataqatigiit	Josef Motzfeldt	22.08%	7	+1
Kattusseqatigiit	Anthon Frederiksen	12.26%	4	+3
Independent	–	5.28%	1	+1
This lists parties that won seats. See the complete results below.
Prime Minister before	Prime Minister after
Jonathan Motzfeldt; Siumut	Jonathan Motzfeldt; Siumut

General elections were held in Greenland on 16 February 1999. Siumut remained the largest party in the Parliament, winning 11 of the 31 seats.

== Results ==
Party	Votes	%	Seats	+/–
Siumut	9,899	35.16	11	–1
Atassut	7,100	25.22	8	–2
Inuit Ataqatigiit	6,217	22.08	7	+1
Association of Candidates	3,453	12.26	4	+3
Independents	1,486	5.28	1	New
Total	28,155	100.00	31	0
Valid votes	28,155	98.82		
Invalid/blank votes	335	1.18		
Total votes	28,490	100.00		
Registered voters/turnout	37,485	76.00		
Source: Stat.gl
