= 1998 Danish general election =

- 11 March 1998
- All 179 seats in the Folketing; 90 seats needed for a majority
- Turnout: 85.95%
Party	Leader	Vote %	Seats	+/–
Social Democrats	Poul Nyrup Rasmussen	35.93	63	+1
Venstre	Uffe Ellemann-Jensen	24.01	42	0
Conservatives	Per Stig Møller	8.92	16	−11
SF	Holger K. Nielsen	7.56	13	0
DPP	Pia Kjærsgaard	7.41	13	New
Centre Democrats	Mimi Jakobsen	4.31	8	+3
Social Liberals	Marianne Jelved	3.85	7	−1
Red–Green	Collective leadership	2.70	5	−1
KrF	Jann Sjursen	2.51	4	+4
Progress	Kirsten Jacobsen	2.42	4	−7
Elected in the Faroe Islands
People's	Anfinn Kallsberg	26.91	1	0
Social Democratic	Jóannes Eidesgaard	22.66	1	+1
Elected in Greenland
Siumut	Lars-Emil Johansen	36.34	1	New
Atassut	Daniel Skifte	36.01	1	0
This lists parties that won seats. See the complete results below.

Government before	Government after election
Nyrup Rasmussen III; S–R	Nyrup Rasmussen IV; S–R

General elections were held in Denmark on 11 March 1998. Although the centre-right parties led by Venstre had been expected to win, the Social Democratic Party-led government of Poul Nyrup Rasmussen remained in power in a very close vote that required several recounts.

Venstre leader Uffe Ellemann-Jensen resigned as party leader a few days after the election. The new Danish People's Party made a successful electoral debut. Voter turnout was 85.9% in Denmark proper, 66.1% in the Faroe Islands and 63.2% in Greenland.

== Results ==
Party	Votes	%	Seats	+/–
Denmark proper
Social Democrats	1,223,620	35.93	63	+1
Venstre	817,894	24.01	42	0
Conservative People's Party	303,965	8.92	16	–11
Socialist People's Party	257,406	7.56	13	0
Danish People's Party	252,429	7.41	13	New
Centre Democrats	146,802	4.31	8	+3
Danish Social Liberal Party	131,254	3.85	7	–1
Red–Green Alliance	91,933	2.70	5	–1
Christian People's Party	85,656	2.51	4	+4
Progress Party	82,437	2.42	4	–7
Democratic Renewal	10,768	0.32	0	New
Independents	1,833	0.05	0	–1
Total	3,405,997	100.00	175	0
Valid votes	3,405,997	99.24		
Invalid/blank votes	25,929	0.76		
Total votes	3,431,926	100.00		
Registered voters/turnout	3,993,099	85.95		
Faroe Islands
People's Party	5,569	26.91	1	0
Social Democratic Party	4,689	22.66	1	+1
Union Party	4,510	21.79	0	–1
Republican Party	4,325	20.90	0	0
Self-Government	1,603	7.75	0	0
Total	20,696	100.00	2	0
Valid votes	20,696	99.30		
Invalid/blank votes	146	0.70		
Total votes	20,842	100.00		
Registered voters/turnout	31,509	66.15		
Greenland
Siumut	8,646	36.34	1	New
Atassut	8,569	36.01	1	0
Inuit Ataqatigiit	5,138	21.59	0	New
Association of Candidates	1,310	5.51	0	New
Centre Party	101	0.42	0	0
Independents	29	0.12	0	–1
Total	23,793	100.00	2	0
Valid votes	23,793	97.89		
Invalid/blank votes	512	2.11		
Total votes	24,305	100.00		
Registered voters/turnout	37,856	64.20		
Source: Nohlen & Stöver, Timarit

=== Maps ===
Largest party within each nomination district and constituency.

Largest party within each municipality.

== See also ==
- List of members of the Folketing, 1998–2001
