= 1995 Greenlandic general election =

← 1991	4 March 1995	1999 →
- All 31 seats in the Inatsisartut; 16 seats needed for a majority
- Turnout: 69.59% (▼0.05 pp)
Party	Leader	Vote %	Seats	+/–
Siumut	Lars-Emil Johansen	38.44%	12	+1
Atassut	Daniel Skifte	30.09%	10	+2
Inuit Ataqatigiit	Josef Motzfeldt	20.31%	6	+1
Akulliit	Bjarne Kreutzmann	9.49%	2	0
Kattusseqatigiit	Anthon Frederiksen	4.68%	1	New
This lists parties that won seats. See the complete results below.
Prime Minister before	Prime Minister after
Lars-Emil Johansen; Siumut	Lars-Emil Johansen; Siumut

General elections were held in Greenland on 4 March 1995. Siumut remained the largest party in the Parliament, winning 12 of the 31 seats.

== Results ==
Party	Votes	%	Seats	+/–
Siumut	9,803	38.44	12	+1
Atassut	7,674	30.09	10	+2
Inuit Ataqatigiit	5,180	20.31	6	+1
Centre Party	1,560	6.12	2	0
Association of Candidates	1,193	4.68	1	New
Polar Party	90	0.35	0	–1
Total	25,500	100.00	31	+4
Valid votes	25,500	97.57		
Invalid/blank votes	634	2.43		
Total votes	26,134	100.00		
Registered voters/turnout	37,556	69.59		
Source: Election Passport, Parties & Elections
