= 1983 Greenlandic general election =

- 12 April 1983
- All 26 seats in the Inatsisartut; 14 seats needed for a majority
- Turnout: 74.23% (▲4.65 pp)
Party	Leader	Vote %	Seats	+/–
Atassut	Lars Chemnitz	46.64%	12	+4
Siumut	Jonathan Motzfeldt	42.27%	12	−1
Inuit Ataqatigiit	Aqqaluk Lynge	10.65%	2	+2
This lists parties that won seats. See the complete results below.
Prime Minister before	Prime Minister after
Jonathan Motzfeldt; Siumut	Jonathan Motzfeldt; Siumut

General elections were held in Greenland in April 1983. Siumut and Atassut both won 12 seats in the 26-seat Parliament.

== Results ==
Party	Votes	%	Seats	+/–
Atassut	11,443	46.64	12	+4
Siumut	10,371	42.27	12	–1
Inuit Ataqatigiit	2,612	10.65	2	+2
Independents	111	0.45	0	0
Total	24,537	100.00	26	+5
Valid votes	24,537	97.35		
Invalid/blank votes	667	2.65		
Total votes	25,204	100.00		
Registered voters/turnout	33,953	74.23		
Source: Atuagagdliutit, Election Passport, Parties & Elections
