= 1991 Greenlandic general election =

| ← 1987 | 5 March 1991 | 1995 → |
- All 27 seats in the Inatsisartut; 14 seats needed for a majority
- Turnout: 69.64% (▼2.15 pp)
| Party | Leader | Vote % | Seats | +/– |
|---|---|---|---|---|
| Siumut | Lars-Emil Johansen | 37.30% | 11 | 0 |
| Atassut | Konrad Steenholdt | 30.11% | 8 | −3 |
| Inuit Ataqatigiit | Aqqaluk Lynge | 15.25% | 5 | +1 |
| Akulliit | Bjarne Kreutzmann | 9.49% | 2 | New |
| Issittup | Nikolaj Heinrich | 2.82% | 1 | 0 |
This lists parties that won seats. See the complete results below.
| Prime Minister before | Prime Minister after |
|---|---|
| Jonathan Motzfeldt; Siumut | Lars-Emil Johansen; Siumut |

General elections were held in Greenland on 5 March 1991. Siumut emerged as the largest party in the Parliament, winning 11 of the 27 seats.

== Results ==
| Party | Votes | % | Seats | +/– |
|---|---|---|---|---|
| Siumut | 9,336 | 37.30 | 11 | 0 |
| Atassut | 7,536 | 30.11 | 8 | –3 |
| Inuit Ataqatigiit | 4,848 | 19.37 | 5 | +2 |
| Centre Party | 2,374 | 9.49 | 2 | New |
| Polar Party | 706 | 2.82 | 1 | 0 |
| Independents | 228 | 0.91 | 0 | 0 |
| Total | 25,028 | 100.00 | 27 | +1 |
| Valid votes | 25,028 | 96.58 | | |
| Invalid/blank votes | 887 | 3.42 | | |
| Total votes | 25,915 | 100.00 | | |
| Registered voters/turnout | 38,396 | 67.49 | | |
Source: Election Passport, Parties & Elections
