= Centre Party (Greenland) =

Political party in Greenland

The Centre Party (Greenlandic: Akulliit Partiiat, Danish: Centerpartiet) was a political party in Greenland founded by the former Mayor of Nuuk Bjarne Kreutzmann in 1990. The party was an attempt to find a middle ground between the left wing separatism of Siumut (with public ownership of most of the industry and the dominant trading company) and the liberal unionism of Atassut. According to the party, Greenland should privatize, deregulate and lower taxes in order to obtain the economic basis for independence by creating a strong private sector; this would enable the country to become more self-reliant and gradually eliminate the Danish state grant, which financed most of the public sector.

== History ==
The party won two seats in the 1991 elections, retaining both in the 1995 elections. However, it did not contest any further national elections.
