= 1979 Greenlandic general election =

- 4 April 1979
- All 21 seats in the Inatsisartut; 11 seats needed for a majority
- Turnout: 69.58%
Party	Leader	Vote %	Seats	+/–
Siumut	Jonathan Motzfeldt	46.12%	13	New
Atassut	Lars Chemnitz	41.69%	8	New
This lists parties that won seats. See the complete results below.
Results by constituency
Governor before	Prime Minister
Hans Lassen; Independent	Jonathan Motzfeldt; Siumut

General elections were held in Greenland on 4 April 1979, the first election to the new Inatsisartut after the introduction of home rule. The result was a victory for the separatist and left wing Siumut, which won 13 of the 21 seats in the Parliament, over the unionist and moderate Atassut. The difference in seats won became relatively large because of the use of first past the post in five constituencies in northern and eastern Greenland, which were all won by Siumut, while the two parties split the 16 seats in the multi member constituencies in Western Greenland evenly. As a result of the election Jonathan Motzfeldt from Siumut became the first head of government in Greenland. No party has won a majority of seats in the Inatsisartut since.

== Results ==
Party	Votes	%	Seats
Siumut	8,505	46.12	13
Atassut	7,688	41.69	8
Labour Party	1,041	5.64	0
Inuit Ataqatigiit	813	4.41	0
Independents	396	2.15	0
Total	18,443	100.00	21
Valid votes	18,443	92.44	
Invalid/blank votes	1,508	7.56	
Total votes	19,951	100.00	
Registered voters/turnout	28,672	69.58	
Source: Election Passport, Parties & Elections
