= Prime Minister of Greenland =

Head of the government of Greenland

- Naalakkersuisut Siulittaasuat
- Coat of arms of Greenland

- Flag of Greenland

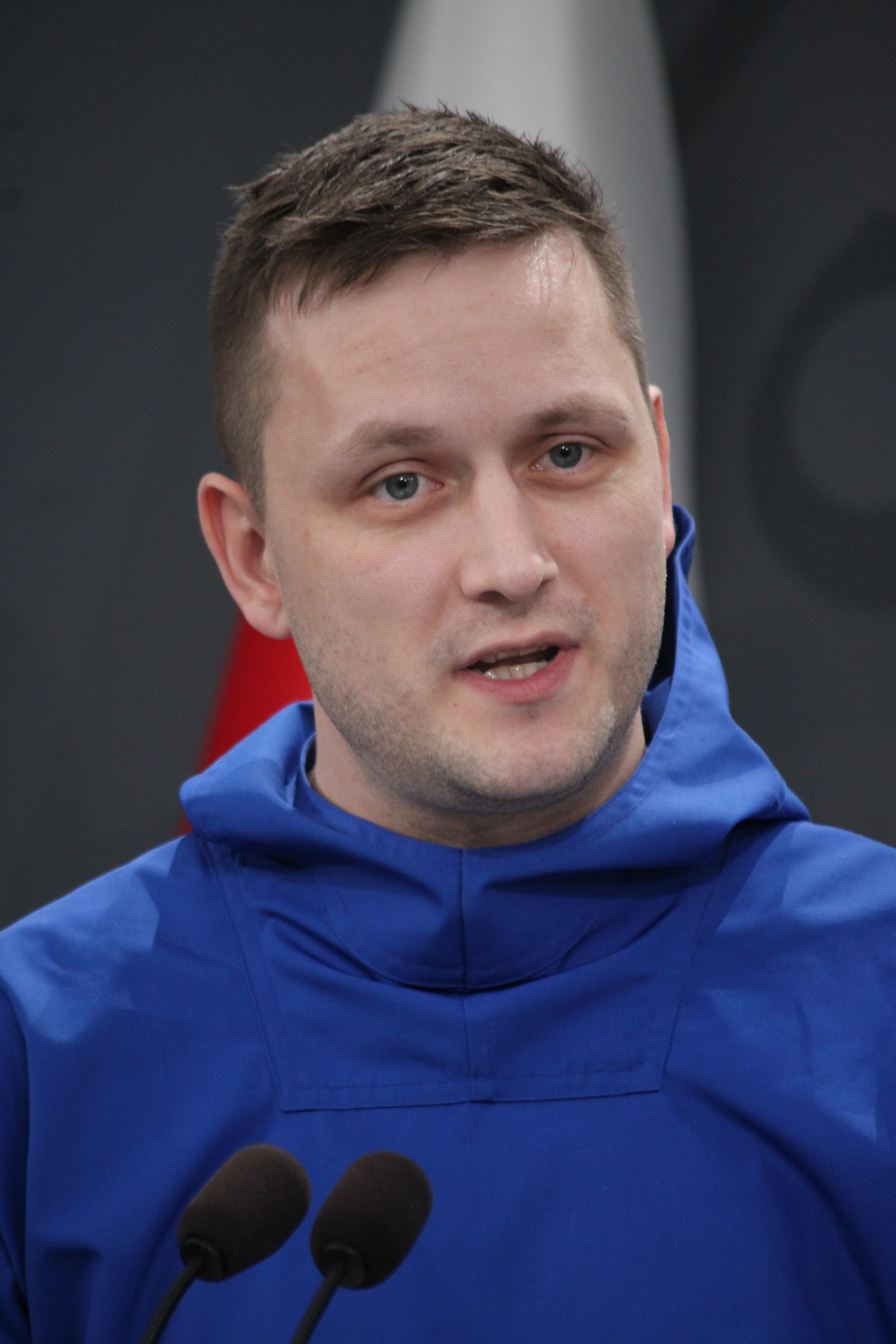
- Incumbent; Jens-Frederik Nielsen since 7 April 2025
- Government of Greenland
- Status: His Excellency (diplomatic)
- Member of: Cabinet of Greenland
- Residence: B-29
- Seat: Inatsisartut, Nuuk
- Appointer: Parliament
- Term length: Four years, renewable
- Precursor: Governor of Greenland
- Formation: 1 May 1979
- First holder: Jonathan Motzfeldt

The prime minister of Greenland (Greenlandic: Naalakkersuisut siulittaasuat, lit. 'Leader of the government'; Danish: Landsstyreformand), also known as the premier of Greenland, is the head of government of Greenland, a territory of the Kingdom of Denmark. The prime minister is usually the person who is leader of the majority party in the Parliament of Greenland (Inatsisartut). Jonathan Motzfeldt became the first prime minister after home rule was granted to Greenland in 1979. The incumbent prime minister is Jens-Frederik Nielsen.

== Difference from the prime minister of Denmark ==
Greenland's prime minister leads the domestic Greenlandic government (Naalakkersuisut) in areas transferred to self-rule, while the prime minister of Denmark leads the national government handling reserved matters (foreign policy, defense, monetary issues, citizenship, etc.). Under the 2009 Self-Government Act, Greenland controls its internal legislative and executive powers, whereas the Danish prime minister (as head of the realm's government) handles foreign affairs, defense, and other Kingdom-wide issues, with formal limits and required consultations.

Within Greenland's self-government framework, the Greenlandic prime minister implements laws in transferred policy areas. By law, Greenlandic authorities "include legislative, executive and judicial powers in those areas that are within Greenlandic competence", so the Greenlandic prime minister leads the autonomous Greenland government accountable to Greenland's parliament (Inatsisartut). In contrast, the Danish prime minister has no direct executive or legislative authority in Greenland's self-governing areas. The Self-Government Act explicitly treats "foreign, defence and security policy" as the prerogative of the Danish Government (after consulting Greenland if Greenlandic interests are involved). Thus, the Danish prime minister (via the Government) manages Denmark's foreign and security policy (limited by required Folketing consent for wars or territorial changes), whereas the Greenlandic prime minister has no role in these areas.

Specific powers the Danish prime minister/Government has regarding Greenland include: negotiating international treaties and agreements for the Kingdom (with mandatory information or consultation for those important to Greenland); deciding Greenland's defense and security policy (subject to constitutional constraints and Folketing approval); presenting bills to the Folketing that would apply to Greenland (after submitting them to the Greenland government for comment as required by the Self-Government Act); issuing administrative orders affecting Greenland (also subject to prior Greenlandic consultation); and overseeing common matters like the annual subsidy to Greenland's self-government. In the case of Greenlandic moves toward independence, the Danish prime minister must negotiate terms with Greenland's government, and any final agreement would need Inatsisartut's approval, a Greenland referendum, and Folketing consent.

== List of prime ministers of Greenland ==
No.	Portrait	Name (born–died)	Term of office			Party	Elected	Cabinet(s)
No.	Portrait	Name (born–died)	Took office	Left office	Time in office	Party	Elected	Cabinet(s)
1		Jonathan Motzfeldt (1938–2010)	1 May 1979	18 March 1991	11 years, 321 days	Siumut	1979	Motzfeldt I
1		Jonathan Motzfeldt (1938–2010)	1 May 1979	18 March 1991	11 years, 321 days	Siumut	1983	Motzfeldt II
1		Jonathan Motzfeldt (1938–2010)	1 May 1979	18 March 1991	11 years, 321 days	Siumut	1984	Motzfeldt III
1		Jonathan Motzfeldt (1938–2010)	1 May 1979	18 March 1991	11 years, 321 days	Siumut	1987	Motzfeldt IV
1		Jonathan Motzfeldt (1938–2010)	1 May 1979	18 March 1991	11 years, 321 days	Siumut	–	Motzfeldt V
2		Lars-Emil Johansen (born 1946)	18 March 1991	19 September 1997	6 years, 185 days	Siumut	1991	Johansen I
2		Lars-Emil Johansen (born 1946)	18 March 1991	19 September 1997	6 years, 185 days	Siumut	1995	Johansen II
(1)		Jonathan Motzfeldt (1938–2010)	19 September 1997	14 December 2002	5 years, 86 days	Siumut	–	Motzfeldt VI
(1)		Jonathan Motzfeldt (1938–2010)	19 September 1997	14 December 2002	5 years, 86 days	Siumut	1999	Motzfeldt VII
(1)		Jonathan Motzfeldt (1938–2010)	19 September 1997	14 December 2002	5 years, 86 days	Siumut	–	Motzfeldt VIII
3		Hans Enoksen (1956–2025)	14 December 2002	12 June 2009	6 years, 180 days	Siumut	2002	Enoksen I
3		Hans Enoksen (1956–2025)	14 December 2002	12 June 2009	6 years, 180 days	Siumut	–	Enoksen II
3		Hans Enoksen (1956–2025)	14 December 2002	12 June 2009	6 years, 180 days	Siumut	–	Enoksen III
3		Hans Enoksen (1956–2025)	14 December 2002	12 June 2009	6 years, 180 days	Siumut	2005	Enoksen IV
3		Hans Enoksen (1956–2025)	14 December 2002	12 June 2009	6 years, 180 days	Siumut	–	Enoksen V
4		Kuupik Kleist (born 1958)	12 June 2009	5 April 2013	3 years, 297 days	Inuit Ataqatigiit	2009	Kleist
5		Aleqa Hammond (born 1965)	5 April 2013	30 September 2014	1 year, 178 days	Siumut	2013	Hammond I
5		Aleqa Hammond (born 1965)	5 April 2013	30 September 2014	1 year, 178 days	Siumut	–	Hammond II
6		Kim Kielsen (born 1966)	30 September 2014	23 April 2021	6 years, 205 days	Siumut	–	Kielsen I
6		Kim Kielsen (born 1966)	30 September 2014	23 April 2021	6 years, 205 days	Siumut	2014	Kielsen II
6		Kim Kielsen (born 1966)	30 September 2014	23 April 2021	6 years, 205 days	Siumut	–	Kielsen III
6		Kim Kielsen (born 1966)	30 September 2014	23 April 2021	6 years, 205 days	Siumut	2018	Kielsen IV
6		Kim Kielsen (born 1966)	30 September 2014	23 April 2021	6 years, 205 days	Siumut	–	Kielsen V
6		Kim Kielsen (born 1966)	30 September 2014	23 April 2021	6 years, 205 days	Siumut	–	Kielsen VI
6		Kim Kielsen (born 1966)	30 September 2014	23 April 2021	6 years, 205 days	Siumut	–	Kielsen VII
7		Múte Bourup Egede (born 1987)	23 April 2021	7 April 2025	3 years, 349 days	Inuit Ataqatigiit	2021	Egede I
7		Múte Bourup Egede (born 1987)	23 April 2021	7 April 2025	3 years, 349 days	Inuit Ataqatigiit	–	Egede II
8		Jens-Frederik Nielsen (born 1991)	7 April 2025	Incumbent	1 year, 153 days	Democrats	2025	Nielsen

== See also ==
- List of governors of Greenland
