= 1984 Greenlandic general election =

- 6 June 1984
- All 25 seats in the Inatsisartut; 13 seats needed for a majority
- Turnout: 66.76% (▼7.47 pp)
Party	Leader	Vote %	Seats	+/–
Siumut	Jonathan Motzfeldt	44.11%	11	−1
Atassut	Lars Chemnitz	43.77%	11	−1
Inuit Ataqatigiit	Aqqaluk Lynge	12.11%	3	+1
This lists parties that won seats. See the complete results below.
Prime Minister before	Prime Minister after
Jonathan Motzfeldt; Siumut	Jonathan Motzfeldt; Siumut

General elections were held in Greenland on 6 June 1984. Siumut and Atassut both won 11 seats in the 25-seat Parliament. The elections were held part-way through the negotiations of Greenland's exit from the European Economic Community.

== Results ==
Party	Votes	%	Seats	+/–
Siumut	9,949	44.11	11	–1
Atassut	9,873	43.77	11	–1
Inuit Ataqatigiit	2,732	12.11	3	+1
Total	22,554	100.00	25	–1
Valid votes	22,554	97.69		
Invalid/blank votes	534	2.31		
Total votes	23,088	100.00		
Registered voters/turnout	34,582	66.76		
Source: Election Passport, Parties & Elections
