= Women's Party (Greenland) =

Women's Party Arnat Partiiat
- Founded: 6 November 1999; 26 years ago
- Dissolved: 2008; 18 years ago
- Ideology: Feminism

Website
- arnat-partiiat.gl (archived)

The Women's Party (Greenlandic: Arnat Partiiat, Danish: Kvindepartiet) was a feminist political party in Greenland inspired by the Icelandic women's movement. The party was formed by a group of women in response to the low representation of women in politics. At the 2002 legislative elections, the party won 2.4% of the popular vote and no seats. It was dissolved in the spring of 2008.
