= Augusta Salling =

Greenlandic politician (born 1954)

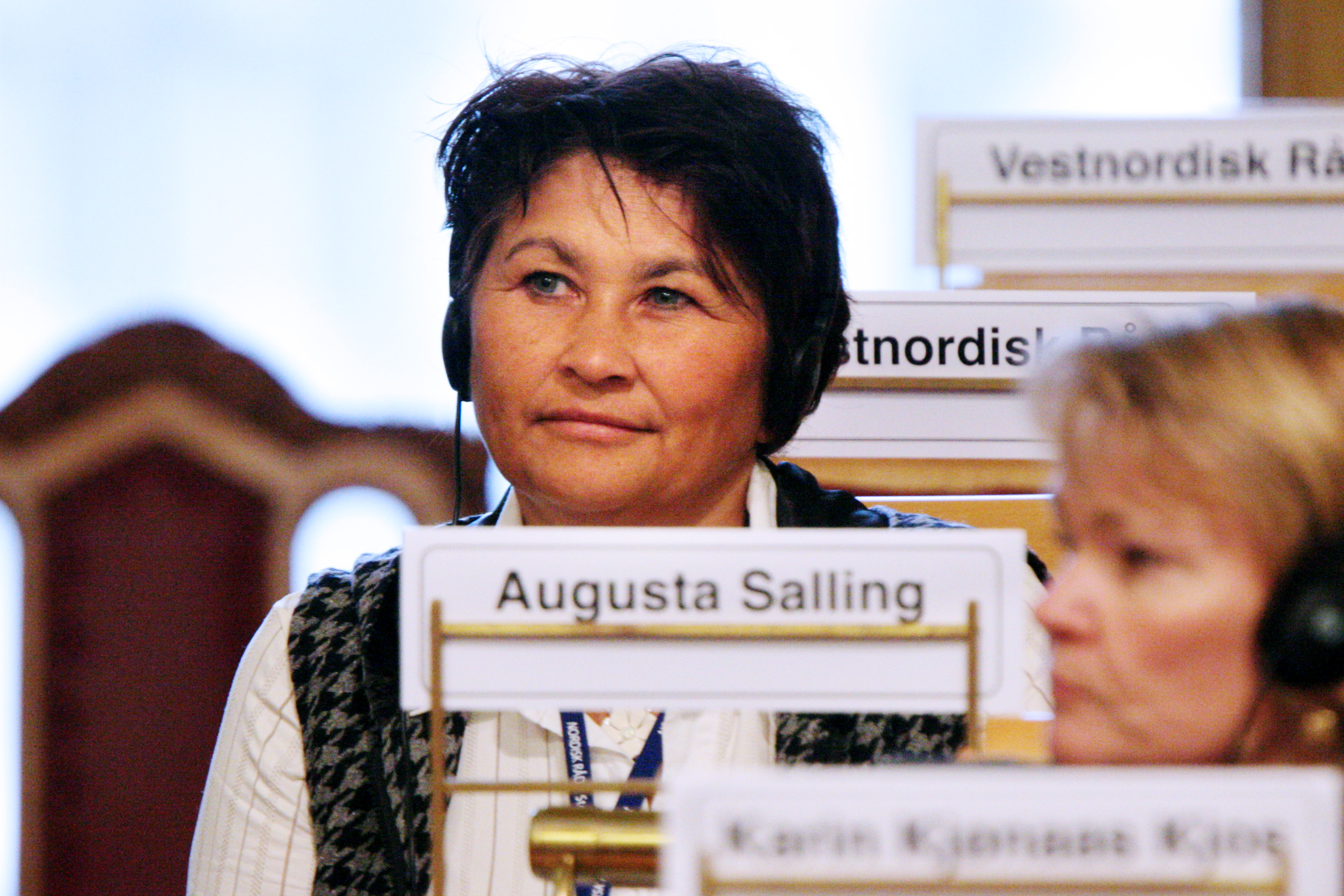

Augusta Salling (born 1954) is a former finance minister of Greenland. She began as a teacher. Her political roles before finance minister included being a member of a Parliament and mayor of Qeqertarsuaq from 1993 to 1997. In 2003 she refused to step down over a budgeting error she stated was not her fault. This led to the collapse of the governing coalition. She is a member of Feeling of Community.
