= Per Berthelsen =

Greenlandic politician (born 1950)

Per Berthelsen (born 12 February 1950) is a Greenlandic politician and musician.

He was first elected to the municipal council in Nuuk Municipality in 1993, and was first elected to the national parliament in 1993 as a member for Siumut. In 2002, he broke with Siumut to found Demokraatit (Democrats), where he served as party leader. He left the party in 2008 and returned to Siumut. In the 2025 Greenlandic elections, he was re-elected on the Demokraatit list. He is considered a moderate voice in the debate around Greenlandic independence.

He was one of the founding members of the pioneering Greenlandic rock band Sumé.
