= Hans Enoksen =

Prime Minister of Greenland from 2002 to 2009

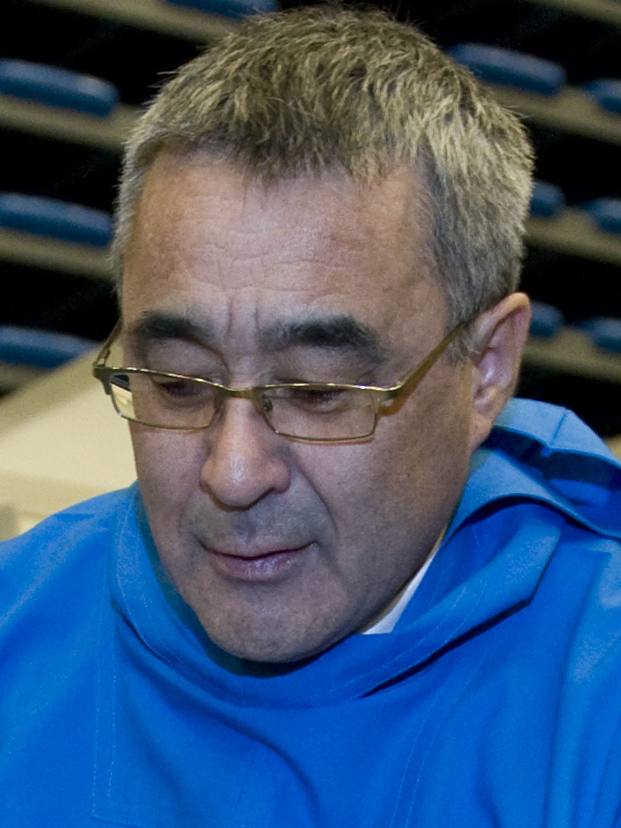
- Enoksen in 2008

Prime Minister of Greenland
- In office 14 December 2002 – 12 June 2009
- Monarch: Margrethe II
- Preceded by: Jonathan Motzfeldt
- Succeeded by: Kuupik Kleist

Member of the Landsting for Kullorsuaq
- In office 27 May 1987 – 17 September 2025

Personal details
- Born: 7 August 1956 Itilleq, County of Greenland, Denmark
- Died: 17 September 2025 (aged 69) Nuuk, Greenland
- Citizenship: Kingdom of Denmark
- Party: Naleraq
- Other political affiliations: Siumut (1977–2013)

Hans Enoksen (7 August 1956 – 17 September 2025) was a Greenlandic politician who was a member of the Parliament of Greenland beginning in 1995, and was prime minister of Greenland from 2002 to 2009.

== Life and career ==
A unilingual Greenlandic speaker, he became Minister for Fisheries, Hunting and Settlements and chairman of the political party Siumut in 2001.

Siumut won just 28% in the 2002 general election, down from 35% in the 1999 election. But they again won the biggest number of seats, 10 out of 31, and formed a coalition with left-wing party Inuit Ataqatigiit, with Enoksen becoming prime minister on 14 December 2002. The two parties began discussing how to change the agreement with Denmark and the United States about how much Greenland should receive in compensation for the U.S.'s Thule Air Base in the north of the country.

In the 2009 election, Inuit Ataqatigiit beat him with 43% of the vote compared to Enoksen's party's 26%. Enoksen retired as leader of Siumut.

Enoksen was re-elected in the 2013 election, but in January 2014 he was so dissatisfied with Siumut's politics that he left them and established a new political party, Partii Naleraq. The new party won 11.6% of the valid votes at the elections on 28 November 2014, and got three members elected for the Greenlandic parliament. Enoksen got 2,425 personal votes.

He was Speaker of the Inatsisartut in 2018.

Enoksen died at Queen Ingrid's Hospital on 17 September 2025, at the age of 69.

Political offices
| Preceded by Jonathan Motzfeldt | Prime Minister of Greenland; 2002–2009 | Succeeded by Kuupik Kleist |
