= Atassut =

Political party in Greenland

- Abbreviation: A
- Leader: Aqqalu Jerimiassen
- Founded: 29 April 1978
- Headquarters: Nuuk, Greenland
- Youth wing: Atassutip Inuusuttai (Atassut Youth)
- Ideology: Liberal conservatism Conservative liberalism Danish unionism
- Political position: Centre-right
- National affiliation: Venstre
- Nordic affiliation: Centre Group
- Colours: Verdigris (Note: Since 2019); Blue (Note: Prior to 2019)
- Inatsisartut: 2 / 31
- Municipalities: 4 / 81
- Folketing (Greenland seats): 0 / 2

Election symbol
- A

Website
- www.atassut.gl

Atassut (English: Cohesion/Link/Togetherness/Solidarity, also referred to as Feeling of Community) is a liberal-conservative and unionist political party in Greenland. Founded on 29 April 1978, Atassut is an established partner of Venstre.

== History ==
Party logo until December 2024

Atassut was established in late 1976 as a political movement of conservative and unionist forces in Greenland to oppose Siumut with Lars Chemnitz as its leading figure; however, it soon became more liberal.

Its first programme from January 1977 stated that its purpose was to "promote Greenlandic home rule within the Unity of the Realm" and "work against secession from the Danish realm."

Atassut was founded as a political party on 29 April 1978. The party's name literally translates as "link" (in the context of being linked with Denmark as part of the Danish realm), but can also refer to a roof which binds a house together.

Previously one of the two largest and most influential political parties in Greenland, the Atassut has seen its share of the popular vote consistently decline since the mid-1990s.

In the 2001 Folketing election, the party lost its only representative and has never regained a seat in the Danish parliament.

In the June 2009 snap election, the party dropped to 10.9% of the vote; it lost three of its six seats. In the following election in 2013, the party was reduced to two seats, which they maintained in the 2014 elections despite fewer votes. Both MPs later defected to Siumut, one of whom was its chairman Knud Kristiansen.

From the 2014 parliamentary election to 2016, Atassut was a part of a coalition government, led by Kim Kielsen from Siumut, that also including the Inuit Ataqatigiit.

In debate of refugees in Greenland in 2017, Atassut and Atassut Youths have been strong on not accepting refugees in to Greenland, where Inuit Ataqatigiit and Siumut want to take in refugees.

In the 2018 general election, Atassut gained two seats in the Inatsisartut despite having no incumbents after both their MPs had defected to Siumut. In the 2021 election, Atassut retained its two seats. Following the election, Atassut offered external support to the governing coalition formed by the Inuit Ataqatigiit and Naleraq parties.

== Ideology ==
Atassut has been referred to as liberal, conservative, and liberal-conservative. The party supports privatisation of public industries, a form of citizen's income, NATO co-operation, and Greenlandic affiliation with the European Union.

The party was previously opposed to Greenlandic home rule; Atassut later shifted to supporting home rule and autonomy, but without leaving the unity of the Realm. The party has moved from a traditional right-wing position towards later supporting the subsidisation of primary-sector business, alongside the centre-left Siumut party.

== Election results ==
=== Inatsisartut ===
Election	Votes	%	Seats	+/–	Position	Status
1979	7,688	41.7	8 / 21	New	▲2nd	Opposition
1983	11,443	46.6	12 / 26	▲4	▲1st	Opposition
1984	9,873	43.8	11 / 25	▼1	▼2nd	Opposition
1987	10,044	40.1	11 / 27	Steady	▲1st	Opposition (1987–1988)
1987	10,044	40.1	11 / 27	Steady	▲1st	External support (1988–1991)
1991	7,536	30.1	8 / 27	▼3	▼2nd	Opposition
1995	7,674	30.1	10 / 31	▲2	2nd	Coalition
1999	7,100	25.2	8 / 31	▼2	2nd	Opposition (1999–2001)
1999	7,100	25.2	8 / 31	▼2	2nd	Coalition (2001–2002)
2002	5,780	20.2	7 / 31	▼1	▼3rd	Opposition (2002–2003)
2002	5,780	20.2	7 / 31	▼1	▼3rd	Coalition (2003)
2002	5,780	20.2	7 / 31	▼1	▼3rd	Opposition (2003–2005)
2005	5,528	19.1	6 / 31	▼1	▼4th	Coalition
2009	3,094	10.9	3 / 31	▼3	4th	Coalition
2013	2,454	8.1	2 / 31	▼1	▲3rd	Coalition (2013–2014)
2013	2,454	8.1	2 / 31	▼1	▲3rd	Opposition (2014)
2014	1,919	6.5	2 / 31	Steady	▼5th	Coalition (2014–2016)
2014	1,919	6.5	2 / 31	Steady	▼5th	Opposition (2016–2018)
2018	1,730	5.9	2 / 31	Steady	5th	External support (2018)
2018	1,730	5.9	2 / 31	Steady	5th	Coalition (2018–2020)
2018	1,730	5.9	2 / 31	Steady	5th	Opposition (2020–2021)
2021	1,878	7.1	2 / 31	Steady	5th	Opposition
2025	2,092	7.4	2 / 31	Steady	5th	Coalition

=== Folketing ===
Election	Greenland				
Election	Votes	%	Seats	+/–	Position
1979	6,390	44.9	1 / 2	New	▲1st
1981	9,223	48.9	1 / 2	Steady	1st
1984	9,308	43.5	1 / 2	Steady	1st
1987	6,627	41.3	1 / 2	Steady	▼2nd
1988	8,135	38.7	1 / 2	Steady	2nd
1990	7,087	36.6	1 / 2	Steady	2nd
1994	7,501	34.7	1 / 2	Steady	2nd
1998	8,569	36.0	1 / 2	Steady	2nd
2001	5,138	22.1	0 / 2	▼1	▼3rd
2005	3,774	16.4	0 / 2	Steady	▼4th
2007	4,094	16.3	0 / 2	Steady	4th
2011	1,706	7.6	0 / 2	Steady	4th
2015	1,528	7.6	0 / 2	Steady	4th
2019	1,098	5.5	0 / 2	Steady	▼6th
2022	720	3.7	0 / 2	Steady	▲5th
2026	2,290	10.92	0 / 2	Steady	5th

Atassut was already established as a political movement at the time of the Folketing election on 15 February 1977, and the three Atassut founders Arqalo Abelsen, Ole Berglund and Otto Steenholdt ran as an association of candidates, which got 8,391 votes and Otto Steenholdt elected.

== Leaders ==
- 2019– Aqqalu Jerimiassen
- 2017–2019 Siverth K. Heilmann
- 2017 Qulutannguaq Inuk Berthelsen (acting; after Knud Kristiansen left the party)
- 2014–2017 Knud Kristiansen
- 2009–2014 Gerhardt Petersen
- 2005–2009 Finn Karlsen
- 2002–2005 Augusta Salling
- 1993–2002 Daniel Skifte
- 1989–1993 Konrad Steenholdt
- 1985–1989 Otto Steenholdt
- 1979–1984 Lars Chemnitz
