= Jens B. Frederiksen =

Greenlandic politician

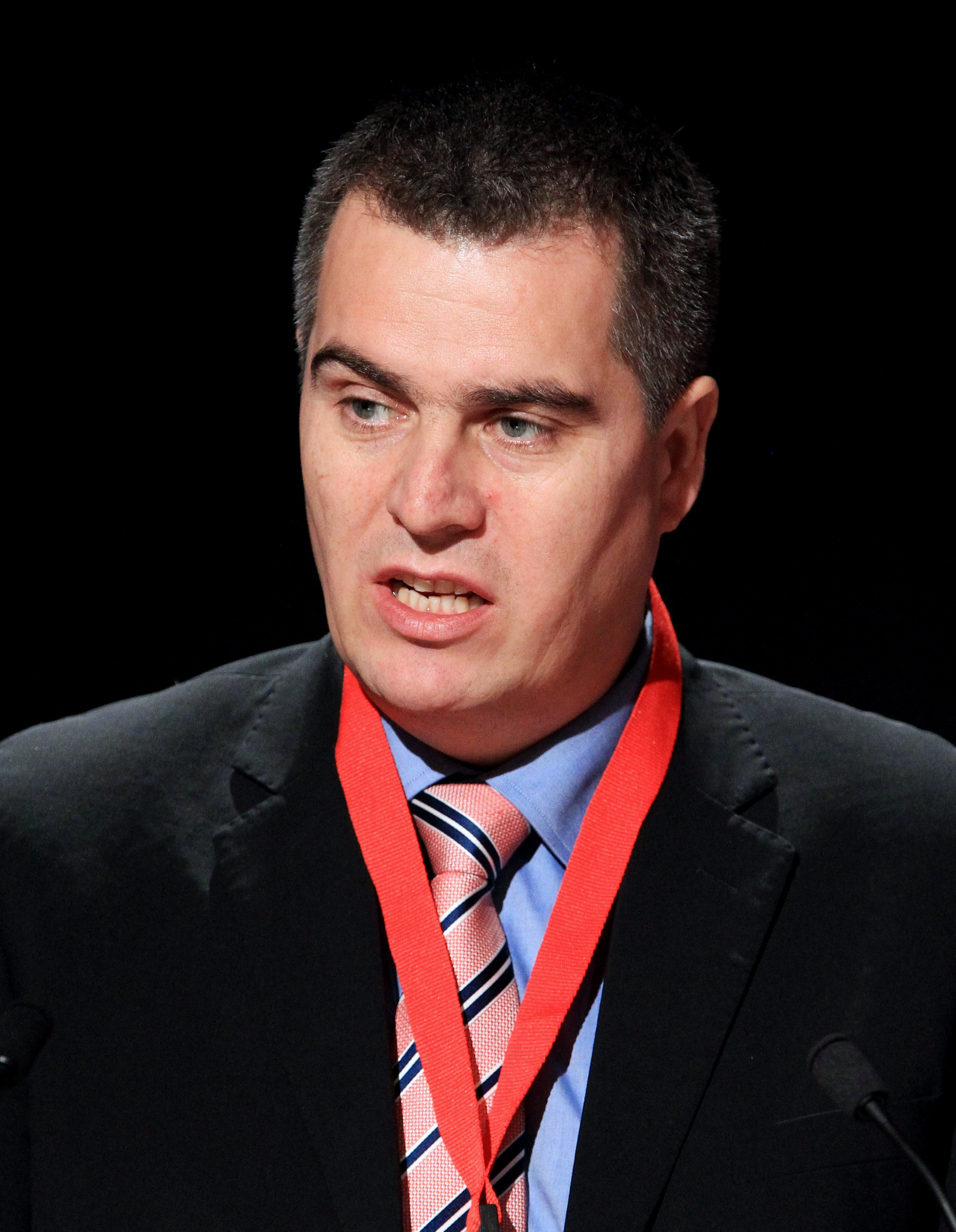
Jens B. Frederiksen in 2010

Jens Blidorf Frederiksen is a Greenlandic politician. He is the former leader of the Democrats and former Minister for Housing, Infrastructure and Transport, and former Deputy-Premier.
