= Association of Candidates =

Association of Candidates Kattusseqatigiit
- Leader: Anthon Frederiksen
- Founded: 2005
- Dissolved: 2013
- Headquarters: Nuuk, Sermersooq
- Ideology: Conservatism
- Political position: Centre-right
- Colours: Yellow
- Landsting: 0 / 31
- Folketing (Greenland seats): 0 / 2

Website
- www.kattusseqatigiit.gl/

The Association of Candidates (Kattusseqatigiit) was a conservative political party in Greenland. The party was founded in the late autumn months of 2005, when the chairman Anthon Frederiksen delivered 1,003 signatures to the Home Rule domestic office.

In the parliamentary elections in 2013, the party won 1.1% of the popular vote and no seats in the Greenlandic parliament; subsequently, the party dissolved. Its founder Anthon Frederiksen later joined Partii Naleraq.

== Election results ==
=== Parliament of Greenland (Inatsisartut) ===
Election year	# of overall votes	% of overall vote	# of overall seats won	±
1995	1,193	4.7 (#5)	1 / 31	New
1999	3,453	12.3 (#4)	4 / 31	▲3
2002	1,510	5.3 (#5)	1 / 31	▼3
2005	1,385	4.1 (#5)	1 / 31	0
2009	1,084	3.8 (#5)	1 / 31	0
2013	326	1.1 (#6)	0 / 31	▼1

- Originally entered into the Greenland Parliament as Independents.
