= Democrats (Greenland) =

Political party in Greenland

Democrats Demokraatit (Greenlandic) Demokraterne (Danish)
- Abbreviation: D
- Chairman: Jens-Frederik Nielsen
- Vice Chair for Politics: Steen Lynge
- Vice Chair for Organisation: Nivi Olsen
- Founded: 28 November 2002
- Headquarters: Inatsisartut, 3900 Nuuk
- Youth wing: Demokraatit Inuusuttaat
- Ideology: Liberalism; Social liberalism; Factions: Greenlandic independence; Danish unionism
- Political position: Centre to centre-right
- National affiliation: Liberal Alliance (since 2025); Historical: Danish Social Liberal Party (2012–2025); Conservative People's Party (2007–2010)
- Nordic affiliation: Centre Group
- Colors: Dark blue Red; White
- Inatsisartut: 11 / 31
- Municipalities: 21 / 81
- Mayors: 2 / 5
- Folketing (Greenland seats): 0 / 2

Website
- www.demokraatit.gl

The Democrats (Greenlandic: Demokraatit [temokʁaːt͡sit]; Danish: Demokraterne, D), also known as the Democratic Party, is a social liberal political party in Greenland. Historically a unionist party, the Democrats have traditionally been sceptical of Greenlandic independence and even further self-governance. The party's position has shifted to remaining within the Danish Realm for the foreseeable future, with independence as the end goal of a gradual process that starts with increased self-determination. Two of the major priorities in its programme are improving educational standards and the housing situation.

== History ==
Established in 2002, the party won five seats in the elections that year. It increased its seat total to seven in the 2005 elections, but was excluded from power by a so-called "Northern Lights Coalition" of Siumut, Inuit Ataqatigiit and Atassut. Its number of seats decreased to four in the 2009 elections; however, it entered a government coalition with Inuit Ataqatigiit and the Association of Candidates, removing the formerly dominant Siumut from power for the first time in its history.

In the 2013 elections, the party won only two seats, but gained two more seats at the 2014 elections. In the 2018 elections, the party gained an additional two seats. It shrank to three in the 2021 elections.

The party had its best election results in the 2025 elections, when it became Greenland's largest party for the first time, more than tripling their seats. and Nielsen received 4,850 personal votes. Incumbent Prime Minister Múte Bourup Egede received 3,276 votes.

Shortly before Vice President of the United States JD Vance and his wife Usha arrived to visit the Pituffik Space Base in Greenland on 29 March 2025, a four-party coalition government was announced by Nielsen.

== Leaders ==
In 2020, Jens-Frederik Nielsen was elected to succeed Niels Thomsen as chair of the party. He was reelected to the role in March 2024, and became prime minister of Greenland in March 2025.

== Positions ==
The party supports a more gradual process of gaining independence from Denmark compared to Naleraq, Inuit Ataqatigiit and Siumut, not wanting to pursue full independence until Greenland is self sufficient.

The party has opposed US President Donald Trump's threats to invade Greenland.

== Election results ==
=== Inatsisartut ===
Election	Votes	%	Seats	+/–	Position	Status
2002	4,558	15.9	5 / 31	New	▲4th	Opposition
2005	6,595	22.8	7 / 31	▲2	▲2nd	Opposition
2009	3,620	12.7	4 / 31	▼3	▼3rd	Coalition
2013	1,870	6.2	2 / 31	▼2	▼5th	Opposition
2014	3,469	11.8	4 / 31	▲2	▲3rd	Coalition (2014–2016)
2014	3,469	11.8	4 / 31	▲2	▲3rd	Opposition (2016–2018)
2018	5,712	19.5	6 / 31	▲2	3rd	Opposition (2018)
2018	5,712	19.5	6 / 31	▲2	3rd	External support (2018–2020)
2018	5,712	19.5	6 / 31	▲2	3rd	Coalition (2020–2021)
2021	2,454	9.3	3 / 31	▼3	▼4th	Opposition
2025	8,563	30.3	10 / 31	▲7	▲1st	Coalition

=== Folketing ===
Election	Greenland				
Election	Votes	%	Seats	+/–	Position
2005	4,909	21.7	0 / 2	Steady	▲3rd
2007	4,584	18.5	0 / 2	Steady	3rd
2011	2,882	12.6	0 / 2	Steady	3rd
2015	1,753	8.5	0 / 2	Steady	3rd
2019	2,258	11.0	0 / 2	Steady	3rd
2022	3,656	19.0	0 / 2	Steady	3rd
2026	3,767	17.96	0 / 2	Steady	3rd
