= Finn Karlsen =

Greenlandic politician

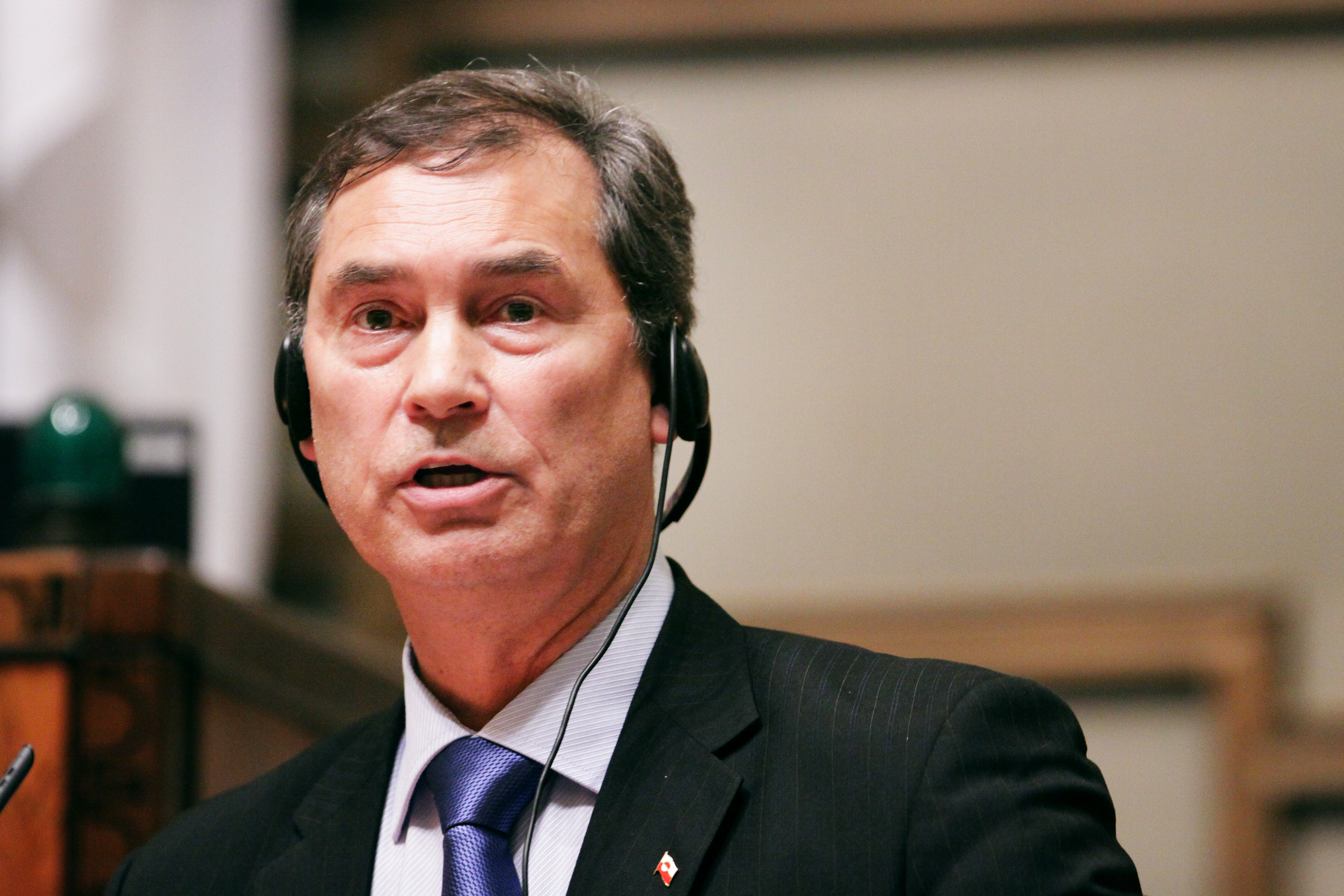

Finn Karlsen (born 1952 in Upernavik) is a Greenlandic politician. He represents the Atassut party.

His political career started in 1989, when he was elected to the municipal council of Narsaq Municipality. He took his seat in the Landstinget (Parliament) in 1995, and became Environment Minister in 2003, and Fishery and Food Minister in 2005.

In November 2007, he became Minister for Fisheries, Food, and Land Use.
