= Siumut =

Political party in Greenland

Forward Siumut
- Abbreviation: SIU
- Chairperson: Aleqa Hammond
- Founded: 29 July 1977
- Headquarters: Nuuk
- Youth wing: Siumut Youth
- Ideology: Social democracy; Greenlandic independence
- Political position: Centre-left
- National affiliation: Social Democrats
- International affiliation: Socialist International (consultative 1986–2012, observer 2012–2014)
- Nordic affiliation: SAMAK; The Social Democratic Group
- Colours: Red (Note: Since 2021); Gold (Note: Prior to 2021)
- Inatsisartut: 2 / 31
- Municipalities: 31 / 81
- Mayors: 2 / 5
- Folketing (Greenland seats): 0 / 2

Election symbol

Website
- www.siumut.gl

Siumut (SIU, Greenlandic: Siumut [siumut]; Danish: Fremad; lit. 'Forward') is a social democratic political party in Greenland. Historically the most dominant party in Greenland, it led governments from the establishment of home rule in 1979 until 2009, and again from 2013 to 2021. Siumut is led by Aleqa Hammond, who succeeded the previous leader Erik Jensen in 2025. Party members have been elected to both the Inatsisartut (or Landstinget, the Parliament of Greenland) and the Folketinget (the Parliament of the Kingdom of Denmark).

== History ==
Siumut was formed in 1971 as a political movement, and became a party in 1977. Following the establishment of home rule in Greenland in January 1979, the party won 13 of 21 seats in the 1979 Greenlandic general election for the newly formed Parliament of Greenland (Inatsisartut), and party chairman Jonathan Motzfeldt became the first Prime Minister of Greenland.

Following the 1991 Greenlandic general election, Motzfeldt stepped down and was replaced by Lars Emil Johansen, also of Siumut, who governed in coalition with Inuit Ataqatigiit.

Between 1997 and 2002, Motzfeldt was again Prime Minister, until he was succeeded by Hans Enoksen. In the 15 November 2005 general election, the party won 30.7% of the popular vote and 10 out of 31 seats in the parliament. In the 2009 general election, it won 26.5% of the popular vote and nine seats, but the further left and more nationalist Inuit Ataqatigiit won 14 seats and 44% of the popular vote, a landslide victory. Enoksen resigned as party leader and Prime Minister.

Under new party leader Aleqa Hammond, the 2013 election saw Siumut win 42.8% of the popular vote and 14 out of 31 seats, and form a coalition with support of the unionist Atassut and the eco-socialist Inuit Party. The coalition collapsed in 2014, triggering a new election that year. Siumut remained the largest party in the Inatsisartut, but won three fewer seats. New party leader Kim Kielsen replaced Hammond as Prime Minister, forming a coalition with Atassut and the Democrats. Siumut further declined to nine seats in the 2018 Greenlandic general election, though Kielsen was able to lead another coalition. The party gained one seat at the 2021 election, but Inuit Ataqatigiit surpassed Siumut to become the largest party in the Inatsisartut and Kielsen was replaced as Prime Minister by IA's Múte Bourup Egede.

On 10 February 2025, Folketing member Aki-Matilda Høegh-Dam departed Siumut and joined Naleraq, claiming that Siumut was insufficiently committed to Greenlandic independence. Her departure meant Siumut was unrepresented in the Folketing for the first time since 1998. The next month, Siumut suffered an historic defeat at the 2025 general election, winning just four seats and falling to fourth place in the Inatsisartut; the party had never had fewer than nine seats and had never been smaller than the second-largest party in the Inatsisartut. Siumut did ultimately join the Democrats-led governing coalition, which included four of the five parties in the Inatsisartut.

== Positions ==
The party was an observer affiliate of the Socialist International.

Siumut representatives sitting in the Folketinget (the Danish parliament) have been attached to the parliamentary group of the Social Democrats.

== Election results ==
=== Inatsisartut ===
Election	Votes	%	Seats	+/–	Position	Status
1979	8,505	46.1	13 / 21	New	▲1st	Majority
1983	10,371	42.3	12 / 26	▼1	▼2nd	Minority
1984	9,949	44.1	11 / 25	▼1	▲1st	Coalition
1987	9,987	39.8	11 / 27	Steady	▼2nd	Coalition (1987–1988)
1987	9,987	39.8	11 / 27	Steady	▼2nd	Minority (1988–1991)
1991	9,336	37.3	11 / 27	Steady	▲1st	Coalition
1995	9,803	38.4	12 / 31	▲1	1st	Coalition
1999	9,899	35.2	11 / 31	▼1	1st	Coalition
2002	8,151	28.5	10 / 31	▼1	1st	Coalition
2005	8,861	30.7	10 / 31	Steady	1st	Coalition
2009	7,567	26.5	9 / 31	▼1	▼2nd	Opposition
2013	12,910	42.8	14 / 31	▲5	▲1st	Coalition (2013–2014)
2013	12,910	42.8	14 / 31	▲5	▲1st	Minority (2014)
2014	10,108	34.3	11 / 31	▼3	1st	Coalition
2018	7,959	27.2	9 / 31	▼2	1st	Coalition
2021	7,986	30.1	10 / 31	▲1	▼2nd	Opposition (2021–2022)
2021	7,986	30.1	10 / 31	▲1	▼2nd	Coalition (2022–2025)
2025	4,210	14.9	4 / 31	▼6	▼4th	Opposition

=== Folketing ===
Election	Greenland				
Election	Votes	%	Seats	+/–	Position
1979	6,273	44.1	1 / 2	New	▲2nd
1981	7,176	37.7	1 / 2	Steady	2nd
1984	9,148	42.6	1 / 2	Steady	2nd
1987	6,944	43.3	1 / 2	Steady	▲1st
1988	8,415	40.1	1 / 2	Steady	1st
1990	8,272	42.8	1 / 2	Steady	1st
1994	did not contest (Note: In the 1994 Danish general election, an independent won a seat in the Danish Parliament, but it seems the Siumut party did not contest that particular election.)				
1998	8,502	36.5	1 / 2	▲1	▲1st
2001	8,272	25.9	1 / 2	Steady	▼2nd
2005	7,761	34.3	1 / 2	Steady	▲1st
2007	8,068	32.5	1 / 2	Steady	1st
2011	8,499	37.1	1 / 2	Steady	▼2nd
2015	7,831	38.2	1 / 2	Steady	2nd
2019	6,058	29.4	1 / 2	Steady	2nd
2022	7,424	38.6	1 / 2	Steady	▲1st
2026	3,515	16.76	0 / 2	▼1	▼4th

== Party leaders ==
#	Leader	Term of office		Prime Minister
1	Jonathan Motzfeldt	29 July 1977	1978	1979–1991
2	Moses Olsen	1978		-
(1)	Jonathan Motzfeldt	1978	1979	1979–1991
3	Lars-Emil Johansen	1979	1980	-
(1)	Jonathan Motzfeldt	1980	12 August 1987	1979–1991
(3)	Lars-Emil Johansen	12 August 1987	September 1997	1991–1997
4	Mikael Petersen	September 1997	26 May 1998	-
(1)	Jonathan Motzfeldt	26 May 1998	17 September 2001	1997–2002
5	Hans Enoksen	17 September 2001	8 June 2009	2002–2009
6	Aleqa Hammond	8 June 2009	18 October 2014	2013–2014
7	Kim Kielsen	18 October 2014	29 November 2020	2014–2021
8	Erik Jensen	29 November 2020	12 March 2025	-
-	Vivian Motzfeldt (interim)	12 March 2025	29 June 2025	-
(6)	Aleqa Hammond	29 June 2025	Incumbent	
