= Anthon Frederiksen =

Greenlandic politician

Anthon Frederikssen is a Greenlandic politician and the leader of the Kattusseqatigiit Party. He was previously the Minister for Domestic Affairs, Nature and Environment.
