= Jonathan Motzfeldt =

Prime Minister of Greenland (1979–1991; 1997–2002)

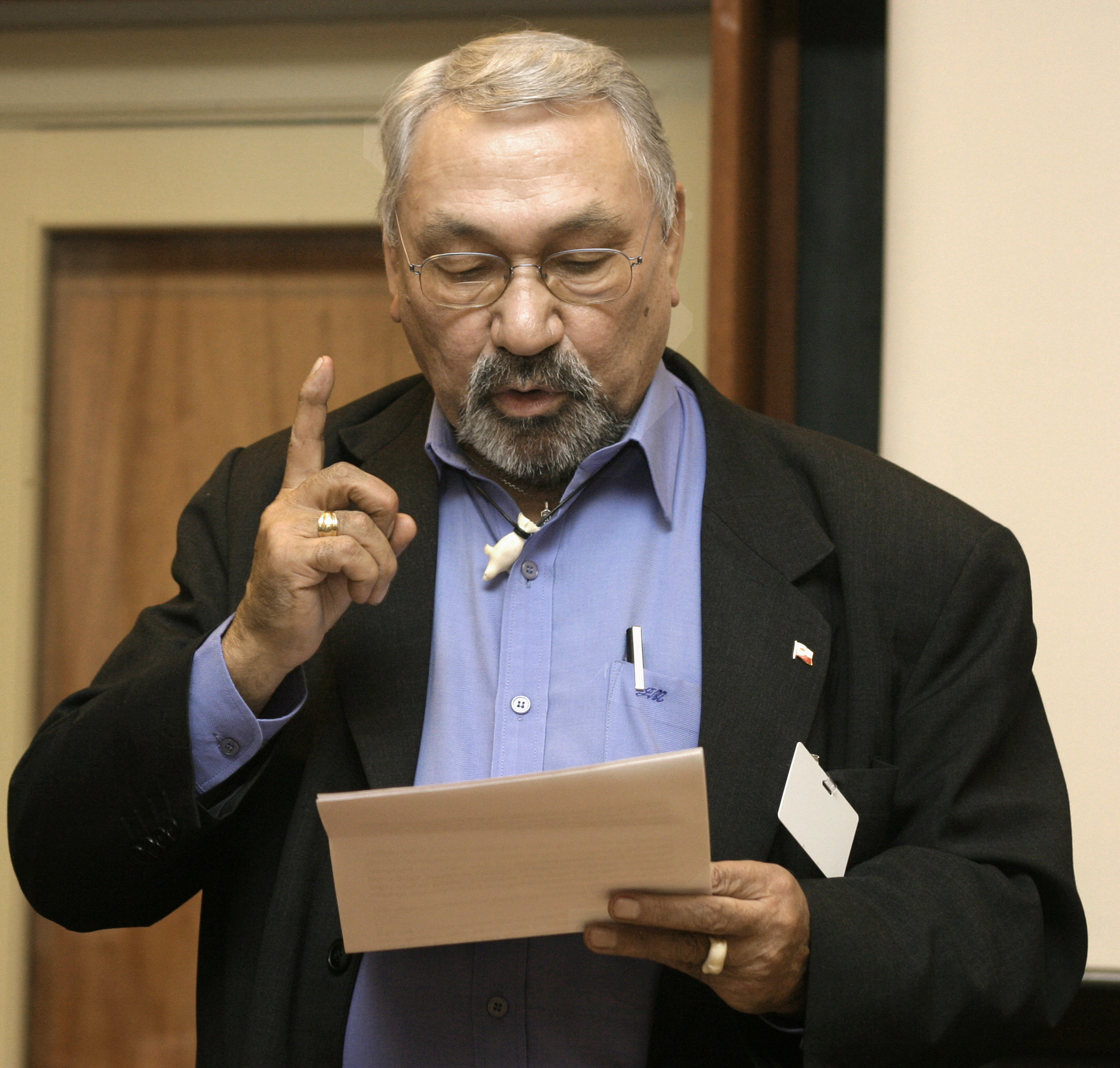
- Motzfeldt in 2003

Prime Minister of Greenland
- In office 19 September 1997 – 14 December 2002
- Monarch: Margrethe II
- Preceded by: Lars Emil Johansen
- Succeeded by: Hans Enoksen
- In office 1 May 1979 – 18 March 1991
- Monarch: Margrethe II
- Preceded by: Hans Lassen as Governor
- Succeeded by: Lars Emil Johansen

Member of the Landsting for Nanortalik
- In office 1 May 1979 – 2 June 2009
- Preceded by: Position Established
- Succeeded by: Anders Olsen

Personal details
- Born: 25 September 1938 Qagssimiut, South Greenland
- Died: 28 October 2010 (aged 72) Qaqortoq, Kujalleq, Greenland
- Citizenship: Kingdom of Denmark
- Party: Siumut
- Spouse: Kristjana Guðrún Guðmundsdóttir (m. 1992)
- Children: 2
- Education: University of Copenhagen
- Occupation: Priest, politician

Jonathan Jakob Jørgen Otto Motzfeldt (25 September 1938 – 28 October 2010) was a Greenlandic priest and politician. He is considered one of the leading figures in the establishment of Greenland Home Rule. Jonathan Motzfeldt was the first prime minister of Greenland. He was Greenland's prime minister from 1979 until 1991 and 1997 until 2002. He is Greenland's longest-serving prime minister and won the most elections of any Greenlandic prime minister. He is considered a centre-left politician and Greenland became a recognized country during his tenure.

== Personal life ==
Jonathan "Junnuk" Motzfeldt was born in 1938 in the settlement of Qassimiut in southern Greenland as son to the hunter Søren Motzfeldt (1902–1984) and Kirsten Klemmensen (1904–1979).

After his teacher's exam at Ilinniarfissuaq (Greenland College) in Nuuk in 1960, he studied theology at the University of Copenhagen until 1966, subsequently working as a pastor in Qaqortoq, Greenland until 1979.

In 1992, Jonathan Motzfeldt married Kristjana Guðrún Guðmundsdóttir (born 1951) from Iceland. They had no children. However, from a previous marriage with Margit Kock Petersen, he had two children: Karen Motzfeldt (born 1966) and Claus Motzfeldt (born 1969). Greenlandic handball player Hans Peter Motzfeldt-Kyed is Motzfeldt's nephew.

== Political career ==
Already in the mid-1950s, Jonathan Motzfeldt started his battle for Greenland's autonomy with a group of young Inuit activists. In the early 1970s Motzfeldt became involved in the social democratic independence movement Siumut. After having placed himself at the forefront of the political emancipation process that Greenland's population began in earnest in the early 1970s, Motzfeldt became synonymous with the Greenland Home Rule. He secured almost absolute power through a series of political purges, where old comrades like Lars Emil Johansen, Moses Olsen, Lars Chemnitz, and Emil Abelsen were sidelined.

In 1977 he was elected Chairman of the Siumut party for the first time. In addition, he served as Speaker of the Greenland Landsting from 1979 to 1988, in 1997, and from 2002 to 2008.

On 1 May 1979, Jonathan Motzfeldt became the first Prime Minister of Greenland. He led the government for almost twelve years until 18 March 1991, when he was forced to resign and leave politics because of a drinking problem. However, he was awarded several key positions in the publicly owned portion of Greenland's economy. The post of Prime Minister thereafter went to Lars Emil Johansen. Due in part, but not exclusively, to the latter's alcoholism, Motzfeldt took the post of Prime Minister again in 1997. He held this post until 2002 when he was forced to call new elections because of serious criticism from the parliament (the Landsting) of management of the Home Rule's economy. Unilingual party fellow Hans Enoksen was elected Prime Minister of Greenland on December 14, 2002. Josef "Tuusi" Motzfeldt, the leader of IA, became deputy prime minister in the new government.

Jonathan Motzfeldt was then again elected chairman of the Greenlandic parliament. His last political year were marked by renewed alcohol abuse and uncontrolled expenses on travel and representation.

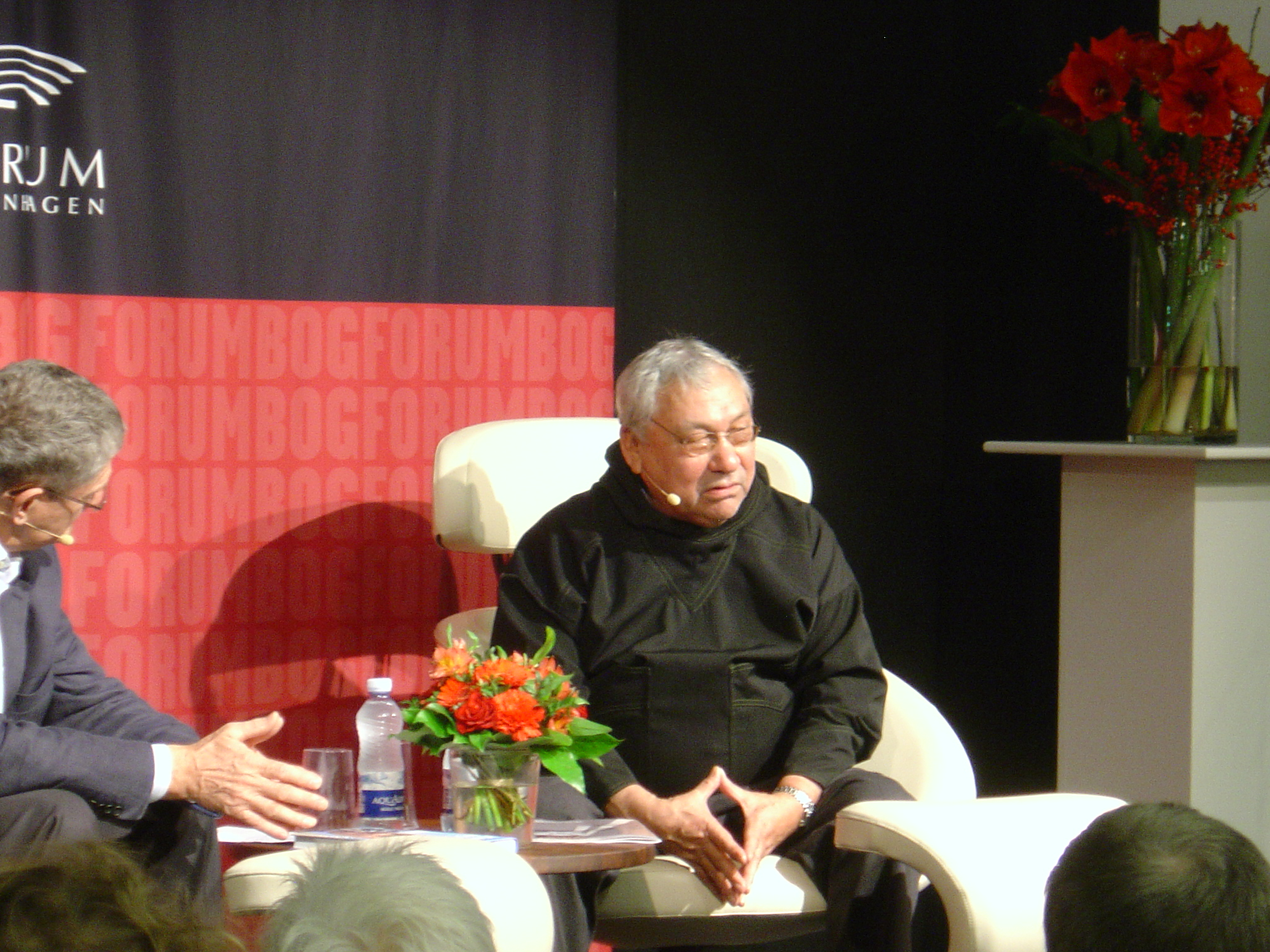
Jonathan Motzfeldt at a book fair in Copenhagen in November 2008.

Mr. Motzfeldt resigned as speaker of Greenland's Parliament on 18 January 2008 amid allegations that he had groped a female civil servant who reported him to the police. Motzfeldt denied wrongdoing. The case was subsequently dropped, without charges. Fellow party member Ruth Heilmann became his successor as speaker of the parliament.

In the spring of 2009, Motzfeldt was hit by a major scandal involving the abuse of public funds for private purposes. The newspaper AG documented that up to 2008 he had let the government pay for private dinners. Also, it was the public purse that paid when the former Prime Minister consumed large amounts of alcohol. The scandal culminated when he briefly before parliamentary elections in June 2009 was denied boarding a helicopter in Qaqortoq due to intoxication. He was not re-elected in the parliamentary elections on 2 June 2009.

== Death ==
Motzfeldt died on 28 October 2010, aged 72, from a cerebral hemorrhage. At the time of his death Motzfeldt was the president of the West Nordic Council.

Political offices
| New title Greenland granted home rule | Prime Minister of Greenland; 1979–1991 | Succeeded by Lars Emil Johansen |
| Preceded by Lars Emil Johansen | Prime Minister of Greenland; 1997–2002 | Succeeded by Hans Enoksen |
