= Josef Motzfeldt =

Greenlandic politician (born 1941)

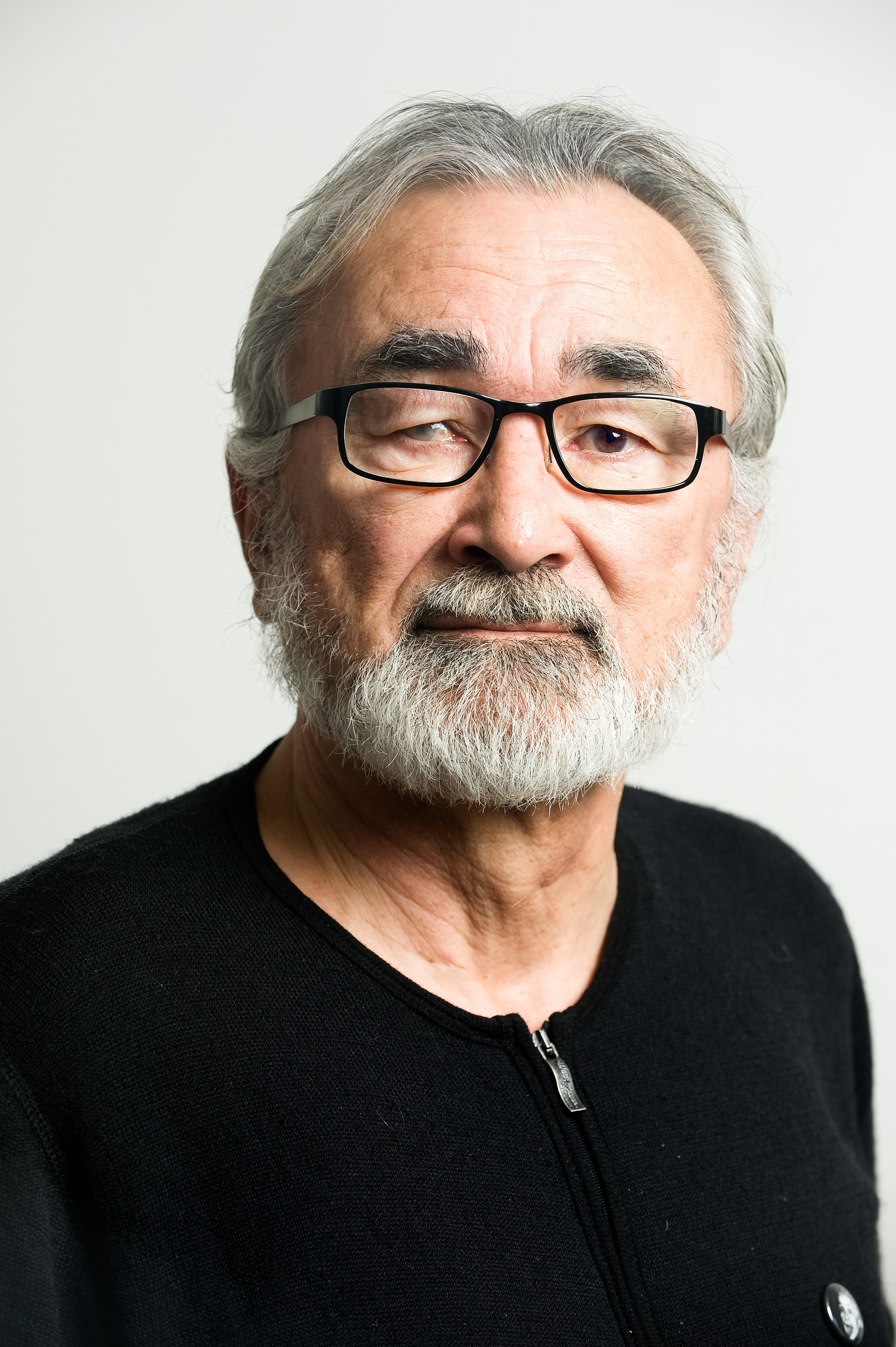
- Motzfeldt in 2009

Minister for Finance and Foreign Affairs
- In office 2009–2013

President West Nordic Council

Member of Parliament of Greenland

Leader Inuit Community Party

Personal details
- Born: Josef Tuusi Motzfeldt; 24 November 1941 (age 84) Igaliko, South Greenland
- Citizenship: Kingdom of Denmark
- Spouse: Vivi Motzfeldt
- Children: Nukâka Coster-Waldau
- Relatives: Nikolaj Coster-Waldau (son-in-law); Vivian Motzfeldt (niece)
- Occupation: Politician

Josef Tuusi Motzfeldt (born 24 November 1941) is a Greenlandic politician of Inuit and German descent. He served as Minister for Finance and Foreign Affairs in the Greenland government of 2009–2013. During his political career, Motzfeldt had been president of the West Nordic Council, a member of the Parliament of Greenland, leader of the Inuit Ataqatigiit party, and the Chairman of Parliament.

== Personal life ==
Motzfeldt is married to Vivi Motzfeldt (née Egede); their daughter Nukâka Coster-Waldau is a Greenlandic singer and actress.

Their niece, Vivian Motzfeldt (b. 1972), has been Greenland’s Minister of Foreign Affairs since 2022.

== See also ==
- Parliament of Greenland
- Politics of Greenland
