= Inuit Ataqatigiit =

Political party in Greenland

Community of the People Inuit Ataqatigiit
- Abbreviation: IA
- Chairperson: Múte Bourup Egede
- Founded: 8 November 1976 (as a political organisation); 21 November 1978 (as a political party)
- Headquarters: Nuuk, Greenland
- Youth wing: Inuit Ataqatigiit Inuusuttaat
- Ideology: Greenlandic independence; Democratic socialism; Environmentalism; Left-wing nationalism
- Political position: Left-wing to far-left
- National affiliation: Green Left
- Nordic affiliation: Nordic Green Left Alliance
- Colours: Red and white
- Inatsisartut: 7 / 31
- Municipalities: 16 / 81
- Mayors: 1 / 5
- Folketing (Greenland seats): 1 / 2

Website
- ia.gl

Inuit Ataqatigiit ([inuit atɑqat͡siɣiːt], old spelling: Inuit Ataĸatigît, lit. 'Community of the People', Danish: Folkets Samfund, IA) is a democratic socialist, pro-independence political party in Greenland. It is represented in the Folketing (the Danish parliament) by Aaja Chemnitz. Múte Bourup Egede has been the party's leader since December 2018.

== History ==
The party was founded as a political organisation in 1976, born out of the increased youth radicalism in Denmark during the 1970s.

In 1982, the party successfully campaigned in a national referendum for Greenland to leave the European Economic Community (EEC).

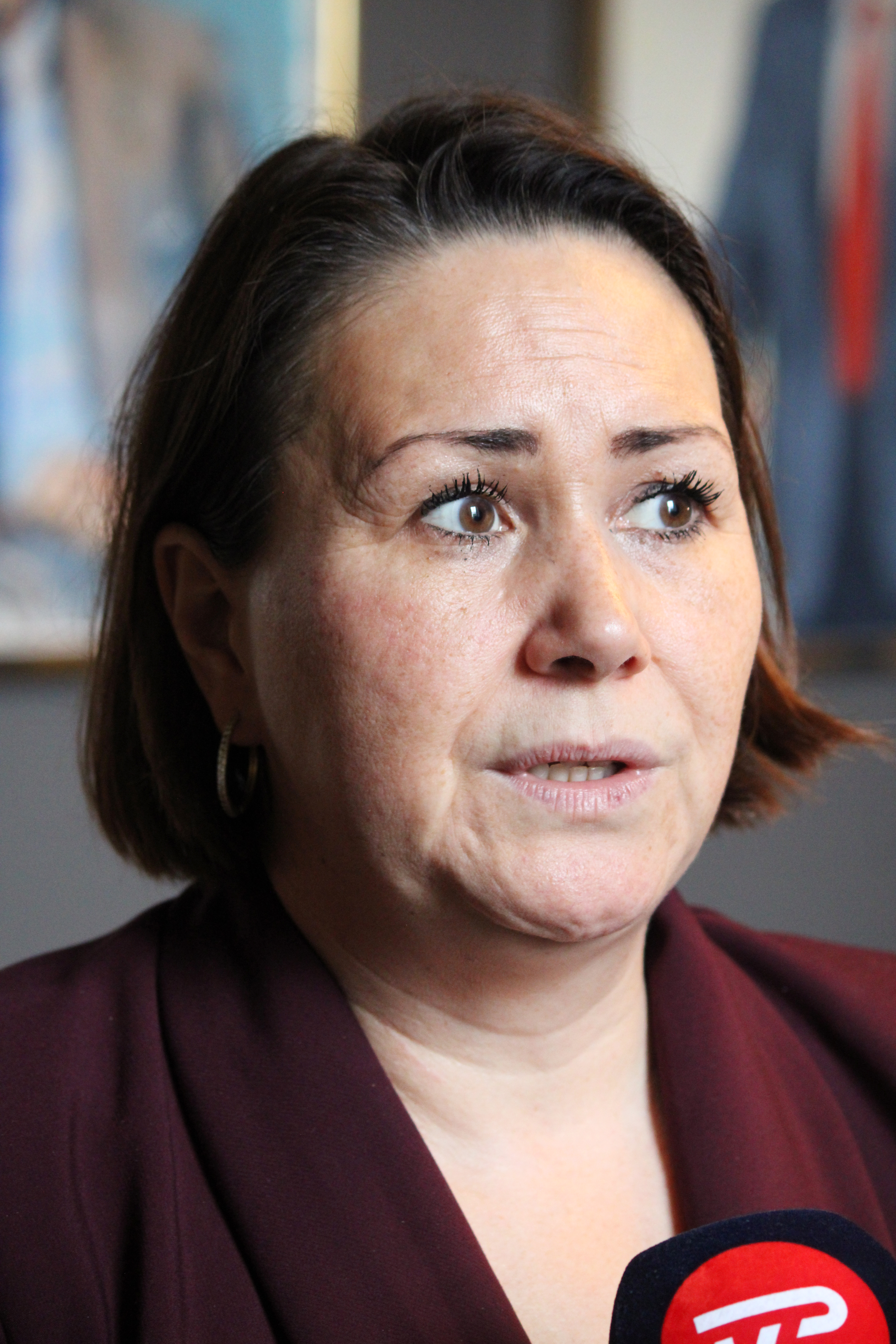
Aaja Chemnitz, the party's member of the Folketing from 2015-

Inuit Ataqatigiit made a major electoral breakthrough in the 2009 Greenlandic parliamentary election. Making gains from the 2005 Greenlandic parliamentary election, it doubled its total number of seats in the Parliament from seven to 14 seats out of 31, just two seats short of a majority, and nearly doubled its total vote share from 22.4% to 43.7%. It supplanted both its coalition partners, shifting the Forward party from first to second and the Democrats party from second to third. At the 2014 elections, the party obtained 11 members in the Greenlandic parliament, but after elections in 2018, their share decreased to eight seats. Following the 2021 elections, Inuit Ataqatigiit once again became the largest party in the Greenlandic parliament, with 12 seats; it fell to third place with seven seats in 2025.

== Ideology ==
The party has traditionally been in favour of a socialist economy, but parties to its left have criticised it for having gradually moved towards a capitalist approach, supporting a market economy and privatisation. Inuit Ataqatigiit believes that an independent Greenland should be competitive while fighting to keep the environment clean.

== Election results ==
=== Inatsisartut ===
Election	Votes	%	Seats	+/–	Position	Status
1979	813	4.4	0 / 21	New	▲4th	Opposition
1983	2,612	10.6	2 / 26	▲2	▲3rd	External support
1984	2,732	12.1	3 / 25	▲1	3rd	Coalition
1987	3,823	15.3	4 / 27	▲1	3rd	Coalition (1987–1988)
1987	3,823	15.3	4 / 27	▲1	3rd	Opposition (1988–1991)
1991	4,848	19.4	5 / 27	▲2	3rd	Coalition
1995	5,180	20.3	6 / 31	▲1	3rd	Opposition
1999	6,214	22.1	7 / 31	▲1	3rd	Coalition (1999–2001)
1999	6,214	22.1	7 / 31	▲1	3rd	Opposition (2001–2002)
2002	7,244	25.3	8 / 31	▲1	▲2nd	Coalition (2002–2003)
2002	7,244	25.3	8 / 31	▲1	▲2nd	Opposition (2003)
2002	7,244	25.3	8 / 31	▲1	▲2nd	Coalition (2003–2005)
2005	6,517	22.6	7 / 31	▼1	▼2nd	Coalition (2005–2007)
2005	6,517	22.6	7 / 31	▼1	▼2nd	Opposition (2007–2009)
2009	12,457	43.7	14 / 31	▲7	▲1st	Coalition
2013	10,374	34.4	11 / 31	▼3	▼2nd	Opposition
2014	9,783	33.2	11 / 31	Steady	2nd	Opposition (2014–2016)
2014	9,783	33.2	11 / 31	Steady	2nd	Coalition (2016–2018)
2018	7,478	25.5	8 / 31	▼3	2nd	Opposition
2021	9,933	37.4	12 / 31	▲4	▲1st	Coalition
2025	6,119	21.6	7 / 31	▼5	▼3rd	Coalition

=== Folketing ===
Election	Greenland				
Election	Votes	%	Seats	+/–	Position
1984	2,939	13.7	0 / 2	New	▲3rd
1987	2,001	12.5	0 / 2	Steady	3rd
1988	3,628	17.3	0 / 2	Steady	3rd
1990	3,281	17.0	0 / 2	Steady	3rd
1994	did not run				
1998	4,988	21.4	0 / 2	Steady	3rd
2001	7,172	30.8	1 / 2	▲1	▲1st
2005	5,774	25.5	1 / 2	Steady	▼2nd
2007	8,068	32.5	1 / 2	Steady	▲1st
2011	9,780	42.7	1 / 2	Steady	1st
2015	7,904	38.5	1 / 2	Steady	1st
2019	6,881	33.4	1 / 2	Steady	1st
2022	4,852	25.2	1 / 2	Steady	▼2nd
2026	6,133	29.24	1 / 2	Steady	▲1st
