= Inatsisartut =

Unicameral parliament of Greenland

Coordinates: 64°10′42″N 51°44′26″W

Parliament of Greenland: Inatsisartut (Greenlandic); Landstinget (Danish)
- 15th Inatsisartut

Type
- Type: Unicameral

History
- Founded: 1 May 1979
- Preceded by: Greenland Provincial Council
- New session started: 7 April 2025

Leadership
- Speaker: Kim Kielsen, no party affiliation since 7 April 2025
- First Vice Speaker: Mimi Karlsen, Inuit Ataqatigiit since 7 April 2025
- Second Vice Speaker: Aki-Matilda Høegh-Dam, Naleraq since 19 september 2025
- Prime Minister: Jens-Frederik Nielsen, Democrats since 28 March 2025

Structure
- Seats: 31
- Political groups: Government (19): Democrats (11); Inuit Ataqatigiit (7); Independent (1); Opposition (12): Naleraq (8); Siumut (2); Atassut (2)
- Length of term: Up to 4 years

Elections
- Voting system: Open list proportional representation allocated under the D'Hondt method
- First election: 4 April 1979
- Last election: 11 March 2025
- Next election: 2029

Meeting place
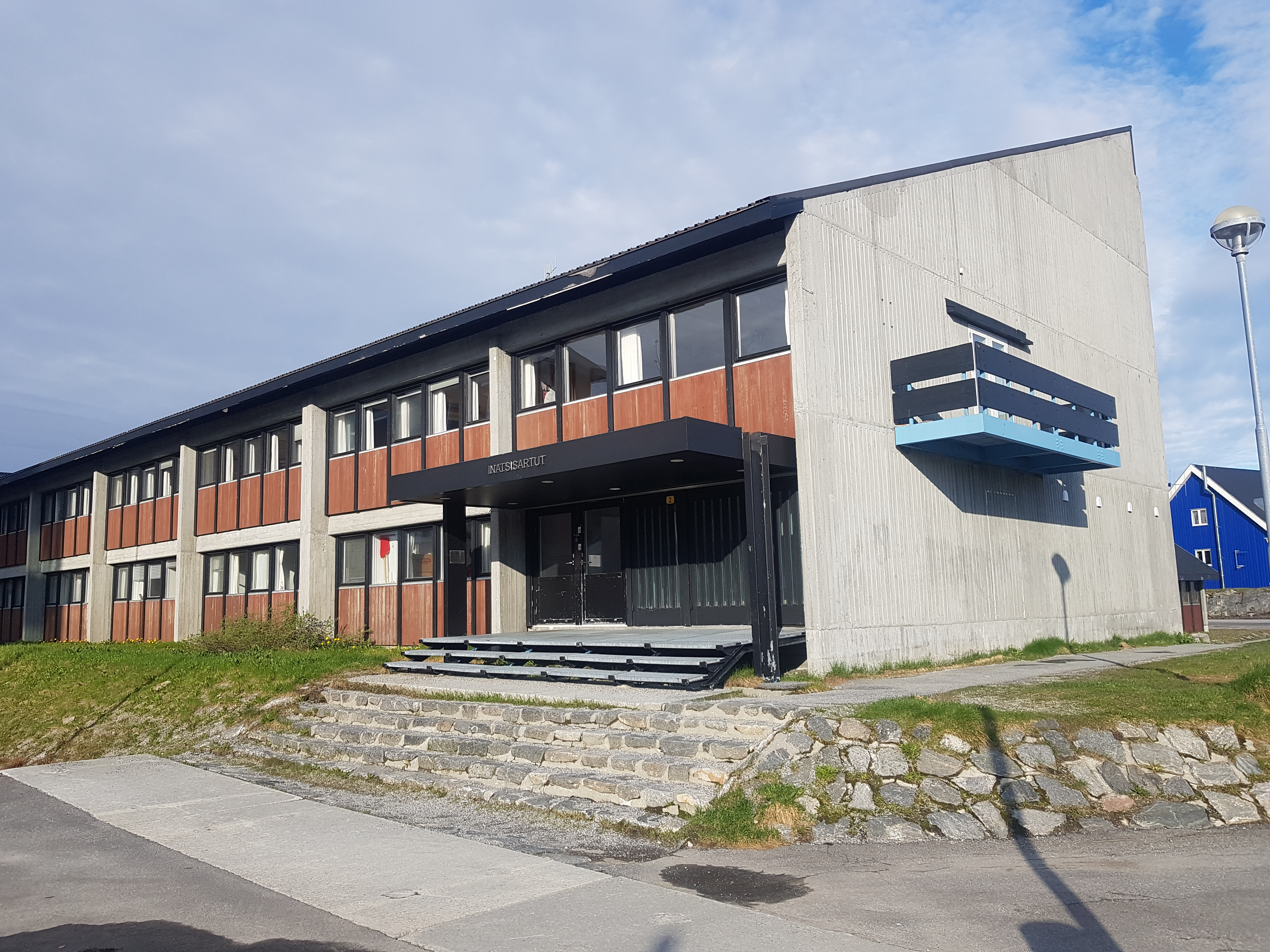
- Inatsisartut, Nuuk, Sermersooq

Website
- inatsisartut.gl

The Inatsisartut (Greenlandic pronunciation: [inatt͡sisɑtːʉt], lit. 'those who make the law' or 'the legislators'; Danish: Landstinget, lit. 'the land's thing'), also known as the Parliament of Greenland in English, is the unicameral parliament (legislative branch) of Greenland, an autonomous territory in the Danish Realm. Established in 1979, the parliament convenes in the Inatsisartut building, located on an islet in Nuuk Centrum in central Nuuk.

The Inatsisartut is composed of 31 members, who are elected for four-year terms through proportional representation. Its functions include electing its presidium, debating and passing legislation, scrutinizing the government, and discussing financial matters. The Prime Minister is elected by the Inatsisartut, and appoints the members of the Naalakkersuisut (Government) with parliamentary approval. The parliament has the authority to remove the cabinet or an individual minister through a vote of no confidence. The Prime Minister holds the prerogative to call for an early election, dissolving the parliament.

== History of the parliament ==
The Parliament of Greenland succeeded the provincial council (Danish: Grønlands Landsråd) on 1 May 1979. The parliament is led by a presidency comprising four members of the parliament, and the chairman.

== Speaker ==
The Presidium of the Inatsisartut is made up of a Speaker and four Vice Speakers, all elected from among the members of the parliament. The Speaker is the presiding officer, holds a full-time position and carries out the duties of the Presidium. Following a general election, the Prime Minister nominates the Speaker, who must then be confirmed by the members of the parliament.

The Presidium is responsible for a range of duties regarding the routine administration of the Inatsisartut, including overseeing the working conditions of parliamentarians and managing interactions between the parliament and the government. The Presidium also acts as the public representative of the parliament, ensuring efficient communication of parliamentary activities and outcomes to the public. It is also tasked with the archiving of parliamentary records and documents.

Speaker	Siumut	Kim Kielsen
Vice Speakers	Inuit Ataqatigiit	Mimi Karlsen
Vice Speakers	Naleraq	Mette Arqe-Hammeken
Vice Speakers	Demokraatit	Per Berthelsen
Vice Speakers	Atassut	Aqqalu C. Jerimiassen
Substitute Members	Siumut	Lars Poulsen
Substitute Members	Inuit Ataqatigiit	Pipaluk Lynge
Substitute Members	Naleraq	Qupanuk Olsen
Substitute Members	Demokraatit	Simigaq Heilmann
Substitute Members	Atassut	Knud Kleemann

The speaker is the presiding officer of the Inatsisartut. The speaker determines which members may speak, and is responsible for maintaining order. On 3 October 2018, Siumut had Vivian Motzfeldt, the outgoing Foreign Minister, elected. On 16 April 2021, Hans Enoksen was elected again. The current Speaker of the Inatsisartut is Kim Kielsen, who served as Prime Minister from 2016 to 2021.

== Membership ==
Members of the Inatsisartut are elected through a general, direct, free, equal, and secret vote. In order to be eligible, candidates must be eligible to vote themselves and must not have committed criminal offenses that would generally disqualify them from holding office, known as the "integrity requirement." The extent to which a candidate meets this requirement is determined by the Inatsisartut, based on the recommendations of the Committee for the Scrutiny of Eligibility, after the election has been held.

To run in an election for the Inatsisartut, candidates must also be registered on the electoral roll, which has the following requirements:

- The voter must be a Danish citizen, at least 18 years old on the election date, and have permanent residence in Greenland for at least six months immediately prior to the election.
- The voter must not have been declared incapable of managing their own affairs.

Election results are counted using the D'Hondt system, a method of proportional representation. Since 1998, Greenland has ceased to be divided into electoral districts, with the entire country now serving as a single constituency.

== Recent results ==
The most recent elections were held on 11 March 2025.

Party	Votes	%	+/–	Seats	+/–
Democrats	8,563	30.26	+21.01	10	+7
Naleraq	7,009	24.77	+12.51	8	+4
Inuit Ataqatigiit	6,119	21.62	–15.82	7	–5
Siumut	4,210	14.88	–15.22	4	–6
Atassut	2,092	7.39	+0.31	2	0
Qulleq	305	1.08	New	0	New
Total	28,298	100.00	–	31	0
Valid votes	28,298	98.87			
Invalid/blank votes	322	1.13			
Total votes	28,620	100.00			
Registered voters/turnout	40,369	70.90	+4.98		
Source: Qinersineq.gl

=== By municipality ===
Municipality	Party by percentage:					
Municipality	A	D	IA	N	Q	S
Avannaata	8.6	29	11.5	33.7	0.5	16.3
Kujalleq	7.8	27.9	27	15.2	1.6	18.8
Qeqertalik	7.9	25.4	19.4	31.5	1.2	13.6
Sermersooq	6.1	33.5	26.9	18.5	0.6	13
Qeqqata	8.2	26.4	16.8	30.1	2.3	15.2

== Composition since 1979 ==
Source

== See also ==
- Politics of Greenland:
  - Elections in Greenland
  - Prime Minister of Greenland
- Politics of the Faroe Islands (the other constituent country of the Kingdom of Denmark:
  - Elections in the Faroe Islands
  - Løgting, the parliament of the Faroe Islands
  - Prime Minister of the Faroe Islands
- Politics in the Kingdom of Denmark:
  - Elections in Denmark
  - Folketinget, the parliament of the Kingdom of Denmark
  - Prime Minister of Denmark (list)
  - The unity of the Realm, consisting of Denmark proper, the Faroe Islands, and Greenland
- Other parliaments in the Nordic countries:
  - Eduskunta (Finland)
    - Lagting (Åland)
  - Alþing (Iceland)
  - Storting (Norway)
  - Riksdag (Sweden)
