= List of members of the Inatsisartut, 2025–2029 =

Below is a list of the newly elected MPs as the results of the 2025 Greenlandic general election

== List ==
Name	Political Affiliation	Votes	In Government?
Aki-Matilda Høegh-Dam	Naleraq	2,954	No (since 28 March 2025)
Anna Wangenheim	Democrats	1,079	Yes (since 28 March 2025)
Aqqalu C. Jerimiassen	Atassut	1,083	Yes (since 28 March 2025)
Aqqaluaq Biilmann Egede	Inuit Ataqatigiit	357	Yes (since 28 March 2025)
Bentiaraq Ottosen	Atassut	281	Yes (since 28 March 2025)
Erik Jensen	Siumut	645	No (since 13 March 2026)
Gerth Mikaelsen	Naleraq	95	No (since 28 March 2025)
Hans Enoksen	Naleraq	312	No (since 28 March 2025)
Jens Napãtôᴋ'	Naleraq	476	No (since 28 March 2025)
Jens-Frederik Nielsen	Democrats	4,850	Yes (since 28 March 2025)
Jørgen Rosbach	Democrats	354	Yes (since 28 March 2025)
Justus Hansen	Democrats	134	Yes (since 28 March 2025)
Kim Kielsen	Siumut	612	No (since 13 March 2026)
Kuno Fencker	Naleraq	212	No (since 28 March 2025)
Lars Poulsen	Siumut	259	No (since 13 March 2026)
Margrethe Thaarup Andersen	Democrats	120	Yes (since 28 March 2025)
Mariane Paviasen Jensen	Inuit Ataqatigiit	268	Yes (since 28 March 2025)
Mette Arqe-Hammeken	Naleraq	120	No (since 28 March 2025)
Mimi Karlsen	Inuit Ataqatigiit	80	Yes (since 28 March 2025)
Minik Serano Frederiksen	Democrats	77	Yes (since 28 March 2025)
Múte Bourup Egede	Inuit Ataqatigiit	3,276	Yes (since 28 March 2025)
Naaja H. Nathanielsen	Inuit Ataqatigiit	428	Yes (since 28 March 2025)
Nivi Olsen	Democrats	453	Yes (since 28 March 2025)
Nivi Rosing	Inuit Ataqatigiit	144	Yes (since 28 March 2025)
Pele Broberg	Naleraq	1,254	No (since 28 March 2025)
Per Berthelsen	Democrats	81	Yes (since 28 March 2025)
Pipaluk Olsen	Democrats	246	Yes (since 28 March 2025)
Pipaluk Lynge	Inuit Ataqatigiit	83	Yes (since 28 March 2025)
Qupanuk Olsen	Naleraq	202	No (since 28 March 2025)
Simigaq Heilmann	Democrats	70	Yes (since 28 March 2025)
Vivian Motzfeldt	Siumut	247	No (since 13 March 2026)
