= List of members of the Inatsisartut, 2018–2021 =

Below is a list of the newly elected MPs as the results of the 2018 Greenlandic general election

== List ==
| Name | Political Affiliation | Votes | Party |
|---|---|---|---|
| Kim Kielsen | Siumut | 2,163 | Yes |
| Laura Tàunâjik | Siumut | 176 | Yes |
| Aleqa Hammond^{d} | Nunatta Qitornai | 171 | Yes |
| Anders Olsen | Siumut | 241 | Yes |
| Aqqaluaq B. Egede | Inuit Ataqatigiit | 873 | No |
| Bentiaraq Ottosen^{c} | Atassut | 276 | Yes |
| Emanuel Nûko^{b} | Partii Naleraq | 71 | Yes |
| Hans Enoksen | Partii Naleraq | 2,531 | Yes |
| Henrik Fleischer | Siumut | 143 | Yes |
| Hermann Berthelsen | Siumut | 429 | Yes |
| Jens Danielsen^{a} | Siumut | 154 | Yes |
| Jens Napaattooq | Partii Naleraq | 128 | Yes |
| Jess Svane^{a} | Siumut | 161 | Yes |
| Justus Hansen | Democrats | 194 | No |
| Karl-Kristian Kruse | Siumut | 322 | Yes |
| Múte Bourup Egede | Inuit Ataqatigiit | 233 | No |
| Mala Høy Kuko^{a} | Siumut | 138 | Yes |
| Malene Vahl Rasmussen | Democrats | 80 | No |
| Mikivsuk Thomassen | Inuit Ataqatigiit | 116 | No |
| Mimi Karlsen | Inuit Ataqatigiit | 140 | No |
| Niels Thomsen | Democrats | 2,773 | No |
| Nikkulaat Jeremiassen^{a} | Siumut | 140 | Yes |
| Nivi Olsen | Democrats | 874 | No |
| Peter Olsen | Inuit Ataqatigiit | 209 | No |
| Randi Vestergaard Evaldsen | Democrats | 579 | No |
| Sara Olsvig | Inuit Ataqatigiit | 3,360 | No |
| Siverth K. Heilmann | Atassut | 436 | Yes |
| Sofia Geisler | Inuit Ataqatigiit | 98 | No |
| Steen Lynge | Democrats | 75 | No |
| Stine Egede | Inuit Ataqatigiit | 99 | No |
| Tillie Martinussen | Cooperation Party | 480 | No |

a. Jens Danielsen, Jess Svane, Mala Høy Kuko, Nikkulaat Jeremiassen of Siumut all serve as substitute MPs in the Greenlandic Parliament for Doris J. Jensen, Erik Jensen, Simon Simonsen, and Vivian Motzfeldt in the executive cabinet.
b. Emanuel Nûko of Partii Naleraq serves as the substitute MP in the Greenlandic Parliament for Pele Broberg in the executive cabinet.
c. Bentiaraq Ottosen of Atassut serves as the substitute MP in the Greenlandic Parliament for Aqqalu C. Jerimiassen in the executive cabinet.
d. Aleqa Hammond of Nunatta Qitornai serves as the substitute MP in the Greenlandic Parliament for Vittus Qujaukitsoq in the executive cabinet.
