= Bertelsen =

Bertelsen and Berthelsen are Danish-Norwegian patronymic surnames meaning "son of Bertel" or cognate "Berthel" (both equivalent of the Biblical Βαρθολομαίος/Bartholomaios, cf. English Bartholomew). There are several people with this surname:

== Bertelsen ==
- Aage and Gerda Bertelsen, Danish resistance members
- Aage Bertelsen (1873–1945), Danish painter
- Albert Bertelsen (1921–2019), Danish autodidact painter and graphic artist
- Barbara Bertelsen, Danish jurist
- Brian Bertelsen (born 1963), Danish footballer
- Carl Bertelsen (1937–2019), Danish footballer
- Erik Bertelsen (1912–1993), Danish ichthyologist
- Frederik Bertelsen (born 1974), Danish cyclist
- Jens Jørn Bertelsen (born 1952), Danish footballer
- Jes Bertelsen (born 1946), Danish philosopher
- Jim Bertelsen (1950–2021), American football player
- Karen Bertelsen, Canadian broadcaster
- Lise Bertelsen (born 1975), Danish politician
- Mads Bertelsen (born 1994), Danish footballer
- Mikael Bertelsen (born 1967), Danish radio and TV personality
- Niels Bertelsen (1926–1989), Danish boxer
- Nils Bertelsen (1879–1958), Norwegian sailor
- Ola Bertelsen (1864–1946), Norwegian jurist and politician
- Ole Peder Bertelsen (1930–2018), Danish-born oil trader and entrepreneur
- Rasmus Bertelsen (born 1983), Danish association football manager
- Trond Erik Bertelsen (born 1984), Norwegian footballeer
- Verner Bertelsen (1918–2015), American politician
- William R. Bertelsen (1920–2009), American inventor

== Berthelsen ==
- Anders W. Berthelsen (born 1969), Danish actor
- Anne Valentina Berthelsen (born 1994), Danish politician
- Asii Berthelsen (born 2004), Danish footballer
- Berit Berthelsen (1944–2022), Norwegian sprinter and long jumper
- Bernhard Berthelsen (1897–1964), Norwegian politician
- Hermann Berthelsen, Greenlandic politician
- Jacob Berthelsen (born 1986), Danish footballer
- Jens Berthelsen (1890–1961), Danish fencer
- Jens Peter Berthelsen (1854–1934), Danish fencer
- Johann Berthelsen (1883–1972), American painter
- Julie Berthelsen (born 1979), Danish-Greenlandic musician
- Kiehn Berthelsen (born 1925), Danish speedway rider
- Kurt Berthelsen (born 1943), Danish footballer
- Linnea Berthelsen, Danish actress
- Malik Berthelsen, Greenlandic politician
- Olga P. Berthelsen, Greenlandic politician
- Per Berthelsen (born 1950), Greenlandic politician
- Rasmus Berthelsen (1827–1901), Greenlandic poet and artist
- Richard Berthelsen (born 1944), American lawyer and labor leader
- Roar Berthelsen (1934–1990), Norwegian long jumper
- Villum Berthelsen (born 2006), Danish footballer
