= Kuno Fencker =

- Born: 26 November 1974 (age 51); Ilulissat
- Occupations: businessperson and politician
- Known for: Inatsisartut member

Kuno Fencker (born 26 November 1974 in Ilulissat) is a Greenlandic politician. He has served as a substitute member of the Parliament of Greenland, Inatsisartut, since April 2022. He was originally a member of Naleraq. In 2020, he switched parties to Siumut, but returned to Naleraq in 2025.

== Trajectory ==
Kuno Fencker trained as a transport economist (Graduate Diploma in Business Administration) at Aalborg University and later studied law (LL.M.). He was working for the oil company Cairn Energy when he was elected chairman of the Board of Royal Arctic Line in 2014. In 2015, he co-founded Aluu Airlines with Pele Broberg and became the Chief Commercial Officer (CCO) for the airline, which never became active. He was replaced as Chairman of Royal Arctic Line in 2018.

During the 2019 general election, he joined Partii Naleraq and ran for the Folketing alongside his business partner Pele Broberg, but both were defeated by Aaja Chemnitz and Aki-Matilda Høegh-Dam. Fencker is the partner of the latter. In February 2020, she and other women accused politician Mikael Petersen of sexual harassment, after which Siumut dismissed him as party secretary. When Partii Naleraq hired Petersen as party secretary shortly thereafter, Kuno Fencker left the party in early April 2020 and joined Siumut. He ran as a candidate for Siumut in the 2021 election to the Inatsisartut and became the party's 7th substitute with 66 votes. He became a substitute member of Inatsisartut when four Siumut members took leave after joining the Múte Bourup Egede II Cabinet in April 2022.

In January 2025, he caused a stir when he traveled to the United States without his party's approval and met with figures including Republican Andy Ogles to discuss Greenland's future. After being criticized by Aaja Chemnitz and others, he reported her to the police for defamation. On 3 February, the local Siumut branch in Nuuk publicly demanded his expulsion from the party, though this was not carried out despite criticism from party leadership. Nevertheless, two days later, he announced that he was considering leaving the party. His fiancée, Aki-Matilda Høegh-Dam, left Siumut two days later and subsequently joined Naleraq. Kuno Fencker also returned to his old party on 11 February.

Regarding the Proposed United States acquisition of Greenland, while reiterating that the island's goal was independence, on early 2025 Fencker said that a COFA with the United States and Denmark was possible, stating that "Greenland's economy needs to be diversified ... So Donald Trump Junior, and even his father and other (members of the incoming) administration from the US are extremely welcome here in Greenland as visitors ... and also maybe more officially in the future". Fencker and Jørgen Boassen met with Thomas Dans when the latter arrived in Nuuk on 11 January. On 30 January 2025, U.S. Secretary of State Marco Rubio confirmed that when Trump said he wanted to buy Greenland, it was "not a joke." Trump believed that Denmark would eventually give in.

In September 2026, using recordings by its mole, 21-year old theology student Christian Ursilva, linked Fencker alongside Boassen and Dans to efforts to secure backdoor U.S. investments in Greenland. Fencker commented that he had no formal involvement in the project.
