= 2017 Greenlandic local elections =

Council elections in Greenland

- 4 April 2017
- 5 municipal councils
Party	Leader	Vote %	Seats	+/–
Siumut	Kim Kielsen	41.5	39	+1
Inuit Ataqatigiit	Sara Olsvig	32.4	26	+6
Atassut	Siverth K. Heilmann	11.8	9	0
Democrats	Randi V. Evaldsen	8.2	4	+2
Naleraq	Has Enoksen	4.6	3	New
This lists parties that won seats. See the complete results below.

The Greenlandic local elections of 2017 were held on 4 April 2017 for Greenland's 3 regional municipality councils, 2 transition committees, several settlement councils and parochial church councils. All seats will be contested for the 2018–21 term of office. In the previous election there were 70 seats.

== Results ==
=== Results of municipal elections ===
==== Number of councillors and political parties in the regional Municipal Councils ====
Sum of local elections
Party	Share of vote		Seats	
Party	Percent	Change	Number	Change
Forward	41.5 %	▼6.0%	39	▲1
Community of the People	32.4 %	▲3.0%	26	▲6
Solidarity	11.8 %	▼1.1%	9	Steady
Democrats	8.2 %	▲1.8%	4	▲2
Point of Orientation Party	4.6 %	New	3	New
Others	0%	▼0.2%	0	▼1

==== Mayors in the regional municipalities ====
The mayors (Greenlandic: Kommuneqarfiup Siulersortaa; plural: Kommuneqarfiup Siulersortai, Danish: Borgmester; plural: Borgmestre) of the 5 municipalities heads the council meetings and is the chairman of the finance committee in each of their respective municipalities.

Mayors after the election
Party	Number	Change
Forward	3	▼1
Community of the People	2	▲1
Solidarity	0	Steady
Democrats	0	Steady
Point of Orientation Party	0	New
Independents	0	Steady

=== Old and new mayors in the regional municipalities ===
The term of office for the mayors elected by the majority of councillors among its members in each municipal council is the same as for the councils elected, namely 2 April 2013 until 31 April 2017.

Mayors outgoing and incoming
Municipality	Incumbent mayor	Elected mayor	Municipality
Kujalleq Municipality	Jørgen Wæver Johansen	Kirsten P. Isaksen	Kujalleq Municipality
Qaasuitsup Municipality	Ole Dorph	Palle Jeremiassen	Avannaata Municipality
Qaasuitsup Municipality	Ole Dorph	Ane Hansen	Qeqertalik Municipality
Qeqqata Municipality	Hermann Berthelsen	Malik Berthelsen	Qeqqata Municipality
Sermersooq Municipality	Asii Chemnitz Narup	Asii Chemnitz Narup	Sermersooq Municipality
