= 2025 Greenlandic local elections =

- 1 April 2025
- 81 seats on 5 municipal councils
- Turnout: 52.6%
Party	Leader	Vote %	Seats	+/–
Siumut	Vivian Motzfeldt	34.0	31	0
Democrats	Jens Frederik Nielsen	25.3	21	+17
Inuit Ataqatigiit	Múte Bourup Egede	21.6	16	−16
Naleraq	Pele Broberg	11.2	9	+1
Atassut	Aqqalu C. Jerimiassen	6.4	4	−2
This lists parties that won seats. See the complete results below.

Local elections were held in Greenland on 1 April 2025 to elect the members of the 5 municipal councils. Turnout was significantly down from both the previous municipal elections in 2021 and from the general election less than a month prior. The election saw the Siumut party regain ground after finishing fourth in the general election.

== Results ==
=== Greenland-wide results ===
Party	Votes	%	+/–	Seats	+/–
Siumut	7,323	33.97	▼2.15	31	Steady
Democrats	5,452	25.29	▲18.41	21	▲17
Inuit Ataqatigiit	4,663	21.63	▼15.89	16	▼16
Naleraq	2,409	11.17	▲0.49	9	▲1
Atassut	1,388	6.44	▼0.97	4	▼2
Qulleq	215	1.00	New	0	New
Independent	109	0.51	▲0.34	0	Steady
Total	21,559	100.00	–	81	0
Valid votes	21,559	98.82			
Invalid/blank votes	257	1.18			
Total votes	21,816	100.00			
Registered voters/turnout	41,435	52.65	▼11.19		
Source: Qinersineq.gl

=== By municipality ===
Avannaata

Party	Votes	%	+/–	Seats	+/–
Siumut	1,755	36.39	▼10.29	7	▼2
Democrats	1,245	25.81	▲16.17	4	▲3
Naleraq	838	17.38	▲5.16	3	▲1
Atassut	546	11.32	▼0.84	2	0
Inuit Ataqatigiit	414	8.58	▼8.47	1	▼2
Qulleq	25	0.52	New	–	New
Total	4,823	100.00	–	17	0
Valid votes	4,823	99.40			
Invalid/blank votes	29	0.60			
Total votes	4,852	100.00			
Registered voters/turnout	8,013	60.55	▼9.00		
Source: Qinersineq.gl

Kujalleq

Party	Votes	%	+/–	Seats	+/–
Democrats	1,089	39.56	▲39.56	7	▲7
Siumut	831	30.19	▼11.20	5	▼1
Inuit Ataqatigiit	619	22.48	▼29.85	3	▼5
Atassut	129	4.69	▼1.59	0	▼1
Qulleq	65	2.36	New	0	New
Naleraq	20	0.73	▲0.73	0	0
Total	2,753	100.00	–	15	0
Valid votes	2,753	98.43			
Invalid/blank votes	44	1.57			
Total votes	2,797	100.00			
Registered voters/turnout	4,567	61.24	▼7.43		
Source: Qinersineq.gl

Qeqertalik

Party	Votes	%	+/–	Seats	+/–
Siumut	995	39.53	▲13.24	6	▲2
Democrats	672	26.70	▲17.80	4	▲3
Inuit Ataqatigiit	455	18.08	▼36.05	3	▼6
Atassut	213	8.46	▲0.30	1	Steady
Naleraq	182	7.23	▲5.77	1	▲1
Total	2,517	100.00	–	15	0
Valid votes	2,517	98.94			
Invalid/blank votes	27	1.06			
Total votes	2,544	100.00			
Registered voters/turnout	4,430	57.43	▼12.60		
Source: Qinersineq.gl

Qeqqata

Party	Votes	%	+/–	Seats	+/–
Siumut	1,231	33.53	▼6.81	6	Steady
Naleraq	871	23.73	▼1.51	4	Steady
Democrats	781	21.27	▲19.91	2	▲2
Inuit Ataqatigiit	408	11.11	▼9.99	2	▼1
Atassut	298	8.12	▼3.84	1	▼1
Qulleq	82	2.23	New	0	New
Total	3,671	100.00	–	15	0
Valid votes	3,671	98.95			
Invalid/blank votes	39	1.05			
Total votes	3,710	100.00			
Registered voters/turnout	6,633	55.93	▼10.11		
Source: Qinersineq.gl

Sermersooq

Party	Votes	%	+/–	Seats	+/–
Inuit Ataqatigiit	2,767	35.50	▼10.78	7	▼2
Siumut	2,511	32.21	▲2.09	7	▲1
Democrats	1,665	21.36	▲11.74	4	▲2
Naleraq	498	6.39	▼3.45	1	▼1
Atassut	202	2.59	▼0.28	0	Steady
Independent	109	1.40	▲1.40	0	Steady
Qulleq	43	0.55	New	0	New
Total	7,795	100.00	–	19	0
Valid votes	7,795	98.51			
Invalid/blank votes	118	1.49			
Total votes	7,913	100.00			
Registered voters/turnout	17,792	44.48	▼12.51		
Source: Qinersineq.gl

== See also ==
- 2025 Greenlandic general election
