= 2021 Greenlandic local elections =

Greenland's 2021 local elections

← 2017	6 April 2021	2025 →
- 81 seats on 5 municipal councils
Party	Leader	Vote %	Seats	+/–
Inuit Ataqatigiit	Múte Bourup Egede	37.6	32	+6
Siumut	Erik Jensen	36.2	31	−8
Naleraq	Hans Enoksen	10.7	8	+5
Atassut	Aqqalu Jerimiassen	7.4	6	−3
Democrats	Jens Frederik Nielsen	6.9	4	0
This lists parties that won seats. See the complete results below.

The 2021 Greenlandic local elections were held on 6 April 2021 for the 5 municipal councils. In the 2017 elections, Forward remained the largest party. The 2021 Greenlandic general election, along with District council and parish elections, were held on the same day. Like in the 2017 elections, there were 81 seats up for election.

== Results ==
=== Councillors in the regional Municipal Councils ===
Sum of local elections – turnout 63.8% (▲2.7%)
Party	Vote totals			Seats	
Party	Number	Percent	Change	Number	Change
Inuit Ataqatigiit	9,822	37.6%	▲5.2%	32	▲6
Siumut	9,454	36.2%	▼5.3%	31	▼8
Naleraq	2,794	10.7%	▲6.1%	8	▲5
Atassut	1,942	7.4%	▼4.4%	6	▼3
Democrats	1,800	6.9%	▼1.3%	4	Steady
Nunatta Qitornai	243	0.9%	New	0	New
Others	43	0.2%	New	0	New
Blank/Void	518				
Overall Totals	26,691	100.0%	Steady	81	Steady

==== Results by Individual Municipality ====
Results in the Avannaata municipality (Voter Count: 7,845) - Turnout: 69.5% (▲6.4%)
Party	Vote Totals		Seats (17)	
Party	Number	Percent	Number	Change
Siumut	2,519	46.7%	9	Steady
Inuit Ataqatigiit	920	17.1%	3	▲1
Naleraq	659	12.2%	2	Steady
Atassut	656	12.2%	2	▼1
Democrats	520	9.6%	1	Steady
Nunatta Qitornai	121	2.2%	0	New
Valid Votes (Blank/Void)	5,395 (61)			
Result: Independent Gain from Siumut The former mayor left Siumut after the election to form a government with the other four parties.

Results in the Kujalleq municipality (Voter Count: 4,832) - Turnout 70.1% (▲1.5%)
Party	Vote Totals		Seats (15)	
Party	Number	Percent	Number	Change
Inuit Ataqatigiit	1,726	52.3%	8	▲3
Siumut	1,365	41.4%	6	▼3
Atassut	207	6.3%	1	Steady
Valid Votes (Blank/Void)	3,298 (90)			
Result: Inuit Ataqatigiit Gain from Siumut (Majority of 1)

Results in the Qeqertalik municipality (Voter Count: 4,681) - Turnout 70.0% (▲1.7%)
Party	Vote Totals		Seats (15)	
Party	Number	Percent	Number	Change
Inuit Ataqatigiit	1,745	54.1%	9	▲2
Siumut	839	26.0%	4	▼3
Democrats	287	8.9%	1	▲1
Atassut	263	8.2%	1	Steady
Naleraq	47	1.5%	0	Steady
Others	43	1.3%	0	New
Valid Votes (Blank/Void)	3,224 (54)			
Result: Inuit Ataqatigiit Hold (Majority of 3)

Results in the Qeqqata municipality (Voter Count: 6,906) - Turnout 66.0% (▲4.9%)
Party	Vote Totals		Seats (15)	
Party	Number	Percent	Number	Change
Siumut	1,814	40.3%	6	▼2
Naleraq	1,135	25.2%	4	▲3
Inuit Ataqatigiit	949	21.1%	3	Steady
Atassut	538	12.0%	2	▼1
Democrats	61	1.4%	0	Steady
Valid Votes (Blank/Void)	4,497 (64)			
Result: Siumut loses its majority, but retains a plurality of seats

Results in the Sermersooq municipality (Voter Count: 17,428) - Turnout 57.0% (▲1.2%)
Party	Vote Totals		Seats (19)	
Party	Number	Percent	Number	Change
Inuit Ataqatigiit	4,482	46.3%	9	Steady
Siumut	2,917	30.1%	6	Steady
Naleraq	953	9.8%	2	▲2
Democrats	932	9.6%	2	▼1
Atassut	278	2.9%	0	▼1
Nunatta Qitornai	122	1.3%	0	New
Valid Votes (Blank/Void)	9,684 (249)			
Result: Inuit Ataqatigiit retains a plurality of seats

=== Mayors in the regional municipalities ===
Mayors of Greenland's 5 municipalities are the head of council meetings.

Mayors after the election
Party	Number	Change
Inuit Ataqatigiit	3	▲1
Siumut	1	▼2
Independents	1	▲1
Atassut	0	Steady
Democrats	0	Steady
Naleraq	0	Steady
Nunatta Qitornai	0	New
	5	Steady

==== Old and new mayors in the regional municipalities ====
Mayors outgoing and incoming
Municipality	Incumbent mayor	Elected mayor
Kujalleq Municipality	Kirsten P. Isaksen	Stine Egede
Avannaata Municipality	Palle Jeremiassen	Palle Jeremiassen
Qeqertalik Municipality	Ane Hansen	Ane Hansen
Qeqqata Municipality	Malik Berthelsen	Malik Berthelsen
Sermersooq Municipality	Charlotte Ludvigsen	Charlotte Ludvigsen
