= Qupanuk Olsen =

Greenlandic YouTuber (born 1985)

Member of the Inatsisartut
- In office March 2025 – September 2025

Personal details
- Born: Qupanuk Egede; 6 May 1985 (age 41) Qaqortoq, Greenland
- Party: Naleraq
- Occupation: Engineer; YouTuber
- Website: qs.gl
- Other name: Q

YouTube information
- Channel: Q's Greenland
- Years active: 2020–present
- Genres: Education; travel; documentary
- Subscribers: 495 thousand
- Views: 169 million
- Last updated: 23 April 2026

Qupanuk Olsen (Greenlandic pronunciation: [ˈqupanuk]; née Egede; born 6 May 1985) is a Greenlandic YouTuber, content creator, engineer, and politician known for her education and travel series Q's Greenland. Her content primarily focuses on Greenland's traditions, cuisine, locales, and history. A member of Naleraq, she was elected as a member of the Inatsisartut in the 2025 election.

In addition to her work as a content creator, Olsen studied at Curtin University's Western Australian School of Mines for a degree in civil engineering with a specialization in mining. She previously worked at the Nalunaq gold mine, Orbicon, and taught at the Arctic Technology Centre in Sisimiut. She currently works as Greenlandic director for Ironbark Zinc. A supporter of Greenlandic independence, Olsen believes that mining would be central to supporting the economic development of an independent Greenland.

== Early life ==
Olsen was born Qupanuk Egede on 6 May 1985 in Qaqortoq, Greenland to Karen and Kaj Egede. She stayed with her biological mother until she was three years old, her mother was diagnosed with cancer at that time and was left unable to care for her or her sister. Qupanuk was sent to live with her father and her stepmother, whom she called "muua". She attended the Tasersuup Atuarfia for her primary schooling, where she excelled in mathematics and chemistry. As a child, she spent summers on vacation overseas.

Olsen attended schooling in Denmark, the United States, and Australia. She initially was admitted to Aalborg University's school of architecture and design and reached the third semester before she found it poorly suited for her interests. She then applied to the Royal Danish Navy and spent a year and a half there, eventually becoming a constable. She attended structural engineering in Aarhus University, then spent six months in the Colorado School of Mines. In Australia she attended Kalgoorlie's Curtin University's Western Australian School of Mines for her master's degree where she studied for her degree in civil engineering with a specialization in mining. In 2014, she was the recipient of a scholarship by the Ivalo & Minik Foundation to continue her studies at the university. While studying at Kalgoorlie University, she was profiled in the mining magazine Ingeniøren, which outlined Egede's fascination with mining and her desire for Greenlandic independence.

While in university, she served as vice president of the Association of Greenlanders Studying in Denmark. She served on the board of directors for the Avalak organization.

== Career ==
Olsen initially worked as an intern at the now-closed Nalunaq gold mine. In 2014 she worked at Orbicon's Greenland branch. She later taught mining in the Arctic Technology Centre in Sisimiut. She currently works as the Greenlandic director for the Australian mining company Ironbark Zinc Limited.

=== Q's Greenland ===
Olsen's YouTube channel, Q's Greenland, covers topics such as local cuisine, landscapes, the Greenlandic Inuit language, and life as an Indigenous person in a country colonized by Denmark. Olsen additionally maintains a presence on Instagram and TikTok. She is known for her sign off "Life is amazing, Aqagu takuss' (See you tomorrow.)" She has been dubbed "Greenland's self-described 'biggest influencer'" by In These Times.

She additionally owns the consultancy company "Q's Effect", which gives courses on social media and collaborates with companies. Olsen was invited to promote a citizen science initiative wherein fishermen were entitled to cash prizes after the submission of catch reports, and an ice company which sources its ice from the fjords surrounding Nuuk. Olsen collaborated with the Foundation for Entrepreneurship to organize the "Arsarnerit Inuusuttai – Young Northern Lights" gathering held in Ilulissat, an entrepreneurial competition between Greenlandic youth. In 2024, Olsen was among the dignitaries invited to attend the opening of direct flights between Nuuk and Iqaluit.

Olsen came under controversy after attending a conference hosted in Tel Aviv amid the Gaza war hosted by Israeli Arab influencer Nas Daily, with some social media users accusing her of supporting Israel amid the conflict. In response, she stated her opposition to all wars, noted that accommodations were paid for by Yassin rather than the Israeli state, and donations were made to Gaza during the conference. As a result of the controversy, Olsen expressed that she was about to lose contracts with Greenlandic companies.

=== Politics ===
In January 2025, Olsen announced she would represent the populist party Naleraq in the upcoming 2025 Greenlandic general election. Her main campaign issue is Greenlandic state formation. However, she promised to keep her YouTube channel apolitical. She was elected, receiving 202 votes under the open list proportional representation system as her party received 24.77% of the nationwide vote.

== Personal life ==
Olsen is married and is the mother of four children. As of 2023, her family lives in Qinngorput, Nuuk. She speaks English, Danish, and Greenlandic. Olsen struggled with language learning in her youth, only learning English at age 23. She was raised Christian but now follows traditional Inuit practices.

Olsen supports Greenlandic independence. Olsen cited the mining industry as central to supporting the economy of an independent Greenland. She attempted to petition the Inatsisartut and Naalakkersuisut to permanently shift the Greenlandic time zone to UTC−03:00, citing the strain it put on children's health.
