= Greenland (Folketing constituency) =

Constituency of the Folketing, the national legislature of the Kingdom of Denmark

- Kalaallit Nunaat; Grønland
- Constituency for the Folketing
- Location of Greenland within Kingdom of Denmark
- Municipality: List: Avannaata; Kujalleq; Qeqertalik; Qeqqata; Sermersooq
- Population: 56,562 (2022)
- Electorate: 41,305 (2022)
- Area: 2,166,086 km^{2} (2022)

Current constituency
- Created: 1975
- Seats: 2 (1975–present)
- Members of the Folketing: List: Aaja Chemnitz (IA); Aki-Matilda Høegh-Dam (N)
- Parliament: Inatsisartut
- Created from: Greenland 1; Greenland 2

Greenland (Greenlandic: Kalaallit Nunaat; Danish: Grønland) is one of the 12 multi-member constituencies of the Folketing, the national legislature of the Kingdom of Denmark. The constituency was established in 1975 following the merger of the two constituencies that covered Greenland. The constituency currently elects two North Atlantic mandates. This is 2 of the 179 members of the Folketing using the open party-list proportional representation electoral system. At the 2022 general election it had 41,305 registered electors.

== Electoral system ==
Greenland currently elects two of the 179 members of the Folketing using the open party-list proportional representation electoral system. Seats are allocated using the D'Hondt method.

== Election results ==
=== Summary ===
Election	Inuit Ataqatigiit IA			Siumut S			Naleraq N / PN			Democrats D			Atassut A		
Election	Votes	%	Seats	Votes	%	Seats	Votes	%	Seats	Votes	%	Seats			
2026	6,133	28.6%	1	3,515	16.4%	0	5,268	24.6%	1	3,767	17.6%	0	2,290	10.7%	0
2022	4,844	25.16%	1	7,438	38.63%	1	2,416	12.55%	0	3,654	18.98%	0	728	3.78%	0
2019	6,867	34.35%	1	6,063	30.33%	1	1,564	7.82%	0	2,258	11.30%	0	1,098	5.49%	0
2015	7,914	39.17%	1	7,854	38.87%	1	1,058	5.24%	0	1,852	9.17%	0	1,528	7.56%	0
2011	9,587	42.61%	1	8,374	37.22%	1				2,831	12.58%	0	1,706	7.58%	0
2007	8,347	33.25%	1	8,075	32.16%	1				4,586	18.27%	0	4,097	16.32%	0
2005	5,785	25.03%	1	7,775	33.65%	1				4,924	21.31%	0	3,781	16.36%	0
2001	7,172	30.83%	1	6,033	25.94%	1							5,138	22.09%	0
1998	4,988	21.42%	0	8,502	36.51%	1							8,404	36.09%	1
1994													7,501	34.73%	1
1990	3,281	16.97%	0	8,272	42.77%	1							7,087	36.65%	1
1988	3,628	17.28%	0	8,415	40.07%	1							8,135	38.74%	1
1987	2,001	12.47%	0	6,944	43.28%	1							6,627	41.30%	1
1984	2,939	13.74%	0	9,148	42.76%	1							9,308	43.51%	1
1981				7,126	37.75%	1							9,223	48.86%	1
1979				6,273	44.07%	1							6,390	44.89%	1

=== Detailed ===
==== 2020s ====
===== 2026 =====
Results of the 2026 general election held on 24 March 2026:

Party		Votes per municipality					Total Votes	%	Seats
Party		Avan- naata	Kujal- leq	Qeqer- talik	Qeq- qata	Sermer- sooq	Total Votes	%	Seats
Inuit Ataqatigiit	IA	641	822	558	943	3,169	6,133	28.5%	1
Naleraq	N	1,511	430	693	955	1,679	5,268	24.7%	1
Democrats	D	415	455	198	366	2,333	3,767	17.6%	0
Siumut	S	891	521	402	529	1,172	3,515	16.3%	0
Atassut	A	486	263	287	413	841	2,290	10.6%	0
Valid votes							20,973	97.88%	2
Blank votes							297	1.39%	
Void votes							158	0.74%	
Total polled							21,428	52.3%	
Registered electors							40,952		
Turnout							52.3%		

The following candidates were elected: Naaja Nathanielsen (IA), 1,953 votes; and Qarsoq Høegh-Dam (N), 4,619 votes. This was the first Folketing election Siumut participated in without winning a seat, placing fourth.

===== 2022 =====
Results of the 2022 general election held on 1 November 2022:

Party		Votes per municipality					Total Votes	%	Seats
Party		Avan- naata	Kujal- leq	Qeqer- talik	Qeq- qata	Sermer- sooq	Total Votes	%	Seats
Siumut	S	1,963	996	847	1,284	2,348	7,438	38.63%	1
Inuit Ataqatigiit	IA	502	560	547	619	2,616	4,844	25.16%	1
Democrats	D	639	474	270	449	1,822	3,654	18.98%	0
Naleraq	N	475	175	274	565	927	2,416	12.55%	0
Atassut	A	178	62	111	167	210	728	3.78%	0
Cooperation Party	SA	16	15	11	18	116	176	0.91%	0
Valid votes		3,773	2,282	2,060	3,102	8,039	19,256	100.00%	2
Blank votes		33	32	31	59	130	285	1.44%	
Rejected votes – other		26	17	12	24	113	192	0.97%	
Total polled		3,832	2,331	2,103	3,185	8,282	19,733	47.77%	
Registered electors		7,945	4,754	4,585	6,757	17,264	41,305		
Turnout		48.23%	49.03%	45.87%	47.14%	47.97%	47.77%		

The following candidates were elected: Aaja Chemnitz (IA), 4,296 votes; and Aki-Matilda Høegh-Dam (S), 6,670 votes.

==== 2010s ====
===== 2019 =====
Results of the 2019 general election held on 5 June 2019:

Party		Votes per municipality					Total Votes	%	Seats
Party		Avan- naata	Kujal- leq	Qeqer- talik	Qeq- qata	Sermer- sooq	Total Votes	%	Seats
Inuit Ataqatigiit	IA	609	774	772	939	3,773	6,867	34.35%	1
Siumut	S	1,417	925	658	952	2,111	6,063	30.33%	1
Democrats	D	443	269	241	239	1,066	2,258	11.30%	0
Nunatta Qitornai	NQ	538	143	221	231	489	1,622	8.11%	0
Partii Naleraq	PN	243	79	151	445	646	1,564	7.82%	0
Atassut	A	180	279	127	244	268	1,098	5.49%	0
Cooperation Party	SA	61	53	27	68	309	518	2.59%	0
Valid votes		3,491	2,522	2,197	3,118	8,662	19,990	100.00%	2
Blank votes		33	50	29	69	178	359	1.74%	
Rejected votes – other		21	35	18	35	117	226	1.10%	
Total polled		3,545	2,607	2,244	3,222	8,957	20,575	49.77%	
Registered electors		7,750	4,882	4,900	6,974	16,838	41,344		
Turnout		45.74%	53.40%	45.80%	46.20%	53.20%	49.77%		

The following candidates were elected: Aki-Matilda Høegh-Dam (S), 3,475 votes; and Aaja Chemnitz (IA), 5,669 votes.

===== 2015 =====
Results of the 2015 general election held on 18 June 2015:

Party		Votes per municipality				Total Votes	%	Seats
Party		Kujal- leq	Qaasuit- sup	Qeq- qata	Sermer- sooq	Total Votes	%	Seats
Inuit Ataqatigiit	IA	1,143	1,926	958	3,887	7,914	39.17%	1
Siumut	S	1,216	2,810	1,621	2,207	7,854	38.87%	1
Democrats	D	145	332	215	1,160	1,852	9.17%	0
Atassut	A	212	427	302	587	1,528	7.56%	0
Partii Naleraq	PN	86	413	235	324	1,058	5.24%	0
Valid votes		2,802	5,908	3,331	8,165	20,206	100.00%	2
Blank votes		48	72	42	86	248	1.20%	
Rejected votes – other		26	55	33	120	234	1.13%	
Total polled		2,876	6,035	3,406	8,371	20,688	50.40%	
Registered electors		5,196	12,561	6,961	16,330	41,048		
Turnout		55.35%	48.05%	48.93%	51.26%	50.40%		

The following candidates were elected: Aleqa Hammond (S), 3,759 votes; and Aaja Chemnitz (IA), 2,541 votes.

===== 2011 =====
Results of the 2011 general election held on 15 September 2011:

Party		Votes per municipality				Total Votes	%	Seats
Party		Kujal- leq	Qaasuit- sup	Qeq- qata	Sermer- sooq	Total Votes	%	Seats
Inuit Ataqatigiit	IA	1,333	2,821	1,558	3,875	9,587	42.61%	1
Siumut	S	1,448	2,723	1,602	2,601	8,374	37.22%	1
Democrats	D	251	820	285	1,475	2,831	12.58%	0
Atassut	A	225	603	321	557	1,706	7.58%	0
Valid votes		3,257	6,967	3,766	8,508	22,498	100.00%	2
Blank votes		37	39	22	117	215	0.91%	
Rejected votes – other		128	173	134	398	833	3.54%	
Total polled		3,422	7,179	3,922	9,023	23,546	57.52%	
Registered electors		5,472	12,676	6,984	15,805	40,937		
Turnout		62.54%	56.63%	56.16%	57.09%	57.52%		

The following candidates were elected: Doris J. Jensen (S), 5,621 votes; and Sara Olsvig (IA), 7,956 votes.

==== 2000s ====
===== 2007 =====
Results of the 2007 general election held on 13 November 2007:

Party		Votes	%	Seats
Inuit Ataqatigiit	IA	8,347	33.25%	1
Siumut	S	8,075	32.16%	1
Democrats	D	4,586	18.27%	0
Atassut	A	4,097	16.32%	0
Valid votes		25,105	100.00%	2
Blank votes		218	0.85%	
Rejected votes – other		266	1.04%	
Total polled		25,589	64.45%	
Registered electors		39,706		

The following candidates were elected: Juliane Henningsen (IA), 5,170 votes; and Lars-Emil Johansen (S), 5,621 votes.

===== 2005 =====
Results of the 2005 general election held on 8 February 2005:

Party		Votes	%	Seats
Siumut	S	7,775	33.65%	1
Inuit Ataqatigiit	IA	5,785	25.03%	1
Democrats	D	4,924	21.31%	0
Atassut	A	3,781	16.36%	0
Anthon Frederiksen (Independent)		784	3.39%	0
Niels Fly Olsen (Independent)		59	0.26%	0
Valid votes		23,108	100.00%	2
Blank votes		185	0.79%	
Rejected votes – other		232	0.99%	
Total polled		23,525	59.64%	
Registered electors		39,447		

The following candidates were elected: Lars-Emil Johansen (S), 4,784 votes; and Kuupik Kleist (IA), 5,187 votes.

===== 2001 =====
Results of the 2001 general election held on 20 November 2001:

Party		Votes	%	Seats
Inuit Ataqatigiit	IA	7,172	30.83%	1
Siumut	S	6,033	25.94%	1
Atassut	A	5,138	22.09%	0
Per Berthelsen (Independent)		3,654	15.71%	0
Otto Steenholdt (Independent)		780	3.35%	0
Mads Peter Grønvold (Independent)		280	1.20%	0
Lars Pele Berthelsen (Independent)		203	0.87%	0
Valid votes		23,260	100.00%	2
Blank votes		335	1.41%	
Rejected votes – other		224	0.94%	
Total polled		23,819	61.53%	
Registered electors		38,710		

The following candidates were elected: Lars-Emil Johansen (S), 5,097 votes; and Kuupik Kleist (IA), 6,369 votes.

==== 1990s ====
===== 1998 =====
Results of the 1998 general election held on 11 March 1998:

Party		Votes	%	Seats
Siumut	S	8,502	36.51%	1
Atassut	A	8,404	36.09%	1
Inuit Ataqatigiit	IA	4,988	21.42%	0
Anthon Frederiksen (Independent)		1,147	4.93%	0
Mads Peter Grønvold (Independent)		118	0.51%	0
Centre Party		99	0.43%	0
Niels H. Pedersen (Independent)		28	0.12%	0
Valid votes		23,286	100.00%	2
Blank votes		135	0.56%	
Rejected votes – other		756	3.13%	
Total polled		24,177	63.37%	
Registered electors		38,155		

The following candidates were elected: Ellen Kristensen (A), 3,941 votes; and Hans-Pavia Rosing (S), 3,608 votes.

===== 1994 =====
Results of the 1994 general election held on 21 September 1994:

Party		Votes	%	Seats
Atassut	A	7,501	34.73%	1
Hans-Pavia Rosing (Independent)		7,315	33.87%	1
Aqqaluk Lynge (Independent)		2,076	9.61%	0
Peter Grønvold Samuelsen (Independent)		1,682	7.79%	0
Centre Party		1,605	7.43%	0
Kista Lynge Høegh (Independent)		1,416	6.56%	0
Valid votes		21,595	100.00%	2
Blank votes		306	1.37%	
Rejected votes – other		459	2.05%	
Total polled		22,360	58.67%	
Registered electors		38,113		

The following candidates were elected: Hans-Pavia Rosing (i), 7,315 votes; and Otto Steenholdt (A), 4,541 votes.

===== 1990 =====
Results of the 1990 general election held on 12 December 1990:

Party		Votes	%	Seats
Siumut	S	8,272	42.77%	1
Atassut	A	7,087	36.65%	1
Inuit Ataqatigiit	IA	3,281	16.97%	0
Polar Party		366	1.89%	0
Arne Ib Nielsen (Independent)		333	1.72%	0
Valid votes		19,339	100.00%	2
Blank votes		185	0.92%	
Rejected votes – other		556	2.77%	
Total polled		20,080	50.82%	
Registered electors		39,511		

The following candidates were elected: Hans-Pavia Rosing (S), 8,128 votes; and Otto Steenholdt (A), 5,417 votes.

==== 1980s ====
===== 1988 =====
Results of the 1988 general election held on 10 May 1988:

Party		Votes	%	Seats
Siumut	S	8,415	40.07%	1
Atassut	A	8,135	38.74%	1
Inuit Ataqatigiit	IA	3,628	17.28%	0
Polar Party		821	3.91%	0
Valid votes		20,999	100.00%	2
Blank votes		216	0.97%	
Rejected votes – other		953	4.30%	
Total polled		22,168	57.88%	
Registered electors		38,301		

The following candidates were elected: Hans-Pavia Rosing (S), 5,446 votes; and Otto Steenholdt (A), 6,429 votes.

===== 1987 =====
Results of the 1987 general election held on 8 September 1987:

Party		Votes	%	Seats
Siumut	S	6,944	43.28%	1
Atassut	A	6,627	41.30%	1
Inuit Ataqatigiit	IA	2,001	12.47%	0
Polar Party		474	2.95%	0
Valid votes		16,046	100.00%	2
Blank votes		170	1.00%	
Rejected votes – other		764	4.50%	
Total polled		16,980	44.92%	
Registered electors		37,800		

The following candidates were elected: Hans-Pavia Rosing (S), 3,861 votes; and Otto Steenholdt (A), 5,662 votes.

===== 1984 =====
Results of the 1984 general election held on 10 January 1984:

Party		Votes	%	Seats
Atassut	A	9,308	43.51%	1
Siumut	S	9,148	42.76%	1
Inuit Ataqatigiit	IA	2,939	13.74%	0
Valid votes		21,395	100.00%	2
Blank votes		128	0.58%	
Rejected votes – other		505	2.29%	
Total polled		22,028	63.95%	
Registered electors		34,448		

The following candidates were elected: Preben Lange (S), 4,352 votes; and Otto Steenholdt (A), 5,875 votes.

===== 1981 =====
Results of the 1981 general election held on 8 December 1981:

Party		Votes	%	Seats
Atassut	A	9,223	48.86%	1
Siumut	S	7,126	37.75%	1
Aqqaluk Lynge (Independent)		1,635	8.66%	0
Jens Geisler (Independent)		894	4.74%	0
Valid votes		18,878	100.00%	2
Blank votes		226	1.14%	
Rejected votes – other		699	3.53%	
Total polled		19,803	61.00%	
Registered electors		32,466		

The following candidates were elected: Preben Lange (S), 4,455 votes; and Otto Steenholdt (A), 7,500 votes.

==== 1970s ====
===== 1979 =====
Results of the 1979 general election held on 23 October 1979:

Party		Votes	%	Seats
Atassut	A	6,390	44.89%	1
Siumut	S	6,273	44.07%	1
Labour Party		1,572	11.04%	0
Valid votes		14,235	100.00%	2
Blank votes		238	1.57%	
Rejected votes – other		719	4.73%	
Total polled		15,192	50.32%	
Registered electors		30,191		

The following candidates were elected: Preben Lange (S), 2,589 votes; and Otto Steenholdt (A), 4,826 votes.

===== 1977 =====
Results of the 1977 general election held on 15 February 1977:

Party		Party			Alliance		
Party		Votes	%	Seats	Votes	%	Seats
Lars-Emil Johansen (Independent)	Kf2	5,915	33.60%	1	9,214	52.34%	1
Moses Olsen (Independent)	Kf2	1,977	11.23%	0	9,214	52.34%	1
Thue Christiansen (Independent)	Kf2	1,322	7.51%	0	9,214	52.34%	1
Otto Steenholdt (Independent)	Kf1	4,645	26.38%	1	8,391	47.66%	1
Ole Berglund (Independent)	Kf1	2,556	14.52%	0	8,391	47.66%	1
Arqalo Abelsen (Independent)	Kf1	1,190	6.76%	0	8,391	47.66%	1
Valid votes		17,605	100.00%	2	17,605	100.00%	2
Blank votes		144	0.80%				
Rejected votes – other		240	1.33%				
Total polled		17,989	70.02%				
Registered electors		25,691					

The following candidates were elected: Lars-Emil Johansen (Kf2), 5,915 votes; and Otto Steenholdt (Kf1), 4,645 votes.

===== 1975 =====
Results of the 1975 general election held on 9 January 1975:

Party		Party			Alliance		
Party		Votes	%	Seats	Votes	%	Seats
Lars-Emil Johansen (Independent)	Kf2	7,775	46.70%	1	9,521	57.19%	1
Odak Olsen (Independent)	Kf2	1,746	10.49%	0	9,521	57.19%	1
Nikolaj Rosing (Independent)	Kf1	3,638	21.85%	1	7,128	42.81%	1
Knud Hertling (Independent)	Kf1	3,490	20.96%	0	7,128	42.81%	1
Valid votes		16,649	100.00%	2	16,649	100.00%	2
Blank votes		232	1.36%				
Rejected votes – other		189	1.11%				
Total polled		17,070	68.73%				
Registered electors		24,838					

The following candidates were elected: Lars-Emil Johansen (Kf2), 7,775 votes; and Nikolaj Rosing (Kf1), 3,638 votes.
