= Soprani =

Soprani is an Italian surname. Notable people with the surname include:

- Luciano Soprani (1946–1999), Italian fashion designer
- Raffaele Soprani (1612–1672), Italian art historian
- Wanda Soprani (born 1940), Italian artistic gymnast
