= Qarsoq Høegh-Dam =

Greenlandic politician (born 1989)

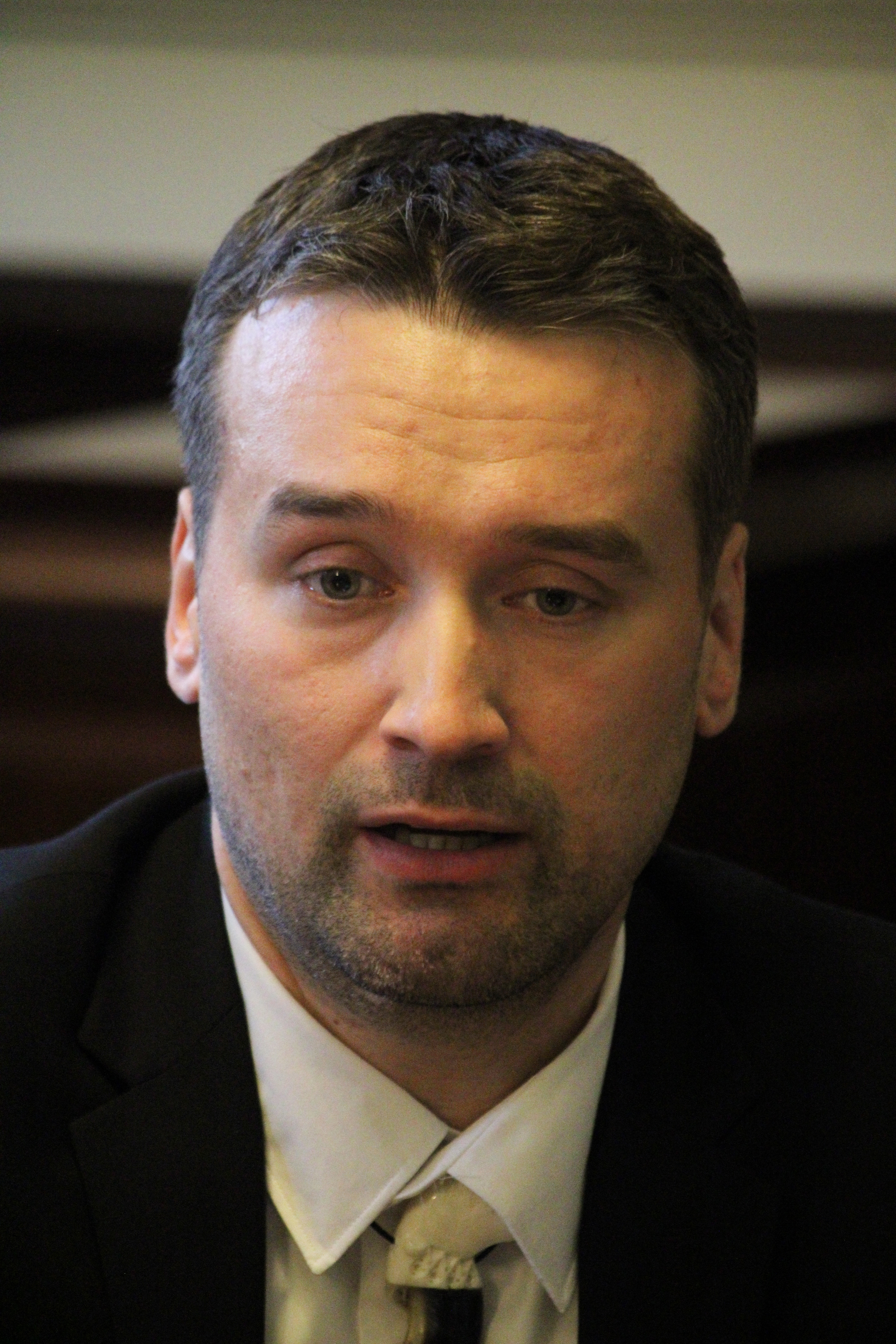
- Høegh-Dam in 2026

Member of the Folketing
- Incumbent
- Assumed office 24 March 2026
- Preceded by: Aki-Matilda Høegh-Dam
- Constituency: Greenland at-large

Personal details
- Born: 2 October 1989 (age 36) Nuuk, Greenland
- Party: Naleraq (since 2026)
- Other party: Siumut (until 2024)
- Relatives: Aki-Matilda Høegh-Dam (sister); Aaja Chemnitz (cousin)

Qarsoq Høegh-Dam (born 1989) is a Greenlandic politician who was elected member of the Folketing in 2026. In April 2021, he was a member of the Inatsisartut. He is the brother of Aki-Matilda Høegh-Dam.
