= Ane Hansen =

Ane Hansen may refer to:

- Ane Hansen (politician), Greenlandic politician
- Ane Håkansson Hansen (born 1975), Danish curler
