= Artek =

Artek may refer to:

- Arctic Technology Centre
- Artek (camp), an international children center near Hurzuf, Crimea
- Artek (company), a Finnish furniture manufacturer
- 1956 Artek, an asteroid
