= Eva Rorandelli =

Italian artist and model (born 1977)

- Born: Florence, Italy
- Education: Accademia di Belle Arti of Florence
- Occupations: Fashion designer, artist, former model
- Known for: Founding Evaro Italia
- Spouse: Haakon Faste (married 2002–present)
- Website: evaro.it

Eva Rorandelli is an Italian fashion designer, artist and former model. She is the founder and creative director of Evaro Italia, a women's fashion label based in Florence, Italy.

== Early Career ==
Rorandelli studied painting at the Accademia di Belle Arti in Florence, Italy. In 1999, she received a fellowship from the Woodstock School of Art. As an artist, her paintings, videos and performance work have been exhibited in Europe and the United States, including exhibitions at the Lincoln Center for Performing Arts in New York, Galleria Civica di Arte Moderna e Contemporanea di Torino, and Fondazione D’Ars in Milan. Her work has been described as evocative, disturbing, and empowering examples of posthuman art.

Rorandelli began a career in modeling after being discovered walking on the streets in New York in 1999. After signing with Q Management NYC, she was featured in campaigns by Flavio Castellani, John Lewis, Valentino and Lee, La Senza, Maidenform, Passport, and Nordstrom. Additionally, she appeared in magazines including Flare, Vegas, Brides, and Vanidades, and walked for designers Gugliemo Cappone, Luciano Soprani, Elie Saab, Marina Babini, Yumi Katsura and Michino Koshino in Paris, Milan, San Francisco, and New York.

== Evaro Italia ==
In 2015, Rorandelli founded Evaro Italia, a Florence-based women's fashion label. Building on her family's history in Italian leather goods and fashion manufacturing, the brand produces ready-to-wear clothing, outerwear, and accessories, alongside Evaro Alta Moda, a line of custom-made couture garments. Her designs emphasize Italian craftsmanship, textiles and traditional tailoring techniques, with all garments and accessories produced entirely in Italy.

Each season Evaro Italia presents fashion collections in Italy and the United States, which have included runway shows in New York, San Francisco, and Milan.

== Personal life ==
Rorandelli is married to American designer Haakon Faste.
