= 2021 Greenlandic general election =

- 6 April 2021
- All 31 seats in the Inatsisartut; 16 seats needed for a majority
- Turnout: 65.92% (▼5.94pp)
Party	Leader	Vote %	Seats	+/–
Inuit Ataqatigiit	Múte Bourup Egede	37.44	12	+4
Siumut	Erik Jensen	30.10	10	+1
Naleraq	Hans Enoksen	12.26	4	0
Democrats	Jens-Frederik Nielsen	9.25	3	−3
Atassut	Aqqalu C. Jerimiassen	7.08	2	0
This lists parties that won seats. See the complete results below.
Most voted-for party by municipality and city (numbered circles)
Prime Minister before	Prime Minister after
Kim Kielsen; Siumut	Múte Bourup Egede; Inuit Ataqatigiit

Snap general elections were held in Greenland on 6 April 2021 alongside local elections. Inuit Ataqatigiit emerged as the largest party, winning 12 of the 31 seats in the Inatsisartut. The governing Siumut party finished second with 10 seats.

== Background ==
In November 2020, Prime Minister Kim Kielsen was defeated in a leadership election for the Siumut party, losing to Erik Jensen. However, Kielsen did not step down as Prime Minister. Growing rivalry between the two and disagreement over the Kvanefjeld mine led to the Democrats pulling out of the coalition government, leaving Siumut and Nunatta Qitornai with only 12 of the 31 seats in the Inatsisartut. Kielsen failed to form a new coalition government and the Inatsisartut voted to hold snap elections.

Rare earth mining was expected to be a key issue in the elections, with the Kvanefjeld deposit in the south of the island being subject to public hearings and party campaigning. The metals found in Greenland are used to manufacture components in, for example, wind turbines and electric vehicles. The process is polluting but the resources experienced an increase in price due to increasing demand for electric vehicles. Uranium is also found in Greenland, but the mining of the resource faced strong opposition from residents. Greenland Minerals Limited, an Australian-based Chinese-owned company had been planning a project to mine in the area of Kvanefjeld since 2007 and was on its "final hurdle".

The opposition party Inuit Ataqatigiit called for a moratorium on uranium mining, putting into question the wider rare earth mining project, whilst the ruling Siumut party voiced support for the project, citing economic growth as a key reason. In a survey to determine the public opinion on mining in the Kvanefjeld deposit, 63% opposed such activity, of which 45% were very much against. Other issues, such as independence, COVID-19 policies, foreign policy, and opinions on democratic institutions were considered less important than the debate over mining.

== Electoral system ==
The 31 members of the Inatsisartut are elected by proportional representation in a single nationwide constituency. Seats are allocated using the d'Hondt method.

== Opinion polls ==
Four polls have been conducted since 2019. In a poll conducted shortly before the election, the Inuit Ataqatigiit received 36% of the votes with the Siumut in second with 23%.

Date	Siumut	IA	Democrats	Naleraq	Atassut	NQ	SA	Lead
April 2021	23.2%	36.2%	13.4%	16.4%	6.5%	2.1%	2.2%	13.0%
April 2021	8	12	4	5	2	0	0	4
February 2021	29.4%	38.4%	11.3%	12.2%	6.8%	1.2%	0.7%	9.0%
February 2021	9	13	3	4	2	0	0	4
December 2020	31.0%	34.5%	12.7%	11.0%	6.1%	2.6%	2.1%	3.5%
December 2020	10	12	4	3	2	0	0	2
January 2019	28.7%	30.6%	21.7%	10.3%	4.5%	2.2%	2.5%	1.9%
January 2019	10	10	7	3	1	0	0	Tie
2018 general election	27.4%	25.8%	19.7%	13.6%	6.0%	4.1%	3.5%	1.6%
2018 general election	9	8	6	4	2	1	1	1

== Results ==
Party	Votes	%	+/–	Seats	+/–
Inuit Ataqatigiit	9,933	37.44	+11.66	12	+4
Siumut	7,986	30.10	+2.66	10	+1
Naleraq	3,252	12.26	–1.29	4	0
Democrats	2,454	9.25	–10.44	3	–3
Atassut	1,878	7.08	+1.12	2	0
Nunatta Qitornai	639	2.41	–1.04	0	–1
Cooperation Party	376	1.42	–2.69	0	–1
Independents	10	0.04	New	0	New
Total	26,528	100.00	–	31	0
Valid votes	26,528	97.86			
Invalid/blank votes	581	2.14			
Total votes	27,109	100.00			
Registered voters/turnout	41,126	65.92	–5.94		
Source: Qinersineq.gl

By party, those elected were:

- Inuit Ataqatigiit (12): Aqqaluaq B. Egede, Múte Bourup Egede, Stine Egede, Sofia Geisler, Eqaluk Høegh, Kristian Jeremiassen, Mimi Karlsen, Kalistat Lund, Asii Chemnitz Narup, Naaja Nathanielsen, Peter Olsen, Mariane Paviasen
- Siumut (10): Qarsoq Høegh-Dam, Aslak Vilhelm Jensen, Doris Jakobsen Jensen, Erik Jensen, Kim Kielsen, Mala Høy Kúko, Vivian Motzfeldt, Anders Simon Olsen, Lars Poulsen, Jess Svane
- Naleraq (4): Pele Broberg, Hans Enoksen, Jens Napãtôᴋ', Emanuel Nûko
- Democrats (3): Jens-Frederik Nielsen, Nivi Olsen, Anna Wangenheim
- Atassut (2): Siverth Heilmann, Aqqalu Clasen Jerimiassen

== Aftermath and government formation ==
After the election results came in, Inuit Ataqatigiit leader Múte Bourup Egede thanked voters for their win while Siumut leader Erik Jensen said that his party would wait to see what IA would offer during the coalition negotiations. Siumut Prime Minister and former leader Kim Kielsen received more personal votes than Jensen, which led to a continuation of the party infighting between the two as Jensen affirmed his desire to continue as leader after the election and deputy leader Inga Dora Markussen partially blamed Kielsen for the loss.

On 8 April Egede said that his party had begun negotiations with other parties the day before and that he expected a coalition to be formed after 15 April, at which point IA would have met with each party a few times. After Egede expressed a desire for a government with at least 16 seats, the second round of negotiations began on 9 April; later that day the Democrats ruled out forming a coalition with IA citing irreconcilable views and wishing Egede luck in forming a coalition. On 13 April, Egede announced that negotiations with Siumut had also fallen through, blaming infighting within Siumut for their inability to come to an agreement.

On 16 April, it was announced that IA had successfully negotiated a coalition agreement with fellow pro-independence party Naleraq which would hold a combined 16 seats in the legislature (a one seat majority). Atassut announced that they would be willing to support the coalition.
