= Jørgen Boassen =

Danish-Greenlandic political figure (born 1974)

Jørgen Boassen (born 1974) is a Greenlandic bricklayer and political activist known for his support of incumbent US president Donald Trump. Boassen rose to notoriety in 2025 following a series of statements by Trump about the United States acquiring Greenland, an autonomous territory in the Kingdom of Denmark. In August 2025, he was mentioned in the context of covert US operations to foment secessionism and anti-Danish sentiment in Greenland. Danish media including DR reported that these three individuals were conducting influence operations in Greenland such as collecting lists of American-friendly individuals, Trump critics, and arguments to use against Danish rule. He decried the assassination of Charlie Kirk in September 2025.

In September 2026, Frihedsbrevet, using hidden recordings of conversations between Boassen and its mole, 21-year old theology student Christian Ursilva, reported that Boassen was attempting to secure backdoor U.S. investments in Greenland. Fencker and Dans were also allegedly involved, having held a Zoom call with Ursilva on June 24.

== Early life ==
He was born in Qaqortoq, a small coastal town in southern Greenland, in 1974 and raised by a single mother and maternal grandmother.

== Political activities ==
After the 2020 US election, Boassen said on 6 November that he thought Biden would underprioritize Greenland. In November 2024, he expressed skepticism about building Praxis in Greenland.

=== Donald Trump Jr. visit to Greenland ===
During the 2024 United States presidential election, Boassen canvassed for the Trump campaign on the streets of Pittsburgh, Pennsylvania. During the visit of Donald Trump Jr. and Charlie Kirk to Nuuk on 7 January 2025, Boassen was their guide, although he also stated his opposition to American acquisition of Greenland. Boassen at the time also expressed interest in running in the 2025 Greenlandic general election held on 11 March. On how the visit came about, Boassen stated that he had been contacted by Charlie Kirk, founder of Turning Point USA, who had offered him to become their guide.

Local media reported that Boassen coordinated a group of up to 15 Greenlanders who waited for the president's son wearing "Make America Great Again" caps and accompanied him throughout his four-and-a-half-hour stay on the island. Following Trump Jr.'s visit to Greenland, Politiken characterised him on 7 January as "unofficial liaison officer between Greenland and the Trump camp". Kuno Fencker and Boassen met with Thomas Dans when the latter arrived in Nuuk on 11 January.

=== Later activities ===
Dans and Boassen travelled to the United States on 13 January, having organised a Greenlandic delegation to the second inauguration of Donald Trump, while Pele Broberg attended a watch party of Trump's inauguration speech at Greenland's Parliament, formed in case the US President would mention Greenland. Trump did not mention Greenland, but Broberg nonetheless welcomed Trump's interest, both for increasing the island's value and for "freaking out Denmark". Boassen was invited to Washington D.C. to attend Donald Trump's inauguration ceremony and to talk to Americans about Greenland. He filmed himself in the House of Representatives and photographed himself in the West Wing of the White House. He visited Mar-a-Lago.

To Jyllands-Posten, Boassen told in March 2025 that he had played a role in making the Americans fund an annual dog sledding race on the occasion of the visit of US vice president JD Vance and his wife Usha Vance to Greenland on 28 March. The New York Times described in March 2025 Boassen as "Trump's No. 1 Fan in Greenland".

On 11 March 2025, Boassen told Il Post:

We will become an independent state. We are only 56 thousand people, we cannot have everything, and the United States is our closest ally, regardless of who the president is, even if it is not Trump. I'm thinking of an association of some kind, like Puerto Rico

— Boassen to Il Post, 11 March 2025

For the second round of the 2025 Romanian presidential election in May 2025, Boassen travelled with Dans to Bucharest, Romania to support George Simion against eventual winner Nicușor Dan, clarifying to HotNews that the trip was financed by Dans' organisation, American Daybreak.

Boassen has said that his work, including travel and living expenses, has been financed by wealthy American donors, who he did not name when asked to do so. By April 2026, he was no longer living in Greenland.

== Altercations with other Greenlanders ==
Ben Taub of The New Yorker magazine "was told by several people [in Nuuk] that Boassen was known for groping women and getting into drunken fights"; Boassen denies these allegations. A man who grew up with Boassen in Qaqortoq told Reuters that, in the 1990s, Boassen had stabbed him in the shoulder with a knife, due to a rivalry over a girl.

Boassen has been banned from Nuuk's public swimming pool, from a mixed martial arts gym in the city, and from the Hotel Hans Egede; Boassen claims that he was banned from the MMA gym due to his political association with Donald Trump, while staff at the hotel say they had banned him for "repeatedly harassing or threatening patrons." Boassen has "repeatedly hurled verbal abuse at Greenlandic politicians in public," including 2 parliamentarians at a café in Nuuk in 2025.

In early February 2025, Boassen stated that he had received death threats. On 10 March 2025, Boassen stated that two days prior he had been violently assaulted at a bar and had reported the alleged crime to the police on Greenland.

== Other activities ==
On 19 May, Statstidende, the official government gazette of Denmark reported that Boassen's company founded in 2019 had filed for bankruptcy. Boassen stated to B.T. that the bankruptcy was caused by a lack of time due to his political activities. He is a former boxer. In February 2025, Boassen said that he has supported Trump since his 2016 campaign. On his support for Trump, Boassen told The Washington Post in an interview published on 14 January that "The more the Danish media hated Trump [during his first term] the more I liked him", adding "My friends were all laughing at me".
