= Ole Peder Bertelsen =

Danish-born oil trader and entrepreneur (1930–2018)

Ole Peder Bertelsen (30 November 1930 – 10 July 2018) was a Danish-born oil trader and a London fashion trade entrepreneur. In 1985, he brought Ralph Lauren’s brand to England. He was the son of a horse dealer and was born in the seaport of Esbjerg on the Jutland Peninsula on November 30, 1930. He graduated from Copenhagen University with a degree in Economics and joined the Shell oil company where he worked for 15 years. He made his money in oil in the 1980s. Then, in 1982, he was an investment advisor to an oil company that had, as part of its investments, a Colorado ranch. The neighbor of that ranch, Ralph Lauren, wanted to buy the property and, in exchange, Lauren offered his European distribution and his London shop to Bertelsen. In the 1980’s, Bertelsen was called “the most powerful fashion entrepreneur” by The London Standard. His company, Aguecheek, had many London boutiques including those for Ungaro, Valentino, Katharine Hamnett, Krizia, Walter Steiger, Giorgio Armani, Tiffany, Luciano Soprani and Comme des Garcons Homme Plu. He opened Gallery 28, a Mayfair outlet with many designers' clothes.

He married Prue Hyne in 1960 and they had three sons.
