= Emanuel Nûko =

Greenlandic politician (born 1992)

Emanuel Nûko (born 1992) is a Greenlandic politician from the Naleraq party. He was elected to the Sermersooq municipal council and the Inatsisartut, Greenland's parliament, in the 2021 elections.

== Early life and education ==
Emanuel Nûko was born in Ammassalik in 1992.

== Political career ==
As a member of Naleraq, he was elected in the 2021 election to the Inatsisartut, Greenland's parliament. He was also elected to the Sermersooq municipal council and he sought to serve in both simultaneously. Prior to his election, he served as an alternative member from Naleraq in the Inatsisartut. Among his stated priorities were increasing the production and quotas of narwhal meat in his constituency.

In September 2022, the Inatsisartut began debating whether to lift parliamentary immunity for Nûko – a legal immunity that shields members from prosecution – who was under police investigation for unknown reasons. His immunity was lifted by the Inatsisartut, and in October, he subsequently requested permission to take a leave of absence; politician Paneeraq Olsen was named his replacement. He was also granted a leave of absence from his municipal work. In 2023, a Greenlandic newspaper, Sermitsiaq, published his criminal charges: Refusing to comply with a police order and committing violence. His trial was set for 9 February 2023 in a Tasiilaq court. He was acquitted, and prosecutors appealed the acquittal.
