= Pipaluk Lynge =

Greenlandic politician

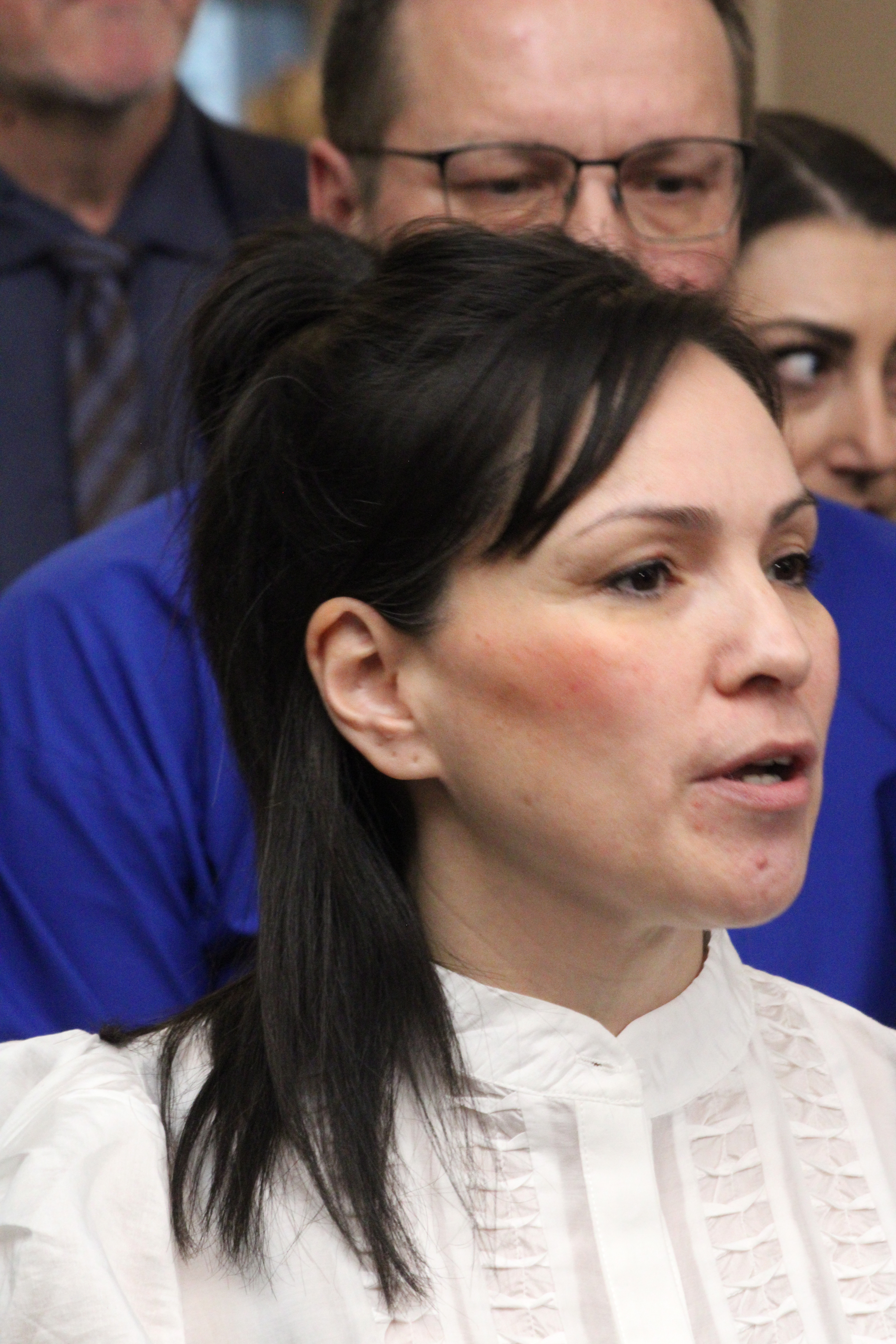
Lynge in 2026

Pipaluk Lynge (born 13 April 1984), formerly Pipaluk Lynge-Rasmussen, is a Greenlandic politician (Inuit Ataqatigiit), who is a member of the Greenlandic parliament, the Inatsisartut.

== Life and career ==
Pipaluk Lynge-Rasmussen was born on 13 April 1984 in Nuuk. She graduated from Aasiaat Gymnasium in 2005. She then studied cultural and social history. She completed her bachelor's degree in 2011 and her candidate's degree in 2015. She then worked for a year as a teacher at a Gymnasium in Nuuk. From 2016 to 2018, she was a consultant at the Municipality of Sermersooq. From 2020 to 2021, she worked as a TV and radio presenter in numerous children's television and radio programs. She has two children with her husband.

== Political career ==
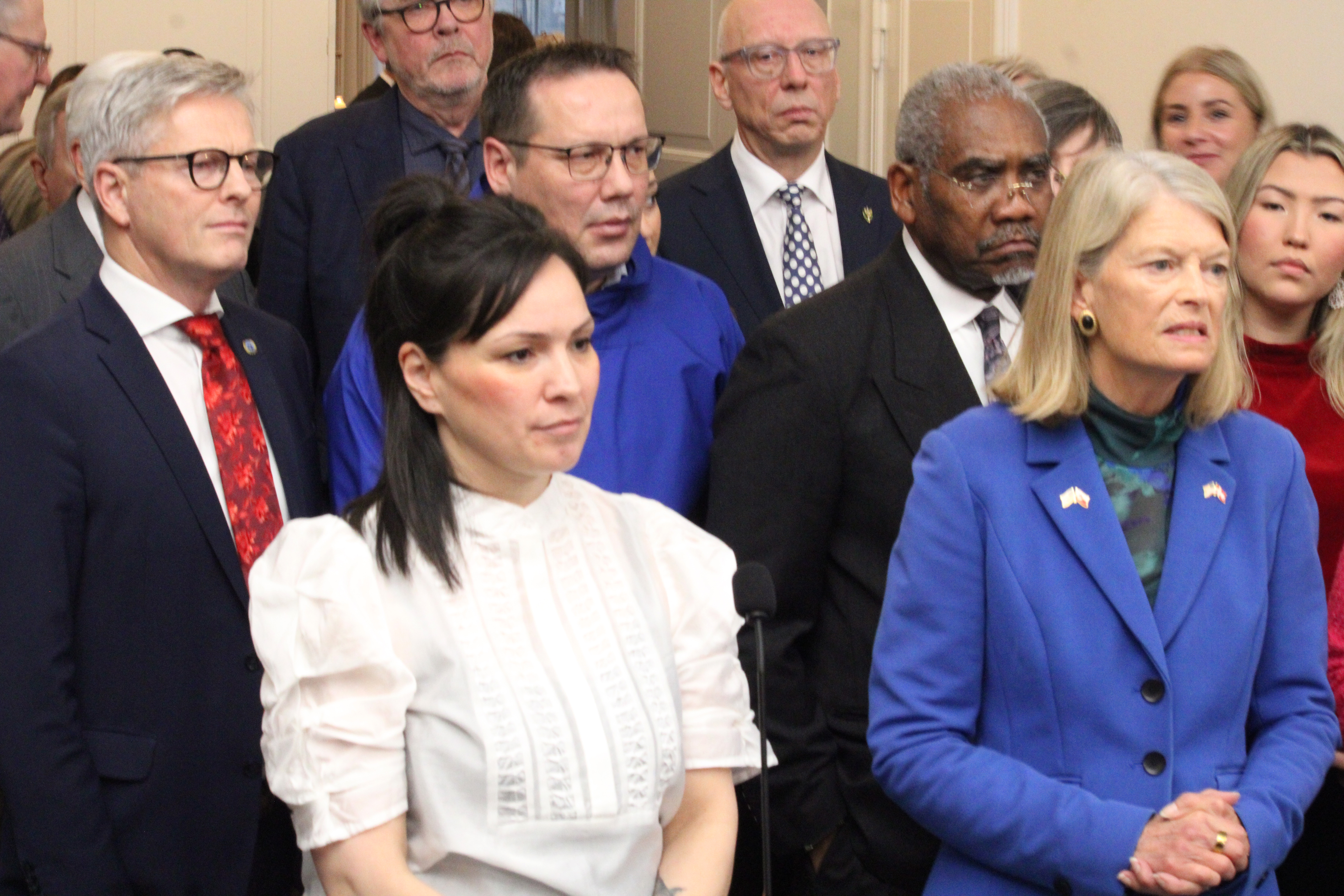
Lynge with Danish, Greenlandic and U.S. politicians at Christiansborg in Copenhagen during the Greenland crisis, January 2026

Lynge-Rasmussen ran in the 2013 local elections and became third deputy for Inuit Ataqatigiit in the municipality of Sermersooq. She also ran in the 2014 general election but received only 20 votes. She ran again in the 2017 local elections but was not elected. In the 2021 parliamentary elections, she became the 4th deputy for Inuit Ataqatigiit and entered parliament, Inatsisartut, as a substitute.
