= Sofia Geisler =

Greenlandic politician (born 1963)

Member of the Greenlandic Parliament
- In office 2018 – 15 February 2022

Personal details
- Born: 23 January 1963 (age 63) Sisimiut, Greenland, Kingdom of Denmark
- Citizenship: Kingdom of Denmark
- Party: Inuit Ataqatigiit (IA)
- Profession: Journalist

Sofia Johanna Geisler (born 23 January 1963) is a Greenlandic politician (Inuit Ataqatigiit) and journalist.

== Early life and career ==
Geisler is the second of three daughters by Kristoffer Geisler and Dorthennguaq Olsvig. She finished the Folkeskole in Sisimiut in 1979 and then attended Ilinniarfissuaq until 1982. She then trained as a journalist at the Niuernermik Ilinniarfik until 1990. She then studied economics at Aalborg University until 1994. From 1995 to 1998, she was Communications Officer at Royal Greenland. From 1998 to 1999, she was chief editor of radio news at Kalaallit Nunaata Radioa. From 2000 to 2007, she worked as a training manager at a journalism school. She then returned to Royal Greenland where she was Communications Advisor from 2007 to 2009. From 2009 to 2011, she was employed in the Qaasuitsup Kommunia. From 2011 to 2014, she was head of communications at the government, from 2014 to 2017 at KNI and 2017 at Mittarfeqarfiit. From 2017 to 2018, she was a presenter on Kalaallit Nunaata Radioa. She also works as a stress coach and mediator.

== Political career ==
Geisler ran in the 2018 general election representing Inuit Ataqatigiit, and was elected to the Inatsisartut with 98 votes. In the 2019 Danish general election, she received 683 votes and thus achieved the first place for Aaja Chemnitz. In the 2021 parliamentary elections, she received 116 votes and thus retained her seat in parliament. On 15 February 2022, she resigned her seat in parliament to become an adviser to the marine conservation organization Ocean North Kalaallit Nunaat.
