= Jens NapãtôK' =

Greenlandic politician (born 1966)

Jens Napãtôᴋ', also known as Jens Napaattooq, is a Greenlandic politician. He is a member of the Inatsisartut, the parliament of Greenland, representing the Naleraq party. He was elected in 2021, made a chairman of two committees, and took a leave of absence after a video surfaced allegedly showing him threatening to attack someone in his home. He underwent treatment for alcohol, and returned to the Inatsisartut by September 2021. He was removed as chairman from his committees in April 2022. In June 2022, he was elected deputy leader of Naleraq.

== Political career ==
In 2005, Napãtôᴋ' resigned from the government after improperly using government funds to buy personal products, including beer, two packs of cigarettes, and services at a strip club. He was a member of the national board for housing, and after four years of appeals, his sentence—having to serve four months in jail and pay a fine of over 100,000 Danish kroner—was upheld, albeit with the fine somewhat reduced.

He was elected to the Inatsisartut in the 2021 election. He was elected with the Naleraq party, and was simultaneously elected to the municipal council of Avannaata.

In April 2021, he applied for sick leave from the Inatsisartut due to family problems, shortly after he was appointed chairman of the committee on finance and tax. He was allegedly shown in a video threatening to attack someone at his home, and the Siumut party reported him to the police. He was then stripped of his chairmanship for the committee on finance and tax, as well as his chairmanship of the committee on fisheries. His party's chairman wished him well, saying that it was taboo to ask for help when needed. The next month, he stated that he had started treatment for alcohol, and he wished to return to the Inatsisartut once it was completed.

He returned by September, and threatened to vote against his party's budget proposal, unless a tax on halibut were removed. He was again made chairman of both committees on his return, although a change in the coalition government in April 2022 resulted in him being replaced by Hans Aronsen (Inuit Ataqatigiit, for fisheries) and Anders Olsen (Siumut, for law). He stated that the coalition—between Inuit Ataqatigiit and Naleraq—had been a dysfunctional partnership; that Inuit Ataqatigiit often refused to take responsibility; and that there was no notice that their coalition was ending and would be replaced by an Inuit Ataqatigiit–Siumut partnership. In June, Hans Enoksen resigned as the leader of Naleraq, and Napãtôᴋ' and Pele Broberg were nominated to succeed him. Napãtôᴋ' declined to serve as the party's leader for personal reasons, but he was elected as deputy leader without opposition.
