= Agnethe Davidsen =

Greenlandic politician (1947–2007)

- Born: 29 August 1947; Nuuk, Greenland
- Died: 25 November 2007 (aged 60); Nuuk, Greenland
- Occupations: judge, vice mayor, mayor
- Spouse: Aqqaluartaaq Davidsen
- Children: Søren (1965), Heidi (1967)
- Parents: Villy Wael (father); Agathe Lund (mother)

Agnethe Davidsen (29 August 1947 – 25 November 2007) was a Greenlandic judge who was the first female government minister in Greenland and only the second female mayor of Nuuk, the capital of Greenland, where she was mayor for more than 14 years until she died suddenly at the age of 60.

== Early years ==
Agnethe was born in 1947 to mother Agathe Lund and father Villy Wael (1928–98), but she was raised by her grandmother. At 16, she met her future husband, the blacksmith Aqqaluartaaq Davidsen, whom she married in 1966, and they had two children, Søren (1965) and Heidi (1967).

In 1969, seeking more education, she took the children to Ikast, Denmark and graduated in 1970 with a "trade degree in commerce and office." After returning to Greenland, she began working in the national court system in Nuuk. In 1979, she began her work as a circuit judge in the Nuuk district court, a position she held 1979-1983 and again 1989–1993.

== Political life ==
In 1983, Davidsen was appointed to the Parliament (Landsting) as substitute for Hans Pavia Rosing, representing the social democrat-oriented Forward (Siumut) party. Later that year, she was appointed member of parliament for social affairs (a position similar to a governmental minister), thereby becoming the first female member of the Landsstyret.

In 1989, she was elected to the city council of Nuuk, again under the banner of the Forward party, and between 1989 and 1991 held the position of second vice mayor. After the election of 1991, she was appointed first vice mayor, and in 1993 she became presiding officer of the city council and the mayor of the city. Davidsen was only second female mayor of the capital city after Laannguaq Lynge, who occupied the post 1991–1993.

In 1997, Davidsen was inducted by Queen Margrethe II of Denmark into the Order of the Dannebrog. In that year she resigned from political life in Greenland so she could work full-time in Nuuk politics.

She was a vocal advocate for hosting the 2002 Arctic Winter Games, which were held in both Nuuk and in Iqaluit, Canada.

In 2004 Davidsen played herself as the mayor in the 58-minute documentary film, "Dronningen og prinsen med Frederik og Mary i Grønland" (The Queen and Prince with Frederick and Mary in Greenland).

In April 2005, voters returned Davidsen to the mayor's office in Nuuk defeating then deputy mayor, Per Berthelsen, by 2.7 percent of the vote.

She died suddenly in 2007 of a brain hemorrhage while serving as mayor.

== Honors ==
Knight of the Order of the Dannebrog

Political offices
Preceded by Laannguaq Lynge	Mayor, Nuuk; 1993–2007	Succeeded by Nikolaj Heinrich
