= Nikolaj Heinrich =

Politician

Nikolaj Heinrich (born 1938) is a Greenlandic fisherman and politician, who founded the right wing Polar Party and represented it in parliament 1987–1995, but later switched to Siumut. He made a short political comeback as Mayor of Nuuk 2007-08 prior to the 2008 municipal reform in Greenland, which merged Nuuk municipality into Sermersooq.

Political offices
Preceded by Agnethe Davidsen	Mayor, Nuuk; 2007–2008	Succeeded by office abolished
