= Mariane Paviasen =

Greenlandic politician (born 1964/1965)

Mariane Paviasen (born 1964 or 1965) is a Greenlandic politician. She was elected to the Inatsisartut, the parliament of Greenland, during the 2021 general election. She is a member of the Inuit Ataqatigiit party and a vocal opponent to uranium mining.

== Early life and career ==
Mariane Paviasen was born in either 1964 or 1965.

She is a staunch critic of uranium mining. She was concerned about plans to operate an open-pit mine in Narsaq, which would have exposed residents to uranium. In 2013, she formed the Urani? Naamik (Greenlandic for "Uranium? No") movement in response. She publicly raised her concerns about uranium mining with Erik Jensen, the minister for mineral resources, in a 2019 town hall meeting. Prior to her election in the Greenlandic parliament, she worked for a helicopter company at Narsaq.

== Political career ==
Paviasen was elected to the Inatsisartut for the Inuit Ataqatigiit party in April 2021. She and Urani? Naamik challenged the lobbying efforts of mining groups, and the Greenlandic public favored her party as a result. The agricultural industry was one of the most impassioned supporters of her group, since they believed their meat products would no longer be purchased due to concerns over radioactivity. She said Greenland risks "being left with a country that cannot be used for anything" unless action is taken to preserve the natural environment.

She became the minister for housing and infrastructure in November 2021. As minister, she said that in response to new airport in Qaqortoq that may have an impact on one in Narsarsuaq, a working group should investigate.
