= Crew Gold =

International gold mining company

Crew Gold Corporation
- Company type: Public
- Traded as: OSE: CRU; TSX: CRU
- Industry: Mining
- Founded: 1980
- Defunct: 2010
- Fate: Acquired by Severstal
- Headquarters: Weybridge, United Kingdom
- Area served: Global
- Products: Gold
- Number of employees: 1,888, including contractors
- Divisions: LEFA Mine

Crew Gold Corporation was an international gold mining company that operated the LEFA gold mine in Guinea. The company was listed on the Toronto Stock Exchange and secondary listed on the Oslo Stock Exchange with its corporate headquarters in Weybridge, United Kingdom. It has disposed of its interests in the Maco property in the Philippines, the assets of its Nalunaq gold mine in Greenland and the Nugget Pond processing facility in Newfoundland, Canada.

Further details of Crew Gold Corporation's past public filings are located at www.SEDAR.com.
