= Nivi Rosing =

Greenlandic politician (born 2003)

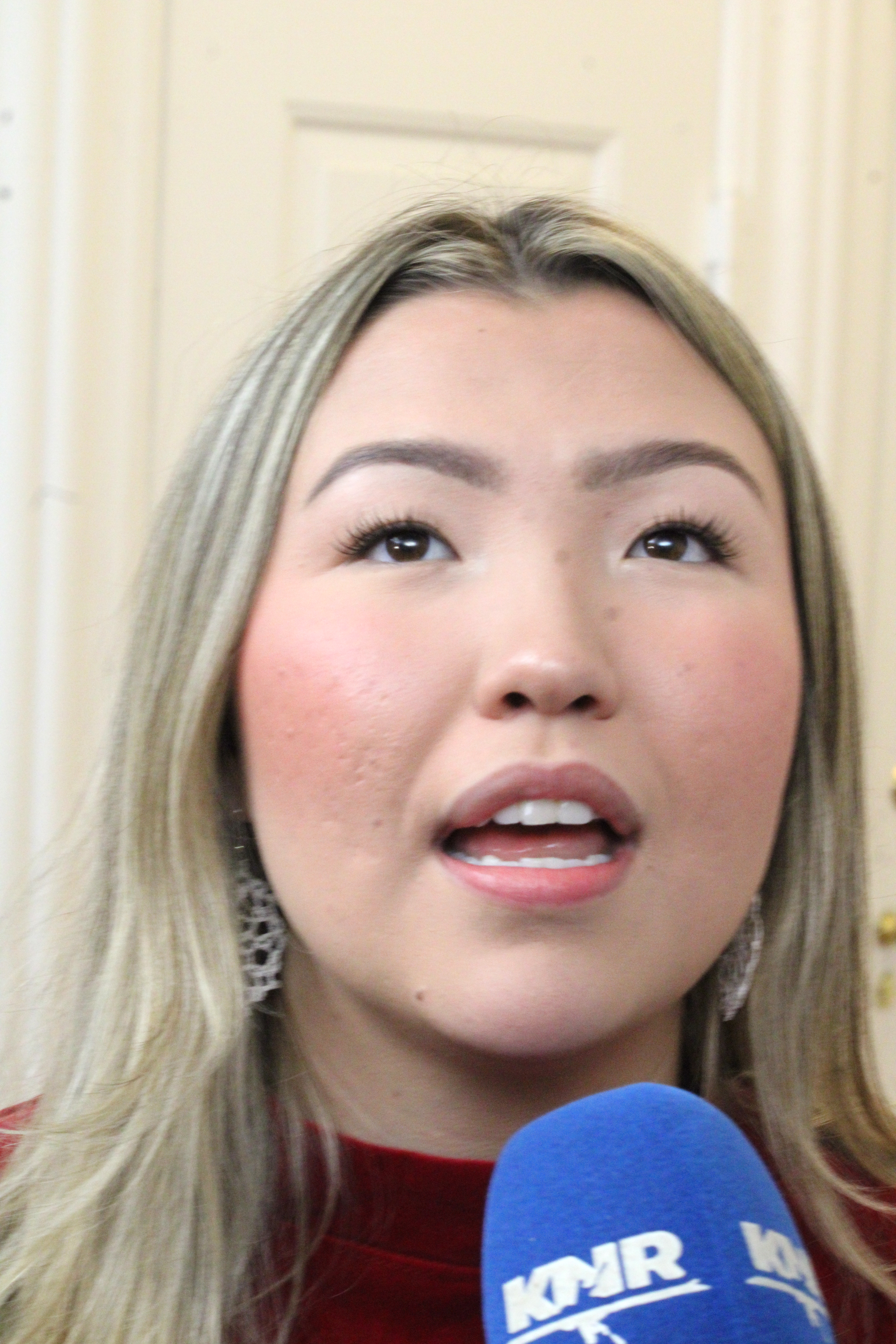
- Rosing in 2026

Member of the Inatsisartut
- Incumbent
- Assumed office 11 March 2025

Personal details
- Born: 18 April 2003 (age 22)
- Party: Inuit Ataqatigiit

Nivi Kizzie Ringsted Rosing (born 18 April 2003) is a Greenlandic politician serving as a member of the Inatsisartut since 2025. She is the youngest current member of the Inatsisartut.
