= Rasmus Berthelsen =

Greenlandic poet and artist (1827–1901)

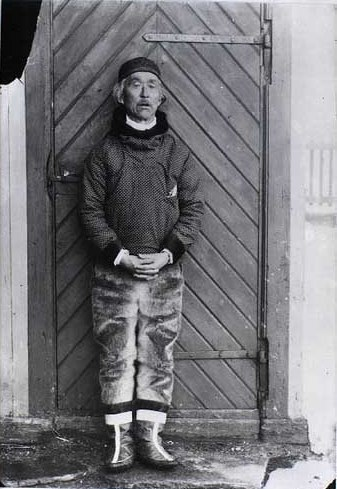
Rasmus Berthelsen

Rasmus Storm Josva Berthel Berthelsen (1827–1901) was a Greenlandic teacher, poet, and artist. He also served as an early editor for Atuagagdliutit. He is considered important to their literary history and wrote the Greenland Christmas carol Guterput or Our God. His woodcut Starving Greenlanders is seen as an early example of social commentary in Greenland art. He is perhaps best known for the hymn-writing and also poetry being seen as perhaps the first Greenlandic author, at least of the post-Viking age.
