= William R. Bertelsen =

American inventor (1920–2009)

William R. Bertelsen inventor of the Hovercraft
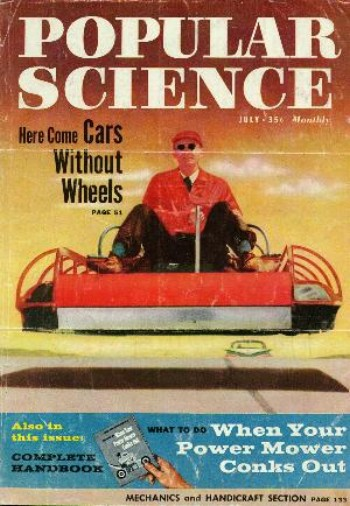
- Bertelsen on the cover of Popular Science magazine, July 1959
- Born: May 20, 1920; Moline, Illinois, US
- Died: July 16, 2009 (aged 89); Rock Island, Illinois, US
- Education: Indiana Institute of Technology; University of Illinois

William R. Bertelsen (May 20, 1920 – July 16, 2009) was an American inventor who pioneered in the field of air-cushion vehicles (hovercraft). Bertelsen was most notable for being the inventor of the Aeromobile, which is credited as the first hovercraft to carry a human over land and water. In 2002, Bertelsen was named the "Father of the Air Cushion Vehicle" by The World Hovercraft Federation. William R. Bertelsen married Alberta Menzel on September 21, 1946, in Homewood, Illinois.

He graduated from Rock Island High School in 1938 and studied mechanical engineering at the Indiana Institute of Technology for two years. Besides his busy career as a physician and inventor, Bertelsen was also a husband and father of four children. It was Bertelsen's career as a country medical doctor that primarily drove him to design and experiment with a variety of ACVs. His need for a way to reach rural patients in all forms of inclement weather quickly evolved into a life-long passion for developing alternative forms of transportation. Persisting through periods of encouragement and rejection alike, Bertelsen designed a number of ACVs and Ground Effect Machines (GEMs), including: Aeromobiles 35-1, 35-2, 72, 200-1, 200-2, 250-1; Arcopter GEM-1, GEM-2, GEM-3; and a vertical take-off and landing aircraft (VTOL). He also developed other types of air cushion applications, such as the Aeroplow, the Aeroduct System of Mass Transportation, and the Air Track Air Cushion Crawler. Additionally, Bertelsen wrote scientific papers, appeared in publications, and participated professionally in a number of domestic and international air cushion vehicles organizations, such as the U.S. Hovercraft Society, the British Hovercraft Society, and the Canadian Aeronautics and Space Institute. Experiments and tests were often a family affair, as he liked to involve family and neighbors whenever practicable.

Bertelsen never truly retired, working for the Metro MRI Center in Moline, Illinois, until March 2009. His final blog posts, only months before his death on July 16, 2009, still encouraged innovation and new ways of thinking about transportation. Several of Bertelsen's vehicles are in the collections of the National Air and Space Museum.

== In the media ==
- In July 1959, he was featured on the cover of Popular Science magazine.
- in 1996, his inventions were featured in Extreme Machines series on The Discovery Channel.
