= Polar Party =

- Leader: Nikolaj Heinrich
- Ideology: National conservatism

The Polar Party (Greenlandic: Íssigtup Partîa, Danish: Polarpartiet) was a nationalist and conservative political party in Greenland led by Nikolaj Heinrich.

== History ==
The party won a single seat in the 1987 elections, which it retained in the 1991 elections. However, it received just 90 votes in the 1995 elections; it lost its seat in Parliament.
