= Aki-Matilda Høegh-Dam =

Danish-Greenlandic politician

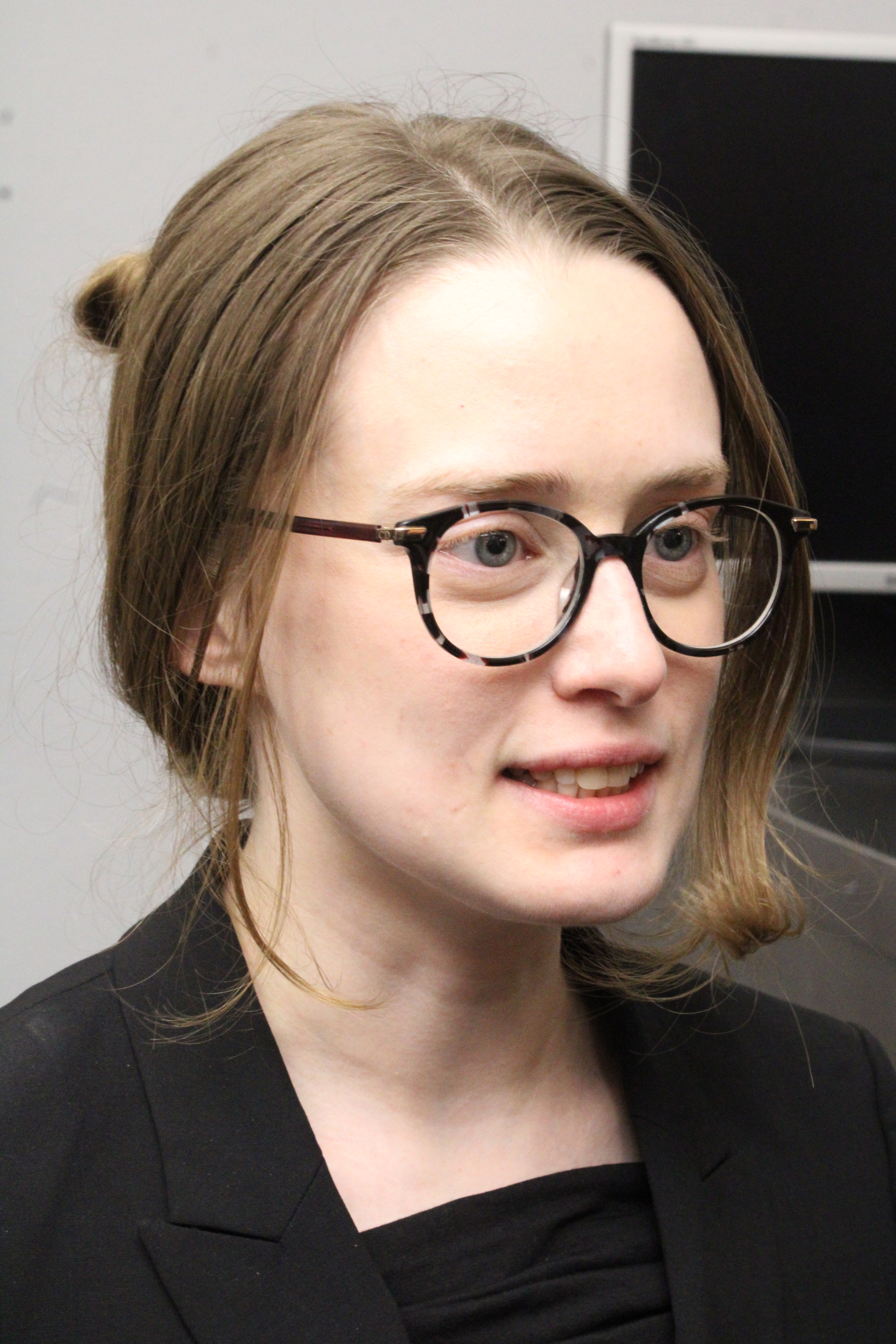
- Høegh-Dam in 2026

Member of the Inatsisartut
- Incumbent
- Assumed office March 2025
- Constituency: Sisimiut

Member of the Folketing
- In office 5 June 2019 – 24 March 2026
- Preceded by: Aleqa Hammond
- Succeeded by: Qarsoq Høegh-Dam
- Constituency: Greenland at-large

Personal details
- Born: Aki-Matilda Høegh-Dam; 17 October 1996 (age 29) Hillerød, Denmark
- Citizenship: Denmark
- Party: Naleraq (since 2025)
- Other political affiliations: Siumut (until 2025)
- Relatives: Qarsoq Høegh-Dam (brother)
- Education: University of Copenhagen

Aki-Matilda Høegh-Dam (born 17 October 1996) is a Greenlandic nationalist politician who currently serves in the Inatsisartut. She was elected to the Folketing during the 2019 Danish general election at the age of 22, becoming its youngest member. Previously a member of the centre-left Siumut, she is now a member of the centre-right Naleraq Party.

== Early life ==
Born on 17 October 1996 in Hillerød, Aki-Matilda Høegh-Dam is the daughter of Kim Høegh-Dam, a fisherman and seaman, and Bitten Høegh-Dam, a schoolteacher. The youngest child in the family, she has two brothers and two half-sisters on her father's side. She is half Danish and half Greenlandic with two Danish and two ethnically Greenlandic grandparents. She was brought up in Sisimiut on Greenland's west coast. When she was 15, as a volunteer in Nakuusa (UNICEF's project in support of Greenlandic children), she went on a trip around Greenland's coast during which she discussed politics with a friend. As a result, she decided to join Siumut, a social democratic political party. After joining the party's youth organization, her interest in politics continued to grow.

After graduating from high school, in 2014 she began studying political science at the University of Copenhagen and graduated in 2019. In 2015, she participated in the Miss Denmark competition. Although she finished in sixth place, the event did much to draw attention to her in Greenland.

== Political career ==
In the Danish general election on 5 June 2019, Høegh-Dam was one of two Greenlanders who succeeded in becoming members of the Folketing. Expressing strong support for Mette Frederiksen, head of the Social Democrats, she campaigned on the basis that Denmark should take more care of its responsibilities for Greenlanders. She also supports independence for Greenland.

During a parliamentary debate on 3 October 2024, Høegh-Dam was asked to leave the podium by Folketing speaker Søren Gade after she broke Folketing protocol by delivering an eight-minute speech in Greenlandic, rather than Danish, explaining Siumut's political position on human rights abuses including the spiral scandal: although she had distributed written translations to other legislators beforehand, convention dictates that speeches must either be given in Danish or translated into Danish immediately afterwards.

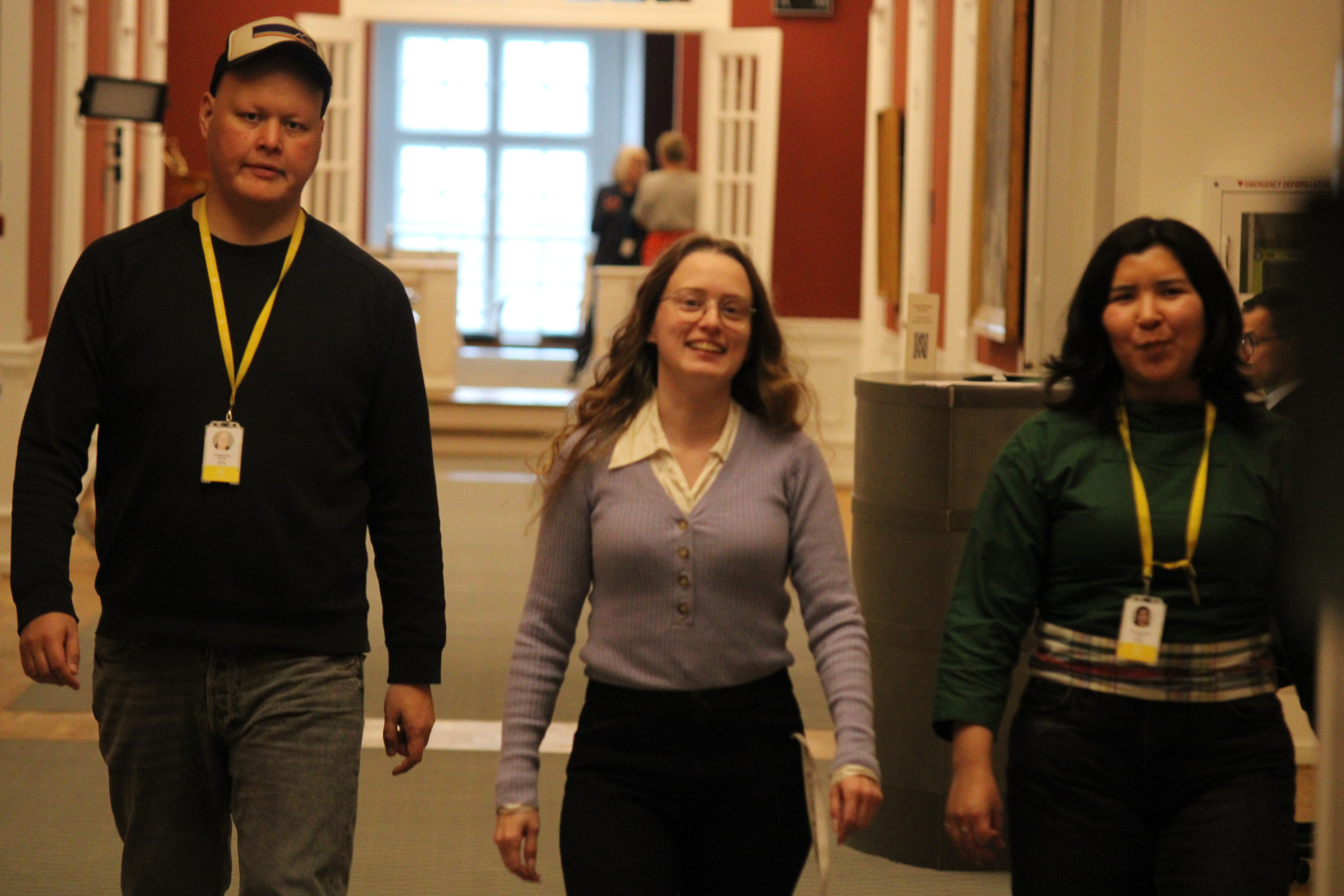
Høegh-Dam at Christiansborg Palace, 9 December 2025

On 7 February 2025, Høegh-Dam announced that she was leaving Siumut, because of her view that the leadership of Siumut and chairman Erik Jensen did not advocate for Greenlandic independence forcefully enough. She subsequently joined Naleraq on 10 February 2025 and announced she would be running for the party at the upcoming Greenlandic election. She went on to receive the third-largest number of votes for a single candidate in the cycle, and won a seat in the Inatsisartut. She did not run in the 2026 Folketing election.
