= Arctic Technology Centre =

Arctic DTU
- Type: Joint venture / Technical campus
- Established: 2000
- Affiliations: Technical University of Denmark (DTU) * KTI (Tech College Greenland)
- Location: Sisimiut, Greenland; 66.9360°N 53.6730°W
- Language: Danish, English
- Website: www.arctic.dtu.dk

The Arctic Technology Centre (ARTEK) in Sisimiut, Greenland, is jointly operated by the Technical University of Denmark (DTU) and KTI (Tech College Greenland). Its educational activities include DTU's Arctic Semester and part of the Nordic Master in Cold Climate Engineering. It is also a member of the University of the Arctic.

== International activities ==
In the later years, new and more international education opportunities have been added to the activities in Sisimiut. DTU's Arctic Semester was offered in Sisimiut for the first time in the spring of 2016, while the Nordic Master of Cold Climate Engineering was offered for the first time later the same year. Part of the Nordic Master in Cold Climate Engineering takes place in Sisimiut.

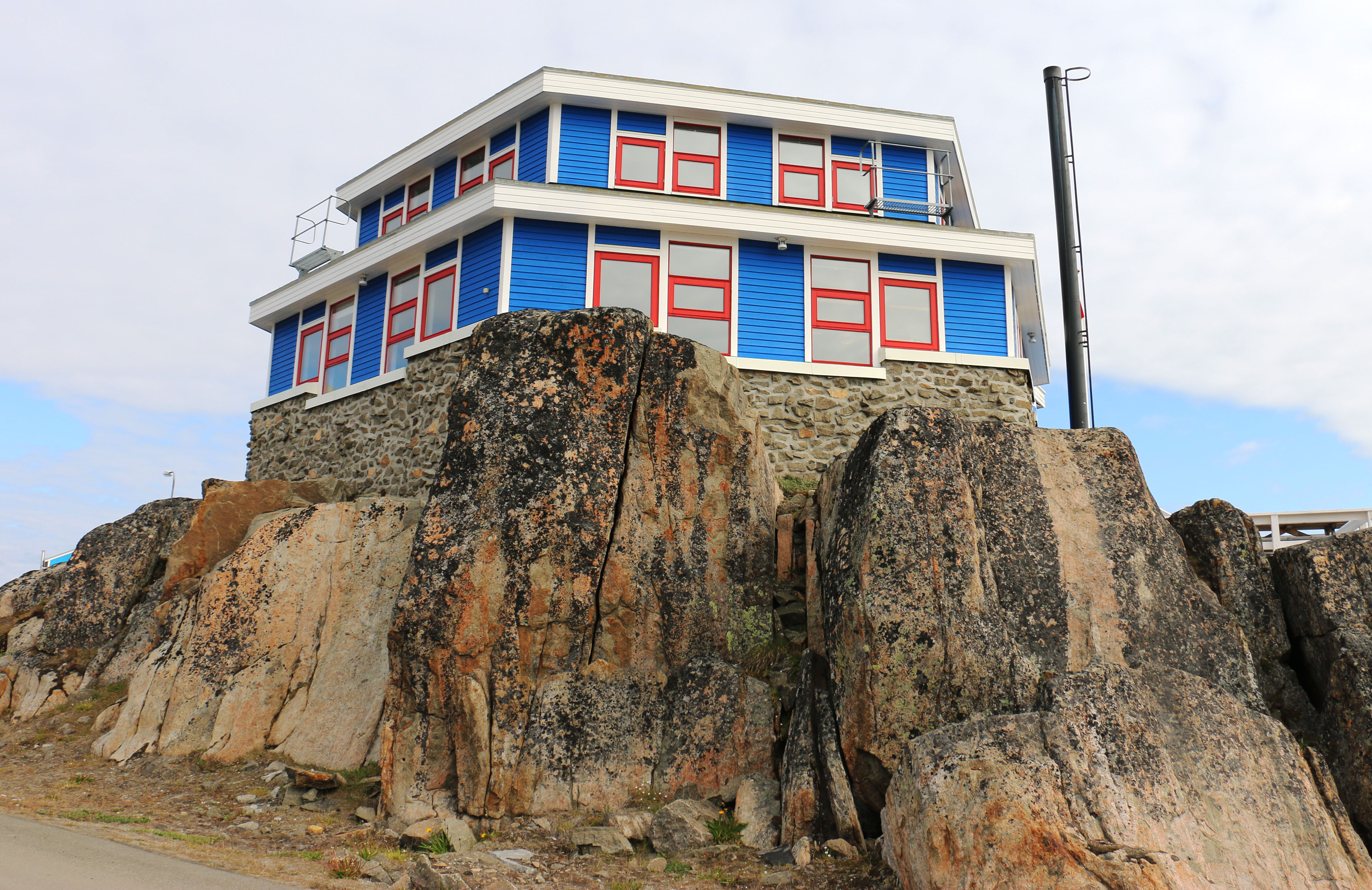
ARTEK Campus Sisimiut is DTU's campus in Sisimiut, Greenland.

The operation of ARTEK is a joint venture between KTI (Teknikimik Ilinniarfik/Tech College Greenland) in Sisimiut and DTU. ARTEK is funded by the Government of Greenland, private foundations and DTU.

ARTEK is an active member of the University of the Arctic. UArctic is an international cooperative network based in the Circumpolar Arctic region, consisting of more than 200 universities, colleges, and other organizations with an interest in promoting education and research in the Arctic region.
