= Asii Chemnitz Narup =

Greenlandic politician (born 1954)

Asii Chemnitz Narup (born 1954) is a Greenlandic politician and MP for the party Inuit Ataqatigiit. Narup was the country's environmental and health minister between 2005 and 2006. She resigned in protest against what she felt was a poorly functioning government. She was the mayor of Sermersooq until 2019.
