= Malik Berthelsen =

Greenlandic politician

Mayor of Qeqqata
- Incumbent
- Assumed office 2017
- Preceded by: Hermann Berthelsen

Member of the Inatsisartut
- In office 2009–2013

Personal details
- Citizenship: Denmark
- Party: Siumut

Malik Berthelsen is a Greenlandic politician serving as the mayor of Qeqqata, chairman of the Qeqqata municipal council, and a former member of the Parliament of Greenland, the Inatsisartut.

== Political career ==
From 2009 to 2013, Berthelsen was a member of the Inatsisartut.

In the 2017 Greenlandic local elections, Berthelsen was elected mayor of Qeqqata, succeeding Hermann Berthelsen who had previously been mayor since 1999.

Berthelsen has focused on transportation and has been a proponent of the construction of a road would connect Sisimiut to Kangerlussuaq. This would be Greenland's first ever road project linking one settlement to another.
