= Ane Hansen (politician) =

Greenlandic politician (born 1961)

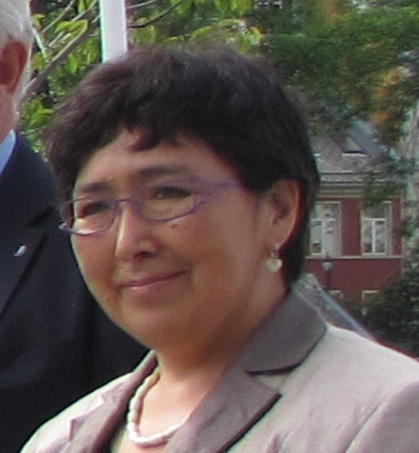
Ane Hansen at a Nordic Council of Ministers meeting in Trondheim, Norway 28 June 2012.

Ane Hansen (born 1961) is a Greenlandic politician. A member of the Inuit Ataqatigiit, she was Minister for Fisheries, Hunting and Agriculture 2009–13. She has been the mayor of Qeqertalik Municipality since the position was established on 1 January 2018.
