= Aaja Chemnitz =

Greenlandic politician (born 1977)

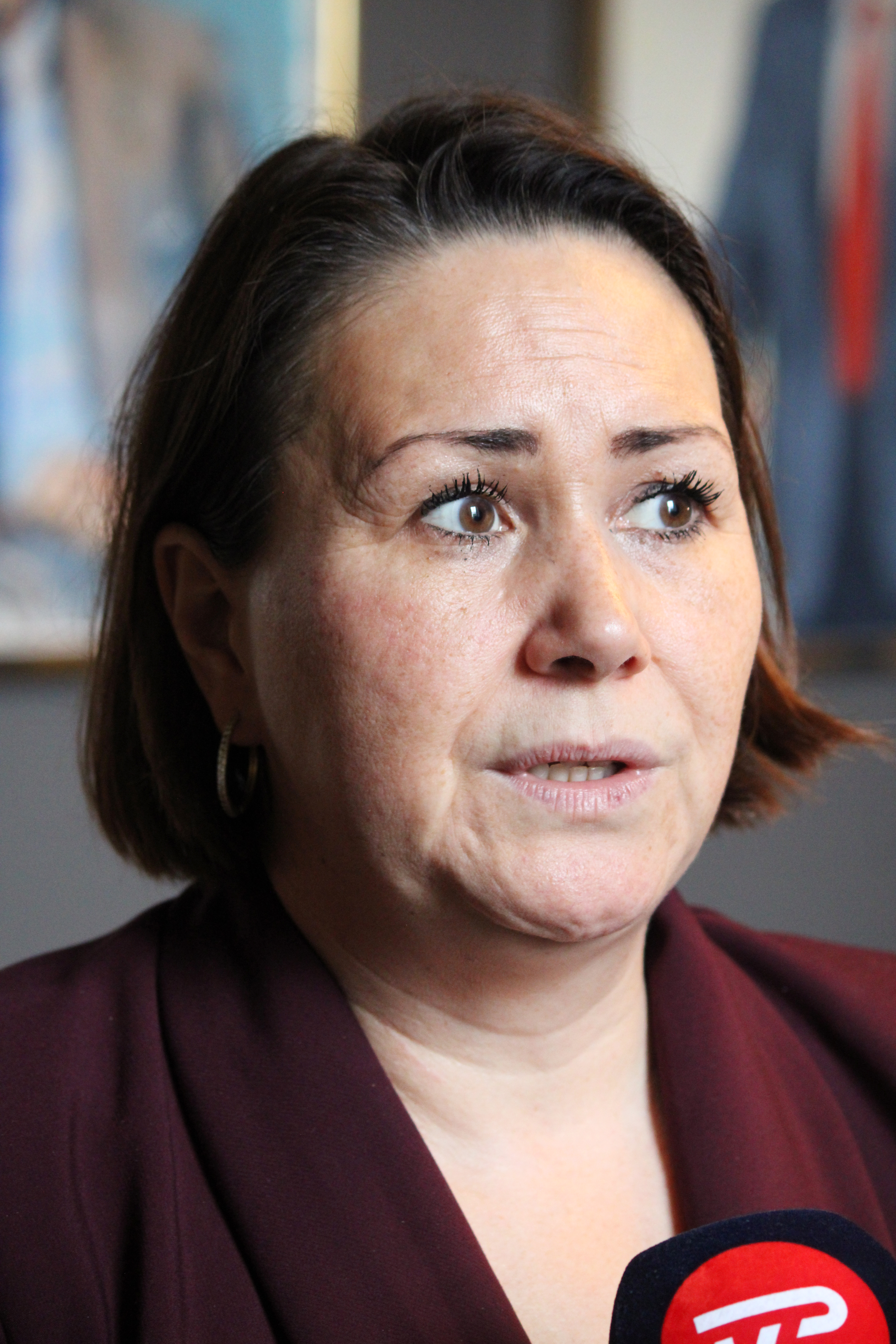
- Chemnitz in 2026

Member of the Folketing
- Incumbent
- Assumed office 18 June 2015
- Constituency: Greenland

Member of the Inatsisartut
- In office 10 December 2014 – 24 April 2018

Personal details
- Born: 2 December 1977 (age 48) Nuuk, Greenland
- Party: Inuit Ataqatigiit
- Education: University of Greenland; INSEAD
- Profession: Master of Science (MSc) in Business Economics and Auditing

Aaja Chemnitz Driefer (born 2 December 1977) is a Greenlandic politician. She is a member of the Danish Folketing (Parliament) for the Inuit Ataqatigiit (IA), representing one of the two parliamentary seats for Greenland, since first being elected in 2015. She was previously a member of the Inatsisartut (Greenlandic Parliament)

== Early life and education ==
Aaja Chemnitz was born on 2 December 1977 in Nuuk, Greenland, the daughter of Jørgen Schmidt Chemnitz and Jette Larsen. She earned an MSc in business economics and auditing at the University of Greenland and has an Executive management degree from the international business school INSEAD.

== Early career ==
In 2006 and 2007, Chemnitz was employed as an associate expert of the United Nations in New York City in the Division of Social and Economic Affairs, and here working with indigenous peoples' rights. She was head of the social department of Nuuk Kommune from 2007 until 2009. In 2009 she was appointed director of the Welfare Department in Municipality of Sermersooq. From 2012 until 2015, Chemnitz served as Greenland's inaugural Spokesperson for Children, who is head of MIO, the National Advocacy for Children's Rights in Greenland, established in 2012 by the Greenlandic Government.

== Political career ==
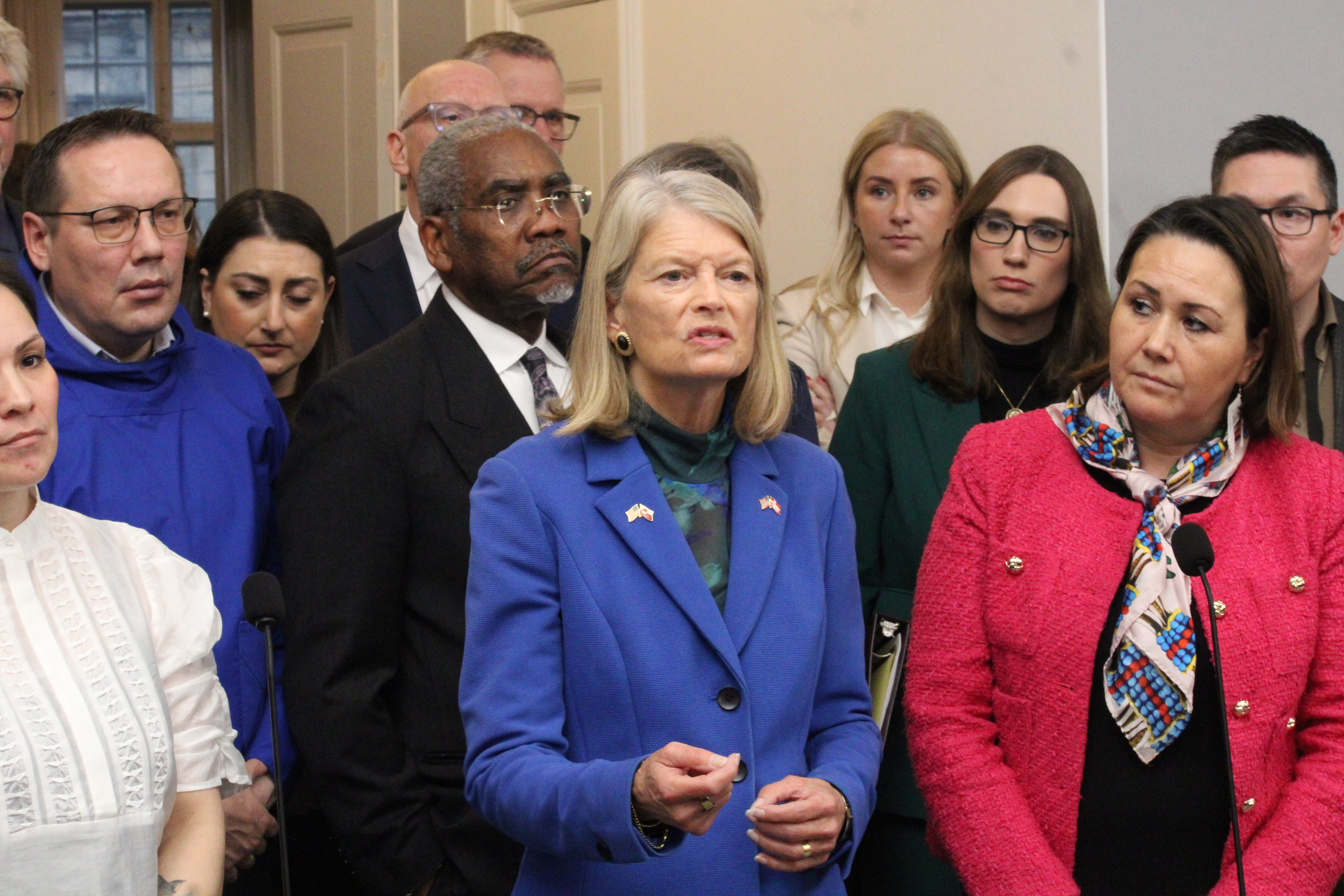
Chemnitz with U.S. Senator Lisa Murkowski at a press conference at Christiansborg in Copenhagen during the Greenland crisis, January 2026

Chemnitz was elected into the Inatsisartut at the 2014 Greenlandic general election but decided to not run again in the 2018 Greenlanding general election, having been elected into the Danish Parliament at the 2015 Danish general election. She was reelected into the Folketing in the 2019 Danish general election. In 2019, Chemnitz presented a plan focused on early prevention of sexual abuse of children, a growing problem in Greenland. The plan requested funding and support from Denmark to support efforts. The plan was approved, with Denmark agreeing to provide 80 million DKK and Greenland providing 20 million DKK to fund efforts.

=== Views ===
Chemnitz supports Greenlandic independence; however, she does not believe that independence is easy to achieve or that it would happen in the near future.

=== Appointments ===
Chemnitz' parliamentary appointments include:

- Member of Greenland's Landsting, 2014–2018
- Parliament's representative in Arctic Parliamentarians since 2015 (president from 2021)
- Vice-chair of the Greenland Committee (Grønlandsudvalget), 2017–2021
- Chair of the Greenland Committee, 2021–2022
- Vice-chair of the Greenland Committee, 2023–2024
- Vice-chair of the Danish Parliament's Arctic Delegation, 2023–2024
- Chair of the Greenland Committee since 2024

== Personal life ==
Chemnitz married Michael Driefer. She has known Greenlandic Prime Minister Jens-Frederik Nielsen since he was a child, and admires his leadership.
