= Hermann Berthelsen =

Greenlandic politician

Mayor of Sisimiut
- Incumbent
- Assumed office 2010

Mayor of Qeqqata
- In office 1999–2018
- Succeeded by: Malik Berthelsen

Personal details
- Born: Sisimiut, Qeqqata, Greenland
- Citizenship: Kingdom of Denmark
- Party: Siumut
- Occupation: Politician

Hermann Berthelsen is a Greenlandic politician and affiliated with the Siumut party. As of July 2010, Berthelsen is the mayor of Sisimiut, a town in central-western Greenland, and the administrative center of the Qeqqata municipality.
