= Luciano Soprani =

Italian fashion designer

- Born: 1946; Reggiolo, Italy
- Died: 23 October 1999 (aged 52–53); Milan
- Occupation: Fashion designer
- Label: Luciano Soprani S.r.l.
- Children: Lorenzo
- Website: http://www.lucianosoprani.it

Luciano Soprani (1946 – 23 October 1999) was an Italian fashion designer known for his tailored, colourful men's suits and silk evening gowns.

== Early life ==
Soprani was born in Reggiolo in 1946 to a family of farmers in the province of Reggio Emilia. After studying agriculture, he decided that he was more interested in fashion, and in 1967 he joined the local firm of Max Mara in Reggio Emilia. He stayed there for nearly eight years, before moving to Milan in 1974. As a freelancer, he worked with labels such as Heliette, Basile, Nazareno, Gabrielli and Gucci.

== Business ==
In 1982 he set up his own label, while continuing to work for other houses such as Gucci. He was also a wardrobe designer for the 1990 film Wild Orchid.

In 1992 Soprani fell out with his Japanese business partner, Onward Kashiyama Co., Ltd., who owned 70% of Luciano Soprani SpA. Soprani dissociated himself from the company, whilst seeking to regain use of the trademark.

Soprani died of throat cancer in a hospital in Milan, on 23 October 1999.

His friend Dilio Ortigoza succeeded him as designer at the company, to be followed by Alessandro Turci in 2002. Studio Soprani was acquired by the perfume company Satinine S.p.a., and renamed Luciano Soprani S.r.l. in January 2006.
