= Aqqalu C. Jerimiassen =

Greenlandic politician (born 1986)

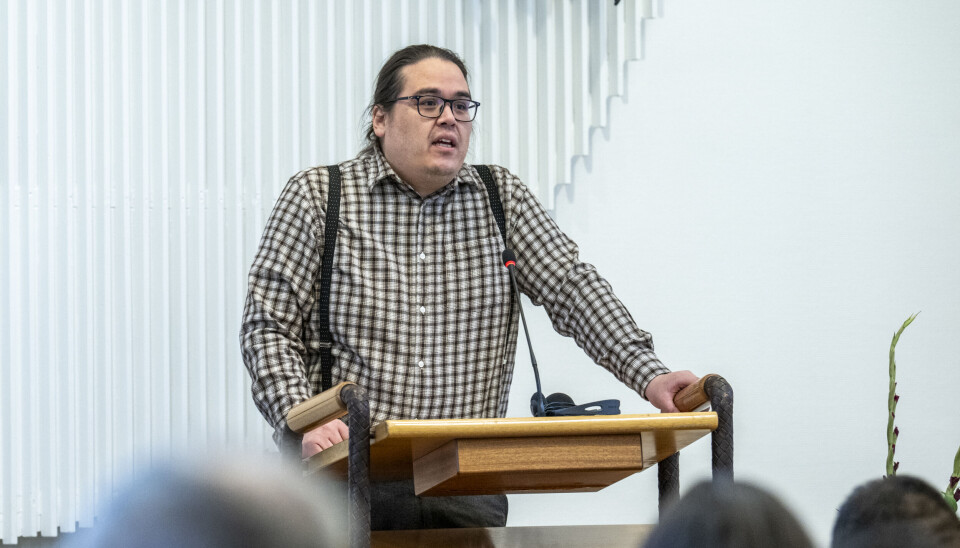
- Jerimiassen in 2024

Member of the Inatsisartut
- Incumbent
- Assumed office 24 April 2018

Personal details
- Born: 24 July 1986 (age 39)
- Party: Atassut

Aqqalu Clasen Jerimiassen (born 24 July 1986) is a Greenlandic politician serving as a member of the Inatsisartut since 2018. He has served as chairman of Atassut since 2019. From 2018 to 2019, he served as minister of industry, trade, and energy.
