= Pele Broberg =

Greenlandic politician, pilot and entrepreneur (born 1972)

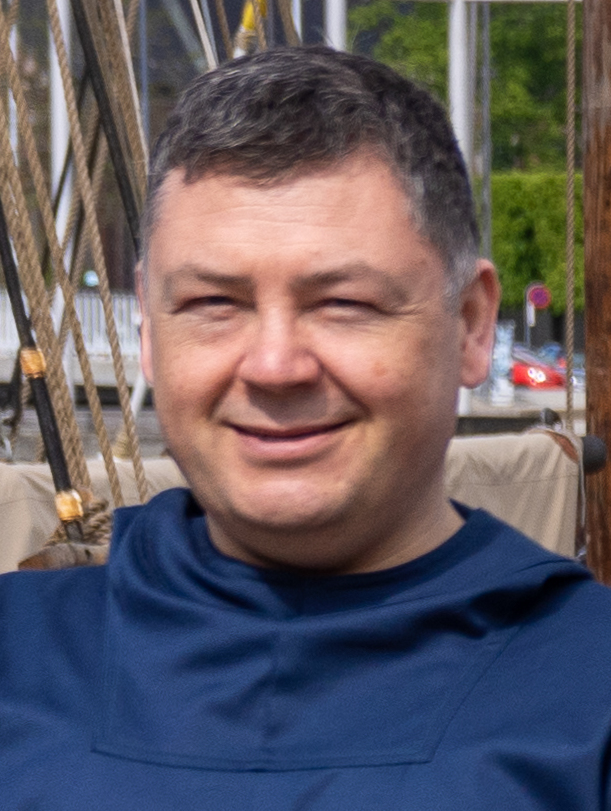
- Broberg in 2021

Chairman of Naleraq
- Incumbent
- Assumed office 25 June 2022
- Preceded by: Hans Enoksen

Minister for Business and Trade
- In office 27 September 2021 – 4 April 2022
- Prime Minister: Múte Bourup Egede
- Preceded by: Himself
- Succeeded by: Vivian Motzfeldt

Minister for Foreign Affairs, Trade, Climate and Business
- In office 23 April 2021 – 27 September 2021
- Prime Minister: Múte Bourup Egede
- Preceded by: Kim Kielsen (Foreign affairs); Vittus Qujaukitsoq (Business)
- Succeeded by: Himself (Trade and Business); Múte Bourup Egede (Foreign Affairs and Climate)

Minister for Finance
- In office 15 May 2018 – 10 September 2018
- Prime Minister: Kim Kielsen
- Preceded by: Aqqaluaq B. Egede
- Succeeded by: Vittus Qujaukitsoq

Member of Inatsisartut
- Incumbent
- Assumed office 24 April 2018

Personal details
- Born: 3 November 1972 (age 53) Copenhagen, Denmark
- Citizenship: Kingdom of Denmark
- Party: Naleraq
- Spouse: Malene Broberg
- Children: 2
- Education: Copenhagen Business School

Pele Broberg (born 3 November 1972) is a Greenlandic politician, entrepreneur, and pilot who has been chairman of the nationalist political party Naleraq since 2022. He previously served as Minister for Foreign Affairs, Trade, Climate, and Business in 2021, though the foreign affairs and climate portfolios were reassigned to Premier Múte Bourup Egede in September of that year following a controversy. Broberg also served as Minister for Finance in 2018.

== Biography ==
Broberg was born in Copenhagen in 1972. His family moved to Greenland while he was an infant and he grew up in Qeqertarsuaq.

Broberg graduated from High School in Aasiaat in 1992 and trained as a pilot at SAS Flight Academy in 1995. He then worked as a pilot at Air Greenland 1995–1997 and at Aviation Assistance 1997–1998. From 1999 to 2014 Broberg was captain at Air Greenland. In February 2018, he became a clerk in the Department of Trade and Business, but is on leave while he is minister.

Broberg graduated with a degree in business administration from the Copenhagen Business School in the 2010s.

Broberg is also an entrepreneur and businessman. From 2006 to 2013 he owned the company Barista ApS, from 2015 to 2016 he owned Aluu Airlines A/S. He has served on several company boards.

== Political career ==
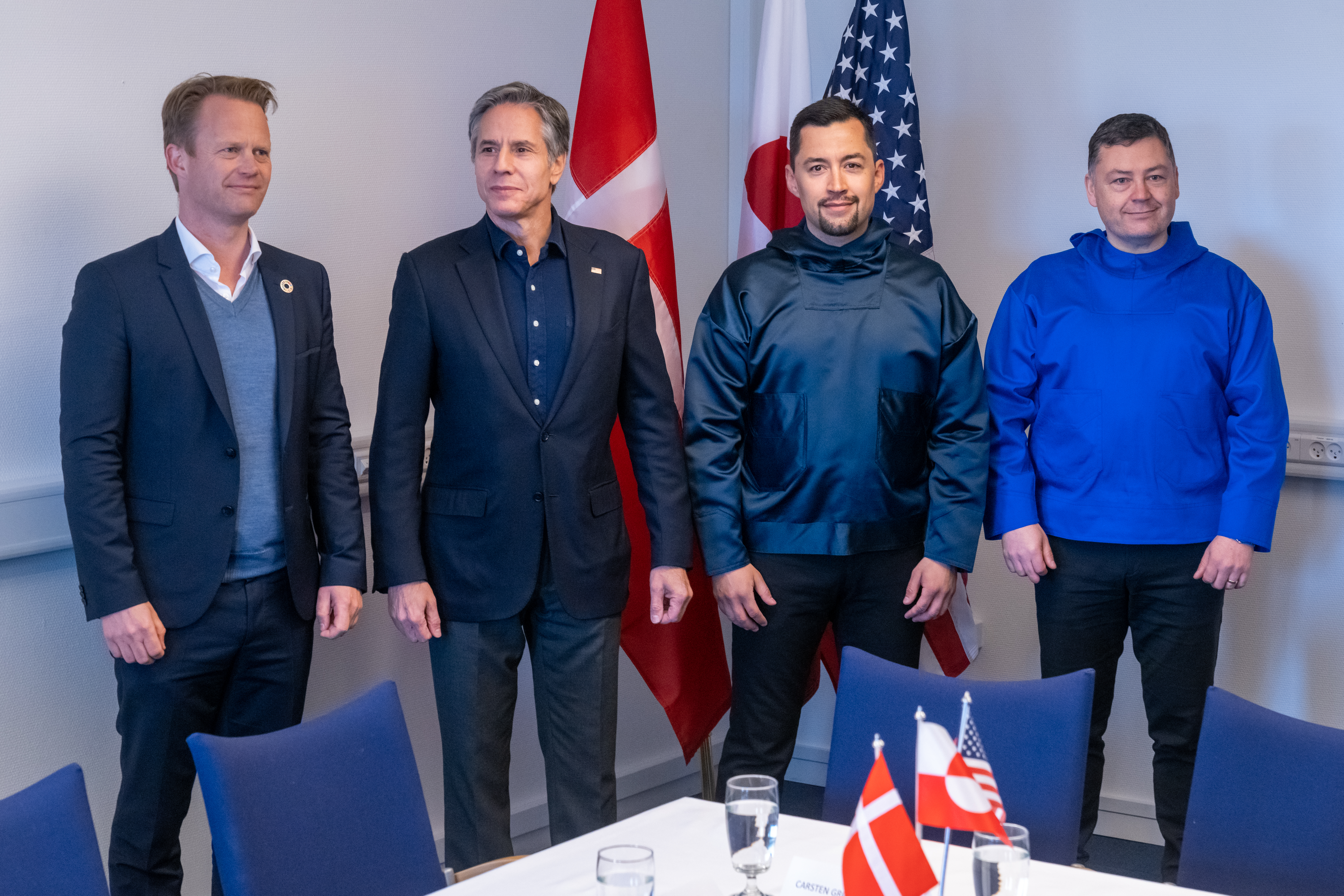
Broberg (far right) meeting with (from left to right) Danish Minister of Foreign Affairs Jeppe Kofod, US Secretary of State Antony Blinken and Premier Múte Bourup Egede in Kangerlussuaq 20 May 2021

Broberg was not politically active until he ran for the Inatsisartut election in 2018. He was elected with 208 votes, the second most votes for Naleraq after party founder Hans Enoksen, and became minister for finance in a coalition government with Siumut, Naleraq, Atassut and Nunatta Qitornai. As minister for finance, Broberg proposed halving the corporation tax in Greenland. Naleraq resigned from the governing coalition on 10 September 2018, and Broberg was replaced by Vittus Qujaukitsoq (Nunatta Qitornai) as minister for finance.

At the 2019 Danish general election Broberg ran for Naleraq and got 863 votes without being elected. Broberg had leave from Inatsisartut during the parliamentary election campaign.

In 2021, Broberg ran in both the Inatsisartut election and municipal election, and he was re-elected to Inatsisartut and elected to the municipal council in Sermersooq Municipality. After the election, he became minister for foreign affairs, trade, climate and business in the First Egede cabinet.

19 September 2021, the Danish newspaper Berlingske ran an interview with Broberg, where he stated that the word "Rigsfællesskabet" (Danish: The unity of the Realm) should be abolished because it pretends that Greenland and the Faroe Islands are on an equal footing with Denmark, which according to Broberg is not the case as he believes that it is a Danish supremacy. Broberg prefers the term "det danske rige" (Danish: The Danish realm) instead. He also stated that it should be discussed whether only Greenlanders with Inuit background should be able to vote in a possible upcoming referendum on Greenlandic independence. Premier of Greenland Múte Bourup Egede distanced himself from his minister's statements in a press release, and the opposition parties Siumut and Demokraatit also opposed dividing the population into groups with different rights. The chairman of Demokraatit Jens-Frederik Nielsen thought that such policies were reminiscent of the former Soviet Union. The support party Atassut also criticized Broberg and expressed their distrust of him as minister. On 27 September, Múte Bourup Egede took over the foreign affairs and climate areas from Broberg. He was later elected as Chairman of Naleraq on 25 June 2022 at an extraordinary congress, following the resignation of party founder Hans Enoksen.

== Family ==
Broberg is married to Malene Broberg. The couple has two children. Malene Broberg is the chief accountant of Pisiffik and ran for Naleraq in the 2018 general election.
