= Naleraq =

Political party in Greenland

- Leader: Pele Broberg
- Founder: Hans Enoksen
- Founded: 8 March 2014
- Split from: Siumut
- Headquarters: Nuuk
- Youth wing: Naleqqat
- Ideology: Populism; Greenlandic independence Greenlandic nationalism
- Political position: Centre to centre-right
- Colours: Orange
- Inatsisartut: 8 / 31
- Municipalities: 9 / 81
- Folketing (Greenland seats): 1 / 2

Website
- naleraq.gl

Naleraq (lit. 'Point of Orientation'), previously known as Partii Naleraq, is a centrist-populist and nationalist political party in Greenland. While parties such as Inuit Ataqatigiit and Siumut also favor Greenlandic independence, Naleraq is seen as advocating for more immediate independence, and promised in the lead-up to the 2025 election to hold a referendum on the issue.

== History ==
In January 2014, Hans Enoksen announced that he was forming a new political party after leaving Siumut. In the 2014 Greenlandic general election, the party won three seats, taken by Enoksen, Per Rosing-Petersen (another former Siumut member) and Anthon Frederiksen (a former Association of Candidates member). In the 2018 Greenlandic general election, the party increased its vote share and won four seats in parliament. In May 2018, MP Henrik Fleischer left the party and switched to Siumut.

On 15 February 2021, the party changed its name and logo. In June 2022, Hans Enoksen resigned as party chairman, and was replaced by Pele Broberg. On 10 February 2025, Folketing member Aki-Matilda Høegh-Dam departed Siumut and joined Naleraq, saying that Siumut was insufficiently committed to Greenlandic independence. At the 2025 Greenlandic general election, Naleraq finished a surprising second, winning eight seats, double their previous total.

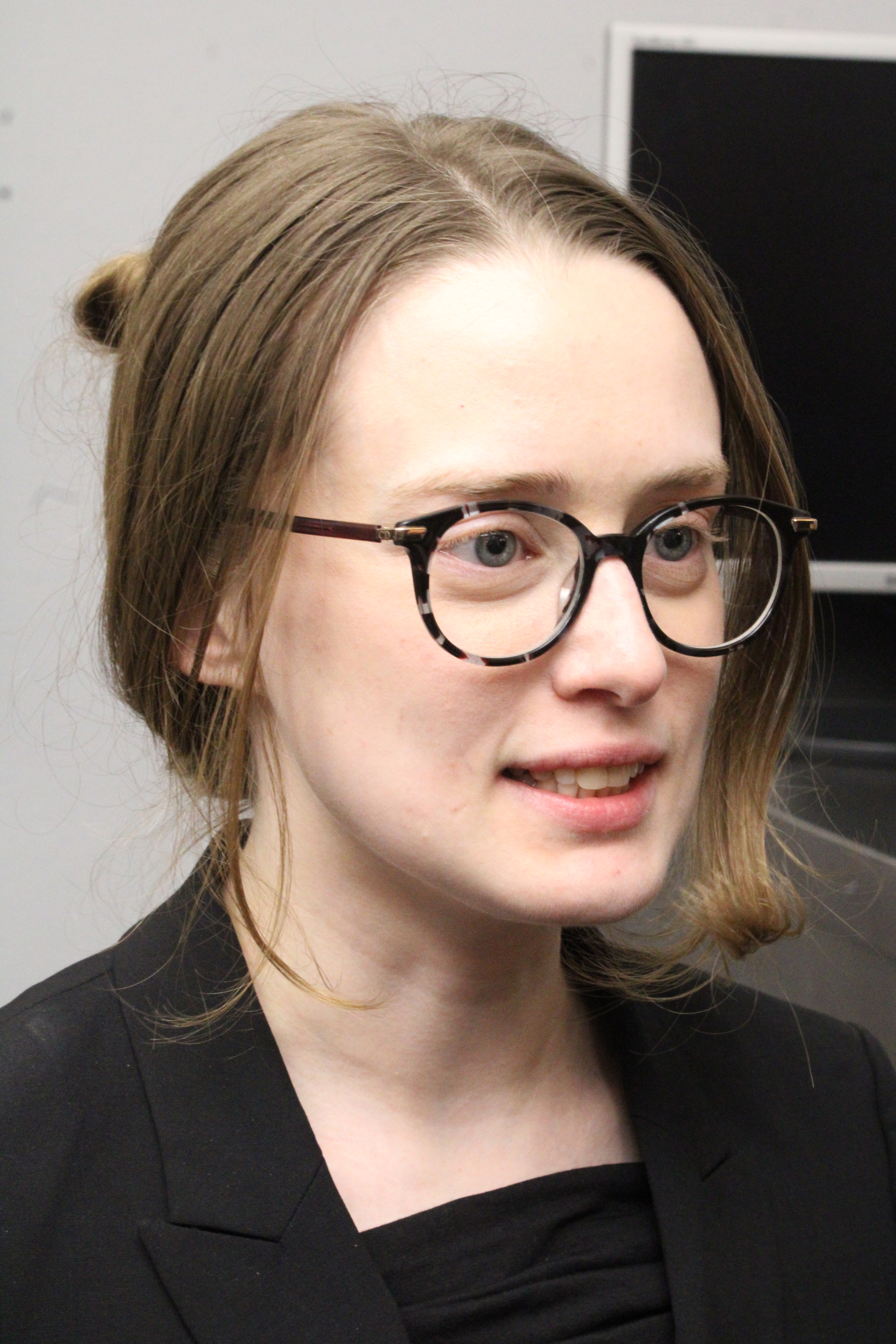
Aki-Matilda Høegh-Dam, member of Naleraq since 2025

The party currently holds one of Greenland's two seats in the Folketing, represented by Aki-Matilda Høegh-Dam.

== Election results ==
=== Inatsisartut ===
Election	Votes	%	Seats	+/–	Position	Status
2014	3,423	11.6	3 / 31	New	▲4th	Opposition (2014–2016)
2014	3,423	11.6	3 / 31	New	▲4th	Coalition (2016–2018)
2018	3,931	13.4	4 / 31	▲1	4th	Coalition (2018)
2018	3,931	13.4	4 / 31	▲1	4th	Opposition (2018–2021)
2021	3,252	12.3	4 / 31	Steady	▲3rd	Coalition (2021–2022)
2021	3,252	12.3	4 / 31	Steady	▲3rd	Opposition (2022–2025)
2025	7,009	24.8	8 / 31	▲4	▲2nd	Opposition

=== Folketing ===
Election	Greenland				
Election	Votes	%	Seats	+/–	Position
2015	962	4.7	0 / 2	New	▲5th
2019	1,565	7.6	0 / 2	Steady	5th
2022	2,416	12.6	0 / 2	Steady	▲4th
2026	5,268	25.1	1 / 2	▲1	▲2nd

== See also ==
- List of political parties in Greenland
