= List of members of the Inatsisartut, 2013–2014 =

This is a list of the 31 members of the Parliament of Greenland, who were elected members of parliament of Greenland following the 2013 parliamentary elections until the 2014 parliamentary elections.

== List ==
Name	National party	Constituency	Votes
Maliina Abelsen	Inuit Ataqatigiit	Nuuk	1,334
Hans Aronsen	Inuit Ataqatigiit	Kangaatsiaq	125
Randi Broberg	Inuit Party	Nuuk	211
Palle Christiansen	Democrats	Nuuk	272
Aqqaluaq Egede	Inuit Ataqatigiit	Nuuk	560
Hans Enoksen	Siumut	Kullorsuaq	623
Agathe Fontain	Inuit Ataqatigiit	Sisimiut	121
Evelyn Frederiksen	Siumut	Sisimiut	139
Jens Frederiksen	Democrats	Nuuk	513
Aleqa Hammond	Siumut	Nuuk	6,818
Jens Imanuelsen	Siumut	Upernavik	174
Ane Hansen	Inuit Ataqatigiit	Aasiaat	286
Juliane Henningsen	Inuit Ataqatigiit	Nuuk	207
Siverth Heilmann	Solidarity	Maniitsoq	293
Doris Jakobsen	Siumut	Nuuk	234
Kristian Jeremiassen	Siumut	Qasigiannguit	206
Nikolaj Jeremiassen	Siumut	Niaqornaarsuk	176
Lars Emil Johansen	Siumut	Nuuk	400
Finn Karlsen	Siumut	Nuuk	175
Mimi Karlsen	Inuit Ataqatigiit	Nuuk	113
Kim Kielsen	Siumut	Paamiut	393
Jens-Erik Kirkegaard	Siumut	Nuuk	156
Kuupik Kleist	Inuit Ataqatigiit	Nuuk	4,369
Karl-Kristian Kruse	Siumut	Niaqornat	216
Kalistat Lund	Inuit Ataqatigiit	Narsaq	168
Karl Lyberth	Siumut	Maniitsoq	264
Steen Lynge	Solidarity	Nuuk	331
Naaja Nathanielsen	Inuit Ataqatigiit	Nuuk	155
Nikku Olsen	Inuit Party	Nuuk	1,116
Sara Olsvig	Inuit Ataqatigiit	Nuuk	1,030
Vittus Qujaukitsoq	Siumut	Nuuk	205
