= Same-sex marriage in Greenland =

Same-sex marriage has been legal in Greenland since 1 April 2016. Same-sex marriage legislation passed the Inatsisartut by a unanimous 27–0 vote on 26 May 2015. The law was originally planned to come into effect on 1 October, but was delayed due to the 2015 parliamentary elections. Approval by the Folketing followed on 19 January 2016, and the law received royal assent on 3 February. It took effect on 1 April, with the first same-sex marriage in Greenland taking place that day in Nuuk.

From 1996 to 2016, Greenland, an autonomous territory within the Kingdom of Denmark, recognised registered partnerships for same-sex couples, providing most, but not all, of the rights and benefits of marriage. The ability to enter into a partnership was closed off following the legalization of same-sex marriage.

== Registered partnerships ==
Denmark's registered partnership law had been in operation since 1 October 1989. A bill to expand its application to Greenland was approved by the Inatsisartut on 14 May 1993 by a vote of 15–0 with 12 abstentions, and by the Folketing on 28 March 1996 by a vote of 104–1. The bill was given royal assent on 26 April 1996, and took effect on 1 July 1996. Jesper Kunuk Egede, an advocate who worked for LGBT Qaamaneq, later wrote that "the debate in the Inatsisartut was short and sober. Most members voiced their support for the proposal, but there were some critical voices. But even they did not vote against the proposal in the end. Subsequently there was some debate in the Greenlandic press, but there seemed to be a consensus that a law on registered partnership was a good thing." The law gave registered partners nearly identical rights to married couples, with the following three exceptions: joint adoption of children; laws making explicit reference to the sexes of a married couple did not apply to registered partnerships; and regulations by international treaties did not apply unless all signatories agreed.

The first same-sex couple registered in 2002. Registered partnerships are called nalunaarsukkamik inooqatigiinneq (pronounced [nalʉnaːsːukːamik inɔːqatsiɣiːnːɜq]) in Greenlandic, and registreret partnerskab (pronounced [ʁekiˈstʁeˀð̩ ˈpʰɑːtnɐˌskɛˀp]) in Danish. The law was repealed on 1 April 2016, and the ability to enter into a registered partnership was closed off on that date. Registered partners may retain their status or convert their union into a recognized marriage.

== Same-sex marriage ==
=== Legislative action ===
A resolution, expressing the Naalakkersuisut's wish to opt in the current version of Denmark's marriage law, had its first reading in the Inatsisartut on 25 March 2015. The measure had been introduced by MP Justus Hansen from the Democrats party. It was approved unanimously 27–0 on second and final reading on 26 May 2015. The GlobalGayz website wrote in response to the passage of the same-sex marriage legislation that: "The fire storms of opposition seen in Paris, Berlin and Washington were totally absent before and during the short legislative procedure. Greenland's gay marriage emerged within a liberal society as naturally as the seasons change. The issue was human equality among the small population of less than 60,000 citizens in the country."

Approval by the Folketing was required before the law could go into effect, however. A bill was submitted to the Folketing on 28 January 2015 and had its first reading on 26 May 2015. It was planned to come into effect on 1 October 2015; however, it lapsed due to the 2015 parliamentary elections. A nearly identical bill with only minor formal changes was submitted on 29 October and had its first reading on 5 November. The second reading occurred on 14 January 2016, and the bill was approved 108–0 in its final reading on 19 January. The bill was given royal assent by Queen Margrethe II on 3 February, and took effect on 1 April 2016. The first same-sex marriage in Greenland was performed on 1 April at the Hans Egede Church in Nuuk between Laila Mølgaard and Henriette Simonsen.

Article 1 of the Marriage Act (Danish: Ægteskabsloven; Greenlandic: Aappariinneq pillugu inatsit) now reads as follows:

- in Danish: Loven finder anvendelse på ægteskab mellem to personer af forskelligt køn og mellem to personer af samme køn.
- in Greenlandic: Inatsit atuuppoq inunnut marlunnut assigiinngitsunik suiaassuseqartunut aamma inunnut marlunnut assigiimmik suiaassuseqartunut aappariilersunut.

(The law applies to marriages between two persons of different sex and between two persons of the same sex.)

26 May 2015 vote in the Inatsisartut
Party	Voted for	Voted against	Abstained	Absent (Did not vote)
G Siumut	9: Suka K. Frederiksen; Jens Imanuelsen; Nikolaj Jeremiassen; Lars-Emil Johansen; Ineqi Kielsen; Kim Kielsen; Jens-Erik Kirkegaard; Anders Olsen; Laura Tàunâjik	–	1: Vivian Motzfeldt	1: Jess Svane
Inuit Ataqatigiit	9: Agathe Fontain; Ane Hansen; Juliane Henningsen; Mimi Karlsen; Aaja Chemnitz; Kalistat Lund; Naaja H. Nathanielsen; Peter Olsen; Sara Olsvig	–	1: Iddimanngiiu Bianco	1: Aqqaluaq B. Egede
G Demokraatit	4: Randi Vestergaard Evaldsen; Justus Hansen; Tillie Martinussen; Michael N. Rosing	–	–	–
Partii Naleraq	3: Hans Enoksen; Anthon Frederiksen; Per Rosing-Petersen	–	–	–
G Atassut	2: Siverth Karl Heilmann; Steen Lynge	–	–	–
Total	27	0	2	2
Total	87.1%	0.0%	6.5%	6.5%

=== Religious performance ===
The Church of Greenland campaigned in favor of same-sex marriage legislation and worked closely with the government to ensure that same-sex couples would be able to have religious wedding ceremonies in the church. The Bishop of Greenland, Sofie Petersen, welcomed the legalization of same-sex marriage.

== See also ==
- LGBT rights in Greenland
- Same-sex marriage in Denmark
- Same-sex marriage in the Faroe Islands
- Recognition of same-sex unions in the Americas
- Legal status of same-sex marriage
