= List of members of the Inatsisartut, 2009–2013 =

This is a list of the members of the Parliament of Greenland in the 2009 to 2013 session.

== List ==
Name	National party	Constituency	# of votes
Maliina Abelsen	Community of the People	Nuuk	1,410
Hans Aronsen	Community of the People	Kangaatsiaq	125
Malik Berthelsen	Forward		225
Olga P. Berthelsen	Community of the People	Nuuk	126
Per Berthelsen	Forward	Nuuk	160
Harald Bianco	Community of the People	Tasiilaq	184
Palle Christiansen	Democrats	Nuuk	396
Aqqaluaq B. Egede	Community of the People	Nuuk	325
Hans Enoksen	Forward	Kullorsuaq	1,413
Agathe Fontain	Community of the People	Sisimiut	200
Anthon Frederiksen	Association of Candidates	Ilulissat	707
Jens B. Frederiksen	Democrats	Nuuk	1,050
Aleqa Hammond	Forward	Nuuk	1,488
Ane Hansen	Community of the People	Aasiaat	388
Ruth Heilmann	Forward	Maniitsoq	142
Siverth Heilmann	Solidarity	Maniitsoq	215
Juliane Henningsen	Community of the People	Nuuk	1,346
Doris Jakobsen	Forward	Nuuk	370
Kristian Jeremiassen	Forward	Qasigiannguit	154
Finn Karlsen	Solidarity	Nuuk	684
Mimi Karlsen	Community of the People	Nuuk	129
Kim Kielsen	Forward	Paamiut	300
Kuupik Kleist	Community of the People	Nuuk	5,461
Knud Kristiansen	Solidarity	Upernavik	169
Storm Ludvigsen	Community of the People		111
Karl Lyberth	Forward	Maniitsoq	154
Josef Motzfeldt	Community of the People		155
Naaja H. Nathanielsen	Community of the People	Nuuk	176
Akitsinnguaq Olsen	Community of the People		112
Astrid F. Rex	Democrats	Nuuk	114
Niels Thomsen	Democrats		762
