= List of members of the Inatsisartut, 2014–2018 =

This is a list of the current members of the Greenlandic Parliament (Inatsisartut), as of 11 January 2018.

== List ==
Name	Political Affiliation	Party in Gov't?
Aaja Chemnitz	Inuit Ataqatigiit	Yes
Anders Olsen	Siumut	Yes
Anthon Frederiksen	Partii Naleraq	Yes
Aqqaluaq B. Egede	Inuit Ataqatigiit	Yes
Bendt B. Kristiansen	Inuit Ataqatigiit	Yes
Debora Kleist	Inuit Ataqatigiit	Yes
Hans Aronsen	Inuit Ataqatigiit	Yes
Henrik Fleischer	Partii Naleraq	Yes
Ineqi Kielsen	Siumut	Yes
Jens Immanuelsen	Siumut	Yes
Jens-Erik Kirkegaard	Siumut	Yes
Jess Svane	Siumut	Yes
Justus Hansen	Democrats	No
Kelly Berthelsen	Inuit Ataqatigiit	Yes
Kim Kielsen	Siumut	Yes
Knud Kristiansen	Siumut	Yes
Lars-Emil Johansen	Siumut	Yes
Laura Tàunâjik	Siumut	Yes
Múte Bourup Egede	Inuit Ataqatigiit	Yes
Mala Høy Kuko	Siumut	Yes
Martha Lund Olsen	Siumut	Yes
Michael Rosing	Cooperation Party	No
Mimi Karlsen	Inuit Ataqatigiit	Yes
Nikkulaat Jeremiassen	Siumut	Yes
Nivi Olsen	Democrats	No
Per Rosing-Petersen	Partii Naleraq	Yes
Peter Olsen	Inuit Ataqatigiit	Yes
Randi Vestergaard Evaldsen	Democrats	No
Sara Olsvig	Inuit Ataqatigiit	Yes
Villy Olsvig	Inuit Ataqatigiit	Yes
Vivian Motzfeldt	Siumut	Yes
