= Nielsen cabinet =

Current government of Greenland

Nielsen's Cabinet
- 23rd Cabinet of Greenland

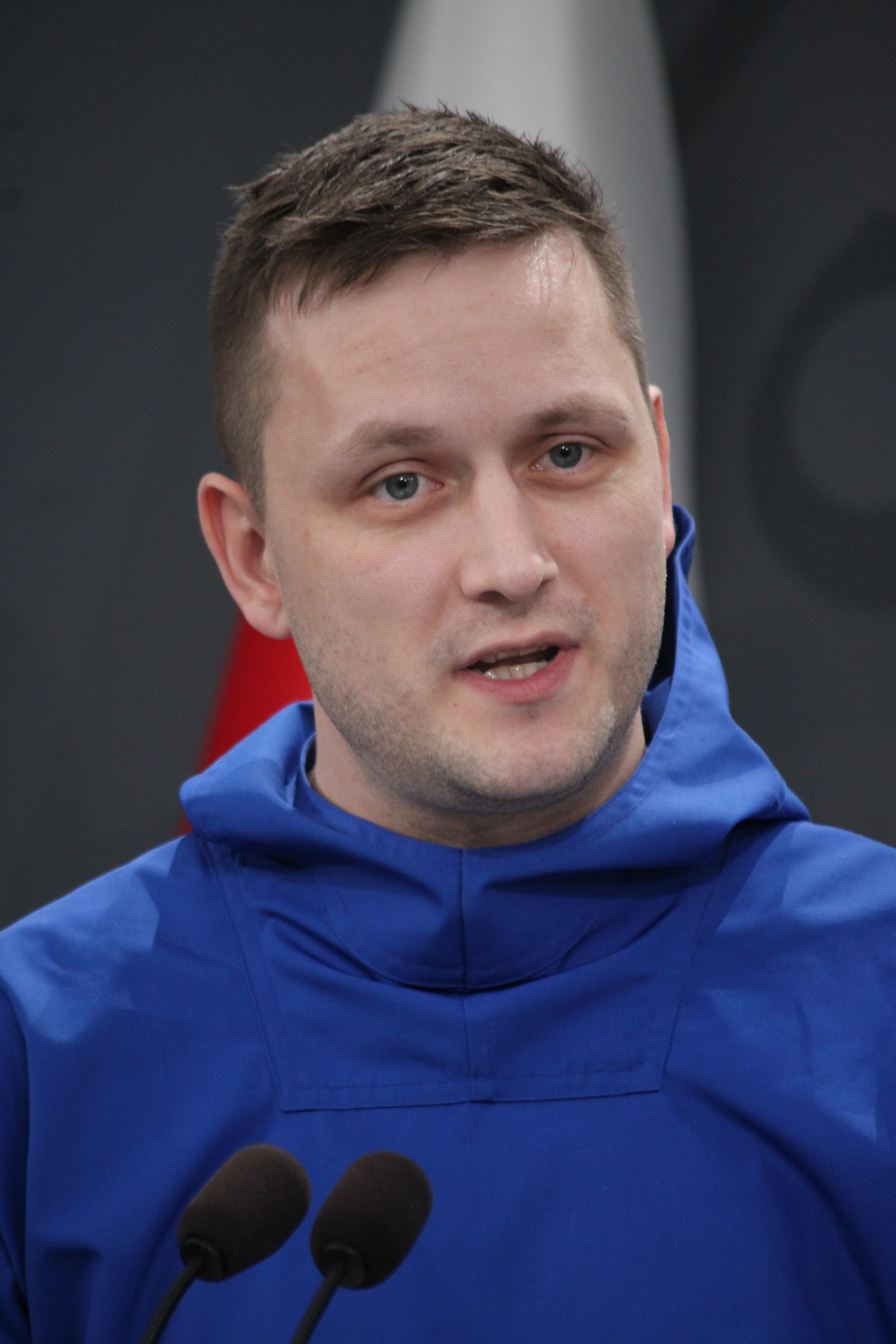
- Nielsen in 2026
- Date formed: 28 March 2025

People and organisations
- Head of state: Frederik X
- Premier of Greenland: Jens-Frederik Nielsen
- Member parties: Democrats; Inuit Ataqatigiit; Atassut
- Status in legislature: Coalition Government (Majority)
- Opposition party: Naleraq; Siumut (since 13 March 2026)

History
- Election: 11 March 2025
- Predecessor: Egede II

The Nielsen cabinet is the current government of Greenland, since 7 April 2025. On 13 March 2026 Siumut announced they were leaving the government.

== Ministers ==
Portfolio	Minister	Took office	Left office	Party	Ref
The Premier's Office
Premier of Greenland	Jens-Frederik Nielsen	7 April 2025	Incumbent	Democrats	
Minister of Finance and Taxation	Múte Bourup Egede	7 April 2025	Incumbent	Inuit Ataqatigiit	
Minister of Foreign Affairs and Research/Science	Vivian Motzfeldt	7 April 2025	13 March 2026	Siumut	
Minister of Foreign Affairs and Research/Science	Múte Bourup Egede	14 April 2026	Incumbent	Inuit Ataqatigiit	
Minister of Education, Culture, Sports, Youth, and the Church	Nivi Olsen	7 April 2025	Incumbent	Democrats	
Minister of Industry, Raw Materials, Mining, Energy, Law Enforcement, and Equality	Naaja H. Nathanielsen	7 April 2025	Incumbent	Inuit Ataqatigiit	
Minister of Health and Disability	Anna Wangenheim	7 April 2025	Incumbent	Democrats	
Minister of Children, Youth and Families	Maasi Pedersen	7 April 2025	Incumbent	Inuit Ataqatigiit	
Minister of Fisheries and Aquaculture, Hunting, Agriculture, Self-Sustainability, and the Environment	Peter Borg	7 April 2025	Incumbent	Democrats	
Minister of Social Affairs, Employment/Labour Market, and Home Affairs	Bentiaraq Ottosen	7 April 2025	Incumbent	Atassut	
Minister of Housing, Infrastructure, and Outer Districts	Aqqaluaq B. Egede	7 April 2025	Incumbent	Inuit Ataqatigiit	

== See also ==
- Politics of Greenland
