= Second Egede cabinet =

Government of Greenland from 2022 to 2025

Egede's second cabinet
- 22nd Cabinet of Greenland

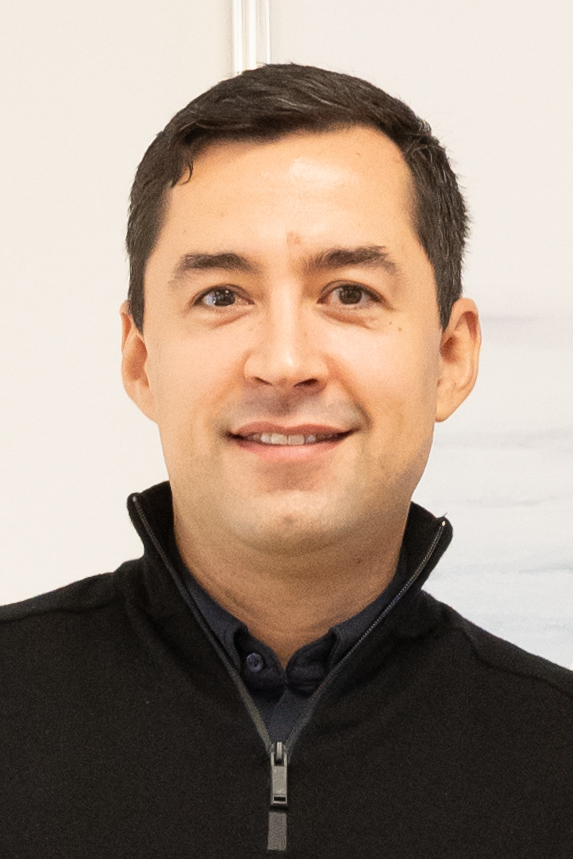
- Egede in 2024
- Date formed: 5 April 2022
- Date dissolved: 7 April 2025

People and organisations
- Head of state: Margrethe II; Frederik X
- Premier of Greenland: Múte Bourup Egede
- Member parties: Inuit Ataqatigiit; Siumut
- Status in legislature: Majority (coalition)

History
- Election: 2021
- Predecessor: First Egede cabinet
- Successor: Nielsen cabinet

The Egede II cabinet governed Greenland from April 2022 to April 2025.

== Ministers ==
Cabinet
| Portfolio | Minister | Took office | Left office | Party | Ref |
The Premier's Office
| Premier of Greenland | Múte Bourup Egede | 5 April 2021 | 7 April 2025 | Inuit Ataqatigiit | |
| Minister of Housing and Infrastructure | Erik Jensen | 5 April 2021 | 7 April 2025 | Siumut | |
| Minister of Finance and Equality | Naaja Nathanielsen | 5 April 2021 | 7 April 2025 | Inuit Ataqatigiit | |
| Minister of Raw Materials and the Judiciary | Aqqaluaq B. Egede | 5 April 2021 | 7 April 2025 | Inuit Ataqatigiit | |
| Minister of Children, Young People, Families and Health | Mimi Karlsen | 5 April 2021 | 7 April 2025 | Inuit Ataqatigiit | |
| Minister of Education, Culture, Sports and Church | Peter P. Olsen | 5 April 2021 | 7 April 2025 | Inuit Ataqatigiit | |
| Minister of Agriculture, Self-Sufficiency, Energy and Environment | Kalistat Lund | 5 April 2021 | 7 April 2025 | Inuit Ataqatigiit | |
| Minister of Foreign Affairs, Business and Trade | Vivian Motzfeldt | 5 April 2021 | 7 April 2025 | Siumut | |
| Minister of Fishing and Catching | Karl Tobiassen | 5 April 2021 | 7 April 2025 | Siumut | |
| Minister of Social Affairs, Home Affairs and the Labour Market | Jess Svane | 5 April 2021 | 7 April 2025 | Siumut | |

== See also ==
- Politics of Greenland
- First Egede cabinet
