= First Egede cabinet =

Government of Greenland (2021–2022)

Egede's first cabinet
- 21st Cabinet of Greenland

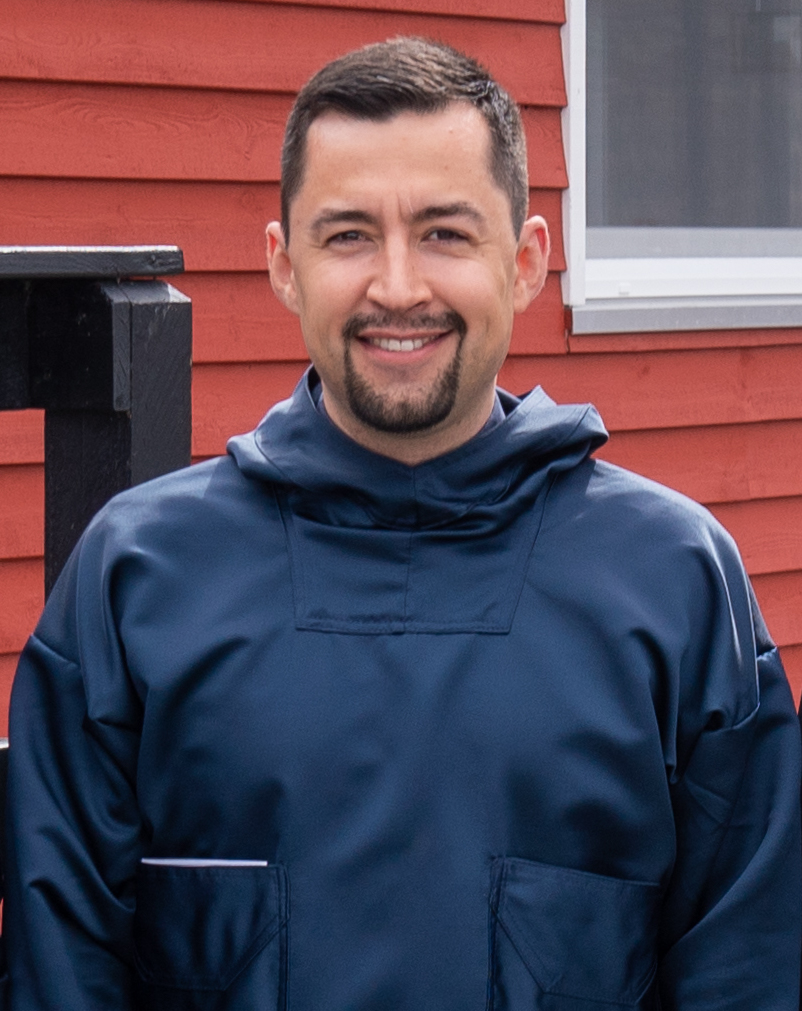
- Egede in 2021
- Date formed: 23 April 2021
- Date dissolved: 4 April 2022

People and organisations
- Head of state: Margrethe II of Denmark
- Premier of Greenland: Múte Bourup Egede
- Member parties: Inuit Ataqatigiit; Naleraq
- Status in legislature: Majority (coalition)

History
- Election: 2021
- Predecessor: Kielsen VII
- Successor: Egede II

The first cabinet of Múte Bourup Egede was the Greenlandic government from 23 April 2021 to 4 April 2022. It was a coalition consisting of the left-wing Inuit Ataqatigiit and the centrist Naleraq. It was replaced by the Egede's second cabinet, when Siumut replaced Naleraq.

== List of ministers ==
Cabinet
Portfolio	Minister	Took office	Left office	Party	Ref
The Premier's Office
Premier of Greenland	Múte Bourup Egede	23 April 2021	4 April 2022	Inuit Ataqatigiit	
Minister for Finance and Domestic Affairs	Asii Chemnitz Narup	23 April 2021	4 April 2022	Inuit Ataqatigiit	
Minister for Housing, Infrastructure, Minerals and Gender Equality	Naaja Nathanielsen	23 April 2021	4 April 2022	Inuit Ataqatigiit	
Minister for Housing and Infrastructure	Mariane Paviasen	November 2021	4 April 2022	Inuit Ataqatigiit	
Minister for Education, Culture, Sports and Church	Peter P. Olsen	23 April 2021	4 April 2022	Inuit Ataqatigiit	
Minister for Fisheries and Hunting	Aqqaluaq B. Egede	23 April 2021	4 April 2022	Inuit Ataqatigiit	
Minister for Agriculture, Self-Sufficiency, Energy and Environment	Kalistat Lund	23 April 2021	4 April 2022	Inuit Ataqatigiit	
Minister for Health	Kirsten L. Fencker	23 April 2021	4 April 2022	Naleraq	
Minister for Social Affairs and Labour	Mimi Karlsen	23 April 2021	4 April 2022	Inuit Ataqatigiit	
Minister for Justice	Eqaluk Høegh	23 April 2021	7 August 2021	Inuit Ataqatigiit	
Minister for Justice	Naaja Nathanielsen	7 August 2021	4 April 2022	Inuit Ataqatigiit	
Minister for Children, Youth and Families	Eqaluk Høegh	23 April 2021	27 August 2021	Inuit Ataqatigiit	
Minister for Children, Youth and Families	Mimi Karlsen	27 August 2021	27 September 2021	Inuit Ataqatigiit	
Minister for Children, Youth and Families	Paneeraq Olsen	27 September 2021	4 April 2022	Naleraq	
Minister for Foreign Affairs and Climate	Pele Broberg	23 April 2021	27 September 2021	Naleraq	
Minister for Foreign Affairs and Climate	Múte Bourup Egede (act.)	27 September 2021	4 April 2022	Inuit Ataqatigiit	
Minister for Industry and Trade	Pele Broberg	23 April 2021	4 April 2022	Naleraq	

== See also ==
- Cabinet of Greenland

Preceded by Kielsen VII	Cabinet of Greenland; 23 April 2021 - 4 April 2022	Succeeded by Egede II
