= Egede =

Egede may refer to:

== Places ==
- Egede (crater), a lunar crater
- Egede, Netherlands
- Egede, Enugu, Nigeria
- Hans Egede Church, Nuuk, Greenland

== People ==
- Hans Egede (1686–1758), Dano-Norwegian merchant and missionary to Greenland
- Hans Egede Budtz (1889–1968), Danish stage and film actor
- Hans Egede Saabye (1746–1817), Danish missionary and scholar in Greenland, and grandson of Hans Egede
- Múte Bourup Egede (born 1987), Greenlandic politician
- Paul Egede (1708–1789), Dano-Norwegian missionary and scholar in Greenland, and son of Hans Egede
- Stine Egede (born 1964), Greenlandic politician
- Adam Egede-Nissen (1868–1952), Norwegian communist politician
- Aud Egede-Nissen (1893–1974), Norwegian actress
