= Greenlandic people in Denmark =

(Greenland) Greenlandic Dane (Denmark) Kalaallit-danskit
- Kingdom of Denmark in its region (special marker)

Total population
- 18,563

Regions with significant populations
- Copenhagen, Odense, Aalborg, Aarhus, Frederiksberg

Languages
- Greenlandic, Danish

Religion
- Predominantly Lutheran; See Religion in Denmark

Related ethnic groups
- Greenlanders, Danes, Danish Greenlanders, Greenlandic Americans, Danish Americans, Danish Canadians, Danish Australian, Scandinavian Americans, European Americans; Other Inuit ethnic groups

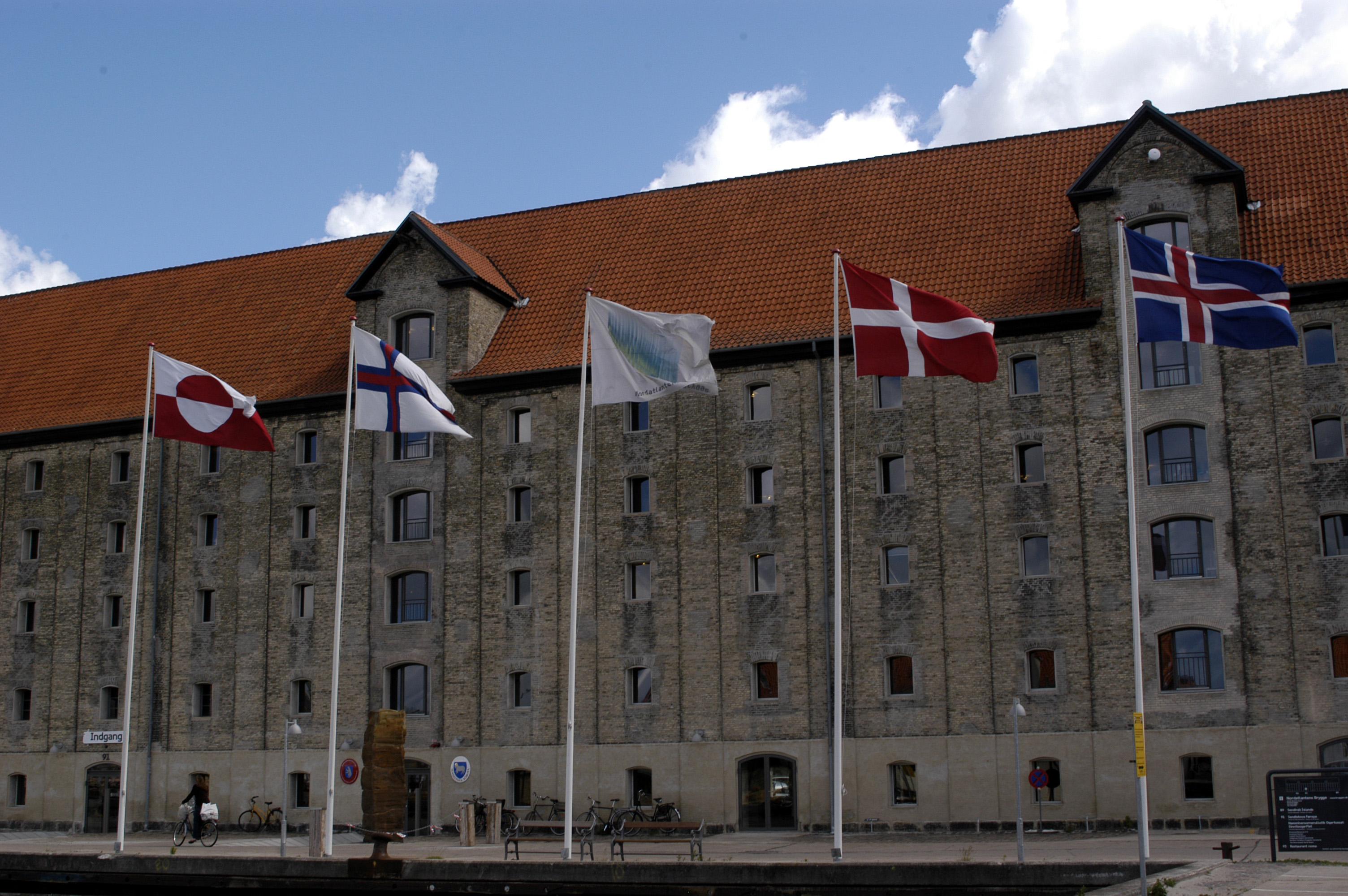
Greenlandic, Faroese, Danish and Icelandic flag in front of Nordatlantens Brygge, the North Atlantic culture house in Copenhagen, Denmark.

Greenlandic people in Denmark (Danish: Grønlændere i Danmark; also known as Greenlandic Danes) are residents of Denmark with Greenlandic or Greenlandic Inuit heritage. According to StatBank Greenland, as of 2020, there were 16,780 people born in Greenland living in Denmark, a figure representing almost one third of the population of Greenland. According to a 2007 Danish government report, there were 18,563 Greenlandic people living in Denmark. The exact number is difficult to calculate because of the lack of differentiation between Greenlandic and Danish heritage in Danish government records and also because the way in which people identify themselves is not always a reflection of their birthplace. As of 2018, there were 2,507 Greenlanders enrolled in education in Denmark.

Greenlanders have Danish citizenship as Greenland is an autonomous territory of the Kingdom of Denmark. This means they are entitled to the same privileges as ethnic Danes but also that Greenlanders miss out on services extended to newly arrived immigrants in Denmark. Greenlandic people are not recognised as an ethnic minority in Denmark.

Greenlandic people in Denmark experience higher rates of unemployment, poverty, homelessness and substance abuse than ethnic Danes. There are also high levels of prejudice and discrimination reported by Greenlanders living in Denmark. As per the COE recommendations, the Danish government has recognised the need to improve the situation of Greenlandic Danes.

== Statistics ==
While destitute Greenlanders only account for 10% of Greenlandic people living in Denmark, Greenlandic people do face higher rates of substance abuse, homelessness and unemployment. According to the International Work Group of Indigenous Affairs, rates of homelessness are 50% higher among Greenlandic people in Denmark than ethnic Danes. Greenlandic people residing in Denmark are also 12 times more likely to be receiving treatment for alcoholism. Greenlandic people report facing discrimination when dealing "with public authorities, the health care system, employers and the educational system." Prejudicial attitudes are reflected in Danish vernacular with the expression "drunk as a Greenlander" being used to describe anyone who has had too much alcohol.

== Classification ==
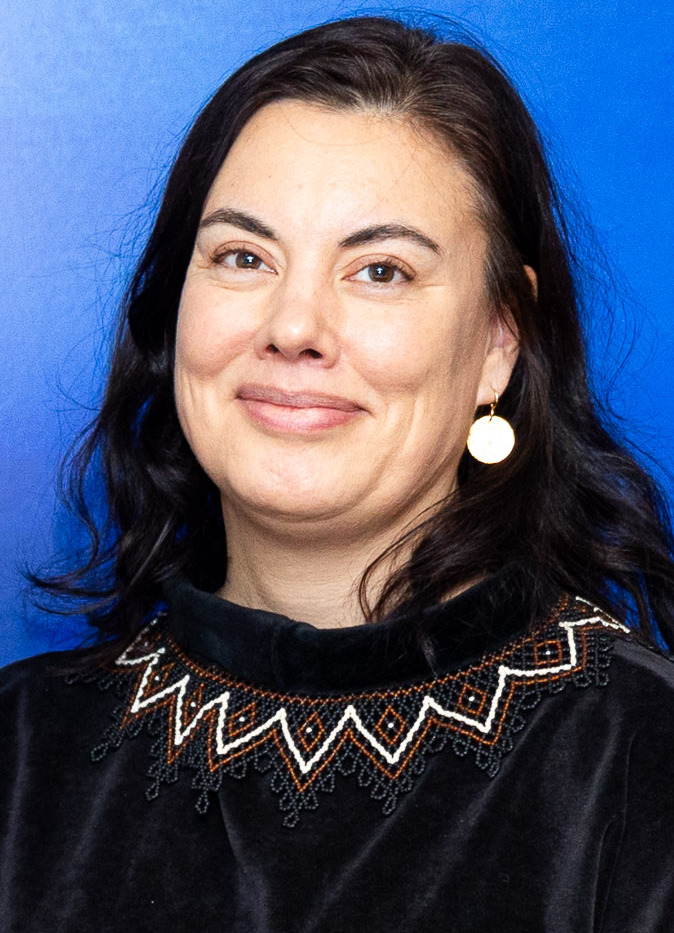
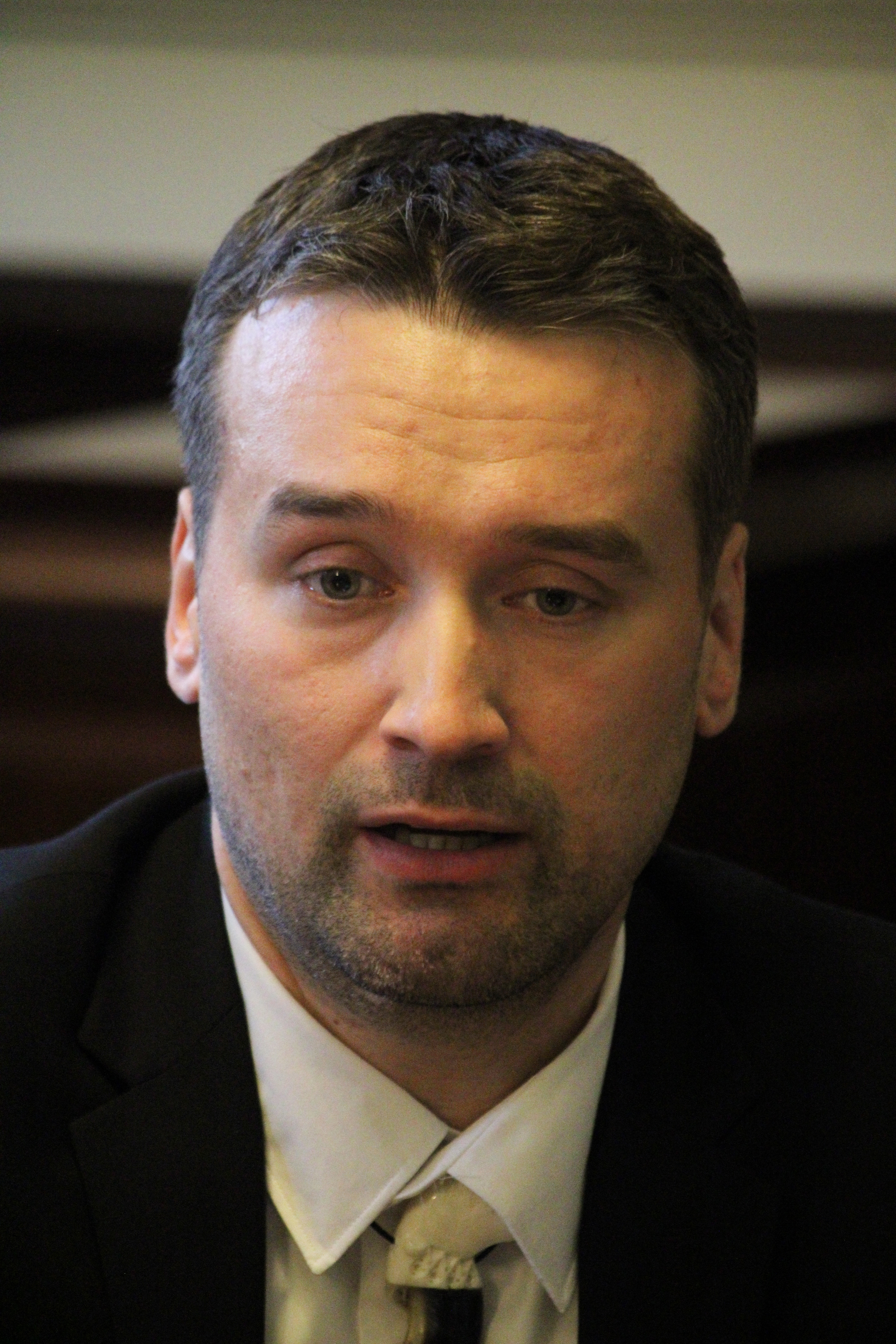
Naaja Nathanielsen and Qarsoq Høegh-Dam, the current two Greenlandic representatives in the Folketing

There is ambiguity regarding numbers of Greenlandic people in Denmark due to the nature of the Greenlandic-Danish citizenship. As of the 1953 Danish constitution, Greenland was made a constituency of Denmark and therefore Greenlanders were given Danish citizenship. This allows Greenlandic people to move freely between Greenland and Denmark. Under Danish law, it is prohibited to include race or ethnicity in its civil registration system (Det Centrale Personregister or CPR). This means Greenlanders are registered simply as Danes with no mention of their heritage. Unlike Greenlandic people, people from the Faroe Islands, another of Denmark's ex-colonies, are distinguished in the CPR.

=== "Mistaken equality" ===
The ambiguity surrounding the classification of Greenlandic people in the CPR has been referred to as "mistaken equality". It can mean that newly arrived Greenlanders do not have access to government support programs designed for immigrants. There are organisations such as the Greenlandic House that aim to assist recent Greenlandic immigrants to Denmark with job-hunting and finding long-term accommodation. According to Jeppe Sørensen, director of a Greenlandic House in Aalborg, it can be hard to find those in need of help because they are not registered in the CPR as Greenlandic. There is also the possibility that by reaching out to Greenlanders, they risk offending the majority of Greenlanders who live comfortably and don't need assistance.

Despite recommendations by the UN Committee on Elimination of Racial Discrimination, the Danish government continues to disallow ethnicity being mentioned in the CPR. The UN Committee warned this will inhibit an analysis of the "economic, social and cultural rights of vulnerable groups".

== Geography ==
=== In Denmark ===
Denmark's four largest cities are where most Greenlandic Danes are based. These cities are Copenhagen, Aarhus, Odense and Aalborg.

=== In Greenland ===
Emigration from Greenland is predominantly from Nuuk with 664 people leaving in 2019. Other towns with notable emigrations are Sisimiut with 103 people emigrating in 2019, 93 from Ilulissat, 86 people from Qaqortoq and 49 from Tasiilaq. According to Statista, 1 849 people emigrated from Greenland to Denmark in 2020.

== History ==
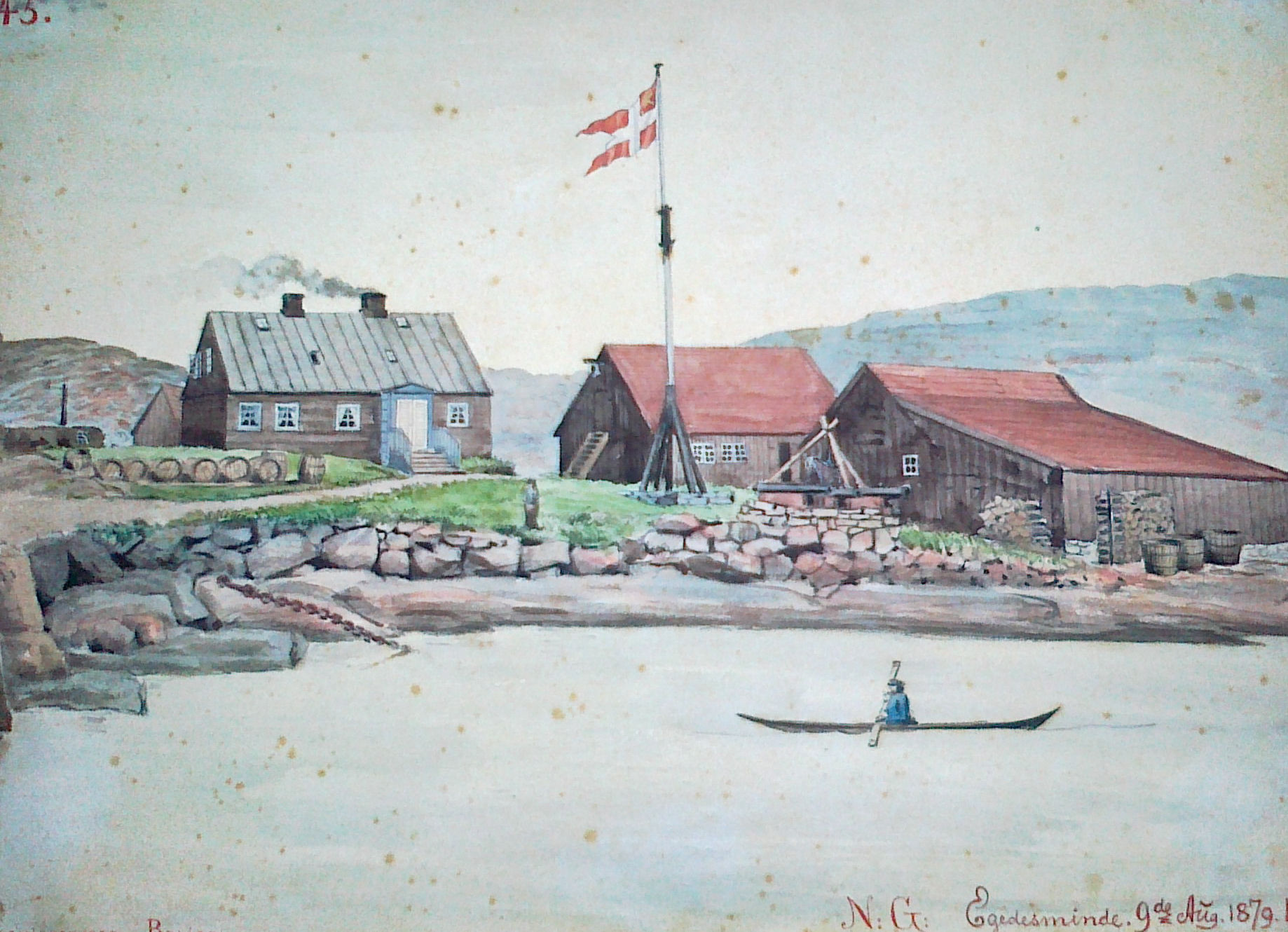
"The Colony Manager and the Home - Egedesminde" by Danish geologist Andreas Kornerup. Depiction of the colony manager in a boat in front of houses and the Danish flag in Aasiaat (formerly Egedesminde), Greenland, 1879. From the National Museum of Denmark. "Kolonibestyrer - Boligen. N.G. Egedesminde". Tegning af Andreas Kornerup, 9 aug. 1879.

=== Greenlandic-Danish relations ===
1721 marked the founding of the Royal Greenlandic Trading Company in Greenland by the united kingdom of Denmark-Norway and the beginning of Greenland's colonial era. By 1776, Denmark was exclusively in control of Greenland's trade and it was not until 1950 that this ceased to be the case. Greenland was under exclusive Danish trade monopoly until 1951 when the trading monopoly was abolished following Greenlandic complaints about their lack of access to other trade opportunities. In 1953, Greenland went from a Danish colony to an "integral part of the Kingdom of Denmark" and Greenlandic people. From there, Greenland was given "home-rule" in 1979 and "self-rule" or "selvstyre" in 2009.

=== Grønlanderhjemmet (the Greenlander home) ===
An early example of Greenlandic people moving to Denmark is the groups of Greenlandic elite that were sent to live in a boarding house in Copenhagen between 1880 and 1896. It was called the Grønlanderhjemmet or 'the Greenlander home'. The Grønlanderhjemmet was used as a base where the Greenlanders would stay while they received their training in various bureaucratic trades. They would then return to Greenland and begin work for the local, Danish-controlled government. According to Rud Søren, a Danish historian, the Grønlanderhjemmet provided a monitored environment in which the Greenlanders could increase their understanding of a ‘modern’, ‘civilised’ society in order to return with these lessons and disseminate them in their home country. The boarding house was monitored to ensure that the Greenlanders weren't exposed to too much luxury, which, it was feared by the Danish administration, could eventuate in their demanding better conditions back in Greenland. The idea, as stated in the original Danish publication outlining the proposal for the boarding house, was to help these Greenlandic people become more 'civilised' that they would then transport and disseminate on their return to Greenland.

=== 1951 "Little Danes" experiment ===
In 1951, 21 families were misled into agreeing to send their children to Denmark for six months for an education, they were told, that would improve their future. 22 Greenlandic children were taken to Denmark where they spent one year with foster families in Denmark. Unbeknownst to the parents in Greenland, on return the children would live in orphanages, not with their families and were only allowed infrequent visits. Six of the children were adopted by their Danish host families. The children suffered 'severe issues of identity and belonging as consequences of 'the experiment' and loss of their culture.'

The programme was initiated by the Danish government as part of the de-colonisation process required by the UN following the Second World War. 'Nyordningen' or 'The New Incentive' was thus founded in order to 'upgrade' Greenland's education, health and social services. The children would serve as a model for Greenlandic relations in Greenland going forward. This was in order to 'improve... the future of Greenland' by creating a prototype of the 'new type of Greenlander', referred to then as 'little Danes'.

It was not until 2020 that the children that were forced to be part of the experiment received an apology from Danish Prime Minister Mette Frederiksen.

"We cannot change what happened. But we can take responsibility and apologise to those we should have cared for but failed to do."

In 2010 a Danish film, Eksperimentet, was released depicting the experiment.

== Demographics ==
=== Students ===
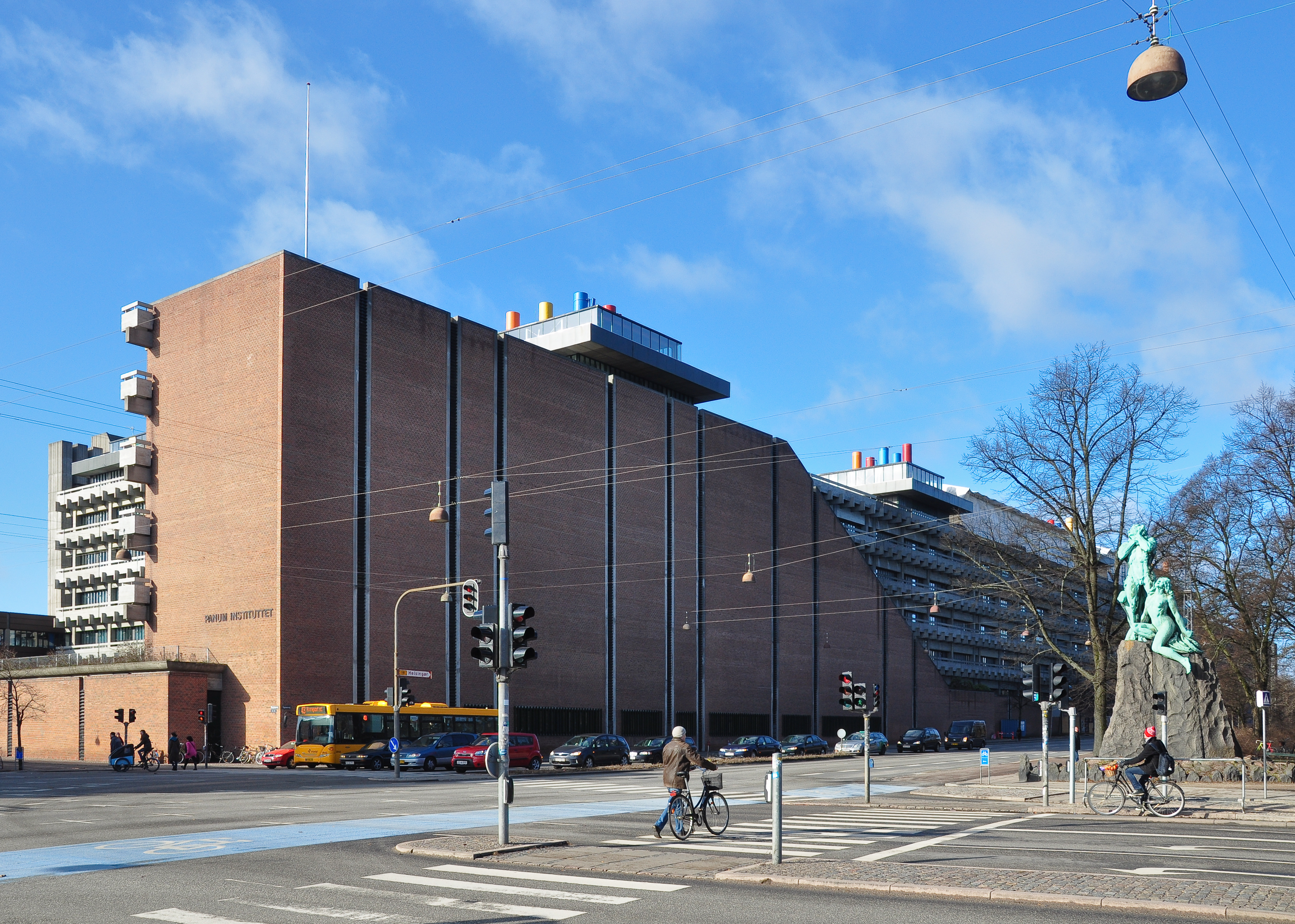
The Panum Institute, head building of the medical faculty of the University of Copenhagen.

In 2018, there were 2,507 people born in Greenland enrolled in education in Denmark. According to one case study, Greenlandic youth enjoy the opportunity to travel to Denmark for their education and do not do so merely out of necessity, as is often thought.

The Greenlandic government has made available extra funds for Greenlandic Houses in Denmark to help reduce the rate of Greenlandic students dropping out. This has been attributed to attitudes about study and mental health issues. Problems such as homesickness, poor academic performance, low self-esteem and motivation levels are also reported by Greenlandic students studying in Denmark. 17% of Greenlandic people in Denmark reported negative experiences at primary school. Greenland's government has provided programs that enable Greenlandic families that earn less than 45,000 euros per annum to send their children to continuation schools and has agreed to subsidise families with incomes from 45 - 67,000 euros to facilitate the same thing. Since 2013, Greenlandic students studying in Denmark have been permitted government grants to assist them in their studies. 30% of Greenlandic students studying at universities study abroad, and according to Statsbank, “the majority study in Denmark.”

=== Prisoners ===
Because Greenland did not have the appropriate facilities up until recently, those convicted of serious crimes have been sent to the Danish prison, Herstedvester, located outside of Copenhagen. CNN estimated the Greenlandic prison population to be about 30 people in 2018. In 2013, FRIIS & MOLTKE Architects and Schmidt Hammer Lassen Architects were awarded the contract to build a prison that will be suitable to house these prisoners. The 30 or so prisoners currently residing in Herstedvester will be offered the opportunity to transfer to the new prison, Ny Anstalt, situated outside of Nuuk, when it is completed.

== Indigenous Rights ==
Denmark has one officially recognized Indigenous group, the Inuit - the Greenlandic Inuit of Greenland and the Indigenous Greenlandic people residing in Denmark. Despite there being around 70,000 people living and identifying as an Inuk person, there is no official state registry defining the Inuit as Indigenous nor as a distinct people in the Kingdom of Denmark.

In Denmark the Greenlandic Inuit have Indigenous status in the means of ILO-convention 169 and have the same rights as everyone else with Citizenship of the Realm of Denmark. But people with a Greenlandic Inuit background face several challenges in relation to enjoying equal treatment and opportunities as to other nationals of the realm. Greenlanders are not considered an ethnic minority, although some experience special linguistic, cultural, and social challenges in Danish society in line with citizens with an ethnic minority background.

On 18 January 1996, Denmark ratified the international Indigenous and Tribal Peoples Convention, 1989 (ILO-convention 169) and voted in favour on the adoption of the proposal of the international Declaration on the Rights of Indigenous Peoples on 13 September 2007.

=== Racism ===
The Greenlandic population in the ghetto area Gellerup in Aarhus was subjected to racism in 2008, due to harassment from Arab and Somali immigrants.

== Culture ==
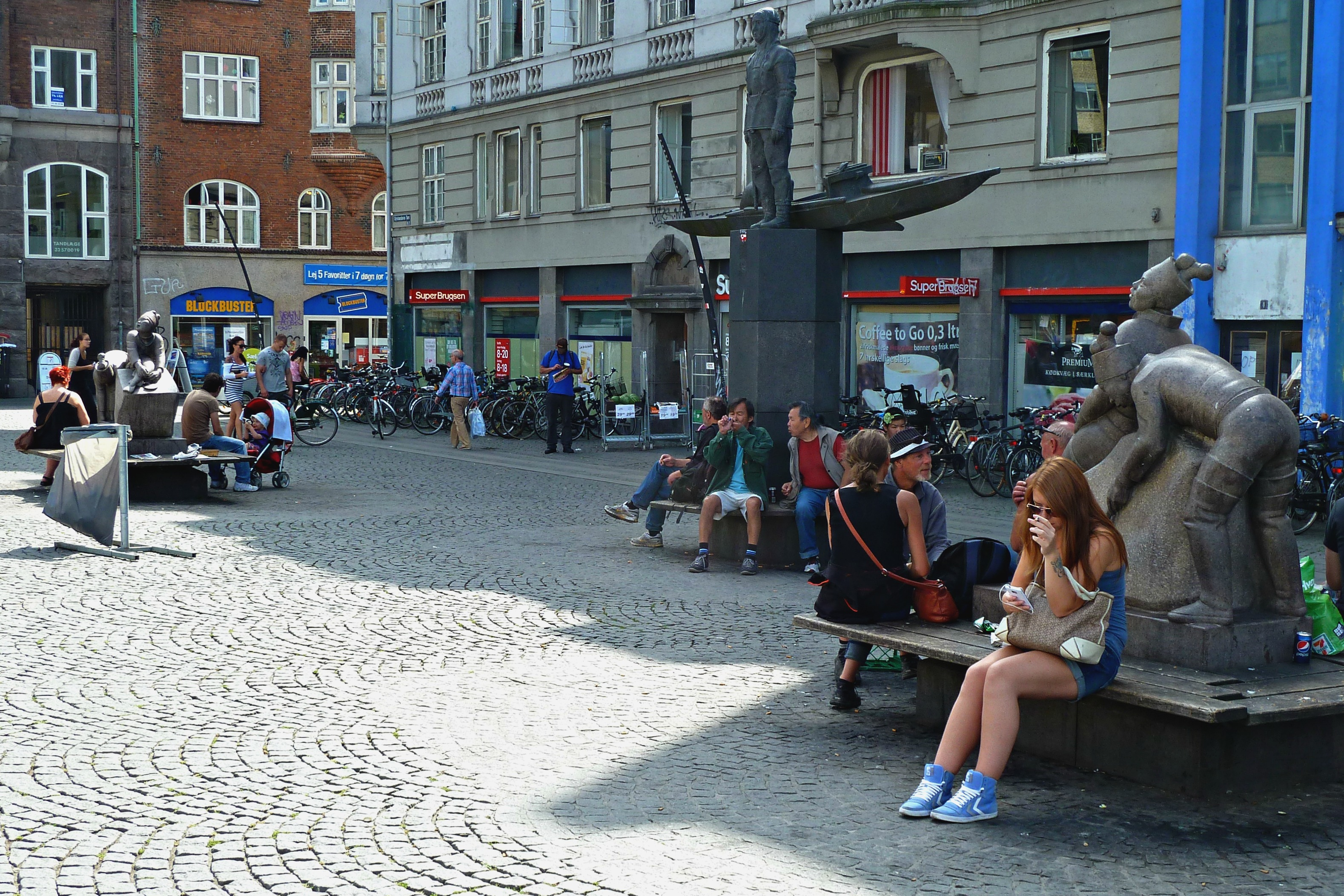
The three statues that make up the Greenland Monument (Grønlandsmonument) in Christianshavns Torv, Copenhagen by Svend Rathsack (1885 - 1941). The central statue is a Greenlandic man standing in front of his kayak. There is a statue on either side of him depicting women working. In one, two women catch the fish and in the other they flense and clean the fish.

The Danish Institute for Human Rights (DIHR) recommends that Greenlandic people be recognised in Denmark as a national minority, and that this would lead to better protection of the Greenlandic culture in Denmark.

=== Language ===
According to a 2015 report by DIHR, Greenlandic is not taught adequately in Danish schools and many children of Greenlandic heritage cannot rely on schools to teach the Greenlandic language to an acceptable standard. This contradicts the Danish legislation that languages that are part of the EU/EE community must be available for education if there is a petition granted on behalf of at least 12 children residing with their parents in Denmark.

=== Religion ===
The Greenlandic congregation of the Church of Denmark has approximately 16,000 members throughout the country. The Church of Greenland is an independent diocese of the Church of Denmark. The Church of Greenland and of Denmark are Evangelical Lutheran which is also the official religion Denmark and Greenland. A Greenlandic priest was appointed and inaugurated in Aarhus in December 2020 and conducts services, church services and pastoral care in both Greenlandic and Danish.

In Denmark, there are currently two Greenlandic priests. One of the priests serve all Greenlanders in Denmark and resides in the Diocese of Aarhus. The other priest is based in Copenhagen and serves Greenlanders who are on involuntary residence in Denmark. The congregation has applied for an additional position for general pastoral work. In addition, the congregation is in the process of applying for permission to establish a parish council for Greenlanders in Denmark. Greenlandic service is held on the first Sunday of the month in Copenhagen primarily at Helligåndskirken.

=== Arts ===
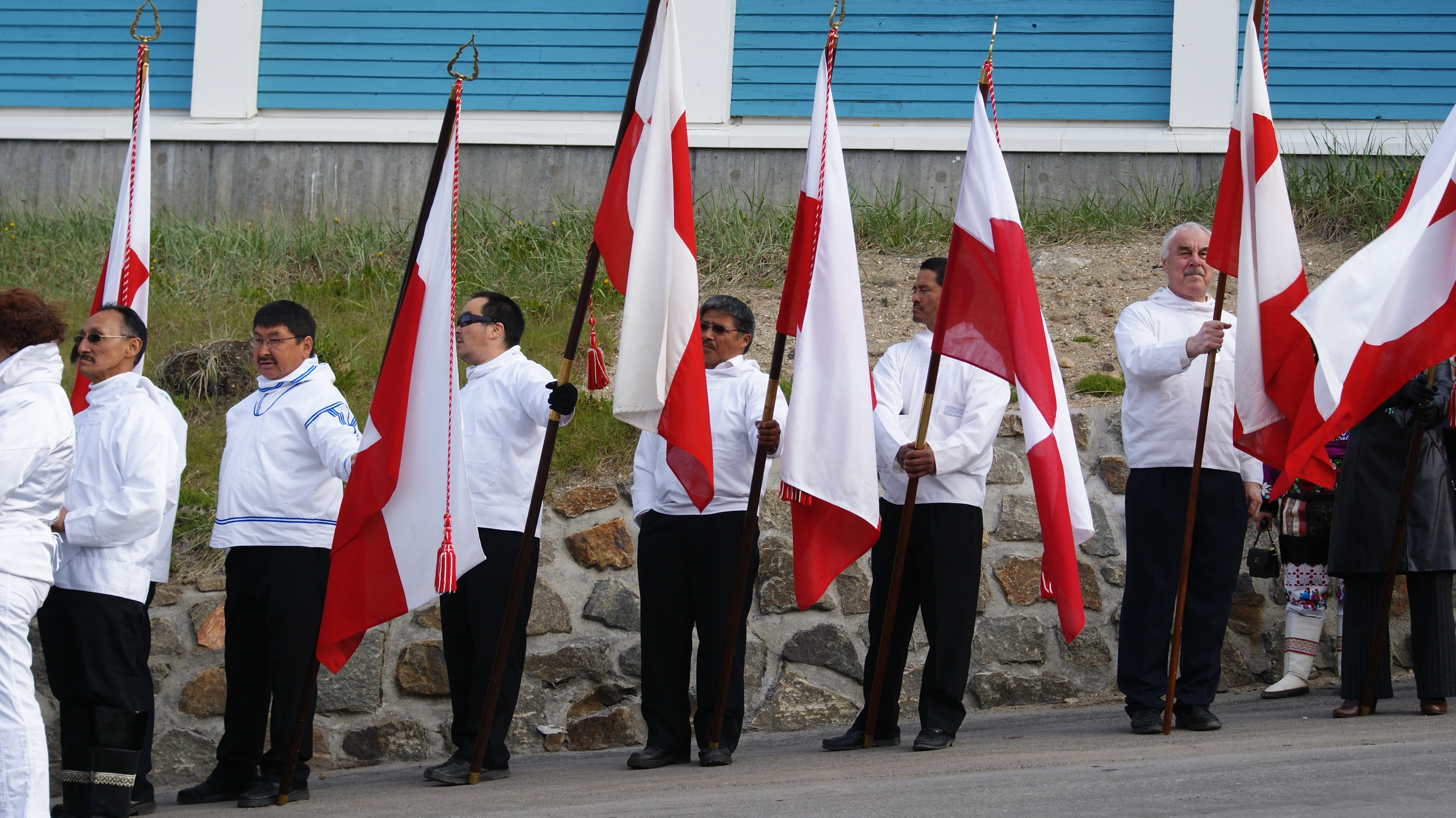
Greenland's National Day celebrations in Sisimiut, Greenland, on the 21st of June 2010, the first anniversary of the Self Rule. This day is also celebrated in Denmark by Greenlandic and Danish people alike.

North Atlantic House or Nordatlantens Brygge is an art and cultural centre located in Copenhagen, Denmark. The building is a reconstituted warehouse that was once a shipping central of the North Atlantic region. The North Atlantic House has shows exhibiting the history and culture of Greenlandic, Faroese Islands, Icelandic and Danish culture and history. This includes visual media such as film, dance and performance pieces, as well as lectures, research and debating. In 2021, the House displayed art from the Faroe Islands, installation art by Hrafnhildur Arnardóttir from Iceland and a Greenlandic-style sewing and embroidery workshop.

=== Celebrations ===
The 21st of June is Greenlandic National Day and is celebrated in Denmark annually, with prizes being awarded to local groups furthering awareness of Greenlandic culture and speeches given in both Danish and Greenlandic.

== Institutions ==
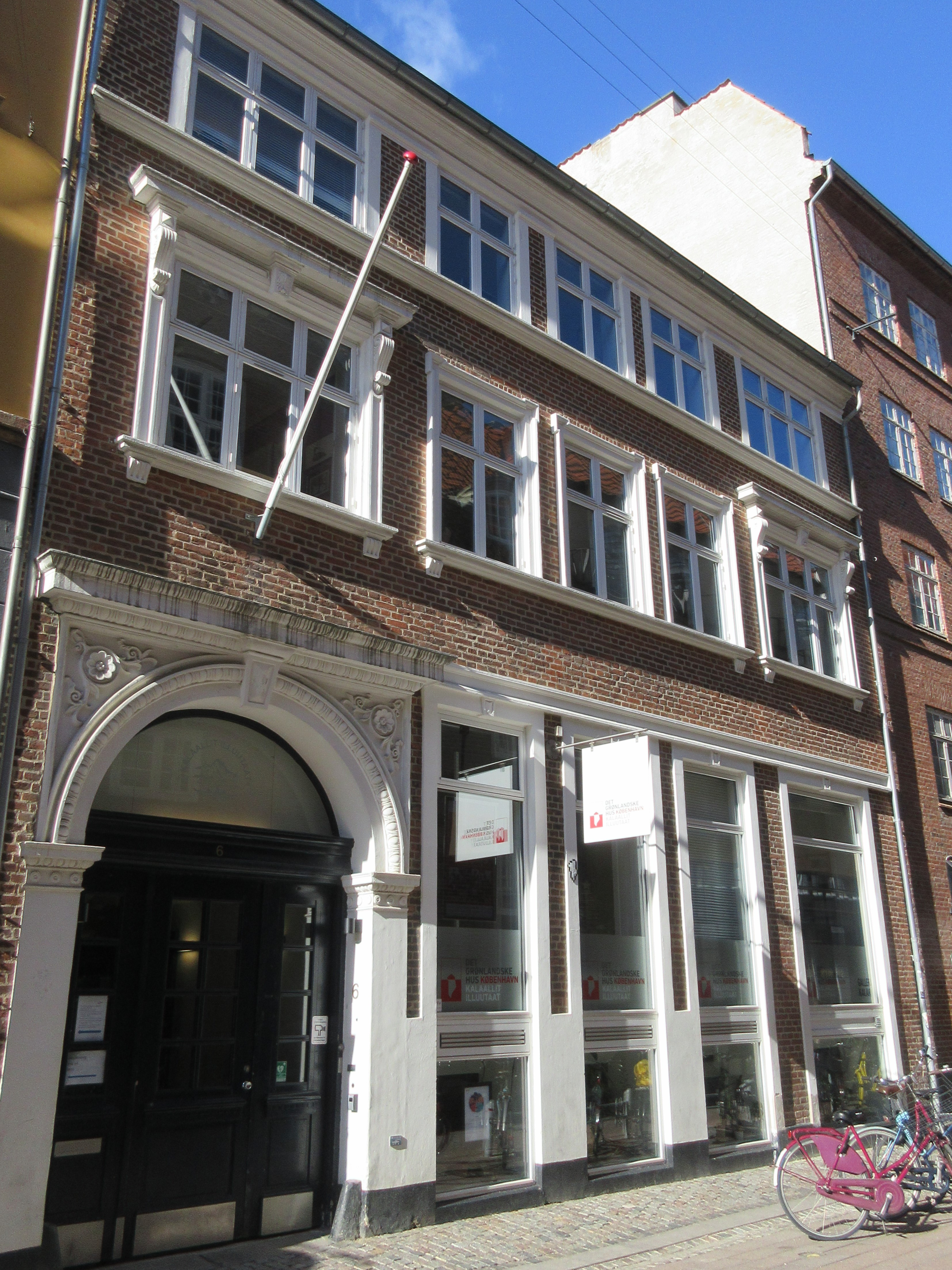
One of the Greenlandic Houses in Copenhagen, Denmark.

=== Greenlandic Houses ===
The Greenlandic Houses (Det Grønlandske Hus) are institutions designed to assist Greenlandic people while living in Denmark, particularly new arrivals and students. They are funded by the Greenlandic government. There are four Greenlandic Houses in Denmark and are responsible for their respective region. Aalborg covers the region of North Jutland, Aarhus the region of Central Jutland, Odense House is responsible for Southern Denmark and the house in Copenhagen for Zealand and the Capital Region.

The Greenlandic Houses offer counselling to Greenlandic people as well as health, legal, interpreting and accommodation assistance. This is extended to students from Greenland who have chosen to study in Denmark. The House provides student accommodation for a maximum of one year in order to help students find their feet and move on to more permanent housing. There are Greenlandic cultural activities run by the houses for the local communities such as cooking classes and music performances.

== Notable people ==
- Palle Christiansen (b. 1973), dentist, former Member of Parliament of Inatsisartut and former member of Naalakkersuisut for Education and Science, now living in Denmark
- Julie Rademacher, former Member of Parliament of Folketinget for Socialdemokratiet in Koldingkredsen, now living in Greenland
- Knud Rasmussen, polar explorer
- Minik Rosing, prominent scientist, professor of geology at the University of Copenhagen
- Nukâka Coster-Waldau, actress, singer, former Miss Greenland
- Bebiane Ivalo Kreutzmann, actress
- Julie Berthelsen, pop singer
- Bibi Chemnitz, fashion designer
- Kuupik Kleist (b. 1958), Greenlandic politician and Prime Minister of Greenland from 2009 to 2013

== See also ==
- Miss Smilla's Feeling for Snow (novel with a Greenlandic Danish protagonist)
- Greenlandic Inuit
- Danish people in Greenland
