= Paneeraq Olsen =

Greenlandic politician (born 1958)

Paneeraq Olsen (born 26 December 1958 in Sisimiut) is a Greenlandic politician (Naleraq) and civil servant. She became Minister for Children, Youth and Families in the Egede cabinet in 2021.

== Political career ==
Paneeraq Olsen was elected to Inatsisartut (the parliament of Greenland) and the municipal council of Qeqqata in the elections in 2021. She received 99 votes in the Inatsisartut election.

On 27 September 2021, Olsen was appointed minister for children, young people and families, where she replaced Mimi Karlsen (IA) who had temporarily held the post since Eqaluk Høegh (IA) had withdrawn from the Naalakkersuisut for health reasons the month before.

== Education and career ==
Olsen graduated from highschool in Nuuk 1992 and she is MPA from Ilisimatusarfik (University of Greenland), Nuuk 1999.

She was ministerial secretary for Hans Enoksen from 2001 to 2004. Olsen was municipal director in the former Sisimiut Municipality from 2004 to 2008, and after Greenland's municipal reform municipal director in Qeqqata Municipality from 2009 til 2019.
