= Debora Kleist =

Greenlandic politician and teacher

Debora Kleist (née Efraimsen; born 1959) is a Greenlandic politician (Inuit Ataqatigiit) and teacher.

== Biography ==
Debora Kleist is the daughter of David and Augusta Efraimsen. She has two children with her husband John Kleist and is a teacher by profession.

Kleist ran in the 2005 municipal elections and was elected to the Nanortalik Municipality Council. In the 2008 local elections, she was elected to the council of the new municipality of Kujalleq. In the 2009 parliamentary elections, she was the first candidate for Inuit Ataqatigiit and sat in the Inatsisartut for the entire legislative period until 2013. She did not stand in the 2013 election. However, she was re-elected in the 2013 local elections. In the 2014 parliamentary elections, she ran again and came in third place with Inuit Ataqatigiit. From there, she was a member of the Inatsisartut from September 2016 until the end of the legislative period in May 2018. She did not run in the 2017 local elections. In the 2018 parliamentary elections, she came third again and could have briefly become a member again in autumn 2020, but decided against it. She did not stand again in the 2021 election.
