= Kirsten Fencker =

Greenlandic politician (born 1979)

Minister of Health of Greenland
- In office 23 April 2021 – 4 April 2022
- Preceded by: Anna Wangenheim
- Succeeded by: Mimi Karlsen

Personal details
- Born: 3 September 1979 (age 46) Greenland
- Party: Naleraq
- Spouse: Nino Fencker
- Children: 3

Kirsten "Kiista" L. Fencker (born 3 September 1979) is a Greenlandic politician (Naleraq). She served as Minister of Health in the Egede I Cabinet from April 2021 to April 2022.

== Early life ==
Fencker was born on 3 September 1979.

== Career ==
Fencker completed an apprenticeship as an office assistant in 2005. From 2007 to 2014, she worked in the vocational training center Piareersarfik, later as a manager. In 2013 and 2015, she received further degrees in the field of business management. From 2014 to 2016, she worked as a project coordinator and acting department head in the Ministry of Finance. From 2016 to 2020 she was head of the national health care organization Paarisa. From 2020 to 2021, she was Head of Department in the Secretariat of the Constitutional Commission. Without ever having run for political office, she was appointed Minister of Health in the Egede I cabinet in April 2021. When Naleraq left the government in April 2022, Fencker also lost her ministerial post.

== Personal life ==
Fencker has been married to the musician Nino Fencker since 2007 and has three daughters with him.
