= Motzfeldt family =

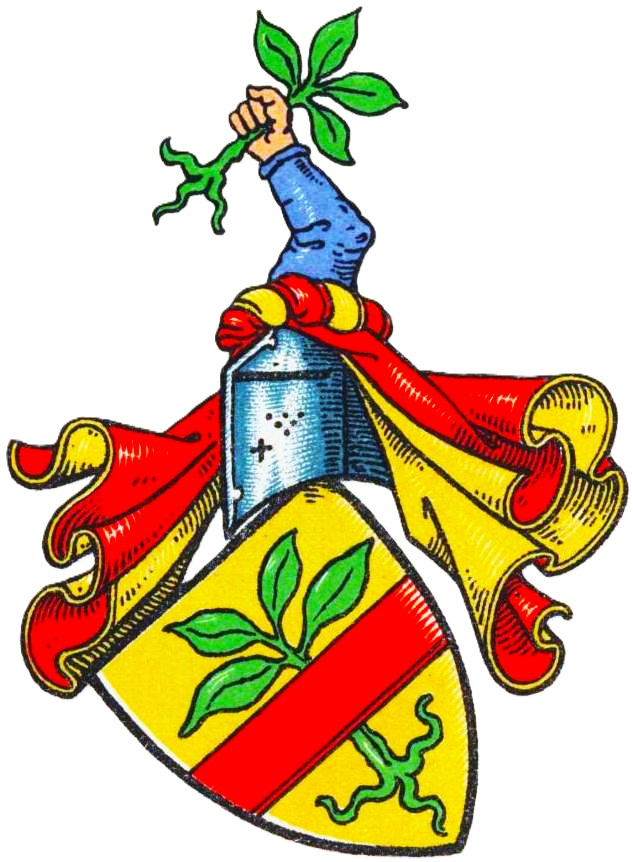
Coat of arms of the Motzfeldt family

The Motzfeldt family is a German and Dano-Norwegian noble family, originally from Westphalia. The German family branch received a confirmation of nobility in 1712. The family also has descendants in Greenland.

== History ==
The family originally came from the eponymous Moosfelde, today a district of Arnsberg, where it can already be found in 1533. It later settled in Hamm. Afterward, the family also held estates in the Bergisches Land and the Duchy of Jülich. In 1693 the family resided in the Netherlands at Lips, Palenstein, and Seggeward; in 1705 also at Hennef near Uckerath; and in 1732 at Eyll near Geldern. From 1724 to 1751 family members were based at Neuenhof in the Cologne district, and from 1817 to 1833 at Hardenberg in the district of Borken. On 12 January 1712, the brothers Johann and Henrich von Motzfeld were granted a confirmation of nobility.

=== Dano-Norwegian branch ===
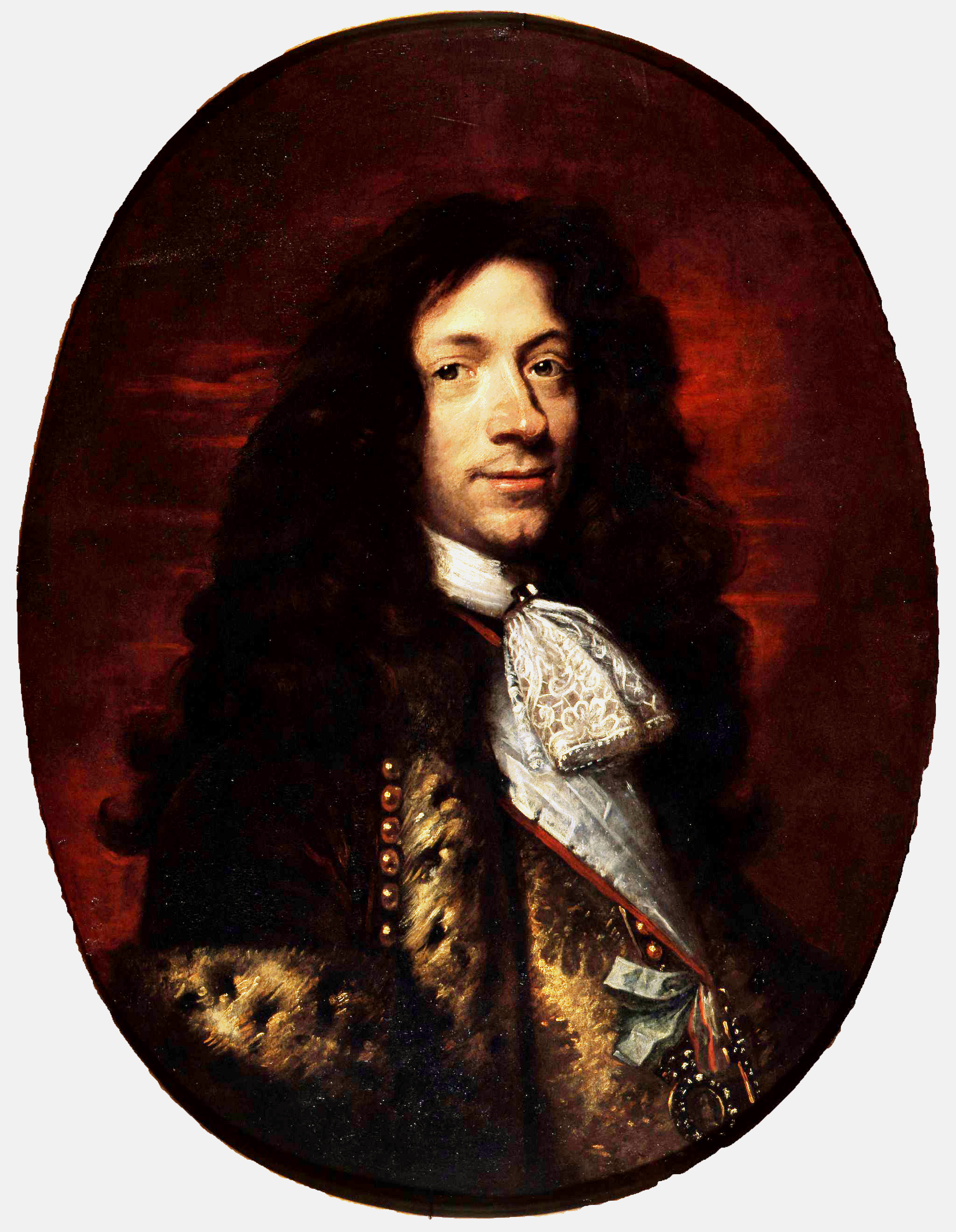
The statesman and de facto ruler of Denmark–Norway in the 1670s, Peder Schumacher Griffenfeld, was the son of Maria Motzfeldt

The wine merchant Peter Motzfeldt emigrated to Denmark and died as city captain in Copenhagen in 1650. His daughter Maria (1614–1693) was married to the wine merchant Joachim Schumacher and was the mother of the statesman Peder Schumacher Griffenfeld (1635–99), the de facto ruler of Denmark–Norway in the 1670s, and of the general war commissioner Albert Gyldensparre (1642–1696). Maria's sister Catharina Motzfeldt was married to the priest Søren Nielsen May and had numerous descendants in Norway, among them members of the Paus family. The son Peter Motzfeldt (died 1702) was a city councillor in Copenhagen and the father of Major General Peter Nicolay Motzfeldt (ca. 1660–1732), who was stationed in Norway and has many prominent descendants there. His son, Major General Peter Jacob Motzfeldt (1699–1791), was the progenitor of several branches of the family. Among the grandchildren of Peter Jacob Motzfeldt were two members of the Norwegian Constituent Assembly, Peter Motzfeldt (1777–1854) and Frederik Motzfeldt (1779–1848). Several members of the family were members of the Norwegian government and of the Supreme Court.

==== Greenlandic family ====
Major General Peter Jacob Motzfeldt was the father of Marie Sophie Motzfeldt (1732–1781), who married Lieutenant Colonel Lorentz Marcus Hanning (1739–1817). Their son, Norwegian-born Peter Hanning Motzfeldt (1774–1835), adopted his mother's family name and served as inspector (governor) of Northern Greenland. He became the progenitor of a Greenlandic family branch through his children with Cecilie Dalager, granddaughter of Danish Greenland merchant Carl Dalager. Among their descendants are the first Greenlandic prime minister Jonathan Motzfeldt and foreign ministers Vivian Motzfeldt and Josef Motzfeldt.

== Literature ==
- Anton Fahne: Geschichte der kölnischen, jülichschen und bergischen Geschlechter in Stammtafeln, Wappen, Siegeln und Urkunden, vol. 1: Stammfolge und Wappenbuch. Heberle, Cologne, 1848, p. 302 (uni-duesseldorf.de).
- Anton Fahne: Geschichte der Westphälischen Geschlechter unter besonderer Berücksichtigung ihrer Uebersiedelung nach Preußen, Curland und Liefland, mit fast 1200 Wappen und mehr als 1300 Familien. Cologne, 1858, p. 302 (Google Books).
- Otto Titan von Hefner, Alfred Grenser, George Adalbert von Mülverstedt: J. Siebmacher’s großes und allgemeines Wappenbuch, vol. 3 (Blühender Adel deutscher Landschaften unter preußischer Vorherrschaft), part 2, vol. 1, section 2: Der blühende Adel des Königreichs Preußen: Edelleute M–Z. Nuremberg, 1878, p. 271 (uni-goettingen.de) and plate 322 (uni-goettingen.de).
- Ernst Heinrich Kneschke: Neues allgemeines Deutsches Adels-Lexicon, vol. 6: Loewenthal–Osorowski. Leipzig, 1865, pp. 370–371 (Google Books).
- Leopold von Ledebur: Adelslexicon der Preußischen Monarchie, vol. 2: L–S. Berlin, 1856, p. 122 (digitale-sammlungen.de).
- Herbert M. Schleicher: Ernst von Oidtman und seine genealogisch-heraldische Sammlung in der Universitäts-Bibliothek zu Köln, vol. 11 (folders 832–915, Mockel–Palmer) (= Veröffentlichungen der Westdeutschen Gesellschaft für Familienkunde e. V., no. 80). Cologne, 1996, pp. 121–125.
- Max von Spießen: Wappenbuch des Westfälischen Adels, with heraldic illustrations by Adolf Matthias Hildebrandt, vol. 1. Görlitz, 1901–1903, p. 91 (uni-duesseldorf.de); vol. 2. Görlitz, 1903, plate 221 (uni-duesseldorf.de).
- Terje Bratberg: "Motzfeldt, norsk slekt". In: Store norske leksikon.
