= Upernaviarsuk =

Upernaviarsuk Upernaviarssuk
- Interactive map of Upernaviarsuk
- Sovereign state: Denmark
- Constituent country: Greenland
- Municipality: Kujalleq

Population
  - Total: 13

Upernaviarsuk is an agricultural settlement in Kujalleq, Greenland.

== Notable person ==
- Vivian Motzfeldt

== Sources ==
- Nunalerineq.gl
- Sagalands.com: Upernaviarsuk
- Mindat.org
- Maps.arcgis.com, confirmed by Oqaasileriffik, prepared by Asiaq
- Nomination to UNESCO´s World Heritage List – Kujataa – a subarctic farming landscape in Greenland (.pdf)
- Kujataa.gl: Det moderne landbrugs historie
- Upernaviarsuk in Den Store Danske
- Bank.stat.gl: population of Upernaviarsuk 1977–2020
