= Kalistat Lund =

Greenlandic politician (born 1959)

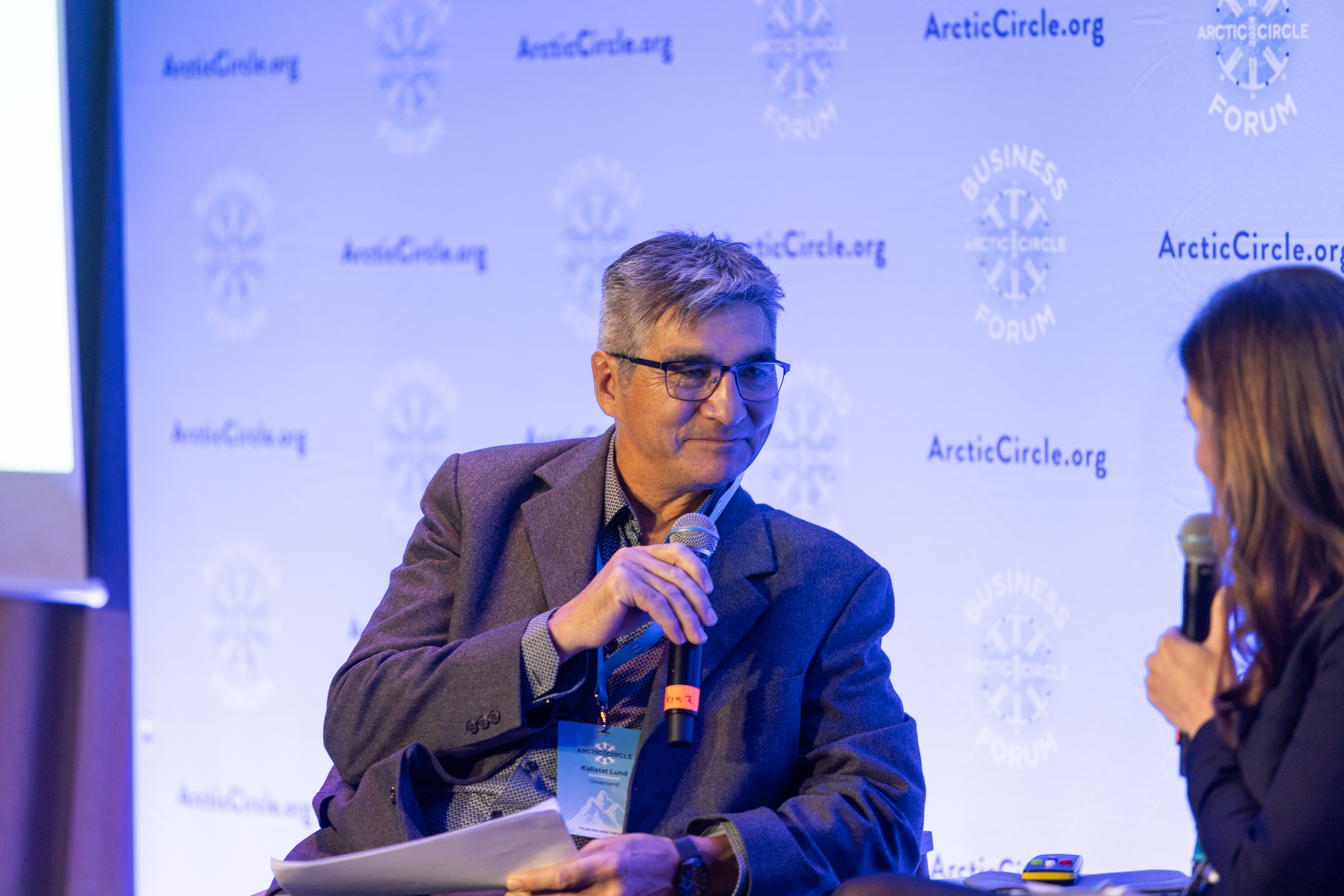
- Kalistat Lund at the 2024 Arctic Circle Assembly

Minister of Agriculture, Self-Sufficiency, Energy and Environment
- In office 23 April 2021 – 7 April 2025

Personal details
- Born: 8 May 1959 (age 66) Greenland, Kingdom of Denmark
- Citizenship: Kingdom of Denmark
- Party: Inuit Ataqatigiit (since 2013)
- Other political affiliations: Siumut (1978–2013)

Kalistat Lund (born 8 May 1959) is a Greenlandic politician affiliated with Inuit Ataqatigiit and previously Siumut.

== Early life and education ==
Lund was born on 8 May 1959, the son of sheep farmer Christian Adolf “Dolfe” Lund (1912–2010) and his wife Marie-Katrine Lund. Through his father he is a grandson of poet Henrik Lund (1875–1948) and his wife Karoline Malene Justine Haldora Egede (1877–1979). His grandmother and father are among the oldest Greenlanders ever. His older sister is Augusta Salling (* 1954). Lund attended the Folkeskole in Qassiarsuk from 1966. He then spent a year in Denmark and then attended secondary school in Narsaq until 1978, before taking the higher preparatory exam in Nuuk in 1980. He then worked as an assistant at Narsarsuaq Airport, where he came into contact with aviation. In 1982 he began training as an aircraft mechanic, which he completed in 1986. In 1988, he completed training to become a pilot. From 1991 to 2020, he worked as a helicopter pilot.

== Political career ==
Kalistat Lund became a member of Siumut in 1978. From 1997 to 2001, he was mayor of Narsaq Municipality. He ran for the first time nationally in the 2002 parliamentary election and achieved third place in the Siumut, from where he sat in the Inatsisartut for a while in 2003 and from April 2004 before leaving in April 2005 because Jørgen Wæver Johansen took his parliamentary seat. He was also chairman of the Selvstyre Commission, but had to resign because he was unable to win a seat in the 2005 parliamentary election. From his sixth place, he was a member of parliament for one day in January 2008. In the 2008 local elections, he elected to the council of the new municipality of Kujalleq. In 2013, he left the Siumut and became a member of the Inuit Ataqatigiit. For this, he entered Inatsisartut in the parliamentary elections in the same year and was able to defend his seat in the 2014 election. He resigned from parliament in April 2017 to concentrate on his job as a helicopter pilot. As a result, he no longer ran in 2018. After retiring from his career as a pilot in 2020, he ran in the 2021 parliamentary election and was re-elected to Inatsisartut and subsequently appointed Minister of Agriculture, Self-Sufficiency, Energy and Environment in the First Egede cabinet. In April 2022, he was given the same portfolios in the Second Egede cabinet.

== Personal life ==
Lund has three children with his wife Ivalo Egede Lund.
