= Inuit Party =

People's Party Partii Inuit
- Vice chairperson: Paaliit Mølgaard
- Founder: Nikku Olsen
- Founded: 24 January 2013
- Dissolved: 16 March 2018
- Split from: Inuit Ataqatigiit
- Merged into: Partii Naleraq
- Ideology: Greenlandic nationalism Separatism; Eco-socialism
- Political position: Left-wing
- Nordic affiliation: Centre Group
- Colours: Red; Light blue
- Inatsisartut: 0 / 31

Website
- partiiinuit.gl

The Inuit Party (Greenlandic: Partii Inuit, lit. 'People's Party') was a separatist party in Greenland, formed by dissidents from the then-governing Inuit Ataqatigiit (IA). The party was opposed to the so-called big-scale law, and wanted a referendum on the law. Mette Lynge represented the party in the Naalakkersuisut (Government) and was minister for dwellings, nature and environment. At the 2014 Greenlandic general election, the party did not win any seats in parliament.

== History ==
During the 2009–2013 government of Inuit Ataqatigiit, a "big-scale law" was passed that made it easier for foreign companies to obtain mining licenses and contract foreign workers. The law guaranteed foreign workers' right to strike and a local minimum wage. The law also allowed companies to deduct insurance and food costs from their pay; effectively, this gave workers a much lower salary. As a result of the law being passed, IA dissidents concerned about the exploitation of foreign workers, as well as the social and environmental impacts of new mining operations formed the Inuit Party. It won two seats in the 2013 general elections and formed part of Aleqa Hammond's coalition government. However, early elections were held the following year, in which the party lost both its seats.

On 17 December 2016, the party regained parliamentary representation when former Siumut MP Per Rosing-Petersen defected to the party and was elected as its leader. However, he left the party two months later to join Partii Naleraq.

It was announced at a press conference on 16 March 2018 that the party was being dissolved and that the former members of the party would now ally themselves with Partii Naleraq.

== Election results ==
=== Parliament of Greenland (Inatsisartut) ===
Election year	# of overall votes	% of overall vote	# of overall seats won	±
2013	1,930	6.4 (#4)	2 / 31	New
2014	477	1.6 (#6)	0 / 31	▼2
