= Laura Tàunâjik =

Greenlandic politician (born 1979)

Laura Tàunâjik Uitsatikitseq (born 1979) is a Greenlandic politician. She was a Siumut member of the Inatsisartut from 2014 to 2020, when she resigned to care for her children. From 2017 onward, she was a member of the municipal council for Sermersooq. Her work included advocacy for victims of domestic violence.

== Early life ==
Laura Tàunâjik was born in Kuummiit in 1979, in the house her grandparents lived in.

== Career ==
Tàunâjik was a Siumut member of the Inatsisartut, the parliament of Greenland, first elected in 2014. She was chairman of the committee on law, and a member of the committees on culture and education, and on family and health. She was also a municipal council member for Sermersooq, first elected in 2017.

Her work as a member of the Inatsisartut includes advocating for a women's center to be built in Tasiilaq. She said that due to the severity of domestic violence in the town—the second most of any location in Greenland, and Eastern Greenland having maternal domestic violence rates as high as 25 percent—it was necessary for a women's shelter to be built. About 1.3 million krone were appropriated in a proposed budget to build the center by the government of Sermersooq. Her work also included listening to testimony from Tilioq, a disability rights group. She retired from the Inatsisartut in 2020 to care for her family, as she had one small child and was pregnant. After her retirement, she kept her position in Sermersooq, and took on a job as a teacher in the village of Kuummiit.

In the Sermersooq municipal council, as of 2021 she is a member of the committee on children and family.
