= Hans Egede Church =

Church in Greenland, Kingdom of Denmark

Coordinates: 64°10′24.5″N 51°44′13″W

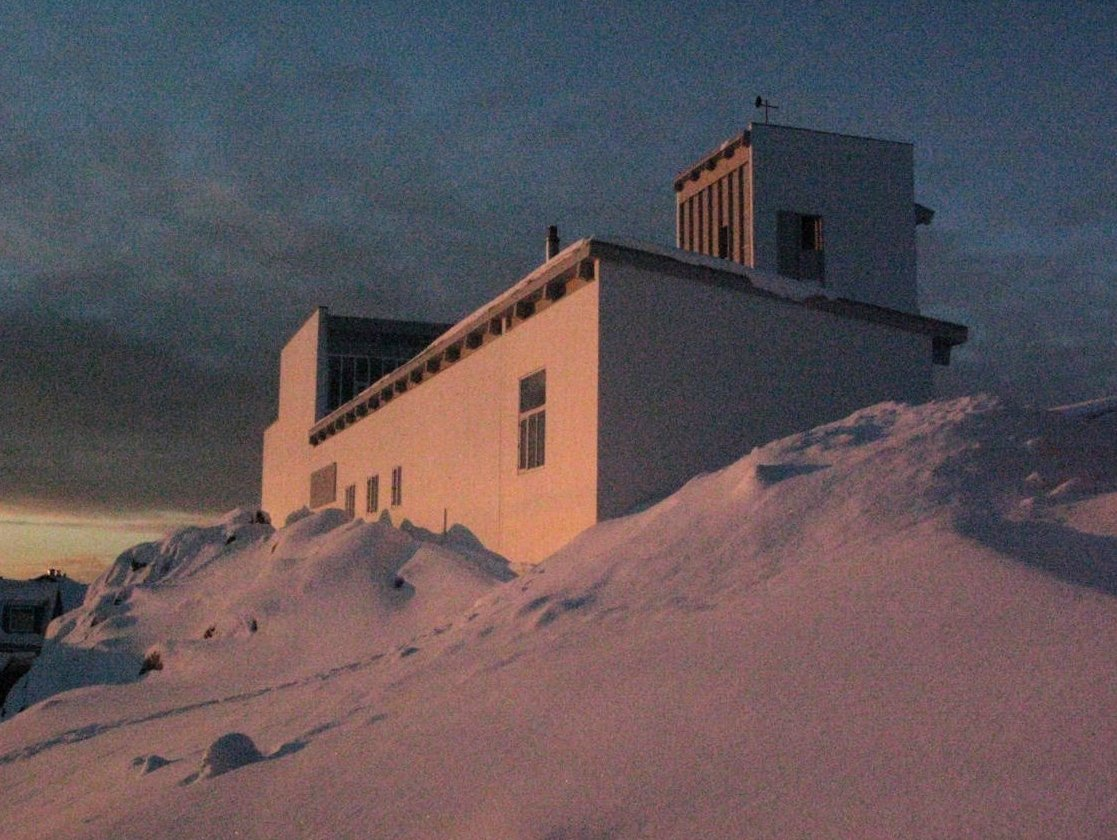
Hans Egede Church, 2007

Hans Egede Church (Danish: Hans Egede Kirke) is an evangelical Lutheran church in Nuuk, Greenland, located in the district of Old Nuuk. This church was consecrated on the 250-year anniversary of the founding of Hans Egede's mission. It is a wooden structure, named after Danish-Norwegian missionary Hans Egede.

The organ of the church is a 10-stop Frobenius organ from 1971.
