= Maliina Abelsen =

Greenlandic politician

Minister for Finance Government of Greenland
- Incumbent
- Assumed office June 2009

Personal details
- Born: 28 November 1976 (age 49) Nuuk, Greenland, Kingdom of Denmark
- Citizenship: Kingdom of Denmark
- Party: Inuit Ataqatigiit
- Website: "Government of Greenland".

Maliina Abelsen was the General Manager for Arctic Winter Games 2016 and is a former Greenlandic politician and MP for the party Inuit Ataqatigiit (IA), holding the position of the Minister for Finance in the Government of Greenland (Greenlandic: Naalakkersuisut), in office from 2011 to 2013. Between June 2009 and March 2011, Abelsen held the position of the Minister for Social Affairs in the Government of Greenland. Since 2020, Abelsen has been programme manager for UNICEF Denmark in Greenland.

== Early life and education ==
Abelsen was born in 1976 in Nuuk, the capital of Greenland, and resides there with two children and a husband.

Abelsen holds a Master of Policy and Applied Social Science (Macquarie University, Sydney), Cand.Scient.Soc. (University of Copenhagen, Sociologisk Institut). She was previously employed at the High Commissioner for Human Rights (UNOHCHCR - Geneva), the Department of Foreign Affairs in Nuuk, the Center for Documentation on Youth and Children (MIPI - MIO). Abelsen is a board member of United Nations Indigenous Peoples Partnership Programme.

== Duties ==
Abelsens' areas of responsibility as Minister for Finance is Budget, Burden and Task allocation, Structure policy, Tax policy, Block subsidy and Statistics Greenland
