= 2013 Greenlandic general election =

- 12 March 2013
- All 31 seats in the Inatsisartut; 16 seats needed for a majority
- Turnout: 74.20% (▲2.91pp)
Party	Leader	Vote %	Seats	+/–
Siumut	Aleqa Hammond	43.22	14	+5
Inuit Ataqatigiit	Kuupik Kleist	34.73	11	−3
Atassut	Gerhardt Petersen	8.21	2	−1
Inuit	Nikku Olsen	6.46	2	New
Democrats	Jens B. Frederiksen	6.26	2	−2
This lists parties that won seats. See the complete results below.
Results by municipality
Prime Minister before	Prime Minister after
Kuupik Kleist; Inuit Ataqatigiit	Aleqa Hammond; Siumut

General elections were held in Greenland on 12 March 2013. The opposition Siumut party emerged as the largest in Parliament, winning 14 of the 31 seats. On 26 March Siumut leader Aleqa Hammond became Greenland's first female Prime Minister. Two weeks later, Hammond was able to form a new government.

It was the 11th election in Greenland since the island gained self-rule in 1979.

== Electoral system ==
The 31 members of Parliament were elected by proportional representation in multi-member constituencies. They serve a four-year term.

In Nuuk, there was just one polling station.

== Campaign ==
The main campaign issue was exploitation of the island's mineral wealth. The ruling Inuit Ataqatigiit party supported allowing foreign workers, most of whom would be Chinese, into the country to work in the mining industry, whilst the Siumut party was opposed to the proposal. Rare-earth elements were of particular concern.

The discussion also concerned Greenland's evolving relationship with Denmark. Greenlandic foreign policy remained under the jurisdiction of Denmark following the shift towards self-governance in 2009. Therefore, it was ultimately Denmark's decision to issue work visas to the proposed Chinese companies. However, Danish prime minister Helle Thorning-Schmidt declared that Denmark would not intervene.

Partii Inuit leader Nikku Olsen also declared that the party would fight to make Greenlandic the sole language of parliament.

== Results ==
Party	Votes	%	Seats	+/–
Siumut	12,910	43.22	14	+5
Inuit Ataqatigiit	10,374	34.73	11	–3
Atassut	2,454	8.21	2	–1
Inuit Party	1,930	6.46	2	New
Democrats	1,870	6.26	2	–2
Association of Candidates	326	1.09	0	–1
Independents	9	0.03	0	0
Total	29,873	100.00	31	0
Valid votes	29,873	99.13		
Invalid/blank votes	263	0.87		
Total votes	30,136	100.00		
Registered voters/turnout	40,613	74.20		
Source: Election Passport, Parties & Elections

== Government formation ==
Following the election results, Siumut leader Aleqa Hammond claimed that she was "in no hurry to form a coalition" and would wait to hear the demands of the other parties. Hammond ultimately formed a government with Atassut and the Inuit Party. Siumut took six of the eight cabinet posts, with Atassut taking the Health and Infrastructure portfolio and the Inuit Party taking the Environment portfolio.
