= Agathe Fontain =

Greenlandic politician

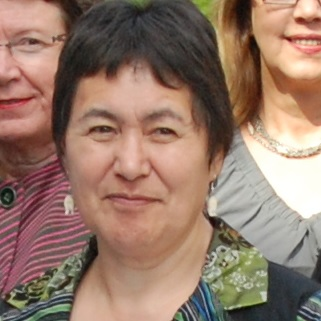
Agathe Fontain 21 June 2010

Agathe Fontain (born 1951) is a Greenlandic politician born in Sisimiut. She is a member of the Inuit Ataqatigiit, and a Minister for Health.
