= Juliane Henningsen =

Greenlandic politician

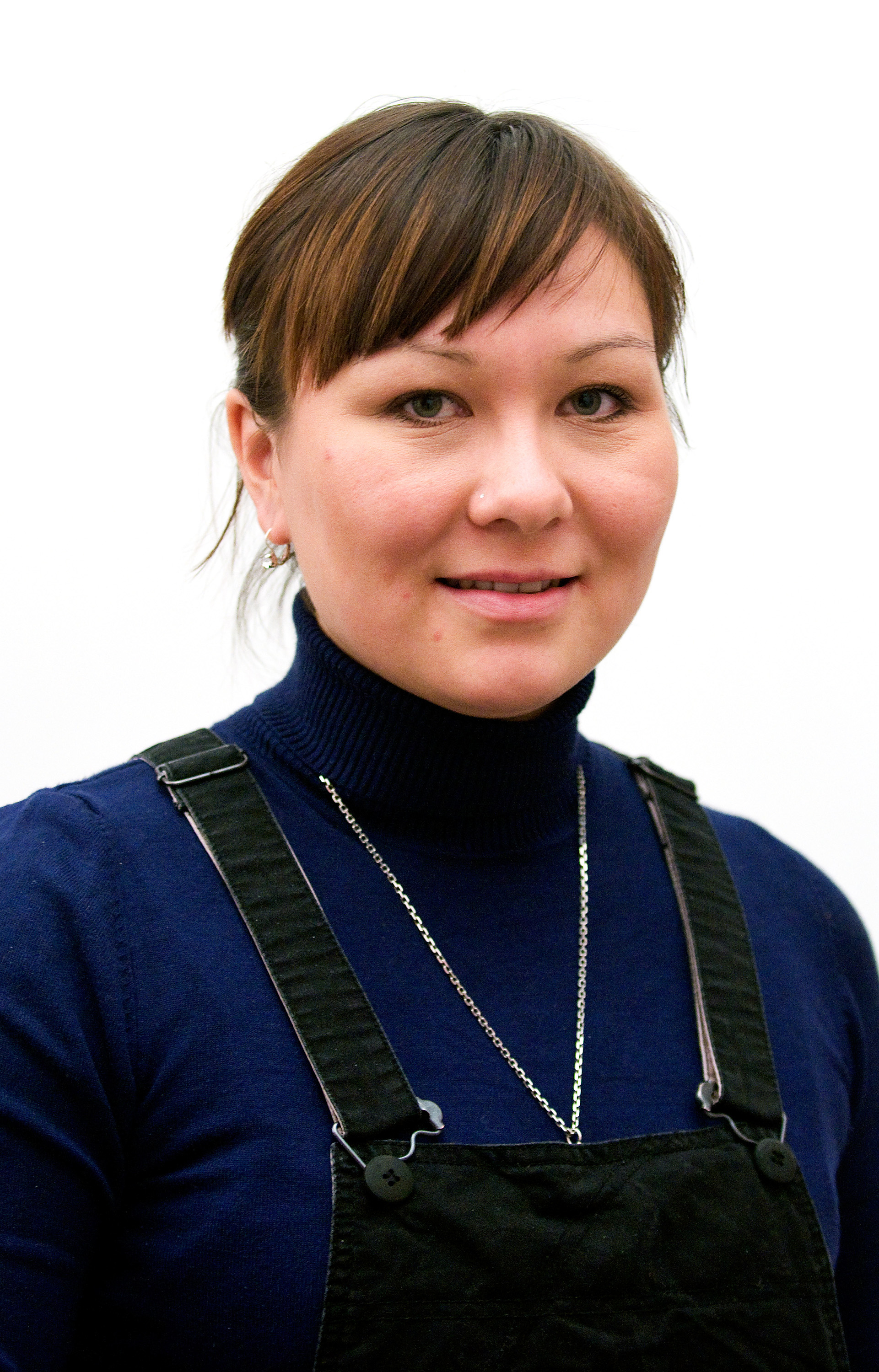
- Henningsen in 2008

Member of the Danish Parliament
- In office 2007–2015

Member of the Parliament of Greenland
- In office 2005–2007

Personal details
- Born: Ilulissat, Greenland
- Political party: Inuit Ataqatigiit

Juliane Henningsen (born 1984) is a Greenlandic politician who was elected to the Danish Parliament in 2007 as one of Greenland's two representatives. She served until 2011 when she was not re-elected. In 2015, she left politics to join the management team at the Halibut Greenland fishing company in her hometown, Ilulissat.

== Biography ==
Henningsen was born on 29 July 1984 in Ilulissat, Greenland, the daughter of the painter Niels Henningsen and Ellen Kruse. From 2005, she was a member of the Parliament of Greenland, representing the Greenlandic left-wing separatist party Inuit Ataqatigiit. In the Danish Folketing, she represented Inuit Ataqatigiit from 13 November 2007 until 15 September 2011. While a member of the Danish Parliament, she served on several committees including the Environment and Planning Committee, the Greenland Committee, and the Foreign Policy Committee. She was a substitute on the Nordic Council where she was a member of the Arctic Parliamentarians.

Following her term in the Danish Parliament, Henningsen believed she had successfully supported Greenland's interests in connection with whaling and seal catches in the EU as well as in representing the country's social interests.

In October 2015, Henningsen announced that as she had almost completed her university studies, she would leave Inuit Ataqatigiiits and join the management team at Halibut Greenland which would be in the interest of her family.

The leader of Inuit Ataqatigiit, Sara Olsvig, complemented Henningsen on her service to politics: "Julianne has over the past few years made a tremendous contribution to Greenlandic politics, both in the Parliament of Greenland and in the Danish Folketing. She has been one of our pioneering young politicians, openly tackling important yet difficult areas of policy."

== Website ==
- Juliane Henningsen Biography
