= Sara Olsvig =

Greenlandic politician (born 1978)

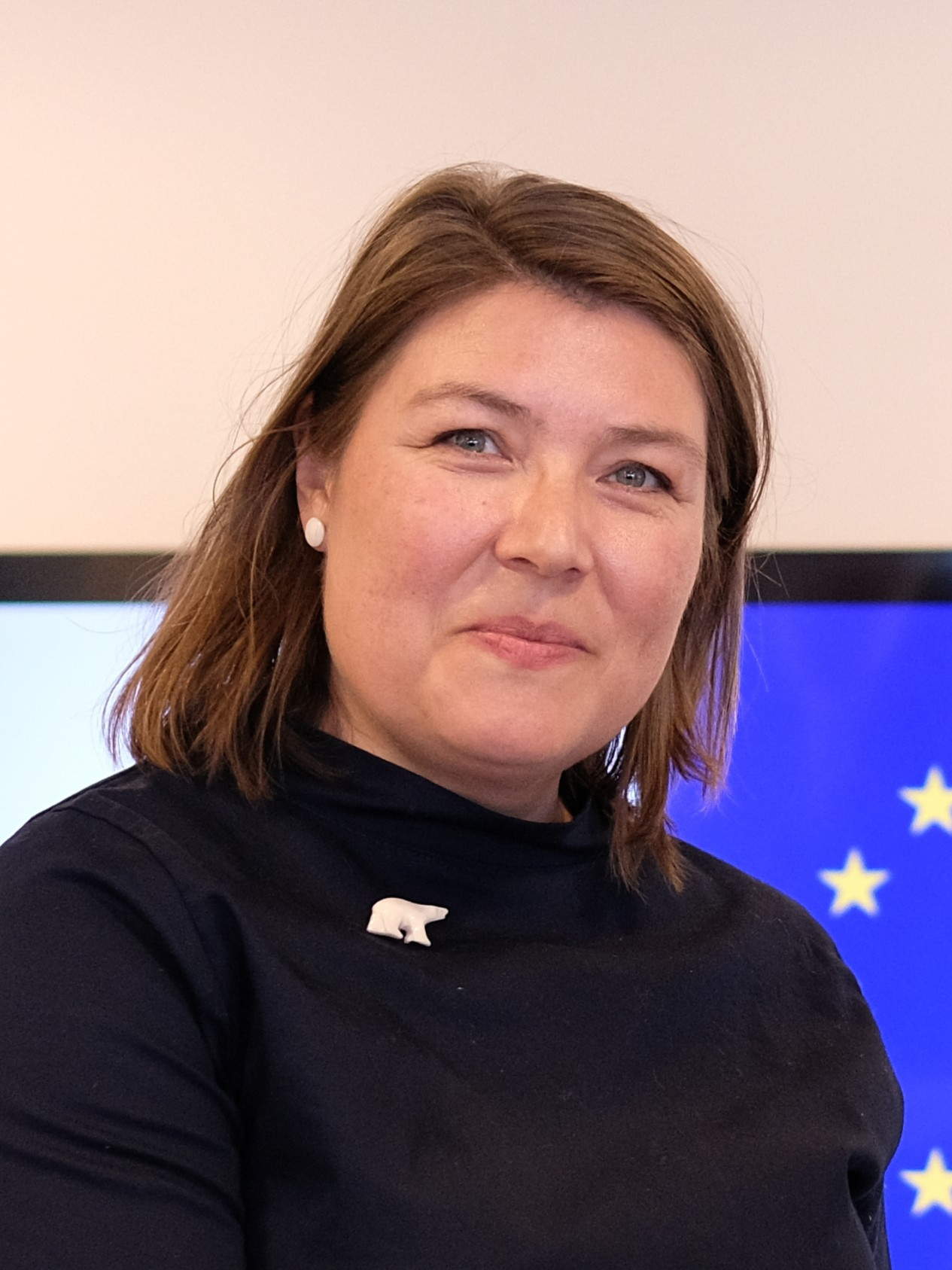
- Olsvig in 2026

Leader of the Inuit Ataqatigiit
- In office 30 May 2014 – 1 Dec 2018
- Deputy: Aqqaluaq B. Egede
- Preceded by: Kuupik Kleist
- Succeeded by: Múte Bourup Egede

Chairwoman of the Conference of Parliamentarians of the Arctic Region
- In office 20 September 2013 – 15 September 2014
- Preceded by: Morten Høglund
- Succeeded by: Eirik Sivertsen

Member of the Greenlandic Parliament
- Incumbent
- Assumed office 13 March 2013

Deputy member of the Nordic Council
- In office 15 September 2011 – 15 September 2014

The Danish Parliament's representative in the Standing Committee of Parliamentarians of the Arctic Region
- In office 15 September 2011 – 20 September 2013

Member of the Danish Parliament
- In office 15 September 2011 – 15 September 2014
- Deputy: Johan Lund Olsen
- Preceded by: Juliane Henningsen
- Succeeded by: Johan Lund Olsen

Chair of the Inuit Circumpolar Council
- Incumbent
- Assumed office 2022
- Preceded by: Dalee Sambo Dorough

Personal details
- Born: 26 September 1978 (age 48) Nuuk, Greenland, Kingdom of Denmark
- Citizenship: Kingdom of Denmark
- Party: Inuit Ataqatigiit (IA)
- Children: Navarana
- Education: University of Copenhagen; University of Greenland
- Profession: Master of Science in Anthropology
- Website: www.ia.gl www.iafolketingimi.dk www.ia.gl/sara-olsvig

Sara Olsvig (born 26 September 1978) is a Greenlandic politician and former leader (2014–2018) of the Inuit Ataqatigiit political party. She occupied one of Greenland's two seats in the Danish Folketing, 15 September 2011 – 15 September 2014.

As of 2022, she is chair of the Inuit Circumpolar Council.

Party political offices
Preceded by Kuupik Kleist	Leader of Inuit Ataqatigiit; 2014–2018	Succeeded by Múte Bourup Egede
