= Palle Christiansen =

Greenlandic politician

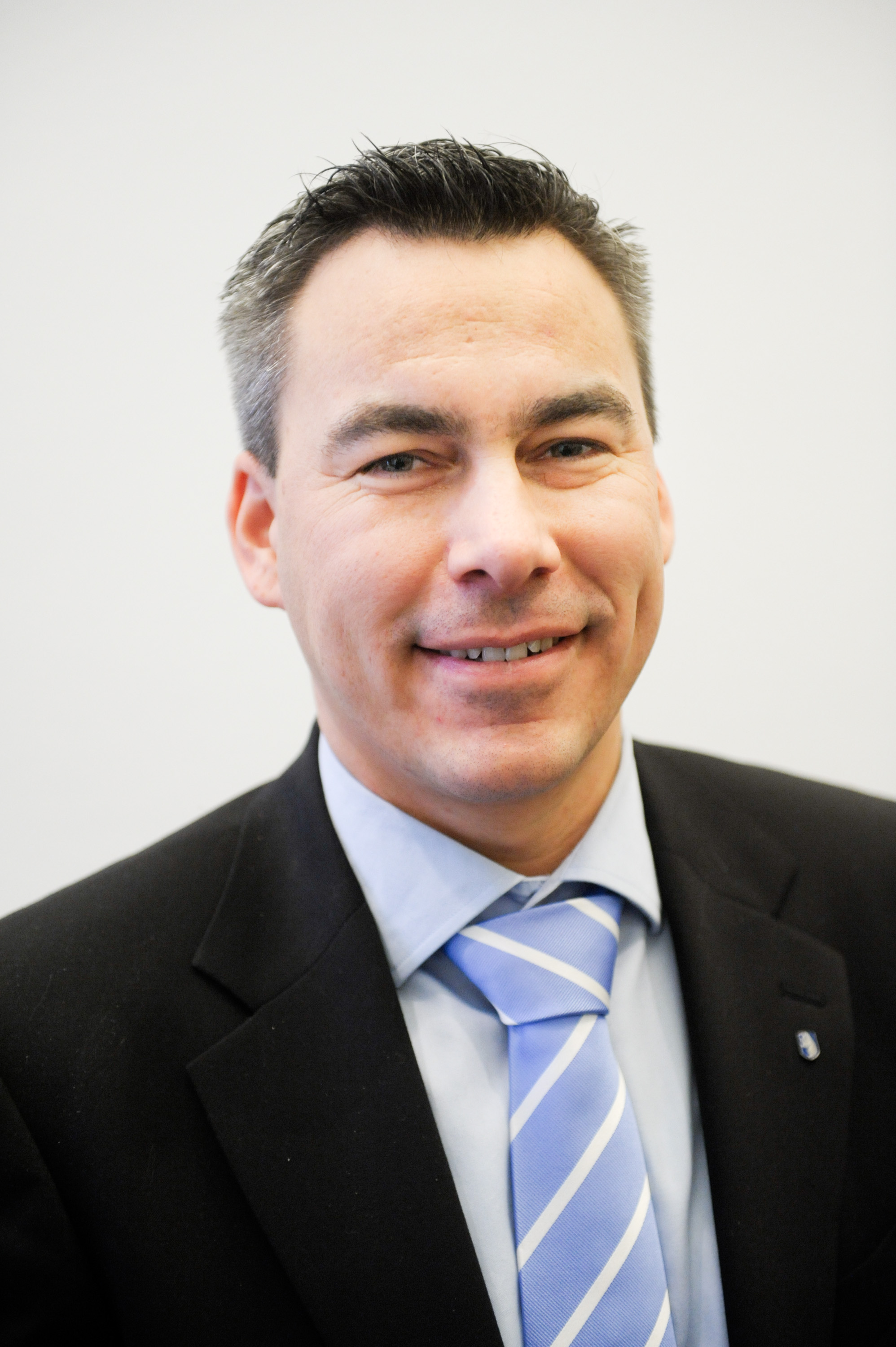
Palle Christiansen (2010).

Palle Christiansen (born 25 June 1973) is a Greenlandic politician. A member of the Democrats and is currently Minister for Education, Science and Nordic Cooperation.
