= Múte Bourup Egede =

Prime Minister of Greenland from 2021 to 2025

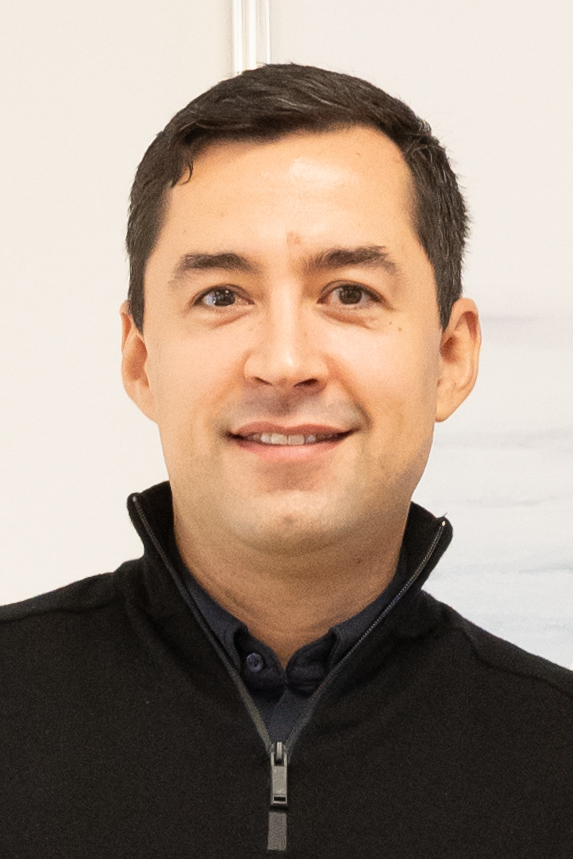
- Egede in 2024

Prime Minister of Greenland
- In office 23 April 2021 – 7 April 2025
- Monarchs: Margrethe II; Frederik X
- Preceded by: Kim Kielsen
- Succeeded by: Jens-Frederik Nielsen

Minister of Foreign Affairs
- Incumbent
- Assumed office 14 April 2026
- Prime Minister: Jens-Frederik Nielsen
- Preceded by: Vivian Motzfeldt
- Acting; 27 September 2021 – 4 April 2022
- Prime Minister: Himself
- Preceded by: Pele Broberg
- Succeeded by: Vivian Motzfeldt

Minister of Finance and Taxation
- Incumbent
- Assumed office 7 April 2025
- Prime Minister: Jens-Frederik Nielsen
- Preceded by: Naaja Nathanielsen

Chairman of Inuit Ataqatigiit
- Incumbent
- Assumed office 1 December 2018
- Preceded by: Sara Olsvig

Minister of Communes, Hamlets, Outer Districts, Infrastructure and Housing (acting)
- In office 2017
- Preceded by: Martha Lund Olsen

Minister for Raw Material and the Labour Market
- In office 2016–2018
- Preceded by: Mimi Karlsen

Member of the Inatsisartut
- Incumbent
- Assumed office May 2015

Personal details
- Born: 11 March 1987 (age 39) Nuuk, Greenland
- Party: Inuit Ataqatigiit
- Spouse: Sara Biilmann Egede
- Children: 3
- Education: University of Greenland (dropped out)

Múte Inequnaaluk Bourup Egede (Greenlandic: [mut͡sːi inɜquˈnaːluk ˈpou̯ʁɔp ˈeːəðə]; born 11 March 1987) is a Greenlandic politician who served as the prime minister of Greenland from 2021 to 2025. He has also served as Chairman of the Inuit Ataqatigiit since December 2018, and a Member of the Inatsisartut since May 2015.

== Early life ==
Múte Inequnaaluk Bourup Egede was born in Nuuk on 11 March 1987. He grew up in Narsaq and was educated in Qaqortoq before studying cultural and social history at the University of Greenland in 2007. He was the vice chairman of the Greenlandic Academic Student Society from 2011 to 2012. He did not finish his studies and dropped out in 2013 to take over the family fodder company started by his father.

== Career ==
In 2007, Egede was a member of the Greenlandic youth parliament, the Inuusuttut Inatsisartui. From 2013 till 2015 he was the chairman of the Inuusuttut Ataqatigiit, the youth wing of Inuit Ataqatigiit.

At the 2015 Danish general election, Egede was a candidate for the Folketing for Inuit Ataqatigiit. He received 2,131 votes, not enough for a seat in parliament.

Between 2016 and 2018, Egede served as Minister for Raw Material and the Labour Market, where he simultaneously – for three months in 2017 – was acting Minister of Communes, Hamlets, Outer Districts, Infrastructure and Housing.

On 1 December 2018 he was elected chair of Inuit Ataqatigiit, succeeding Sara Olsvig. He led the party to the 2021 Greenlandic general elections, where it gained 36.6% of the vote, becoming the largest party in parliament. With 3,380 personal votes, Egede was the candidate with the most personal votes in the elections, receiving upwards of 1,500 more than the sitting prime minister, Kim Kielsen of the Siumut party.

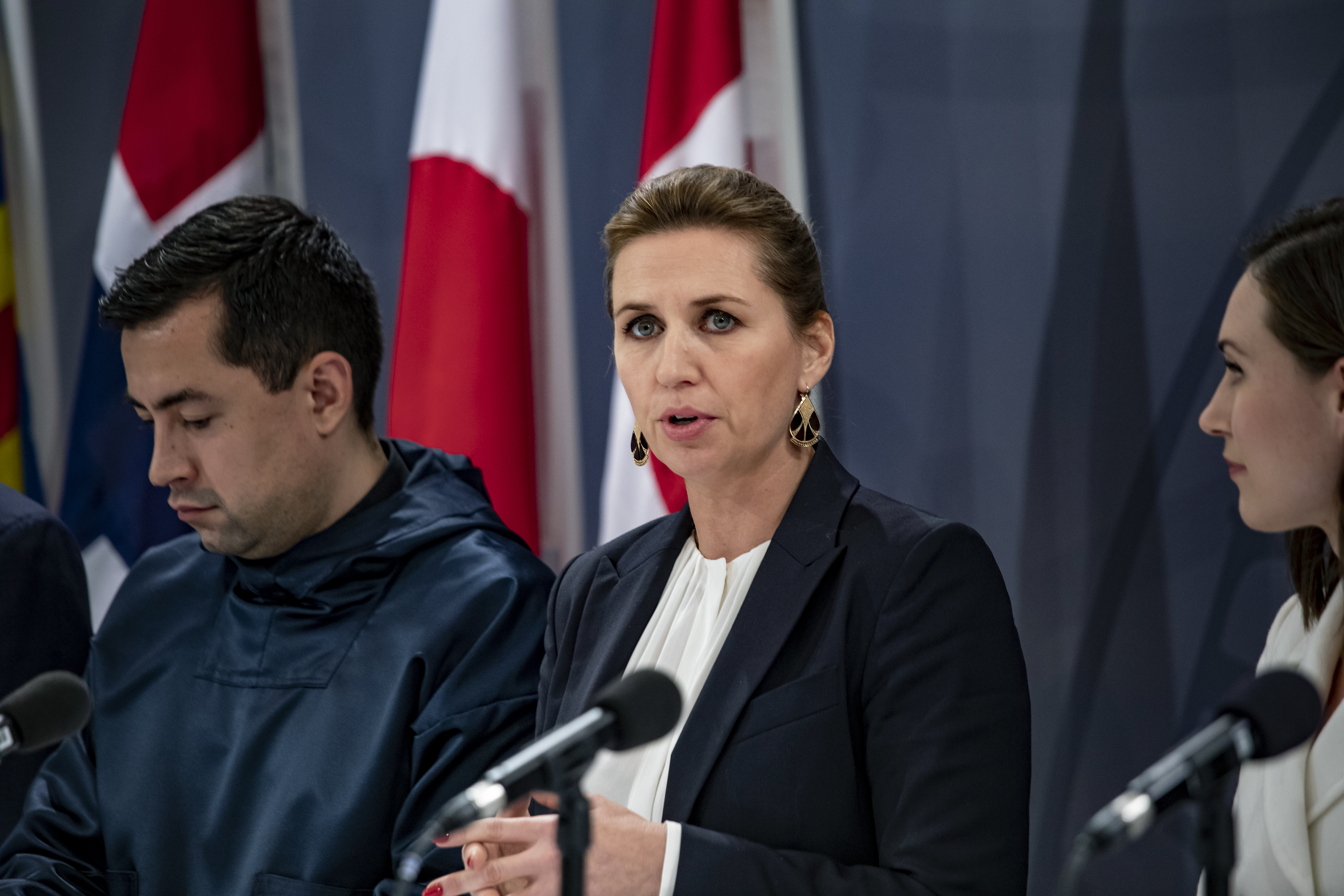
Egede with Mette Frederiksen and Sanna Marin in Copenhagen, 2021

On 16 April it was announced that IA had formed a coalition with Naleraq with a 10-member Naalakkersuisut. Atassut, which holds two seats, announced that while it would not enter a pro-independence coalition they would provide support to the coalition.

Egede was confirmed as Prime Minister of Greenland by the Inatsisartut on 23 April 2021, becoming the country's youngest Prime Minister in history. He formed a new government in April 2022.

In response to the ongoing controversy over the spiral case, Egede accused Denmark of committing genocide in Greenland.

During the 2025 Greenlandic general election, Egede received 3,276 personal votes, losing to Jens-Frederik Nielsen, who received 4,850.

== Political ideology ==
Egede is the chairman of Inuit Ataqatigiit, a democratic socialist political party. He is an advocate for Greenlandic independence.

== Personal life ==
Egede is married to Sara Biilmann Egede, with whom he has one child. He also has two children from a prior relationship.
