= Aqqaluaq B. Egede =

Greenland politician

Aqqaluaq Biilmann Egede (born 1981 in Narsaq) is a Greenlandic politician from Inuit Ataqatigiit. He has been minister for raw materials and justice since April 2022, and he had previously been minister of finance and taxes (2016-2018) and minister of fisheries and prisoners (2021-2022).

== Political career ==
Egede was a member of the municipal council in Narsaq Municipality 2005-2008 and in the merged Kujalleq Municipality 2009–2013. He was deputy to Inatsisartut in 2007 and has been a member of Inatsisartut since the election in 2009 .

When Kuupik Kleist stepped down as chairman of Inuit Ataqatigiit on 31 March 2014, Egede became acting chairman of the party. Egede announced his candidacy for the post of chairman on 16 April 2014, but narrowly lost the election as he received 35 votes at the IA's extraordinary national meeting on 31 May 2014, while Sara Olsvig won with 37 votes.

Egede was Minister of Finance and Taxes in the Government of Kim Kielsen from 27 October 2016 to 15 May 2018. In the First Egede cabinet he was Minister of Fisheries and Traps from 23 April 2021 to 4 April 2022. Upon the formation of the second government of Múte Bourup Egede, the fishing and trapping area went to Siumut, and Egede instead became Minister of Raw Materials and Justice from 5 April 2022.
