= Vivian Motzfeldt =

Greenlandic politician

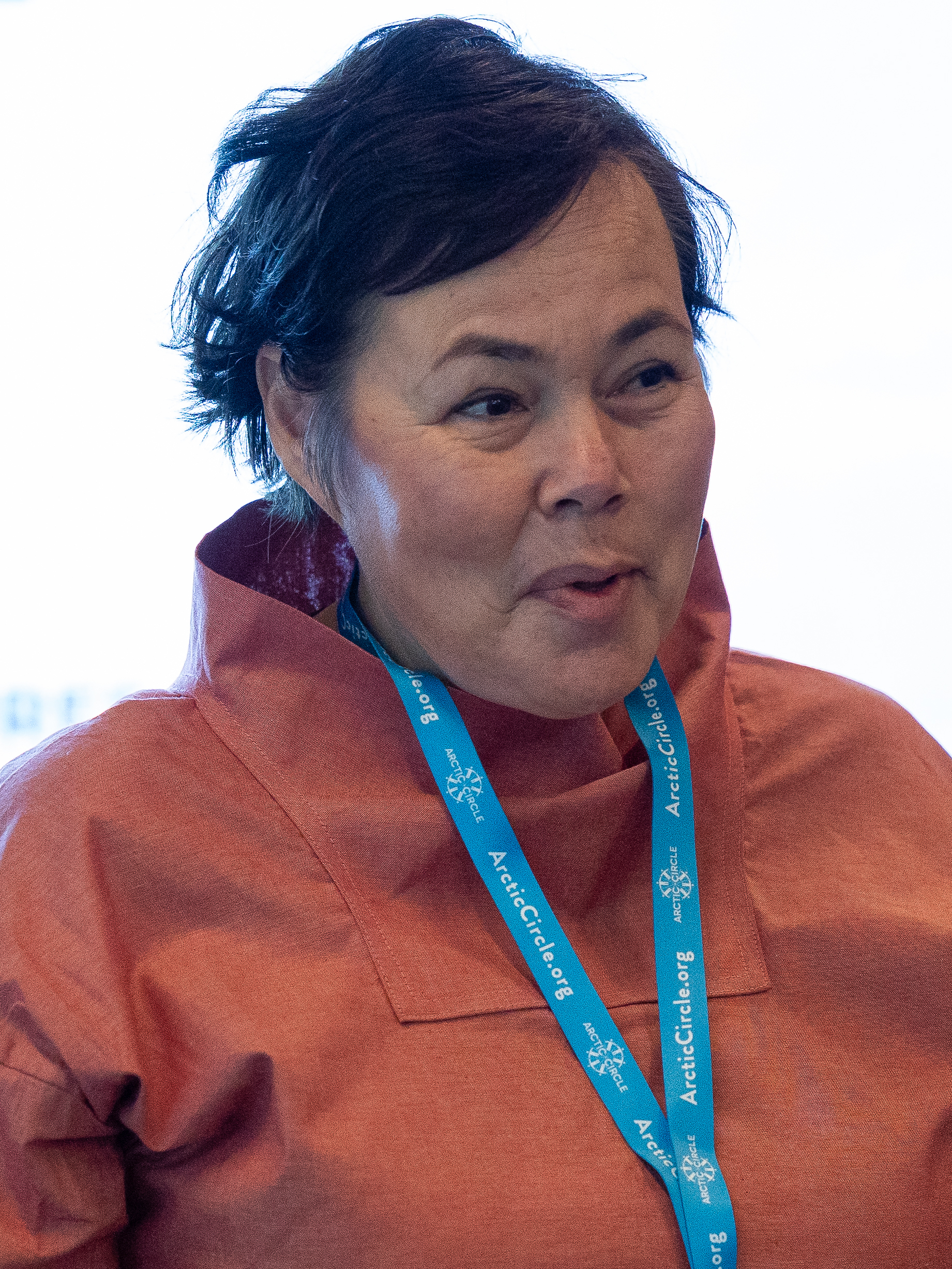
- Motzfeldt in 2024

Leader of Siumut
- In office 12 March 2025 – 29 June 2025
- Preceded by: Erik Jensen
- Succeeded by: Aleqa Hammond

Minister of Foreign Affairs, Business and Trade
- In office 4 April 2022 – 13 March 2026
- Prime Minister: Múte Bourup Egede; Jens-Frederik Nielsen
- Preceded by: Múte Bourup Egede (Foreign Affairs)
- Succeeded by: Múte Bourup Egede

Speaker of the Inatsisartut
- In office 3 October 2018 – 16 April 2021
- Prime Minister: Kim Kielsen
- Preceded by: Hans Enoksen
- Succeeded by: Hans Enoksen

Deputy Leader of Siumut
- In office 2020 – 12 March 2025
- Prime Minister: Kim Kielsen
- Leader: Erik Jensen

Naalakkersuisoq for Foreign Affairs
- In office 2018–2020
- Prime Minister: Kim Kielsen
- Succeeded by: Kim Kielsen

Minister of Education, Culture and Church
- In office 2018–2020
- Prime Minister: Kim Kielsen
- Succeeded by: Ane Lone Bagger

Personal details
- Born: June 10, 1972 (age 54) Upernaviarsuk, Greenland
- Party: Siumut
- Children: 2
- Education: University of Greenland

Vivian Motzfeldt (born 10 June 1972) is a Greenlandic politician who served as the Minister of Foreign Affairs of Greenland from 2022 until 2026. Prior to that, she served as the speaker of the Inatsisartut, the Parliament of Greenland, and the chairwoman of Siumut. In the fifth cabinet of Kim Kielsen, Motzfeldt was the minister of education, culture, church and foreign affairs.

== Early life and education ==
Motzfeldt was born on 10 June 1972. She is descended from the Motzfeldt family, a prominent Dano–Norwegian family. Norwegian-born Peter Hanning Motzfeldt (1774–1835) served as inspector (governor) of Northern Greenland and had several descendants with Cecilie Dalager, granddaughter of Danish Greenland merchant Carl Dalager. Many descendants became active in Greenlandic politics in the 20th century. She is distantly related to the first Greenlandic prime minister, Jonathan Motzfeldt. Motzfeldt is the niece of Josef Motzfeldt, a former member of Greenland’s parliament and later minister of finance and foreign affairs.

== Career ==
At age seven, Vivian moved to a boarding school in Qaqortoq. Each Christmas, she and her siblings went back to their hometown of Upernaviarsuk, an experimental site for agriculture in southern Greenland. She spent Christmas at her childhood home until she was 17, when she went to the United States on an exchange study. She returned to Greenland to study to be a teacher in Nuuk. From 1998 to 2000, she attended the University of Greenland where she studied the cultural and social history of Greenland. She then had a teaching career, first in Nuuk until 2007, and then in Qaqortoq from 2010 to 2014.
