= Naaja Nathanielsen =

Greenlandic politician and feminist

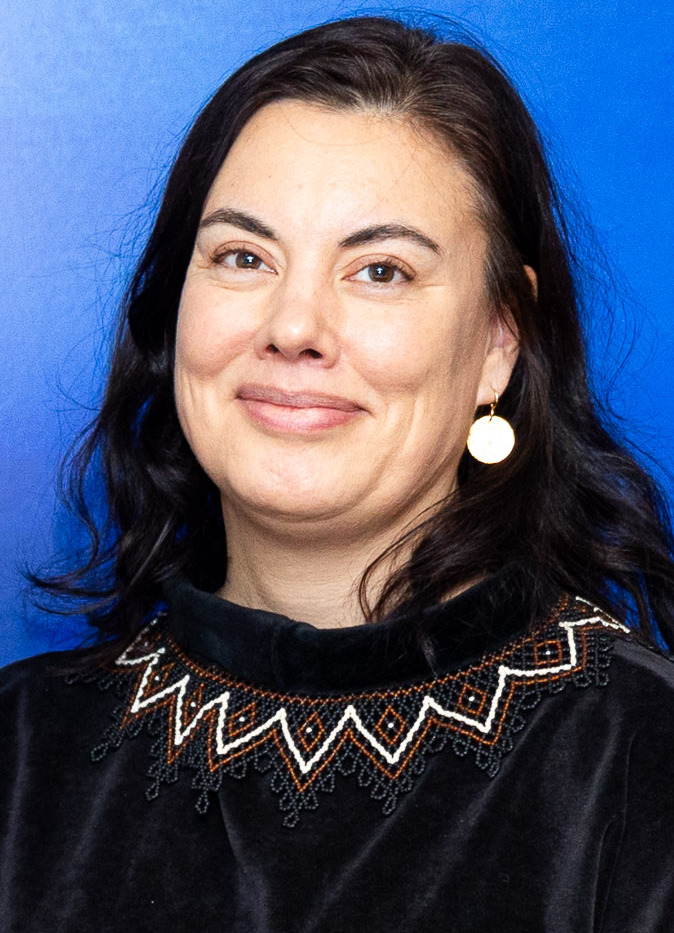
- Nathanielsen in 2023

Minister of Industry, Raw Materials, Mining, Energy, Law Enforcement and Equality
- Incumbent
- Assumed office 2021
- Prime Minister: Múte Bourup Egede; Jens-Frederik Nielsen

Member of the Inatsisartut
- Incumbent
- Assumed office 6 April 2021
- In office 2 June 2009 – 2016

Personal details
- Born: Naaja H. Nathanielsen; 6 December 1975 (age 50)
- Party: Inuit Ataqatigiit

Naaja H. Nathanielsen (born 6 December 1975) is a Greenlandic politician of the Inuit Ataqatigiit party. She was a member of the Inatsisartut (the Greenlandic parliament) from 2009 to 2016, and was re-elected in 2021. She has been the director of Greenland's department of prisons and probation from 2016, and became minister for natural resources in 2021. In her role as minister for natural resources, she banned uranium mining. She is a feminist, and has spoken against domestic violence in the country.

== Life ==
Naaja Nathanielsen was born on 6 December 1975. She served in the Inatsisartut from 2009 to 2016. She was a member of Inuit Ataqatigiit, but became an independent in 2016 before her departure from the legislature; she said she left the party due to not being consulted for policy changes. She ran again for the Inatsisartut in 2021 with the Inuit Ataqatigiit party. She was re-elected.

She has served as the director of the department of prisons and probation since 2016. In 2021, she became the country's minister for natural resources. In her position, she approved an expansion of mining—including to explore the extent of subterranean radioactive elements—but refused to allow uranium mining. She has proposed a total ban on uranium exploitation; such a ban required a bill from the Inatsisartut to be passed, and the ban is now in effect. While she has sought out legal assessments for the ban on uranium mining, she has refused to share them when asked. She also revoked the license of a Chinese company to mine iron near Nuuk, saying the company failed to meet deadlines related to pay and activity.

She is a feminist, and has argued that there are extensive divisions of power in politics as a result of patriarchy. She has argued that violence against women in Greenland is not attributable only to alcohol abuse since violence "is happening to women more than to men". While she believes that there are similarities among all Inuit peoples, she believes that calls for Inuit self-determination in Greenland—such as Greenlandic independence—are problematic, since generalizing an Inuit worldview is not possible, even within the country. She said that independence is the ultimate goal of her work, "in some form or another", while continuing to work toward a "broader or wider deal with Denmark" in the meantime. Ultimately, she said, "self-determination is about freedom from violence and [from] fear of violence".
