= Mimi Karlsen =

Greenlandic politician (born 1957)

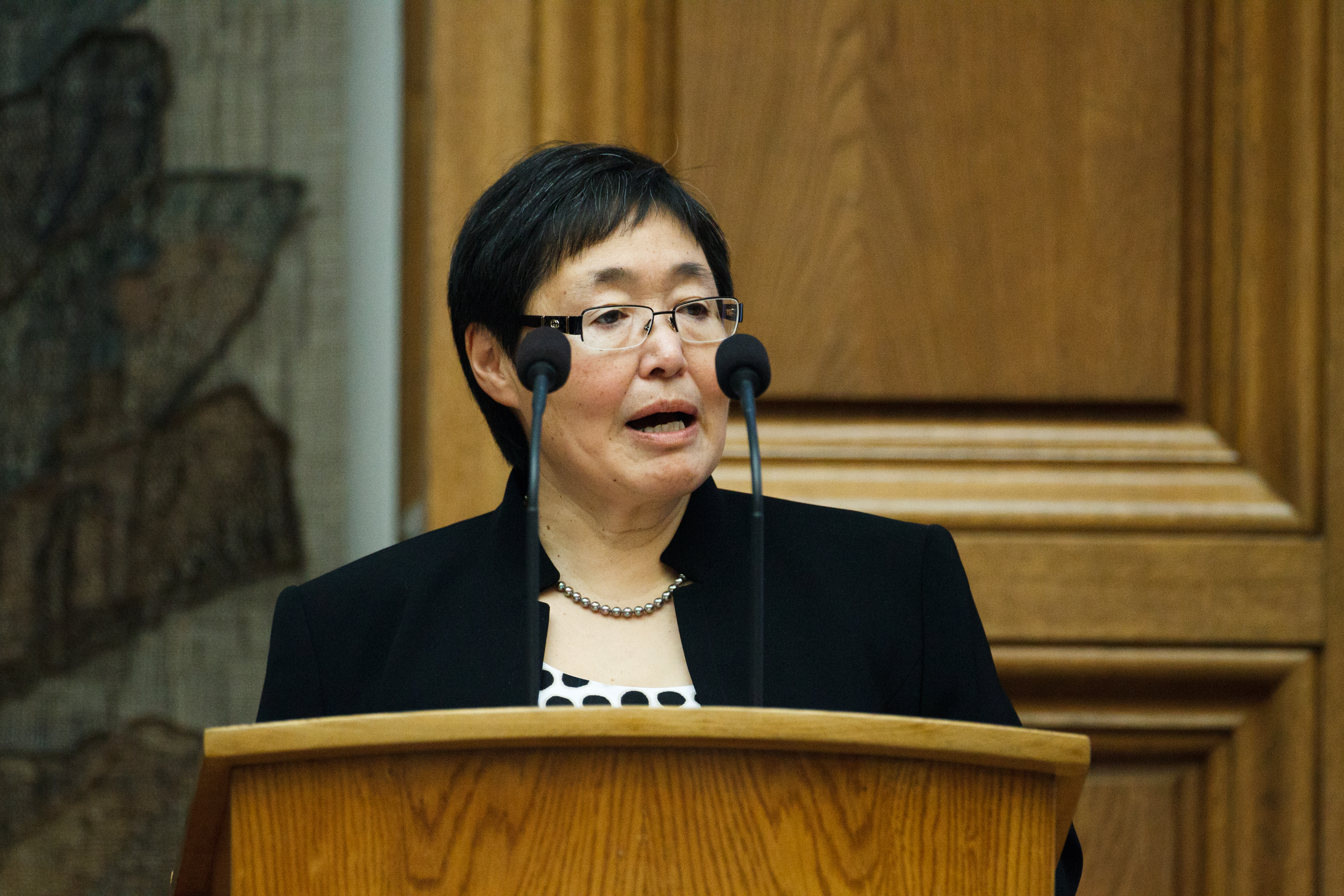
Karlsen in 2011

Mimi Karlsen (born 23 January 1957 in Maniitsoq, Greenland, Kingdom of Denmark) is a Greenlandic politician. A member of the Inuit Ataqatigiit, she was Minister for Culture, Education, Research and Church Affairs.
