= 2024 in Greenland =

- Decades: 2000s; 2010s; 2020s
- See also: Other events of 2024; Timeline of Greenlandic history

Events in the year 2024 in Greenland.

== Incumbents ==
- Monarch – Margrethe II (until 14 January), Frederik X
- High Commissioner – Julie Præst Wilche
- Premier – Múte Bourup Egede

== Events ==
=== June ===
- 24 June – The international airport terminal partially opens in Nuuk.
- 25 June – Google Translate adds support for Kalaallisut.
- 27 June - A polar bear is sighted in Disko Bay near Alluttoq Island, north of Ilulissat.
- 29 June - The yearly Danish royal visit begins. King Frederik and Queen Mary land at Pituffik Space Base and are greeted by Prime Minister Múte Bourup Egede.
- 30 June - Two people are hospitalized after a fire in Paamiut.

=== July ===
- 21 July - Anti-whaling activist Paul Watson, the founder of Sea Shepherd, is arrested shortly after arriving in Nuuk for a refueling stop aboard the vessel John Paul DeJoria by virtue of an Interpol notice requested by Japan in 2012.

== Sports ==
- 2024 Greenlandic Football Championship

== Holidays ==
- 1 January – New Year's Day
- 6 January – Epiphany
- 28 March – Maundy Thursday
- 29 March – Good Friday
- 31 March – Easter Sunday
- 1 April – Easter Monday
- 26 April – Prayer Day
- 9 May – Ascension Day
- 20 May – Whit Monday
- 21 June – Greenland National Day
- 24 December – Christmas Eve
- 25 December – Christmas Day
- 26 December – Christmas Holiday
- 31 December – New Year's Eve
