= 2025 in Greenland =

- Decades: 2000s; 2010s; 2020s
- See also: Other events of 2025; Timeline of Greenlandic history

Events in the year 2025 in Greenland.

== Incumbents ==
- Monarch – Frederik X
- High Commissioner – Julie Præst Wilche
- Premier – Múte Bourup Egede

== Events ==
=== January ===
- 7 January – Donald Trump Jr. arrives in Greenland in what is described as a "personal day-trip", days after his father, US president-elect Donald Trump again expressed interest in purchasing the territory from Denmark.
- January– During a debate in the European Parliament concerning U.S. proposals regarding Greenland, Danish People's Party MEP Anders Vistisen criticized U.S. President Donald Trump's comments about taking control of Greenland. In a speech that later went viral on social media, Vistisen said: "It is not for sale. Let me put it into words you might understand, Mr. Trump: fuck off."

=== February ===
- 4 February – The Inatsisartut passes a bill banning political parties from receiving receiving contributions “from foreign or anonymous contributors” to protect the territory's "political integrity".

=== March ===
- 11 March – 2025 Greenlandic general election: The centre-right opposition Democrats win a plurality of votes in the Inatsisartut.
- 28 March –
  - A coalition government is formed with Jens-Frederik Nielsen of the Democrats as prime minister.
  - US Vice President JD Vance and Second Lady Usha Vance visit the Pituffik Space Base as part of a visit to Greenland that was downsized amid criticism of US intentions towards the territory.

=== April ===
- 1 April – 2025 Greenlandic local elections

=== June ===
- 9 June – The Football Association of Greenland (KAK) receives a letter from Philippe Moggio, the general secretary of CONCACAF, rejecting without explanation the KAK's second application to become the 42nd member of the confederation.
- 14 June – A United Airlines passenger aircraft lands in Nuuk Airport, marking the first commercial flight from the United States to Greenland since 2008.
- 15 June – French president Emmanuel Macron arrives in Greenland as part of efforts to show European support against US intentions to annex the territory.

=== August ===
- 26 August – Denmark summons American charge d'affaires Mark Stroh over allegations of US covert operations to promote separatism and annexation in Greenland.
- 27 August – The Danish and Greenlandic governments issue an official apology for historic abuses against Greenlandic women, including forced contraception.
- 31 August – French foreign minister Jean-Noël Barrot arrives in Greenland as part of efforts to show European support against US intentions to annex the territory.

=== December ===
- 10 December – The Danish government announces an agreement to provide 300,000 kroner ($46,000) in individual compensation beginning in April 2026 to Greenlandic women who were given contraception against their knowledge or consent from 1960 to 1991.
- 21 December – US president Donald Trump appoints Jeff Landry as his special envoy to Greenland.

== Sports ==
- 2025 Greenlandic Football Championship

== Holidays ==
- 1 January – New Year's Day
- 6 January – Epiphany
- 17 April – Maundy Thursday
- 18 April – Good Friday
- 20 April – Easter Sunday
- 21 April – Easter Monday
- 16 May – Prayer Day
- 29 May – Ascension Day
- 9 June – Whit Monday
- 21 June – Greenland National Day
- 24 December – Christmas Eve
- 25 December – Christmas Day
- 26 December – Christmas Holiday
- 31 December – New Year's Eve

== Deaths ==
- 17 September – Hans Enoksen, 69, prime minister (2002–2009), member (since 1987) and speaker (2018) of the Inatsisartut
