= 2021 in Greenland =

- Decades: 2000s; 2010s; 2020s
- See also: Other events of 2021; Timeline of Greenlandic history

Events in the year 2021 in Greenland.

== Incumbents ==
- Monarch – Margrethe II
- High Commissioner – Mikaela Engell
- Premier – Kim Kielsen

== Events ==
Ongoing — COVID-19 pandemic in Greenland

=== April ===
- 6 April – The 2021 Greenlandic general election is won by Inuit Ataqatigiit.
- 6 April – 2021 Greenlandic local elections.
- 10 June – The Solar eclipse of June 10, 2021 is seen as an annular eclipse in parts of Russia, Canada and Greenland.
- 28–29 August – 2021 Arctic X-Prix in Kangerlussuaq.
