= 2026 in Greenland =

- Decades: 2000s; 2010s; 2020s
- See also: Other events of 2026; Timeline of Greenlandic history

Events in the year 2026 in Greenland.

== Incumbents ==
- Monarch – Frederik X
- High Commissioner – Julie Præst Wilche
- Premier – Jens-Frederik Nielsen

== Events ==
=== January ===
- 14 January – French foreign minister Jean-Noël Barrot announces that France will open a consulate in Greenland in February, signaling its rejection of attempts by the United States to acquire the territory through coercion.
- 15 January – French president Emmanuel Macron announces the deployment of additional military forces to Greenland after a Defense Council meeting.
- 17 January – Hands off Greenland protests: Thousands of demonstrators attend rallies in Copenhagen, Denmark, and Nuuk, to protest the proposed takeover by U.S. president Donald Trump.
- 19 January – Operation Arctic Endurance: Denmark announces that it will send "a substantial number" of troops to Greenland in response to threats from president Trump.

=== February ===
- 6 February – The governments of Canada and France announce they will open new consulates in Nuuk, to reinforce support for Denmark against US president Donald Trump's threats to annex the territory.
- 18 February – King Frederik X arrives in Nuuk as part of a three-day visit to Greenland.

=== March ===
- 9 March – NATO conducts military drills in Greenland involving over 25,000 troops from 14 nations including Denmark and the United States in an effort to de-escalate tensions over efforts by Trump to purchase the island. The exercise will last until March 19.

=== April ===
- 16 April – A commercial aircraft from Nuuk lands at the newly inaugurated Qaqortoq Airport in Qaqortoq, Greenland amidst efforts by Trump to purchase the island.

=== May ===
- 21 May – The United States inaugurates a new consulate in Nuuk, amidst the Trump administration's focus on the Arctic and tensions over efforts to purchase it.

=== August ===
- 12 August – A total solar eclipse occurs at the Moon's descending node of the orbit in North America and Europe. The total eclipse passes over the Arctic, Greenland, Iceland, the Atlantic Ocean, northeastern Portugal and northern Spain.

=== September ===
- 19 September – The United States and Denmark reach an agreement on security guarantees over Greenland.
- 22 September – Denmark, Greenland, and the United States sign an agreement expanding U.S. military access to the country, permitting new defence areas and a missile defence system while reaffirming Greenland's self-determination and amending the 1951 defence agreement.

== Holidays ==
- 1 January – New Year's Day
- 6 January – Epiphany
- 2 April – Maundy Thursday
- 3 April – Good Friday
- 5 April – Easter Sunday
- 5 April – Easter Monday
- 1 May – Prayer Day
- 14 May – Ascension Day
- 25 May – Whit Monday
- 21 June – Greenland National Day
- 24 December – Christmas Eve
- 25 December – Christmas Day
- 26 December – Christmas Holiday
- 31 December – New Year's Eve
