= 2020 in Greenland =

- Decades: 2000s; 2010s; 2020s
- See also: Other events of 2020; Timeline of Greenlandic history

Events in the year 2020 in Greenland.

== Incumbents ==
- Monarch – Margrethe II
- High Commissioner – Mikaela Engell
- Premier – Kim Kielsen

== Events ==
Ongoing — COVID-19 pandemic in Greenland

=== April ===
- 16 March – Greenland reports its first confirmed case of COVID-19, in Nuuk.
- 14 September – Satellite imagery shows that a big chunk of ice shattered into many small pieces from the last remaining ice shelf in Nioghalvfjerdsfjorden, Greenland.

== Sports ==
- The 2020 Greenlandic Football Championship was cancelled due to the COVID-19 pandemic.

== Deaths ==
- 21 July – Suka K. Frederiksen, 55, Greenlandic politician, Foreign Minister (2017–2018)
- 15 October – Arnannguaq Høegh, 63, Greenlandic artist
