= 2022 in Greenland =

- Decades: 2000s; 2010s; 2020s
- See also: Other events of 2022; Timeline of Greenlandic history

Events in the year 2022 in Greenland.

== Incumbents ==
- Monarch – Margrethe II
- High Commissioner – Julie Præst Wilche
- Premier – Múte Bourup Egede

== Events ==
Ongoing — COVID-19 pandemic in Greenland

=== June ===
- 14 June – Whisky War: The Danish Foreign Ministry announces that it has reached a deal with Canada to divide the long-disputed Hans Island in the Arctic in half between Canada's Nunavut territory and Greenland.

== Sports ==
- 18 July – 13 August: 2022 Greenlandic Football Championship

== Deaths ==
- 26 June – Thue Christiansen, 82, Greenlandic visual artist and politician, designer of the flag of Greenland and minister of education (1979–1983)
- 4 September – Hendrik Nielsen, 80, Greenlandic politician, MP (1979–1991)
