= 2011 in Greenland =

- Decades: 1990s; 2000s; 2010s; 2020s
- See also: Other events of 2011; Timeline of Greenlandic history

Events in the year 2011 in Greenland.

== Incumbents ==
- Monarch – Margrethe II
- High Commissioner – Søren Hald Møller (until 31 January); Mikaela Engell; onwards
- Premier – Kuupik Kleist

== Events ==
- January 11: The Arctic Sun rises over Ilulissat, two days earlier than expected. A possible explanation is alterations in atmospheric refraction or inversion from ice crystals that may or may not be the result of global warming.
- March 9: Ice loss from Antarctica and Greenland has accelerated over the past 20 years, according to new research, and will soon become the biggest driver of sea level rise.
- May 29: 3 Greenpeace activists successfully evade a Danish warship to scale an oil rig off the coast of Greenland, attempting to begin deepwater drilling in the arctic.

== Sports ==
- 2011 Greenlandic Men's Football Championship.
