= 2012 in Greenland =

- Decades: 1990s; 2000s; 2010s; 2020s
- See also: Other events of 2012; Timeline of Greenlandic history

Events in the year 2012 in Greenland.

== Incumbents ==
- Monarch – Margrethe II
- High Commissioner – Mikaela Engell
- Premier – Kuupik Kleist

== Events ==
- December: The KNR2 television channel is established.

== Sports ==
- 2012 Greenlandic Men's Football Championship.
