= 2009 in Greenland =

- Decades: 1980s; 1990s; 2000s; 2010s; 2020s
- See also: Other events of 2009; Timeline of Greenlandic history

Events in the year 2009 in Greenland.

== Incumbents ==
- Monarch – Margrethe II
- High Commissioner – Søren Hald Møller
- Premier – Hans Enoksen (until 12 June); Kuupik Kleist onwards

== Events ==
- June 2: The Community of the People wins Greenland's parliamentary election.
- June 21: Self-rule is introduced following a 2008 referendum.

== Sports ==
- 2009 Greenlandic Men's Football Championship.
