= 2024 in North America =

The following lists events that happened during 2024 in North America.

== Incumbents ==
=== Northern America ===
==== Bermuda ====
(Bermuda)

- Monarch: Charles III (2022–present)
- Governor: Rena Lalgie (2020–present)
- Premier: Edward David Burt (2017–present)

==== Canada ====
(Canada)

- Monarch – Charles III (2022–present)
- Governor General – Mary Simon (2021–present)
- Prime Minister – Justin Trudeau (2015–2025)

==== Greenland ====
(Greenland)

- Monarch – Margrethe II (1972–2024), Frederik X (2024–present)
- High Commissioner – Julie Præst Wilche (2022–present)
- Premier – Múte Bourup Egede (2021–2025)

==== Saint Pierre and Miquelon ====
(Saint Pierre and Miquelon)

==== United States ====
(United States)

- President: Joe Biden (2021–2025)
- Vice President: Kamala Harris (2021–2025)

=== Middle America ===
==== Mexico ====
(Mexico)

- President: Andrés Manuel López Obrador (2018–2024); Claudia Sheinbaum (2024–present)

== Events ==
=== Elections ===
- 2 June:
  - 2024 Mexican general election
  - 2024 Mexican local elections
- October 19 – 2024 British Columbia general election
- October 21 – 2024 New Brunswick general election
- October 28 – 2024 Saskatchewan general election
- November 5 – United States, President, Senate (Class 1) and House of Representatives

== See also ==
- List of state leaders in North America in 2024
