= 2010 in Greenland =

- Decades: 1990s; 2000s; 2010s; 2020s
- See also: Other events of 2010; Timeline of Greenlandic history

Events in the year 2010 in Greenland.

== Incumbents ==
- Monarch – Margrethe II
- High Commissioner – Søren Hald Møller
- Premier – Kuupik Kleist

== Events ==
- May 3: The European Commission proposes rules for imports of fishery products from Greenland into the EU.
- August 6: American scientists announce an ice sheet has broken from Greenland's Petermann Glacier.
- August 24: Cairn Energy discovers gas off the coast of Greenland, amid protests from Greenpeace demanding it halt its oil operations.

== Sports ==
- 2010 Greenlandic Men's Football Championship.

== Deaths ==
- October 28: Jonathan Motzfeldt, 72, politician, Prime Minister (1979–1991; 1997–2002), brain hemorrhage.
