= 2015 in Greenland =

- Decades: 1990s; 2000s; 2010s; 2020s
- See also: Other events of 2015; Timeline of Greenlandic history

Events in the year 2015 in Greenland.

== Incumbents ==
- Monarch – Margrethe II
- High Commissioner – Mikaela Engell
- Premier – Kim Kielsen

== Events ==
- May 27: The parliament of Greenland unanimously votes to legalize same-sex marriage by 1 October, 2015.
- November 15: Due to the June Danish general elections, the parliamentary procedure regarding same-sex marriage had to start over and the new Venstre Government put an identical bill on the agenda for its first reading.
