= 2008 in Greenland =

- Decades: 1980s; 1990s; 2000s; 2010s; 2020s
- See also: Other events of 2008; Timeline of Greenlandic history

Events in the year 2008 in Greenland.

== Incumbents ==
- Monarch – Margrethe II
- High Commissioner – Søren Hald Møller
- Premier – Hans Enoksen

== Events ==
- August 1: A total solar eclipse is visible from Greenland.
- November 10: Reports surface that a United States nuclear weapon was lost somewhere in the ice after the January 21, 1968 crash of a B-52 Stratofortress outside Thule Air Base.
- November 26: The Greenlandic self-government referendum passes with 75% approval.

== Sports ==
- 2008 Greenlandic Men's Football Championship.
