= 2013 in Greenland =

- Decades: 1990s; 2000s; 2010s; 2020s
- See also: Other events of 2013; Timeline of Greenlandic history

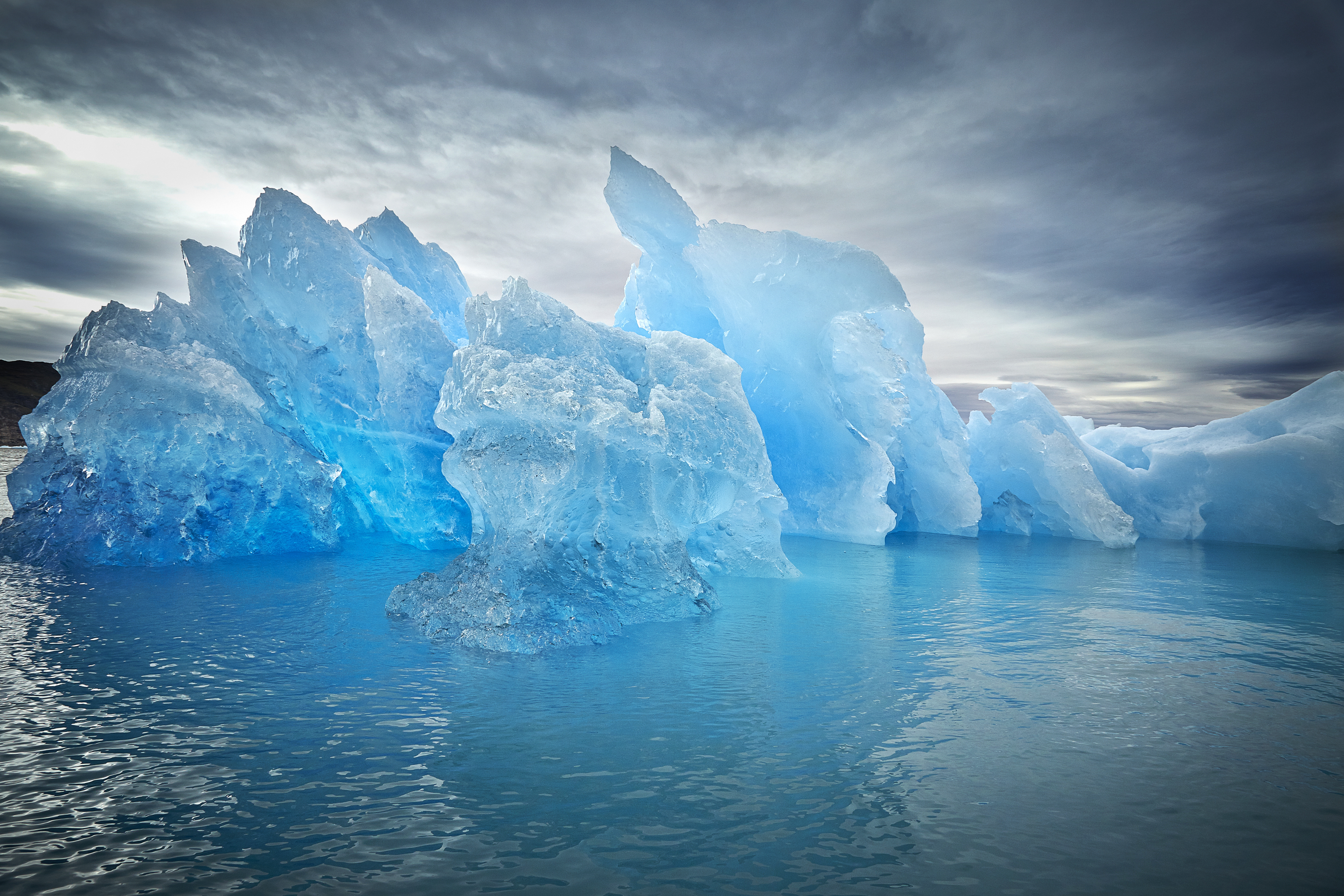

Events in the year 2013 in Greenland.

== Incumbents ==
- Monarch – Margrethe II
- High Commissioner – Mikaela Engell
- Premier – Kuupik Kleist (until April 5) Aleqa Hammond; onwards

== Events ==
- March 12: Voters in Greenland go to the polls for a parliamentary election.
- March 13: After her Siumut party wins the parliamentary election, Aleqa Hammond is set to become first female Prime Minister of Greenland.
- August 30: Scientists discover an 800km long canyon that is up to 800m deep in places beneath the ice sheet that covers Greenland.
