= 2007 in Greenland =

- Decades: 1980s; 1990s; 2000s; 2010s; 2020s
- See also: Other events of 2007; Timeline of Greenlandic history

Events in the year 2007 in Greenland.

== Incumbents ==
- Monarch – Margrethe II
- High Commissioner – Søren Hald Møller
- Premier – Hans Enoksen

== Events ==
- August 12: Denmark sends a scientific team to the Arctic to try to establish that the Lomonosov Ridge is an extension of Greenland so it can claim sovereignty over oil reserves.

== Sports ==
- 2007 Greenlandic Men's Football Championship.

== Deaths ==
- November 25: Agnethe Davidsen, 60, politician, Mayor of Nuuk (1993–2007).
