= 2017 in Greenland =

- Decades: 1990s; 2000s; 2010s; 2020s
- See also: Other events of 2017; Timeline of Greenlandic history

Events in the year 2017 in Greenland.

== Incumbents ==
- Monarch – Margrethe II
- High Commissioner – Mikaela Engell
- Premier – Kim Kielsen

== Events ==
April 4: 2017 Greenlandic local elections

August 5-12: 2017 Greenlandic Football Championship

September 30: Air France Flight 066
