= 2023 in Greenland =

- Decades: 2000s; 2010s; 2020s
- See also: Other events of 2023; Timeline of Greenlandic history

Events in the year 2023 in Greenland.

== Incumbents ==
- Monarch – Margrethe II
- High Commissioner – Julie Præst Wilche
- Premier – Múte Bourup Egede

== Events ==
=== May ===
- 30 May – Peter Olsen resigns as Minister for Education, Culture, Sports and Church.

=== September ===
- 16 September – a rock-ice avalanche started a tsunami and seiche that swept through Dickson Fjord for the next 9 days.
- 25 September – Múte Bourup Egede carried out a cabinet reshuffle.

== Sports ==
- 10 – 15 August: 2023 Greenlandic Football Championship
