= 2025 in North America =

The following lists events that will happen during 2025 in North America.

== Incumbents ==
=== Northern America ===
==== Bermuda ====
(Bermuda)

- Monarch: Charles III (2022–present)
- Governor: Rena Lalgie (2020–present)
- Premier: Edward David Burt (2017–present)

==== Canada ====
(Canada)

- Monarch – Charles III (2022–present)
- Governor General – Mary Simon (2021–present)
- Prime Minister –
  - Justin Trudeau (2015–2025)
  - Mark Carney (2025–present)

==== Greenland ====
(Greenland)

- Monarch – Frederik X (2024–present)
- High Commissioner – Julie Præst Wilche (2022–present)
- Premier – Múte Bourup Egede (2021–2025)

==== Saint Pierre and Miquelon ====
(Saint Pierre and Miquelon)

==== United States ====
(United States)

- President:
  - Joe Biden (2021–2025)
  - Donald J. Trump (2025–present)
- Vice President:
  - Kamala Harris (2021–2025)
  - JD Vance (2025–present)

=== Middle America ===
==== Mexico ====
(Mexico)

- President: Claudia Sheinbaum (2024–present)

== Events ==
=== Elections ===
- July 15 – 2025 Nova Scotia general election
- October 20 – 2025 Canadian federal election
- November 3 – 2025 Yukon general election
- November 24 – 2025 Newfoundland and Labrador general election
- November 5 – 2025 New Jersey and Virginia gubernatorial election

== See also ==
- List of state leaders in North America in 2025
