= 2006 in Greenland =

- Decades: 1980s; 1990s; 2000s; 2010s; 2020s
- See also: Other events of 2006; Timeline of Greenlandic history

Events in the year 2006 in Greenland.

== Incumbents ==
- Monarch – Margrethe II
- High Commissioner – Søren Hald Møller
- Premier – Hans Enoksen

== Events ==
- October: The Qorlortorsuaq Dam is opened in the Nanortalik district of the Kujalleq municipality.

== Sports ==
- 2006 Greenlandic Men's Football Championship.
