= 2014 in Greenland =

- Decades: 1990s; 2000s; 2010s; 2020s
- See also: Other events of 2014; Timeline of Greenlandic history

Events in the year 2014 in Greenland.

== Incumbents ==
- Monarch – Margrethe II
- High Commissioner – Mikaela Engell
- Premier – Aleqa Hammond (until September 30); Kim Kielsen onwards

== Events ==
- August 3: Danish scientists find a genetic variant among Greenlanders that dramatically increases the risk of developing type-2 diabetes.
- November 28: The social-democratic Siumut narrowly retains a government-forming plurality of votes in the Greenlandic general election, tying with leftist opposition Inuit Ataqatigiit for number of parliament seats.
