= 2019 in Greenland =

- Decades: 1990s; 2000s; 2010s; 2020s
- See also: Other events of 2019; Timeline of Greenlandic history

Events in the year 2019 in Greenland.

== Incumbents ==
- Monarch – Margrethe II
- High Commissioner – Mikaela Engell
- Premier – Kim Kielsen

== Events ==
August 5-11: 2019 Greenlandic Football Championship

== Deaths ==
- 3 May – Emilie Lennert, politician (b. 1931).
