= 2016 in Greenland =

- Decades: 1990s; 2000s; 2010s; 2020s
- See also: Other events of 2016; Timeline of Greenlandic history

Events in the year 2016 in Greenland.

== Incumbents ==
- Monarch – Margrethe II
- High Commissioner – Mikaela Engell
- Premier – Kim Kielsen

== Events ==
- August 12: Scientists say Greenland sharks are now known to be the longest-living vertebrates on Earth, after researchers at the University of Copenhagen, using radiocarbon dating, determined the ages of 28 of the animals, and estimated that one female was about 400 years old. The former vertebrate record-holder was a Bowhead whale estimated to be 211 years old.
- August 31: The oldest fossil (stromatolite) that had life is discovered in the melting snow at the Isua Greenstone Belt of Greenland.
