= 2018 in Greenland =

- Decades: 1990s; 2000s; 2010s; 2020s
- See also: Other events of 2018; Timeline of Greenlandic history

Events in the year 2018 in Greenland.

== Incumbents ==
- Monarch – Margrethe II
- High Commissioner – Mikaela Engell
- Premier – Kim Kielsen
- Speaker of the Inatsisartut – Hans Enoksen

== Events ==
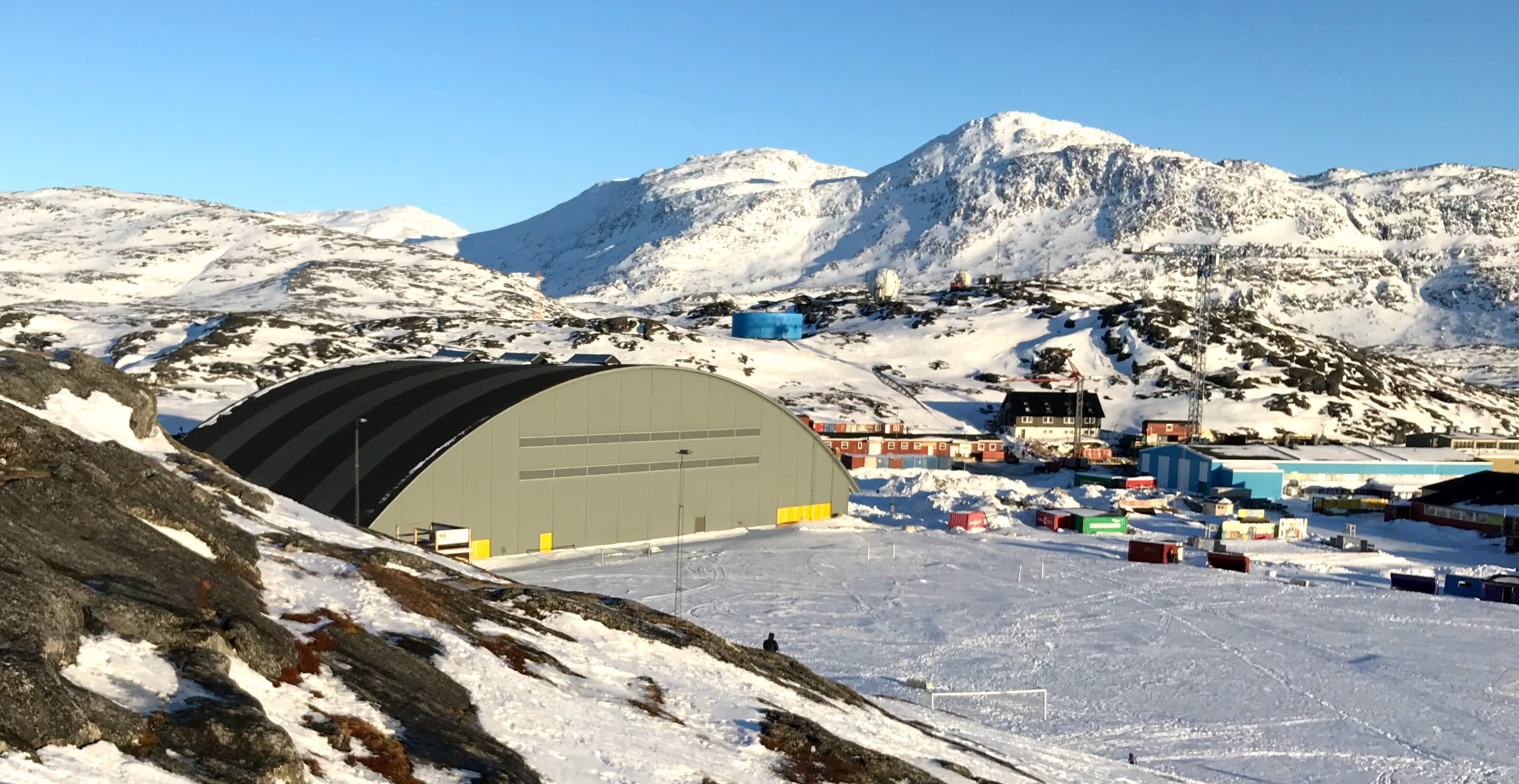
Inussivik, the Sports Arena in Nuuk, venue for the 2018 Pan American Men's Handball Championship

- 24 April – 2018 Greenlandic general election

=== Sports ===
- 16 to 24 June – Greenland hosted the 2018 Pan American Men's Handball Championship

== Deaths ==
- 9 July – Hans-Pavia Rosing, politician and civil servant (b. 1948).
- 2 August – Ûssarĸak K'ujaukitsoĸ, Inuk politician and human rights activist, member of the Inatsisartut (b. 1948).
