= Peter Lauritzen =

High Commissioner of Greenland from 2002 to 2005

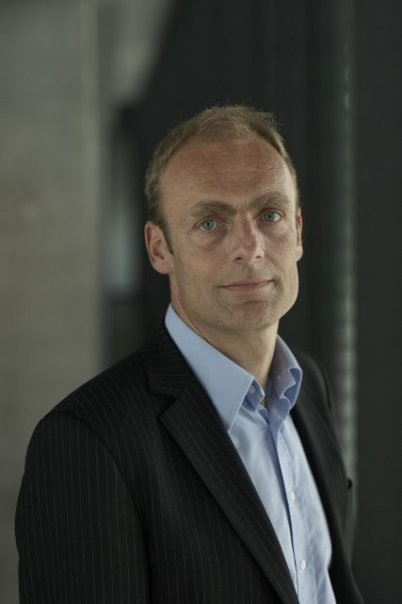

4th High Commissioner of Greenland
- In office 1 April 2002 – 30 March 2005
- Monarch: Margrethe II
- Preceded by: Gunnar Martens
- Succeeded by: Søren Hald Møller

Peter Lauritzen (born 8 December 1959 in Århus) is a Danish civil servant.

He was the fourth High Commissioner of Greenland, and held the post from 1 April 2002 to 30 March 2005.

From 1 January 2007, he became director of Roskilde Universitetscenter, taking over from Lars Kirdan. He has an MA in political science and MA in comparative studies, and was formerly ministerial secretary for Prime Minister Poul Nyrup Rasmussen, and research assistant and lecturer at Københavns Universitet.
