= Steen Spore =

High Commissioner of Greenland from 1992 to 1995

2nd High Commissioner of Greenland
- In office 1 August 1992 – 1 July 1995
- Preceded by: Torbe Hede Pedersen
- Succeeded by: Gunnar Martens

Steen Spore (27 April 1938 – 13 August 2022) was a Danish official who was the second High Commissioner of Greenland, holding this position from 1 August 1992 to 1 July 1995. After his departure, he became a 1st order knight of the Order of the Dannebrog.
