= Gunnar Martens =

High Commissioner of Greenland from 1995 to 2002

3rd High Commissioner in Greenland
- In office 1 July 1995 – 31 March 2002
- Preceded by: Steen Spore
- Succeeded by: Peter Lauritzen

Gunnar Martens (born 1940) is a Danish official who was the third High Commissioner of Greenland, holding this position from 1 July 1995 to 31 March 2002. He became a first class knight of the Order of the Dannebrog in 2001.
