= 2024 Greenlandic Football Championship =

2024 Angutit inersimasut GM
- Season: 2024
- Dates: 3 August 2024 – 10 August 2024
- Champions: B-67 Nuuk (15th title)
- Matches played: 15

The 2024 Angutit inersimasut GM is the 54th edition of the Greenlandic Football Championship. The final round was held in Qeqertarsuaq from 3 to 10 August.

== Teams ==
Location of teams of the 2024 Greenlandic Football Championship.

For the season, there was no qualifying tournament for the final tournament, with all teams being selected for this season's participation. The tournament was hosted in the city of Qeqertarsuaq, home of G-44 Qeqertarsuaq which was celebrating the 80th anniversary of its founding. Shortly before the tournament started the teams of FC Malamuk, Nagtoralik-45 and Narsaq-85 had to withdraw due to transportation difficulties.

Team	City
FC Aqisseq Kangaatsiaq	Kangaatsiaq
B-67 Nuuk	Nuuk
G-44 Qeqertarsuaq	Qeqertarsuaq
Inuit Timersoqatigiiffiat-79	Nuuk
Nagdlunguaq-48	Ilulissat
Siumut Amerdlok Kunuk	Sisimiut
UB-83 Upernavik	Upernavik

== Final round ==
=== Group 1 ===
Pos	Team	Pld	W	D	L	GF	GA	GD	Pts		G44	I79	U83	FCA	N85
1	G-44 Qeqertarsuaq (H)	3	2	1	0	13	0	+13	7	Advanced to semi-final		0–0	5–0	8–0	
2	Inuit Timersoqatigiiffiat-79	3	2	1	0	7	1	+6	7	Advanced to semi-final			1–0		
3	UB-83 Upernavik	3	1	0	2	3	7	−4	3	Advanced to fifth place match					
4	Aqisseq Kangaatsiaq	3	0	0	3	2	17	−15	0	Advanced to fifth place semi-final		1–6	1–3		
5	Narsaq-85	0	0	0	0	0	0	0	0	Withdrew					

(H) Hosts
3 August 2024
15:00

G-44 Qeqertarsuaq	5–0	UB-83 Upernavik

Qeqertarsuaq Stadium, Qeqertarsuaq
3 August 2024
19:00

Aqisseq Kangaatsiaq	1–6	Inuit Timersoqatigiiffiat-79

Qeqertarsuaq Stadium, Qeqertarsuaq

5 August 2024
13:00

G-44 Qeqertarsuaq	8–0	Aqisseq Kangaatsiaq

Qeqertarsuaq Stadium, Qeqertarsuaq
5 August 2024
17:00

Inuit Timersoqatigiiffiat-79	1–0	UB-83 Upernavik

Qeqertarsuaq Stadium, Qeqertarsuaq

6 August 2024
15:00

Aqisseq Kangaatsiaq	1–3	UB-83 Upernavik

Qeqertarsuaq Stadium, Qeqertarsuaq
6 August 2024
19:00

G-44 Qeqertarsuaq	0–0	Inuit Timersoqatigiiffiat-79

Qeqertarsuaq Stadium, Qeqertarsuaq

=== Group 2 ===
Pos	Team	Pld	W	D	L	GF	GA	GD	Pts		B67	N48	SAK	N45	FCM
1	B-67 Nuuk	2	1	1	0	14	1	+13	4	Advanced to semi-final					
2	Nagdlunguaq-48	2	1	1	0	6	1	+5	4	Advanced to semi-final	1–1		5–0		
3	Siumut Amerdlok Kunuk	2	0	0	2	0	18	−18	0	Advanced to fifth place semi-final	0–13				
4	Nagtoralik-45	0	0	0	0	0	0	0	0	Withdrew					
5	FC Malamuk	0	0	0	0	0	0	0	0	Withdrew					

3 August 2024
13:00

Nagdlunguaq-48	5–0	Siumut Amerdlok Kunuk

Qeqertarsuaq Stadium, Qeqertarsuaq

5 August 2024
19:00

Siumut Amerdlok Kunuk	0–13	B-67 Nuuk

Qeqertarsuaq Stadium, Qeqertarsuaq

6 August 2024
17:00

Nagdlunguaq-48	1–1	B-67 Nuuk

Qeqertarsuaq Stadium, Qeqertarsuaq

== Placement play-off matches ==
=== Bracket ===
Fifth place semi-final
8 August 2024 — Qeqertarsuaq
Aqisseq Kangaatsiaq	3
Siumut Amerdlok Kunuk	4

Fifth place match
10 August 2024 — Qeqertarsuaq
UB-83 Upernavik	0
Siumut Amerdlok Kunuk	2

=== Fifth place semi-final ===
8 August 2024
13:00

Siumut Amerdlok Kunuk	4–3	Aqisseq Kangaatsiaq

Qeqertarsuaq Stadium, Qeqertarsuaq

=== Fifth place match ===
10 August 2024
13:00

UB-83 Upernavik	0–2	Siumut Amerdlok Kunuk

Qeqertarsuaq Stadium, Qeqertarsuaq

== Knockout stage ==
=== Bracket ===
Semi-finals
8 August — Qeqertarsuaq
B-67 Nuuk	6
Inuit Timersoqatigiiffiat-79	0
8 August — Qeqertarsuaq
G-44 Qeqertarsuaq	0
Nagdlunguaq-48	2

Final
10 August — Qeqertarsuaq
B-67 Nuuk	3
Nagdlunguaq-48	1
Third place
10 August — Qeqertarsuaq
Inuit Timersoqatigiiffiat-79	2
G-44 Qeqertarsuaq	1

=== Semi-finals ===
8 August 2024
16:00

B-67 Nuuk	6–0	Inuit Timersoqatigiiffiat-79
Hermann 7'; Frederiksen 17'; Kreutzmann 35'; Nielsen 42'; Berthelsen 72', 89'

Qeqertarsuaq Stadium, Qeqertarsuaq
8 August 2024
19:00

G-44 Qeqertarsuaq	0–2	Nagdlunguaq-48
		Sandgreen 6' (pen.); Bronlund 59'

Qeqertarsuaq Stadium, Qeqertarsuaq

=== Third place match ===
10 August 2024
15:00

G-44 Qeqertarsuaq	1–2	Inuit Timersoqatigiiffiat-79
Eriksen 4'		Kleist 8'; Thomsen 57'

Qeqertarsuaq Stadium, Qeqertarsuaq

=== Final ===
10 August 2024
18:00

B-67 Nuuk	3–1	Nagdlunguaq-48
Frederiksen 52'; Kreutzmann 75'; Philbert 80'		Gundel-Collin 86' (o.g.)

Qeqertarsuaq Stadium, Qeqertarsuaq

== See also ==
- Football in Greenland
- Football Association of Greenland
- Greenland national football team
- Greenlandic Football Championship
