= 2025 Greenlandic Football Championship =

2025 Angutit Inersimasut Isikkamik arsarluni NP
- Season: 2025
- Dates: 23 June – 3 August 2025
- Champions: B-67 Nuuk (16th title)

The 2025 Angutit Inersimasut Isikkamik arsarluni NP is the 55th edition of the Greenlandic Football Championship. The final round was held in Nuuk from 29 July to 3 August. It was won by B-67 Nuuk for the sixteenth time in its history.

== Qualifying stage ==
=== North Greenland and Disko Bay ===
There were no qualifiers in the respective regions due to other teams dropping out because of problems and transportation difficulties.

- Being the qualified teams:
  - Nagdlunguaq-48
  - G-44 Qeqertarsuaq
  - UB-83 Upernavik
  - Tupilak-41
- And being the withdrawing teams:
  - FC Malamuk
  - Qaanaaq Sport Club
  - Siumut Amerdlok Kunuk

=== South Greenland ===
All matches played in Nuuk

Pos	Team	Pld	W	D	L	GF	GA	GD	Pts	Qualification	B67	IT79	N45	FCN	FCT
1	B-67 Nuuk	4	4	0	0	41	3	+38	12	Qualification for Final round		8–3	14–0	5–0	
2	Inuit Timersoqatigiiffiat-79	4	3	0	1	24	12	+12	9	Qualification for Final round				7–1	6–2
3	Nagtoralik-45	4	2	0	2	6	25	−19	6	Qualification for Final round		1–8		3–2	
4	FC Nuuk	4	0	1	3	4	16	−12	1	Qualification for Final round					1–1
5	FC Tugto	4	0	1	3	4	23	−19	1	Qualification for Final round	0–14		1–2		

=== East Greenland ===
Ammassalimmi Timersoqatigiiffik Ammassak (A.T.A.) qualified without having entered qualifying, as the only entrants from East Greenland; however, they withdrew for financial reasons and were replaced by Kissaviarsuk-33.

== Qualified teams ==
Location of teams of the 2025 Greenlandic Football Championship.

Team	City
B-67 Nuuk	Nuuk
FC Nuuk	Nuuk
FC Tugto	Nuuk
G-44 Qeqertarsuaq	Qeqertarsuaq
Inuit Timersoqatigiiffiat-79	Nuuk
Kissaviarsuk-33	Qaqortoq
~~Nagdlunguaq-48~~ (Note: Nagdlunguaq-48 and UB-83 Upernavik withdrew the day before the group draw because they did not have enough players available.)	Ilulissat
Nagtoralik-45	Paamiut
Siumut Amerdlok Kunuk	Sisimiut
~~UB-83 Upernavik~~	Avannaata

== Final round ==
=== Group stage ===
==== Group A ====
Pos	Team	Pld	W	D	L	GF	GA	GD	Pts	Qualification	IT79	B67	K33	T41
1	Inuit Timersoqatigiiffiat-79	3	2	1	0	4	1	+3	7	Advanced to semi-finals				1–1
2	B-67 Nuuk	3	2	0	1	19	1	+18	6	Advanced to semi-finals	0–1		10–0	9–0
3	Kissaviarsuk-33	3	1	0	2	4	12	−8	3	Advanced to placement play-offs	0–2			4–0
4	Tupilak-41	3	0	1	2	1	14	−13	1	Advanced to placement play-offs				

==== Group B ====
Pos	Team	Pld	W	D	L	GF	GA	GD	Pts	Qualification	G44	N45	FCN	FCT
1	G-44 Qeqertarsuaq	3	3	0	0	17	4	+13	9	Advanced to semi-finals				
2	Nagtoralik-45	3	2	0	1	14	8	+6	6	Advanced to semi-finals	2–4			
3	FC Nuuk	3	1	0	2	6	13	−7	3	Advanced to placement play-offs	1–7	3–5		2–1
4	FC Tugto	3	0	0	3	3	15	−12	0	Advanced to placement play-offs	1–6	1–7		

== Placement play-off matches ==
=== Bracket (5th–8th place) ===
Play-off semi-finals
2 August — Nuuk
Kissaviarsuk-33	5
FC Nuuk	0
2 August — Nuuk
Tupilak-41	3
FC Tugto	0

Fifth place match
3 August — Nuuk
Kissaviarsuk-33	8
Tupilak-41	0
Seventh place match
3 August — Nuuk
FC Nuuk	0
FC Tugto (w/o)	3

=== Fifth place semi-final ===
2 August 2025

Kissaviarsuk-33	5–0	FC Nuuk

Nuuk Stadium, Nuuk
2 August 2025

Tupilak-41	3–0	FC Tugto

Nuuk Stadium, Nuuk

=== Seventh place match ===
3 August 2025

FC Nuuk	0–3 (awarded)	FC Tugto

Nuuk Stadium, Nuuk

=== Fifth place match ===
3 August 2025

Kissaviarsuk-33	8–0	Tupilak-41

Nuuk Stadium, Nuuk

== Knockout stage ==
=== Bracket ===
Semi-finals
2 August — Nuuk
Inuit Timersoqatigiiffiat-79	6
Nagtoralik-45	0
2 August — Nuuk
G-44 Qeqertarsuaq	0
B-67 Nuuk	7

Final
3 August — Nuuk
Inuit Timersoqatigiiffiat-79	1
B-67 Nuuk	2
Third place play-off
3 August — Nuuk
Nagtoralik-45	1
G-44 Qeqertarsuaq	3

=== Semi-finals ===
2 August 2025

Inuit Timersoqatigiiffiat-79	6–0	Nagtoralik-45
Rosing 19'; Pedersen 34'; Tittussen 38'; Thyssen 63', 66'; Fleischer 82'

Nuuk Stadium, Nuuk
2 August 2025

G-44 Qeqertarsuaq	0–7	B-67 Nuuk
		Kreutzmann 46'; O. Frederiksen 51', 70'; Philbert 73'; Wind 81', 83'; Petersen 89'

Nuuk Stadium, Nuuk

=== Third place match ===
3 August 2025

Nagtoralik-45	1–3	G-44 Qeqertarsuaq
Møller 35'		Lukassen 2'; Zeeb 89', 90+5'

Nuuk Stadium, Nuuk

=== Final ===
3 August 2025

Inuit Timersoqatigiiffiat-79	1–2	B-67 Nuuk
Johansen 12'		Kreutzmann 71'; Kreuzmann 80'

Nuuk Stadium, Nuuk

== See also ==
- Football in Greenland
- Football Association of Greenland
- Greenland national football team
- Greenlandic Football Championship
