= Greenland National Day =

Greenland holiday

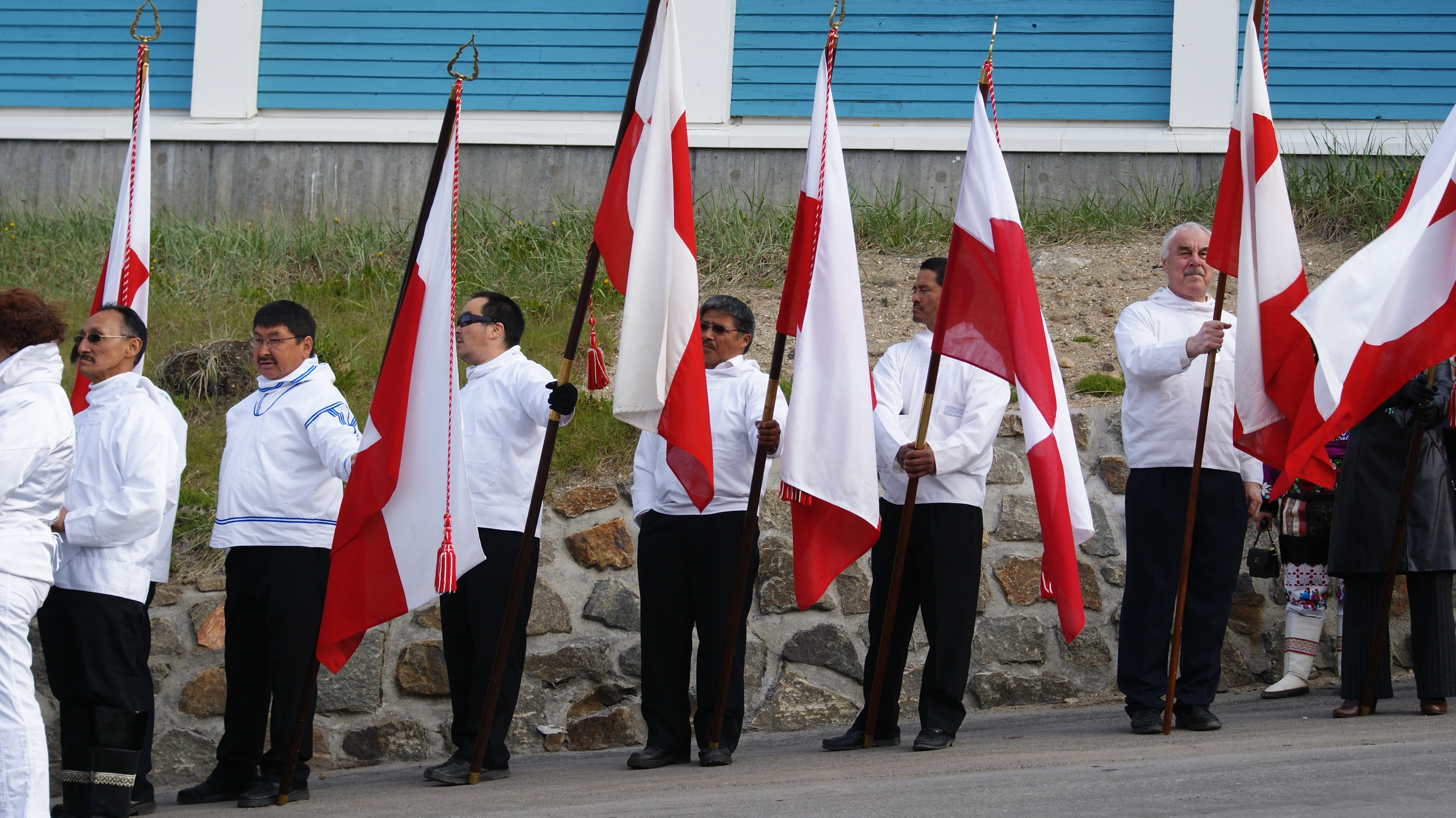
People celebrating in 2010 on the first anniversary

Greenland National Day (Greenlandic: Ullortuneq; Danish: Grønlands nationaldag) falls on 21 June and is the day of Greenlandic national identity. The day was introduced by the former Home Rule in 1985, and it was on this date that Greenland gained self-government in 2009.

National Day is celebrated in all Greenlandic settlements, and favorite activities include morning singing, coffee making, flag raising and speeches as well as cultural performances with folk dance, music and kayaking.

From 2016, Greenland National Day is also flag day in Denmark, where state authorities fly the flag of Greenland.
