= Søren Hald Møller =

High Commissioner of Greenland from 2005 to 2011

5th High Commissioner of Greenland
- In office 30 March 2005 – 31 January 2011
- Preceded by: Peter Lauritzen
- Succeeded by: Mikaela Engell

Søren Hald Møller (born 25 January 1960 in Copenhagen) was the High Commissioner of Greenland. He has a master's degree in social science from Aalborg University, which he received in 1984. He is married to Tukummeq Qaavigaq. In 2007 he became a Knight of the Dannebrog.

== Career ==
- 1985 – 1986 Teaching at the gymnasium and HF course in Frederikshavn and Aars
- 1986 – 1987 Head of the Public Procurement Board
- 1987 – 1992 Head of Section and Head of Department, the Greenland Home Rule Economics Directorate
- 1992 – 1995 Director/Deputy Permanent Secretary, The Premier's Office in Greenland Home Rule Government
- 1995 – 1996 CEO of KNI Holding A/S
- 1997 – 1999 Permanent Secretary, the Ministry of Environment and Nature, Greenland Home Rule Government
- 1999 – 2002 Permanent Secretary to the Premier of Greenland, Premier's Office, Greenland Home Rule Government
- 2002 – 2005 Project Manager and Head of Department, the Greenland Home Rule Bureau of Minerals And Petroleum
- 2005 – 2011 High Commissioner of Greenland
- 2011 - 2013 CEO of Municipality Sermersooq
- 2013 - 2015 Director, the Greenland Government's Environment Agency for Mineral Resources Activities
- 2015 - 2019 Permanent Secretary to the Premier of Greenland, Premier's Office, Greenland Government.
