= Julie Præst Wilche =

High Commissioner of Greenland since 2022

High Commissioner of Greenland
- Incumbent
- Assumed office 1 May 2022
- Monarchs: Margrethe II; Frederik X
- Preceded by: Mikaela Engell

Personal details
- Born: 25 August 1971 (age 54) Aarhus, Denmark
- Spouse: Jon Wilche
- Children: 2

Julie Præst Wilche (born 25 August 1971) is a Danish civil servant and diplomat who has been the High Commissioner of Greenland since 2022. She moved to Greenland in the 1990s and prior to her tenure as High Commissioner she worked in the correctional services of Denmark and Greenland and led the departments of Infrastructure and Social Affairs and Justice.

== Early life and education ==
Julie Præst Wilche was born in Aarhus, Denmark, on 25 August 1971. She moved to Greenland in the 1990s and graduated from University of Greenland with a Master of Science in administration. She is a trained nurse.

== Career ==
In Greenland Wilche was head of the Department of Social Affairs and Justice and the Department of Infrastructure. On 1 September 2021, she succeeded Naaja H. Nathanielsen as director of the Danish Correctional Service after having worked with the Correctional Service in Greenland. She was the director of the Greenland Prison and Probation Service.

On 1 May 2022, Wilche succeed Mikaela Engell as the High Commissioner of Greenland. As High Commissioner she is the chief representative of the monarch of Denmark. She is chair of the Greenland Foundation, the organisation formed by the merger of the Danish-Greenland Cultural Foundation and the Royal Greenland Foundation in 2015. She stated that the Danish government recognises that Greenland might gain independence one day.

== Personal life ==
Wilche married Jon Wilche, with whom she had two children. The Order of the Dannebrog was given to her by King Frederik X during a visit to Greenland in 2024.

== Works cited ==
=== News ===
- "Julie Præst Wilche". Altinget.dk. Archived from the original on 29 June 2025.
- Descamps, Philippe (2023). "Greenland is not for sale". Le Monde diplomatique. Archived from the original on 29 June 2025.
- Jakobsen, Sara (17 October 2014). "Qaqortoq-lufthavn i fare". Kalaallit Nunaata Radioa. Archived from the original on 29 June 2025.
- Lindstrom, Merete (17 August 2021). "Departementschef overtager kriminalforsorgen". Sermitsiaq. Archived from the original on 29 June 2025.
- Bill, Thor (8 July 2024). "Fik ridderkors af kongen: "Jeg er ikke den store royalist"". Kalaallit Nunaata Radioa. Archived from the original on 29 June 2025.
- Brøns, Malik (24 August 2021). "Greenland's Prison and Probation Service has a new director". Kalaallit Nunaata Radioa. Archived from the original on 29 June 2025.
- Thygesen, Peter (16 April 2022). "Sygeplejersken fra Midtjylland røg til tops i det grønlandske samfund". Politiken. Archived from the original on 10 January 2025.
- Veirum, Thomas (8 March 2022). "Direktør bliver ny rigsombudsmand". Sermitsiaq. Archived from the original on 29 June 2025.

=== Web ===
- "Den Grønlandske Fond". Inatsisartut. Archived from the original on 29 June 2025.
- "History". High Commissioner of Greenland. Archived from the original on 29 June 2025.
- "Ny rigsombudsmand i Grønland". Ministry of State. 8 March 2022. Archived from the original on 29 June 2025.
