= Mikaela Engell =

High Commissioner of Greenland from 2011 to 2022

6th High Commissioner of Greenland
- In office 1 April 2011 – 30 April 2022
- Monarch: Margrethe II
- Preceded by: Søren Hald Møller
- Succeeded by: Julie Præst Wilche

Personal details
- Born: 4 October 1956 (age 69)
- Citizenship: Kingdom of Denmark

Mikaela Engell (born 4 October 1956) is a Danish civil servant who served as High Commissioner of Greenland, a post she held from 2011 to 2022. She had previously worked in the Danish Ministry of Foreign Affairs, first as a Permanent Secretary and later as a counselor.

As High Commissioner, Engell had a seat in the Inatsisartut (parliament of Greenland), representing the Danish monarch and government, and can speak there, but not vote. She is also an ex officio member of the Danish-Greenland Cultural Foundation.
