= History of Greenland =

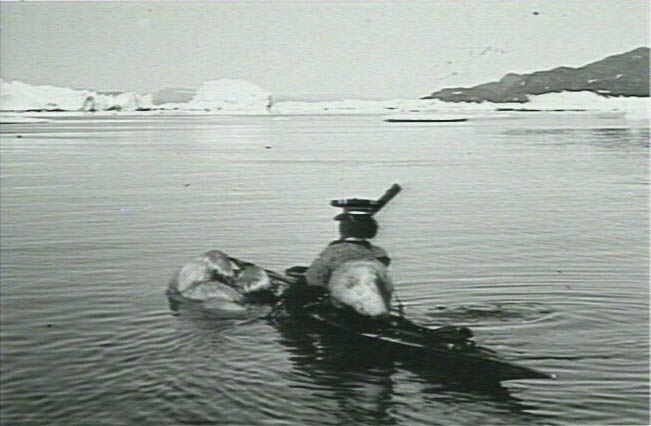
Hunting and whaling have always been important ways to make a living on Greenland. One of the animals found here is the polar bear, which is on the coat of arms of the Danish royal family in Greenland.

The history of Greenland is a history of life under extreme Arctic conditions: currently, an ice sheet covers about eighty percent of the island, restricting human activity largely to the coasts. The first humans are thought to have arrived in Greenland around 2500 BC. Their descendants most likely died out and were replaced and succeeded by several other human groups migrating from continental North America since then. There has been no evidence discovered that Greenland was known to Norsemen until the 9th century AD, when Norse Icelandic explorers settled on its southwestern coast. The ancestors of the Greenlandic Inuit who live there today appear to have migrated there later, around the year 1200, across the Nares Strait from northern Canada.

While Inuit survived in the icy world of the Little Ice Age, the early Norse settlements, known as the Eastern Settlement, along the southwestern coast disappeared, leaving Inuit as the only inhabitants of the island for several centuries. During this time, Denmark–Norway, apparently believing the Norse settlements had survived, continued to claim sovereignty over the island despite the lack of any contact between the Norsemen (specifically Icelanders) installed in Greenland and their Scandinavian brethren. In 1721, aspiring to become a colonial power, Denmark-Norway sent a missionary expedition to Greenland with the stated aim of reinstating Christianity among descendants of the Norse Greenlanders who may have converted back to paganism. When the missionaries found no descendants of the Norse Greenlanders, they baptised the Inuit they found living there instead. Denmark-Norway then developed trading colonies along the coast and imposed a trade monopoly and other colonial privileges on the area.

During World War II, when Nazi Germany invaded Denmark, Greenlanders became socially and economically less connected to Denmark. After the war, Denmark resumed control of Greenland and in 1953, converted its status from colony to overseas amt (county). Although Greenland is still a part of the Danish Realm, it has enjoyed home rule since 1979. In 1985, the island decided to leave the European Economic Community (EEC), which it had joined as a part of Denmark in 1973.

== Early Paleo-Inuit cultures ==
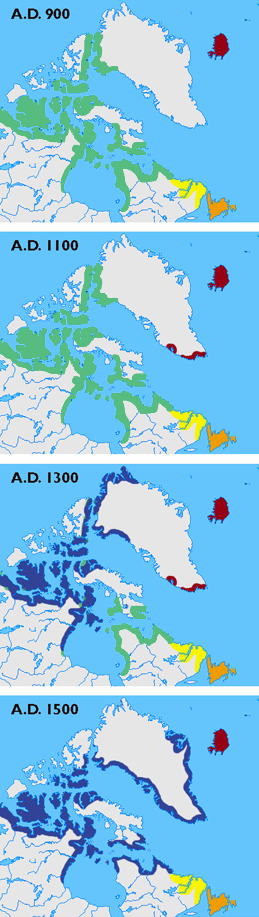
Arctic cultures from 900 to 1500: Dorset / Innu; Thule / Beothuk; Norse

The prehistory of Greenland is a story of repeated waves of Paleo-Eskimo immigration from the islands, known as the Arctic Archipelago, north of the North American mainland. (The population of those islands are thought to have descended, in turn, from inhabitants of Siberia who migrated into North America through Beringia thousands of years ago.) Because of Greenland's remoteness and climate, survival there was difficult. Over the course of centuries, one culture succeeded another as groups died out and were replaced by new immigrants. Archaeology can give only approximate dates for the cultures that flourished before the Norse exploration of Greenland in the 10th century.

The earliest known cultures in Greenland are the Saqqaq culture (2500–800 BC) and the Independence I culture in northern Greenland (2400–1300 BC). The practitioners of these two cultures are thought to have descended from separate groups that came to Greenland from North America, nearby Nunavut. Around 800 BC, the so-called Independence II culture arose in the region where the Independence I culture had previously existed. It was originally thought that Independence II was succeeded by the early Dorset culture (700 BC–AD 1), but some Independence II artefacts date from as recently as the 1st century BC. Recent studies suggest that, in Greenland at least, the Dorset culture may be better understood as a continuation of Independence II culture; the two cultures have therefore been designated "Greenlandic Dorset". Artefacts associated with early Dorset culture in Greenland have been found as far north as Inglefield Land on the west coast and the Dove Bay area on the east coast.

After the Early Dorset culture disappeared by around AD 1, Greenland was apparently uninhabited until Late Dorset people settled on the Greenlandic side of the Nares Strait around 700 AD. The late Dorset culture in the north of Greenland lasted until about 1300. Meanwhile, the Norse arrived and settled in the southern part of the island in 980.

== Norse settlement ==
Europeans probably became aware of Greenland's existence in the late 9th century, after Gunnbjörn Ulfsson, while sailing from Norway to Iceland, was blown off course by a storm and sighted some islands off Greenland. During the 980s explorers led by Erik the Red set out from Iceland and reached the southwest coast of Greenland. Erik named the island "Greenland" (Grœnland in Old Norse, Grænland in modern Icelandic, Grønland in modern Danish and Norwegian). Both the Book of Icelanders (Íslendingabók, a medieval account of Icelandic history from the 12th century onward) and the Saga of Erik the Red (Eiríks saga rauða, a medieval account of his life and of the Norse settlement of Greenland) state that Erik said that "it would encourage people to go there that the land had a good name".

According to the sagas, the Icelanders had exiled Erik the Red for three years for committing murder, c. 982. He sailed to Greenland, where he explored the coastline and claimed certain regions as his own. He then returned to Iceland to persuade people to join him in establishing a settlement on Greenland. The Icelandic sagas say that 25 ships left Iceland with Erik the Red in 985, and that only 14 of them arrived safely in Greenland. Radiocarbon dating of remains at the first settlement at Brattahlíð (Brattahlid) (now Qassiarsuk) have approximately confirmed this timeline, yielding a date of about 1000. According to the sagas, in the year 1000 Erik's son, Leif Erikson, left the settlement to explore the regions around Vinland, which historians generally assume to have been located in present-day Newfoundland.

The Norse established settlements along Greenland's south-western fjords. It is possible that the bottom lands of the southern fjords at that time were covered by high grown shrub and surrounded by hills covered with grass and brush (as the Qinngua Valley currently is), but this hasn't been determined yet. If the presumption is true then the Norse probably cleared the landscape by felling trees to use as building material and fuel, and by allowing their sheep and goats to graze there in both summer and winter. Any resultant soil erosion could have become an important factor in the demise of the colonies, as the land was stripped of its natural cover.

The Norse settled in three separate locations in south-western Greenland: the larger Eastern Settlement, the smaller Western Settlement, and the still smaller Middle Settlement (often considered part of the Eastern one). Estimates put the combined population of the settlements at their height between 2,000 and 10,000, with recent estimates trending toward the lower figure. Archaeologists have identified the ruins of approximately 620 farms: 500 in the Eastern Settlement, 95 in the Western Settlement, and 20 in the Middle Settlement.

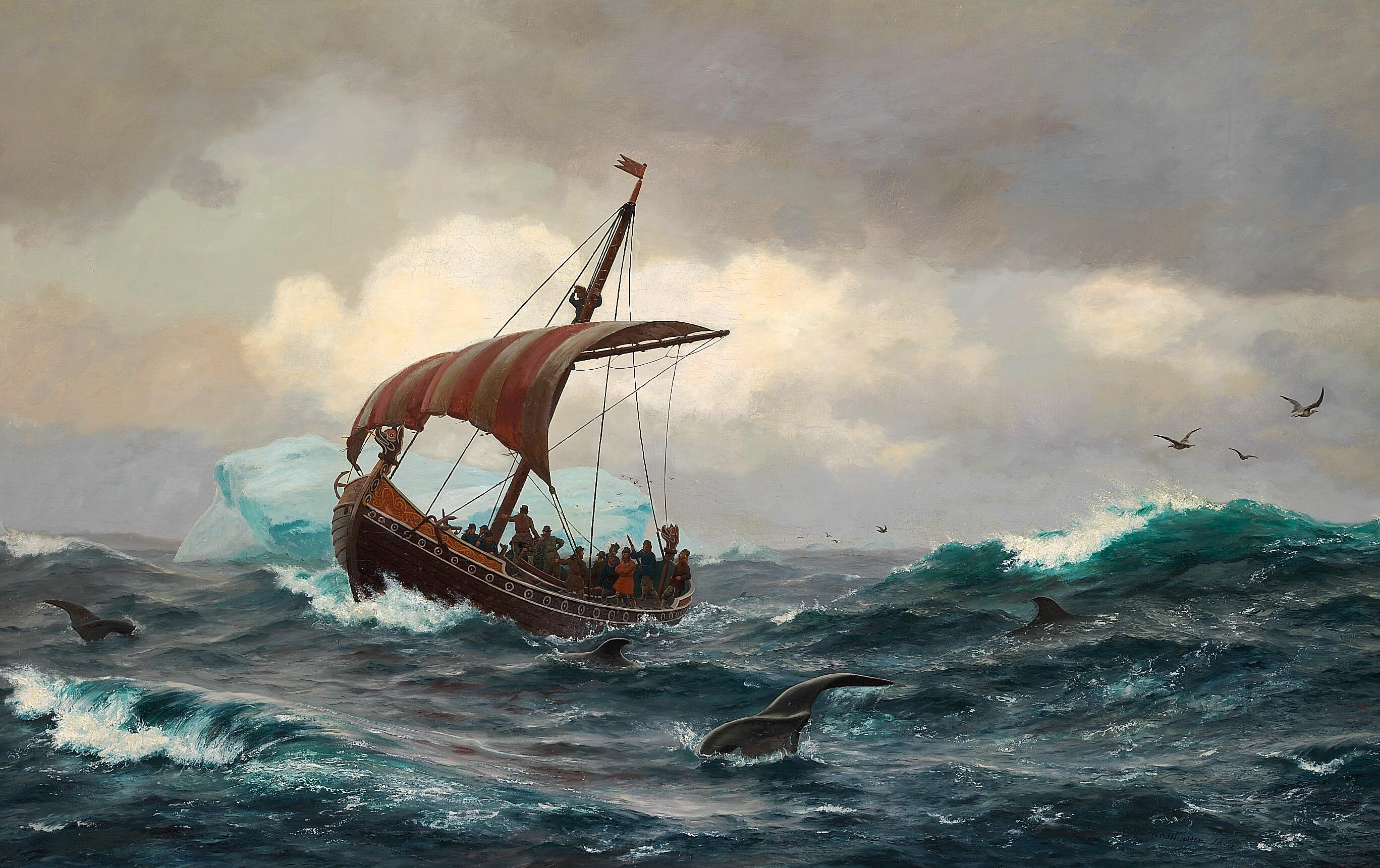
Summer Night Off the Greenland Coast Circa Year 1000 (Carl Rasmussen, 1875)

The economy of the Norse Greenlanders depended on a combination of pastoral farming with hunting and some fishing. Farmers kept cattle, sheep and goats - shipped into the island - for their milk, cheese and butter, while most of the consumed meat came from hunted caribou and seals. Both individual farmers and groups of farmers organised summer trips to the more northerly Disko Bay area, where they hunted walruses, narwhals and polar bears for their skins, hides, ivory, and tusks. Besides their use in making garments and shoes, these resources also functioned as a form of currency, as well as providing the most important export commodities.

The Greenland settlements carried on a trade with Europe in ivory from walrus ivory, as well as exporting rope, sheep, seals, wool and cattle hides (according to one 13th-century account). The Greenlandic Norsemen depended on Icelandic and Norwegian Norsemen for iron tools, wood (especially for boat building, although they may also have obtained wood from coastal Labrador - Markland), supplemental foodstuffs, and religious and social contacts. For a time, trade ships from Iceland and Norway travelled to Greenland every year and would sometimes overwinter in Greenland. Beginning in the late-13th century, laws required all ships from Greenland to sail directly to Norway. The climate became increasingly colder in the 14th and 15th centuries, during the period of colder weather known as the Little Ice Age.

In 1126 the Roman Catholic Church founded a diocese at Garðar (now Igaliku), with the Garðar Cathedral founded there. It was subject to the Roman Catholic Norwegian archdiocese of Nidaros (now Trondheim); at least five churches in Norse Greenland are known from archaeological remains. In 1261 the population accepted the over lordship of the King of Norway, although it continued to have its own law.

A union between Norway and Sweden, including Greenland and Iceland existed between 1319 and 1355 through Magnus IV of Sweden (In Norway crowned Magnus VII after claims of birthright) and between 1362 and 1364 through Haakon VI, the son "Håkan Magnusson". During this period Greenland runs were made at intervals.

After initially thriving, the Norse settlements in Greenland declined in the 14th century. In 1355 Magnus IV of Sweden (In Norway Magnus VII) sent a ship (or ships) to Greenland to inspect its Western and Eastern Settlements. Sailors found settlements entirely Norse and Christian. The Greenland carrier (Groenlands Knorr) made the Greenland run at intervals till 1369, when she sank and was apparently not replaced. The Western Settlement was probably abandoned before 1400.

In 1378 there was no longer a bishop at Garðar in the Eastern Settlement. A single source suggests that in 1379, "Skrælingjar" (Inuit) attacked the Eastern Settlement, killed 18 men and captured two boys. However, the authenticity and accuracy of this source is doubted by some historians, and both Jared Diamond and Jens Melgaard caution that it may actually describe an attack that occurred between Norse and Sámi people in Northern Europe, or an attack on the Icelandic coast by European pirates, assuming such an attack really did occur. A church document describes a 1418 attack that has been attributed to Inuit by modern scholars, but historian Jack Forbes has said that this supposed attack actually refers to a Russian-Karelian attack on Norse settlers in northern Norway, which was known locally as "Greenland" and has been mistaken by modern scholars for Greenland located in North America. Archaeological evidence has failed to find any violence by Inuit against Norse settlers.

In 1380 the Norwegian kingdom entered into a personal union with the Kingdom of Denmark. From 1402–1404 the Black Death hit Iceland for the first time and killed approximately half the population there - but there is no evidence that it reached Greenland. The last written record of the Norse Greenlanders documents a marriage in 1408 at Hvalsey Church, whose ruins are the best-preserved of the Norse buildings of that period.

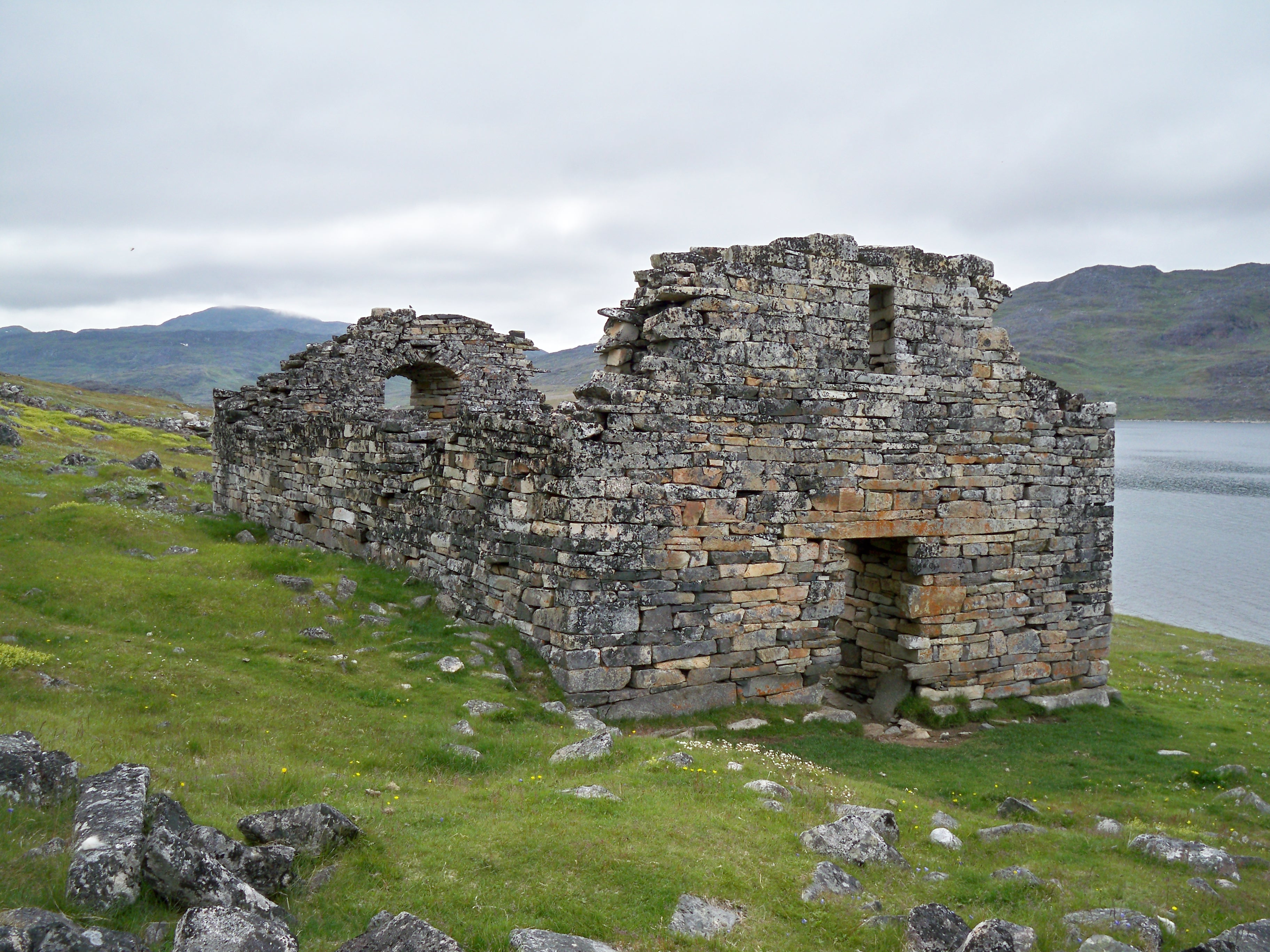
Hvalsey Church ruins

After 1408 few written records mention the settlers. Correspondence between Pope Gregory XII and the Bishop Bertold af Garde dates from the same year. The Danish cartographer Claudius Clavus seems to have visited Greenland in 1420, according to documents written by Nicolaus Germanus and Henricus Martellus Germanus, who had access to original cartographic notes and a map by Clavus. In the late 20th century the Danish scholars Bjönbo and Petersen found two mathematical manuscripts containing the second chart of the Claudius Clavus map from his journey to Greenland (where he himself mapped the area).

In 1448, Pope Nicholas V, in a letter from Rome, instructed the bishops of Skálholt and Hólar (the two Icelandic episcopal sees) to provide the inhabitants of Greenland ("the island of Greenland, which is said to be placed at the farthest ends of the ocean near the northern region of the kingdom of Norway, in the province of Nidaros") with priests and a bishop, the latter of which they had not had in the 30 years since a purported attack by "heathens"; the letter, while noting that its author does "not have certain knowledge of their circumstances", describes "a barbarian fleet" from "the neighboring shores of the heathens" who destroyed most of the churches and took many prisoners, most of whom later managed to return to their settlement. It is probable that the Eastern Settlement was defunct by the middle of the 15th century, although no exact date has been established. A European ship that landed in the former Eastern Settlement in the 1540s found the corpse of a Norse man there, which may be the last mention of a Norse individual from the settlement. The Icelandic seafarer Jon Greenlander, who visited Greenland around 1540, described the dead Norse Greenlander as a

Dead man lying face downwards on the ground. On his head was a hood, well made, and otherwise good clothing of frieze cloth and sealskin. Near him was a sheath-knife, bent and much worn and eaten away.

This was reportedly the last time any European saw any of the Norse Greenlanders dead or alive.

Unlike Vinland, Greenland was known to many Europeans in the Middle Ages. Frederick II, Holy Roman Emperor, wrote about Greenland as did the Italian Galvano Fiamma.

== Norse abandonment ==
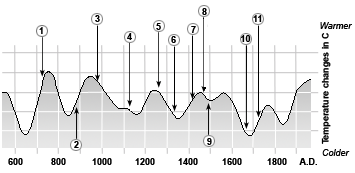
A graphical description of changes in temperature in Greenland from 500 – 1990 based on analysis of the deep ice core from Greenland and some historical events. The annual temperature changes are shown vertical in ˚C. The numbers are to be read horizontal: 1. From 700 to 750 people belonging to the Late Dorset culture move into the area around Smith Sound, Ellesmere Island and Greenland north of Qaanaaq (Thule).; 2. Norse settlement of Iceland starts in the second half of the 9th century.; 3. Norse settlement of Greenland starts just before 1000.; 4. Thule Inuit move into northern Greenland in the 12th century.; 5. Late Dorset culture disappears from Greenland in the second half of the 13th century.; 6. The Western Settlement disappears in mid 14th century.; 7. In 1408 is the Marriage in Hvalsey, the last known written document on the Norse in Greenland.; 8. The Eastern Settlement disappears in the mid-15th century.; 9. John Cabot is the first European in the post-Iceland era to visit Labrador - Newfoundland in 1497.; 10. "Little Ice Age" from c. 1600 to mid 18th century.; 11. The Norwegian priest Hans Egede arrives in Greenland in 1721.

There are many theories as to why the Norse settlements in Greenland collapsed after surviving for some 450–500 years (985 to 1450–1500). Among the factors that have been suggested as contributing to the demise of the Greenland colony are:

- Cumulative environmental damage
- Gradual climate change
- Conflicts with Inuit
- Loss of contact and support from European Norsemen
- Cultural conservatism and failure to adapt to an increasingly harsh natural environment
- Opening of opportunities elsewhere after the Black Death had left many farmsteads abandoned in Iceland and Norway
- Declining value of walrus ivory in Europe (due to the influx of ivory from Russian walrus and African elephants), forcing hunters to overkill the walrus populations and endanger their own survival

Numerous studies have tested these hypotheses and some have led to significant discoveries. In The Frozen Echo, Kirsten Seaver contests some of the more generally accepted theories about the demise of the Greenland colony, and asserts that the colony, towards the end, was healthier than some scholars previously claimed. Seaver believes that the Greenlanders could not have starved to death, but rather may have been wiped out by Inuit or unrecorded European attacks, or they may have abandoned the colony for Iceland or Vinland. However, the physical evidence from archaeological studies of the ancient farm sites does not show evidence of attack. The paucity of personal belongings at these sites is typical of North Atlantic Norse sites that were abandoned in an orderly fashion, with any useful items being deliberately removed; but to others it suggests a gradual but devastating impoverishment. Middens at these sites do show an increasingly impoverished diet for humans and livestock. Else Roesdahl argues that declining ivory prices in Europe due to the influx of Russian and African ivory adversely affected the Norse settlements in Greenland, which depended largely on the export of walrus ivory to Europe.

According to Danielle Kurin and other authors, there is no convincing evidence that violence by Inuit or any other group led to the migration of Norse settlers, and that Norse society in Greenland seems to have slowly declined as climatic conditions worsened and the value of walrus ivory was reduced by African elephant ivory. The violent conflict theory has since been marginalised in favour of ecological theories. One scholar supporting the violent conflict theory is historian Arnved Nedkvitne, who concludes in his work: "the hypothesis of an ethnic confrontation is today significantly better verified than the alternative hypothesis of an ecological crisis".

Greenland was always colder in winter than Iceland and Norway, and its terrain less hospitable to agriculture. Erosion of the soil was a danger from the beginning, one that the Greenland settlements may not have recognised until it was too late. For an extended time, nonetheless, the relatively warm West Greenland Current flowing northwards along the southwestern coast of Greenland made it feasible for the Norse to farm much as their relatives did in Iceland or northern Norway. Palynologists' tests on pollen counts and fossilised plants prove that the Greenlanders must have struggled with soil erosion and deforestation. A Norse farm in the Vatnahverfi district, excavated in the 1950s, had been buried in layers of drifting sand up to 3.0 m (10 ft) deep. As the unsuitability of the land for agriculture became more and more patent, the Greenlanders resorted first to pastoralism and then to hunting for their food. But they never learned to use the hunting techniques of the Inuit, one being a farming culture, the other living on hunting in more northern areas with pack ice.

To investigate the possibility of climatic cooling, scientists drilled into the Greenland ice cap to obtain core samples, which suggested that the Medieval Warm Period had caused a relatively milder climate in Greenland, lasting from roughly 800 to 1200. However, from 1300 or so the climate began to cool. By 1420, the "Little Ice Age" had reached intense levels in Greenland. Excavations of middens from the Norse farms in both Greenland and Iceland show the shift from the bones of cows and pigs to those of sheep and goats. As the winters lengthened, and the springs and summers shortened, there must have been less and less time for Greenlanders to grow hay. A study of North Atlantic seasonal temperature variability showed a significant decrease in maximum summer temperatures beginning in the late 13th century to early 14th century—as much as 6–8 °C (11–14 °F) lower than modern summer temperatures. The study also found that the lowest winter temperatures of the last 2,000 years occurred in the late 14th century and early 15th century. By the mid-14th-century deposits from a chieftain's farm showed a large number of cattle and caribou remains, whereas, a poorer farm only several kilometres away had no trace of domestic animal remains, only seal. Bone samples from Greenland Norse cemeteries confirm that the typical Greenlander diet had increased by this time from 20 percent sea animals to 80 percent.

The Thule people migrated south and finally came into contact with the Norse in the 12th century. There are limited sources showing the two cultures interacting; however, scholars know that the Norse referred to Inuit (and Vinland natives) as skræling. The Icelandic annals are among the few existing sources that confirm contact between the Norse and Inuit. Archaeological evidence seems to show that the two groups traded. There is evidence of Inuit goods at Norse sites, and Norse goods at Inuit sites. According to Magnus Magnusson, relations between Inuit and Norse settlers were mostly positive and the two groups had a "deep friendship".

The Norse never learned the Inuit techniques of kayak navigation or ring seal hunting. Archaeological evidence plainly establishes that by 1300 or so the Inuit had successfully expanded their winter settlements as close to the Europeans as the outer fjords of the Western Settlement. By 1350, the Norse had completely deserted their Western Settlement. But in 1355 union king Magnus IV of Sweden and Norway (In Norway crowned Magnus VII after claims of birthright) sent a ship (or ships) to Greenland to inspect its Western and Eastern Settlements. Sailors found settlements entirely Norse and Christian. The Greenland carrier (Groenlands Knorr) made the Greenland run at intervals till 1369, when she sank and was apparently not replaced. Arneborg suggests that worsening climatic and economical circumstances caused them to migrate to Iceland or Scandinavia.

In mild weather conditions, a ship could make the 1,400 km (900 mi) trip from Iceland to Eastern Settlement within a couple of weeks. Greenlanders had to keep in contact with Iceland and Norway in order to trade. Little is known about any distinctive shipbuilding techniques among the Greenlanders. Greenland lacks a supply of lumber, so was completely dependent on Icelandic merchants or, possibly, logging expeditions to the Canadian coast.

The sagas mention Icelanders travelling to Greenland to trade. Settlement chieftains and large farm owners controlled this trade. Chieftains would trade with the foreign ships and then disperse the goods by trading with the surrounding farmers. The Greenlanders' main commodity was the walrus tusk, which was used primarily in Europe as a substitute for elephant ivory for art décor, whose trade had been blocked by conflict with the Islamic world. Professor Gudmundsson suggests a very valuable narwhal tusk trade, through a smuggling route between western Iceland and the Orkney islands.

It has been argued that the royal Norwegian monopoly on shipping contributed to the end of trade and contact. However, Christianity and European customs continued to hold sway among the Greenlanders for the greater part of the 14th and 15th centuries. In 1921, a Danish historian, Paul Norland, found human remains from the Eastern Settlement in the Herjolfsnes church courtyard. The bodies were dressed in 15th-century clothing with no indications of malnutrition or inbreeding. Most had crucifixes around their necks with their arms crossed as in a stance of prayer. Roman papal records report that the Greenlanders were excused from paying their tithes in 1345 because the colony was suffering from poverty. The last reported ship to reach Greenland was a private ship that was "blown off course", reaching Greenland in 1406, and departing in 1410 with the last news of Greenland: the burning at the stake of Kolgrim, a condemned male witch, the insanity and death of the woman this witch was accused of attempting to seduce through witchcraft, and the marriage of the ship's captain, Thorsteinn Ólafsson, to another Icelander, Sigríður Björnsdóttir. However, there are some suggestions of much later unreported voyages from Europe to Greenland, possibly as late as the 1480s. In the 1540s, a ship drifted off-course to Greenland and discovered the body of a dead man lying face down who demonstrated cultural traits of both Norse and Inuit. An Icelandic crew member of the ship wrote: "He had a hood on his head, well sewn, and clothes from both homespun and sealskin. At his side lay a carving knife bent and worn down by whetting. This knife they took with them for display."

According to a 2009 study, "there is no evidence for perceptible contact between Iceland and Greenland after the mid fifteenth century ... It is clear that neither Danish and Norwegian nor Icelandic public functionaries were aware that the Norse Greenland colony had ceased to exist. Around 1514, the Norwegian archbishop Erik Valkendorf (Danish by birth, and still loyal to Christian II) planned an expedition to Greenland, which he believed to be part of a continuous northern landmass leading to the New World with all its wealth, and which he fully expected still to have a Norse population, whose members could be pressed anew to the bosom of church and crown after an interval of well over a hundred years. Presumably, the archbishop had better archives at his disposal than most people, and yet he had not heard that the Greenlanders were gone."

One intriguing fact is that very few fish remains are found among their middens. This has led to much speculation and argument. Most archaeologists reject any decisive judgement based on this one fact, however, as fish bones decompose more quickly than other remains, and may have been disposed of in a different manner. Isotope analysis of the bones of inhabitants shows that marine food sources supplied more and more of the diet of the Norse Greenlanders, making up between 50 percent and 80 percent of their diet by the 14th century.

One Inuit story recorded in the 19th century tells that raiding expeditions by Inuit or European ships over the course of three years destroyed the settlements, however archaeological evidence has repeatedly failed to support such stories. This story is thus regarded as a myth that is not based on true events, because archaeological excavations of the farm revealed no evidence of fire or human conflict.

=== Genetic legacy ===
Genetic research has found that Inuit men in Western Greenland carry 40 to 60 percent Northwestern European Y-DNA haplogroups. This is consistent with admixture from the earlier Norse settlers of Greenland (1000-1200 AD), as well as more recent colonisation of Greenland by modern Scandinavians in the 18th century. According to several studies, there is no evidence of a European female contribution to the mitochondrial lineages of modern Greenlandic Inuit; their maternal lineages are nearly completely shared with other Inuit populations. This implies that European admixture in Greenlandic people derives primarily from European male ancestors.

== Late Dorset and Thule cultures ==
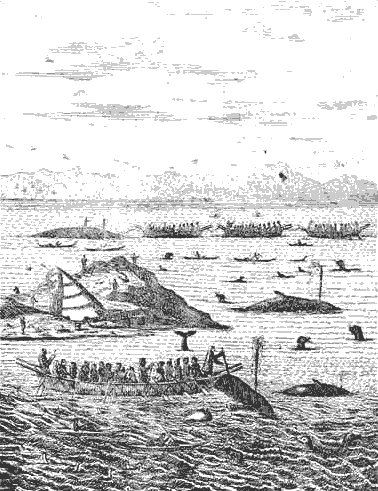
The Thule were skilled whalers, as depicted here by Norwegian missionary Hans Egede in the 18th century.

The Late Dorset culture inhabited Greenland until the early 14th century. This culture was primarily located in the northwest of Greenland, far from the Norse who lived around the southern coasts. Archaeological evidence points to this culture predating the Norse or Thule settlements. In the region of this culture, there is archaeological evidence of gathering sites for around four to thirty families, living together for a short time during their movement cycle.

Around AD 1300–1400, the Thule arrived from the west settling in the northeast areas of Greenland; genetic data suggest that they colonised the island in a single wave spreading along the coast from the northwest to the south to the east. These people, the ancestors of the modern Greenland Inuit, were flexible and engaged in the hunting of almost all animals on land and in the ocean, including walrus, narwhal, and seal. The Thule adapted well to the environment of Greenland, as archaeological evidence indicates that the Thule were not using all parts of hunting kills, unlike other Arctic groups, meaning they were able to waste more resources due to either surplus or well adapted behaviours. Genetic comparisons indicate gene flow between the ancestors of the Dorset and of the Thule at least 4000 years ago, long before the Thule migrated out of the Bering Strait region, but genetic data from the modern Greenlandic and Canadian Inuit shows no evidence of more recent Dorset admixture, indicating that the Thule replaced the Dorset with little or no interbreeding with them.

The nature of the contacts between the Dorset and Norse cultures is not clear, but may have included trade elements. The level of contact is currently the subject of widespread debate, possibly including Norse trade with Thule or Dorset peoples in Canada. Whether the Thule interbred with the medieval Norse cannot be clearly determined from the genetic data, since the modern Greenlandic Inuit population has substantial admixture from the later Danish colonial period; however, the facts that Inuit in southern Greenland, where the Norse settled, have no more European ancestry than the Inughuit of northwestern Greenland, and that even in southern Greenland more than half of village-dwelling Inuit have no European ancestry, indicate that the Thule probably did not interbreed with the Norse.

== Danish recolonisation ==
Most of the old Norse records concerning Greenland were removed from Trondheim to Copenhagen in 1664 and subsequently lost, probably in the Copenhagen Fire of 1728. The precise date of rediscovery is uncertain because south-drifting icebergs during the Little Ice Age long made the eastern coast unreachable. This led to general confusion between Baffin Island, Greenland, and Spitsbergen, as seen, for example, in the difficulty locating the Frobisher "Strait", which was not confirmed to be a bay until 1861. Nonetheless, interest in discovering a Northwest Passage to Asia led to repeated expeditions in the area, though none were successful until Roald Amundsen in 1906 and even that success involved his being iced in for two years. Christian I of Denmark purportedly sent an expedition to the region under Pothorst and Pining to Greenland in 1472 or 1473; Henry VII of England sent another under Cabot in 1497 and 1498; Manuel I of Portugal sent a third under Corte-Real in 1500 and 1501. It had certainly been generally charted by the 1502 Cantino map, which includes the southern coastline. The island was "rediscovered" yet again by Martin Frobisher in 1578, prompting King Frederick II of Denmark to outfit a new expedition of his own the next year under the Englishman James Alday; this proved a costly failure. The influence of English and Dutch whalers became so pronounced that for a time the western shore of the island itself became known as "Davis Strait" (Dutch: Straat Davis) after John Davis's 1585 and 1586 expeditions, which charted the western coast as far north as Disko Bay.

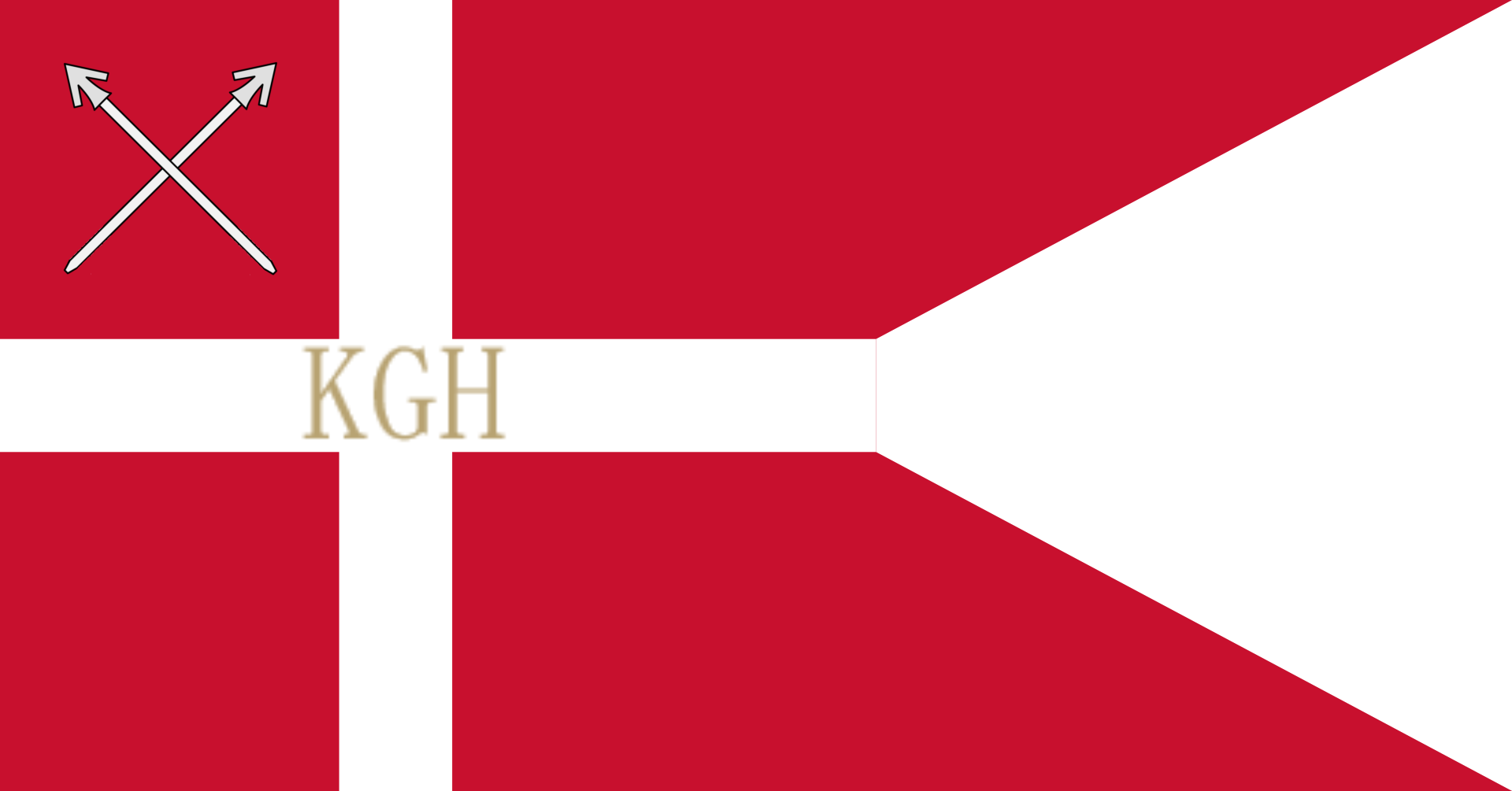
Merchant flag for whaling in Greenland

Meanwhile, following the Swedish War of Liberation and exit from the Kalmar Union, the remaining states in the personal union were reorganised into Denmark–Norway in 1536. In protest against foreign involvement in the region, the Greenlandic polar bear was included in the state's coat of arms in the 1660s (it was removed in 1958 but remains part of the royal coat of arms). In the second half of the 17th century Dutch, German, French, Basque, and Dano-Norwegian ships hunted bowhead whales in the pack ice off the east coast of Greenland, regularly coming to shore to trade and replenish drinking water. Foreign trade was later forbidden by Danish monopoly merchants.

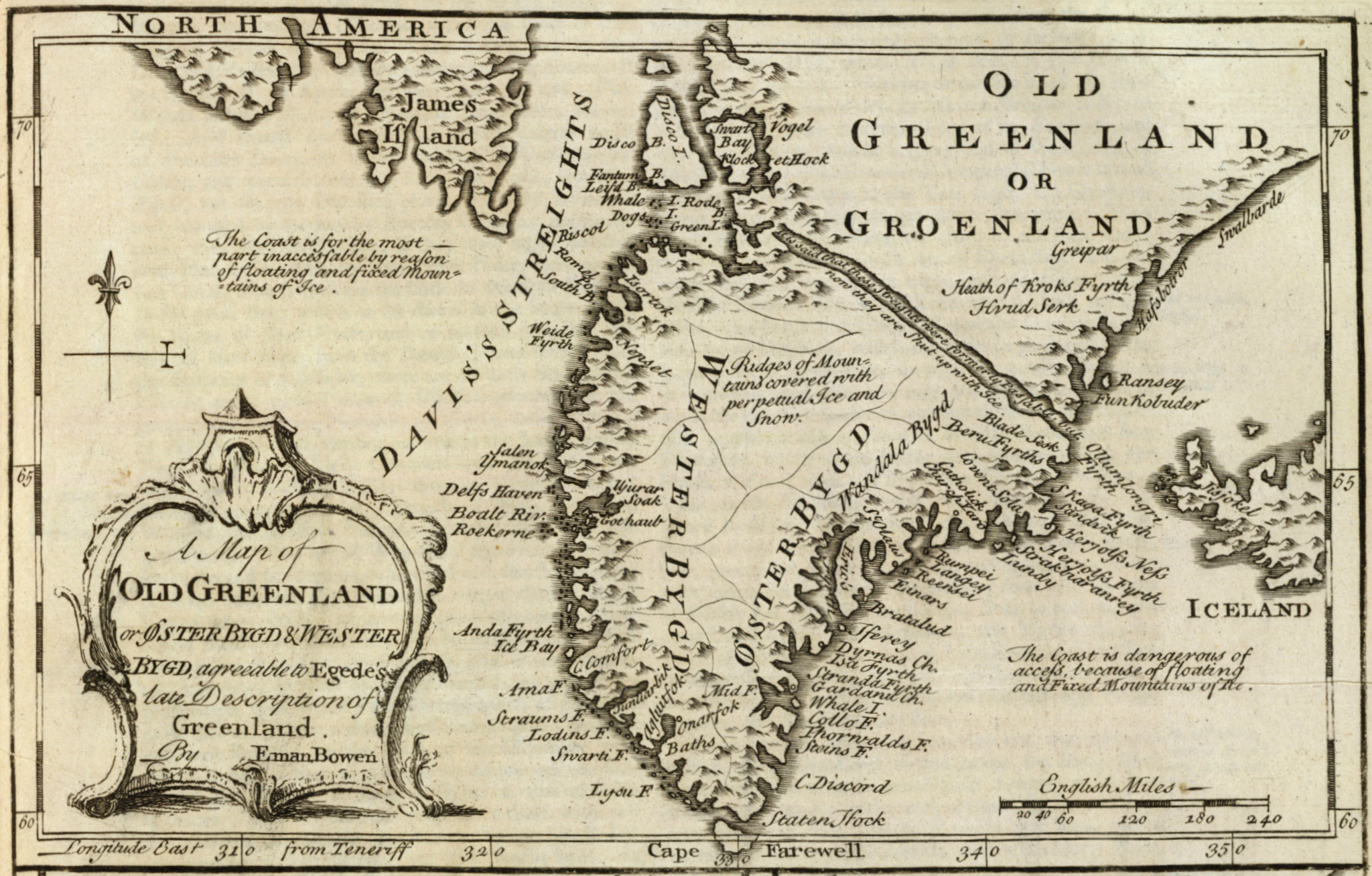
A 1747 map based on Hans Egede's descriptions, including many geographical errors common to the time

From 1711 to 1721, the Norwegian cleric Hans Egede petitioned King Frederick IV of Denmark for funding to travel to Greenland and re-establish contact with the Norse settlers there. Presumably, such settlers would still be Catholic or even Norse pagans, and he desired to establish a mission among them to spread the Reformation. Frederick permitted Egede and some Norwegian merchants to establish the Bergen Greenland Company to revive trade with the island but refused to grant them a monopoly over it for fear of antagonising Dutch whalers in the area. The Royal Mission College assumed authority over the mission and provided the company with a small stipend. Egede found but misidentified the ruins of the Norse colony, went bankrupt amid repeated attacks by the Dutch, and found lasting conversion of the migrant Kalaallit exceedingly difficult. An attempt to found a royal colony under Major Claus Paarss established the settlement of Nuuk, then called Godthåb ("Good Hope"), in 1728, but became a costly debacle which saw most of the soldiers mutiny and the settlers killed by scurvy. Two child converts sent to Copenhagen for the coronation of Christian VI returned in 1733 with smallpox, devastating the island. The same ship that returned them, however, also brought the first Moravian missionaries, who in time would convert a former angakkoq (Inuit shaman), experience a revival at their mission of Neu-Herrnhut, and establish a string of mission houses along the southwest coast. Around the same time, the merchant Jacob Severin took over administration of the colony and its trade, and having secured a large royal stipend and full monopoly from the king, successfully repulsed the Dutch at the Battle of Jacobshavn in a series of skirmishes in 1738 and 1739. Egede himself quit the colony on the death of his wife, leaving the Lutheran mission to his son Poul. Both of them had studied the Kalaallisut extensively and published works on it; as well, Poul and some of the other clergy sent by the Mission College, such as Otto Fabricius, began wide-ranging study of Greenland's flora, fauna, and meteorology. However, though kale, lettuce, and other herbs were successfully introduced, repeated attempts to cultivate wheat or clover failed throughout Greenland, limiting the ability to raise European livestock.

As a result of the Napoleonic Wars, Norway was ceded to Sweden at the 1814 Treaty of Kiel. The colonies, including Greenland, remained in Danish possession. The 19th century saw increased interest in the region on the part of polar explorers and scientists like William Scoresby and Greenland-born Knud Rasmussen. At the same time, the colonial elements of the earlier trade-oriented Danish presence in Greenland expanded. In 1861, the first journal in the Greenlandic language was founded. Danish law still applied to only the Danish settlers, though. At the turn of the 19th century, the northern part of Greenland was still sparsely populated; only scattered hunting inhabitants were found there. During that century, however, Inuit families immigrated from British North America to settle in these areas. The last group from what later became Canada arrived in 1864. During the same time, the northeastern part of the coast became depopulated following the violent 1783 Lakagígar eruption in Iceland.

Democratic elections for the district assemblies of Greenland were held for the first time in 1862–1863, although no assembly for the land as a whole was allowed. In 1888, a party of six led by Fridtjof Nansen accomplished the first land crossing of Greenland. The men took 41 days to make the crossing on skis, at approximately 64°N latitude. In 1911, two Inatsisartut (Landstings) were introduced, one for northern Greenland and one for southern Greenland, not to be finally merged until 1951. All this time, most decisions were made in Copenhagen, where the Greenlanders had no representation. Towards the end of the 19th century, traders criticised the Danish trade monopoly. It was argued that it kept the natives in non-profitable ways of life, holding back the potentially large fishing industry. Many Greenlanders however were satisfied with the status quo, as they felt the monopoly would secure the future of commercial whaling. It probably did not help that the only contact the local population had with the outside world was with Danish settlers. Nonetheless, the Danes gradually moved over their investments to the fishing industry.

By 1911, the population was about 14,000, scattered along the southern shores. They were nearly all Christian, because of the missionary efforts of Moravians and especially Hans Egede (1686–1758), a Lutheran missionary called "the Apostle of Greenland". He founded Greenland's capital Godthåb, now known as Nuuk. His grandson Hans Egede Saabye (1746–1817) continued the missionary activities.

In 1951, the Danish authorities initiated the little Danes experiment, a social experiment aimed at creating a new elite in Greenland. As part of this project, 22 children between the ages of five and eight were sent from Greenland to Denmark to learn the Danish language and culture, with the intention that they would later return and serve as a link between the two societies. Upon arrival in Denmark, the children were deprived of contact with their families and placed in foster homes or orphanages. Two years later, 16 of them returned to Greenland, but instead of being reunited with their relatives, they were placed in an orphanage, and many never saw their families again. This experience caused severe damage to their mental health and cultural identity.

== Polar exploration ==
At the end of the 19th century and beginning of the 20th century, American explorers, including Robert Peary, explored the northern sections of Greenland, which up to that time had been a mystery and were often shown on maps as extending over the North Pole. Peary discovered that Greenland's northern coast in fact stopped well short of the pole. These discoveries were considered to be the basis of an American territorial claim in the area. But after the United States purchased the Virgin Islands from Denmark in 1917, it agreed to relinquish all claims on Greenland.

== Strategic importance ==
After Norway regained full independence in 1905, it argued that Danish claims to Greenland were invalid since the island had been a Norwegian possession prior to 1814. In 1931, Norwegian meteorologist Hallvard Devold occupied uninhabited eastern Greenland, on his own initiative. After the fact, the occupation was supported by the Norwegian government, who claimed the area as Erik the Red's Land. Two years later, the Permanent Court of International Justice ruled in favour of Denmark.

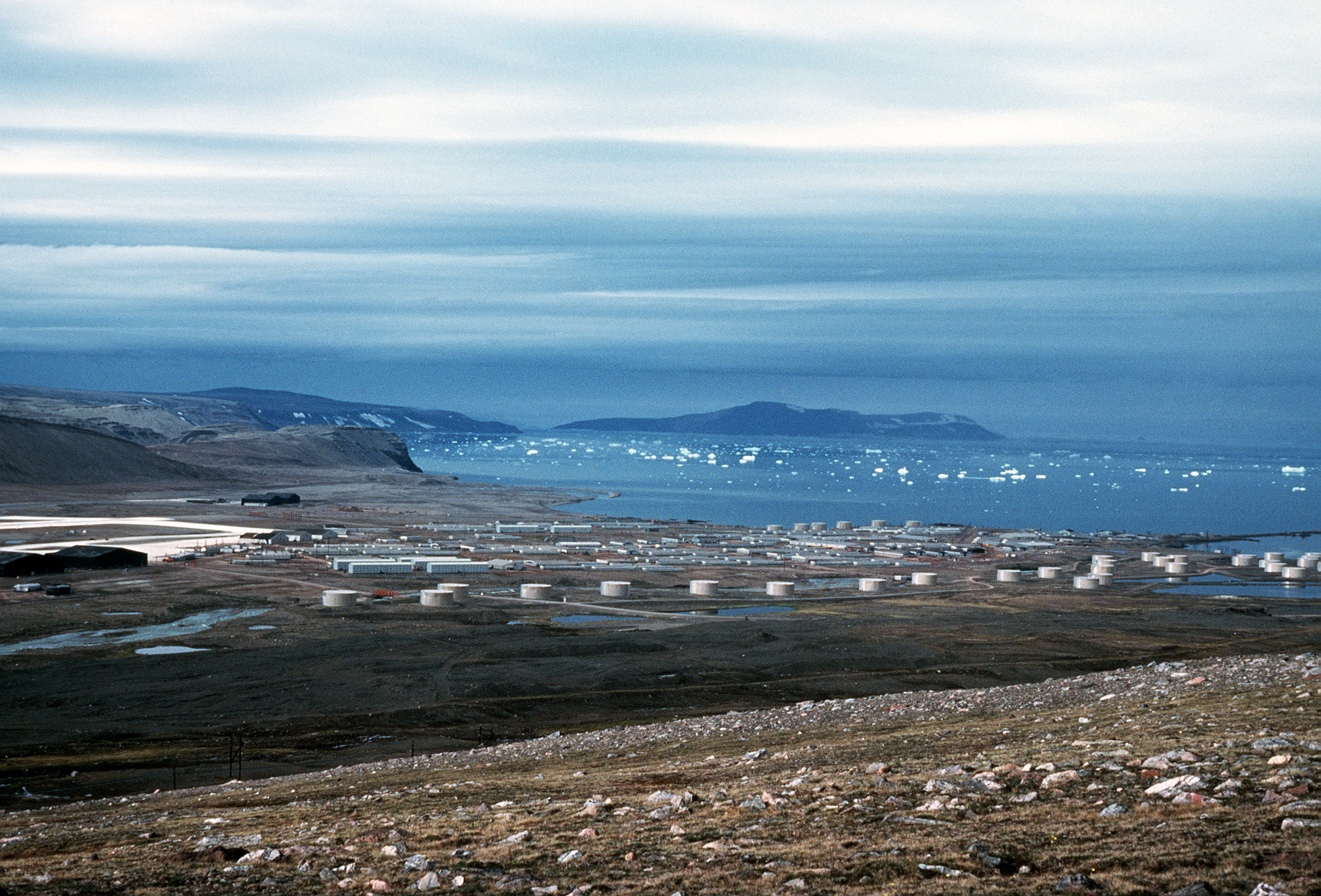
The Pituffik Space Base, established after World War II, is the northernmost base of the United States Space Force

=== World War II ===
The Nazi invasion and occupation of Denmark in 1940 cut Greenland off from Danish control and supplies. Greenland emerged as strategically important to the Allies and Nazi Germany for use as bases in the Battle of the Atlantic and for vital weather forecasting. Henrik Kauffmann, the Danish Minister to the United States — who had already refused to recognise the German occupation of Denmark — signed a treaty with the United States on 9 April 1941, granting permission to establish stations in Greenland. Kauffmann did this without the knowledge of the Danish government, and consequently "the Danish government accused him of high treason, fired him and told him to come home immediately – none of which had any result". A series of 14 American bases were built on the west and east coasts Greenland to ferry aircraft to Europe and to provide bases for American, Canadian and British forces to attack German submarines. Because it was difficult for the Danish government to govern the island during the war, and because of successful exports, especially of cryolite, Greenland came to enjoy a rather independent status. Its supplies were guaranteed by the United States.

German forces attempted to set up a series of weather stations in Eastern Greenland to gain strategic weather intelligence as part of the North Atlantic weather war. Greenland established the Sirius Dog Sled Patrol ("The Sledge Patrol") in 1941 using small teams of Greenlanders and sled dogs to locate and attack the stations in conjunction with US naval and air units. In the series of remote attacks and counterattacks that followed, one Dane and a German were killed in fighting and the Germans were forced to abandon their weather stations by 1944.

=== Cold War ===
During the Cold War, Greenland had a strategic importance, controlling parts of the passage between the Arctic Ocean harbours of the Soviet Union and the Atlantic Ocean, as well as being a good base for observing any use of intercontinental ballistic missiles, typically planned to pass over the Arctic. In the first proposed United States acquisition of Greenland, the country offered to buy it for $100,000,000 but Denmark did not agree to sell. In 1951, the 1941 treaty was replaced by another one. The Thule Air Base, now the Pituffik Space Base, in the northwest was made permanent. In 1953, some Inuit families were forced by Denmark to move from their homes to provide space for extension of the base. For this reason, the base has been a source of friction between the Danish government and the Greenlandic people. In the 1968 Thule Air Base B-52 crash of 21 January 1968, four hydrogen bombs contaminated the area with radioactive debris. Although most of the contaminated ice was cleaned up, one of the bombs was not accounted for, and is still missing as of 2022. A 1995 Danish parliamentary scandal, dubbed Thulegate, highlighted that nuclear weapons were routinely present in Greenland's airspace in the years leading up to the accident, and that Denmark had tacitly given the go-ahead for this activity despite its official nuclear free policy.

The United States upgraded the Ballistic Missile Early Warning System to a phased array radar. Opponents argue that the system presents a threat to the local population, as it would be targeted in the event of nuclear war. During the period of rapid urbanisation in Greenland, much of the Greenlandic villages were cut off from support, with the Danish government encouraging migration towards the cities. The new immigrants who had lived in a traditional Inuit hunter societies were generally isolated inside cities with no social support, many of them suffered from extreme mental health issues in the cities, with a high rate of suicide, issues which still remain in Greenland to this day.

== Home rule ==
The American presence in Greenland brought Sears catalogues, from which Greenlanders and Danes purchased modern appliances and other products by mail. From 1948 to 1950, the Greenland Commission studied the conditions on the island, seeking to address its isolation, unequal laws, and economic stagnation. In the end, the Royal Greenland Trading Department's monopolies were finally removed. In 1953, Greenland was raised from the status of colony to that of an autonomous province or constituent country of the Danish Realm. Greenland was also assigned its own Danish county. Despite its small population, it was provided nominal representation in the Danish Folketing.

A plantation of exotic arctic trees was created in 1954 near Narsarsuaq.

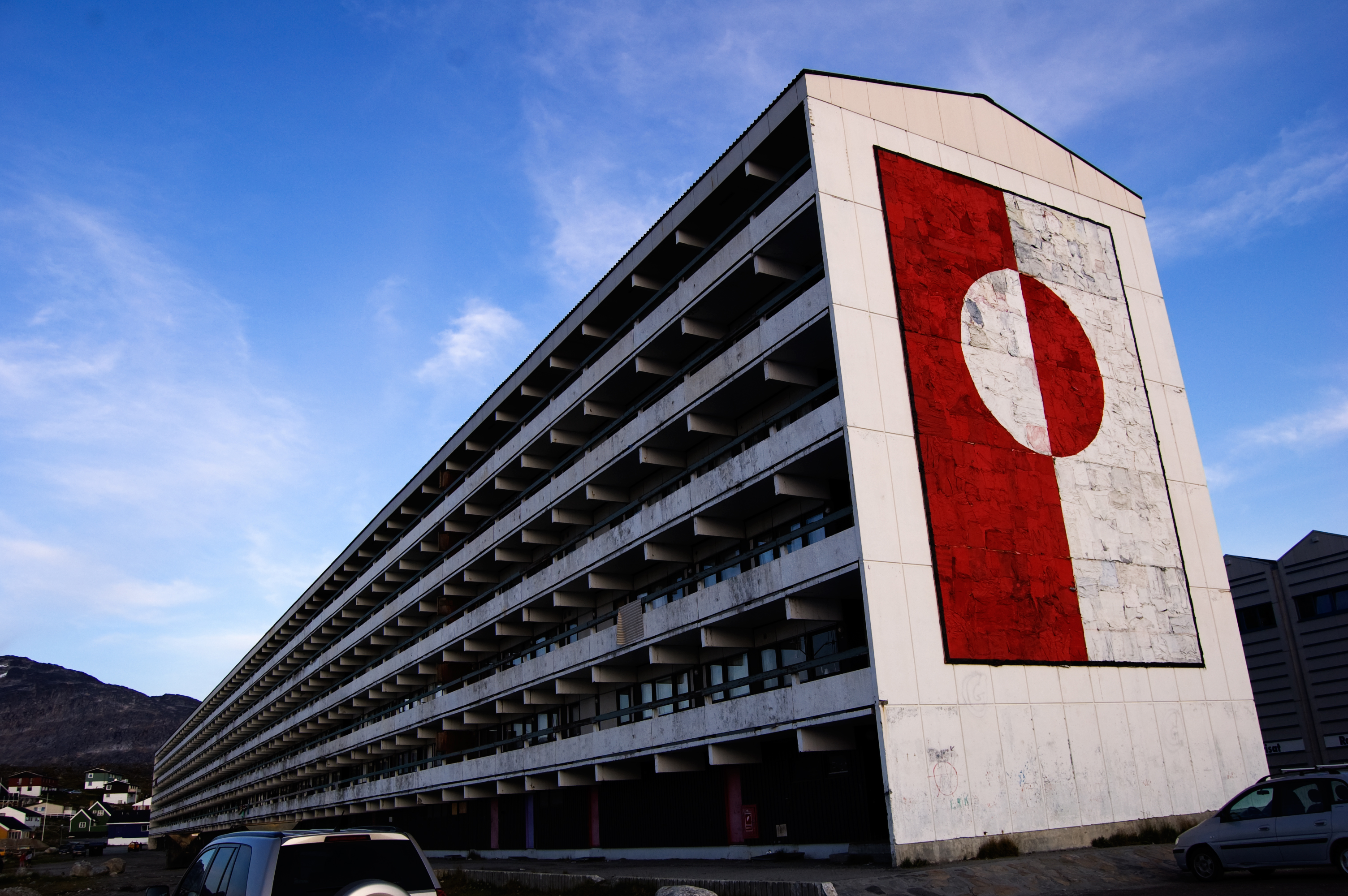
Blok P, the largest building in Greenland and formerly home to about 1 percent of its population, was demolished on 19 October 2012.

Denmark began a number of reforms aimed at urbanising the Greenlanders, principally to replace their dependence on dwindling seal populations and provide workers for the then swelling cod fisheries, but also to provide improved social services such as health care, education, and transportation. These reforms led to a number of problems, particularly modern unemployment and the infamous Blok P housing project. The attempt to introduce European-style urban housing suffered from such inattention to local detail that Inuit could not fit through the doors in their winter clothing and fire escapes were constantly blocked by fishing gear too bulky to fit into the cramped apartments. As of 1975 Denmark subsidised Greenland with more than $100 million annually. Reportedly, 80 percent of the island's 800 teachers were Danish, while only one doctor and three lawyers were Greenlandic. Television broadcasts began in 1982. The collapse of the cod fisheries and mines in the late 1980s and early 1990s greatly damaged the economy, which now principally depends on Danish aid and cold-water shrimp exports. Large sectors of the economy remain controlled by state-owned corporations, with Air Greenland and the Arctic Umiaq ferry heavily subsidised to provide access to remote settlements. The major airport is Nuuk Airport near the capital Nuuk.

Greenland's minimal representation in the Folketing meant that despite 70.3 percent of Greenlanders rejecting entry into the European Common Market (EEC), it was pulled in along with Denmark in 1973. Fears that the customs union would allow foreign firms to compete and over fish its waters were quickly realised and the local parties began to push strongly for increased autonomy. The Folketing approved devolution in 1978 and the next year enacted home rule under a local Inatsisartut. On 23 February 1982, a bare majority (53 percent) of Greenland's population voted to leave the EEC, a process which lasted until 1985. This resulted in the Greenland Treaty of 1985 and the withdrawal of Greenland from the European Communities.

Greenland Home Rule has become increasingly Greenlandised, rejecting Danish and avoiding regional dialects to standardise the country under the language and culture of the Kalaallit (West Greenland Inuit). The capital Godthåb was renamed Nuuk in 1979; a local flag was adopted in 1985; the Royal Greenland Trading Department became the locally administered Kalaallit Niuerfiat (now KNI A/S) in 1986. Following a successful referendum on self-government in 2008, the local parliament's powers were expanded and Danish was removed as an official language in 2009.

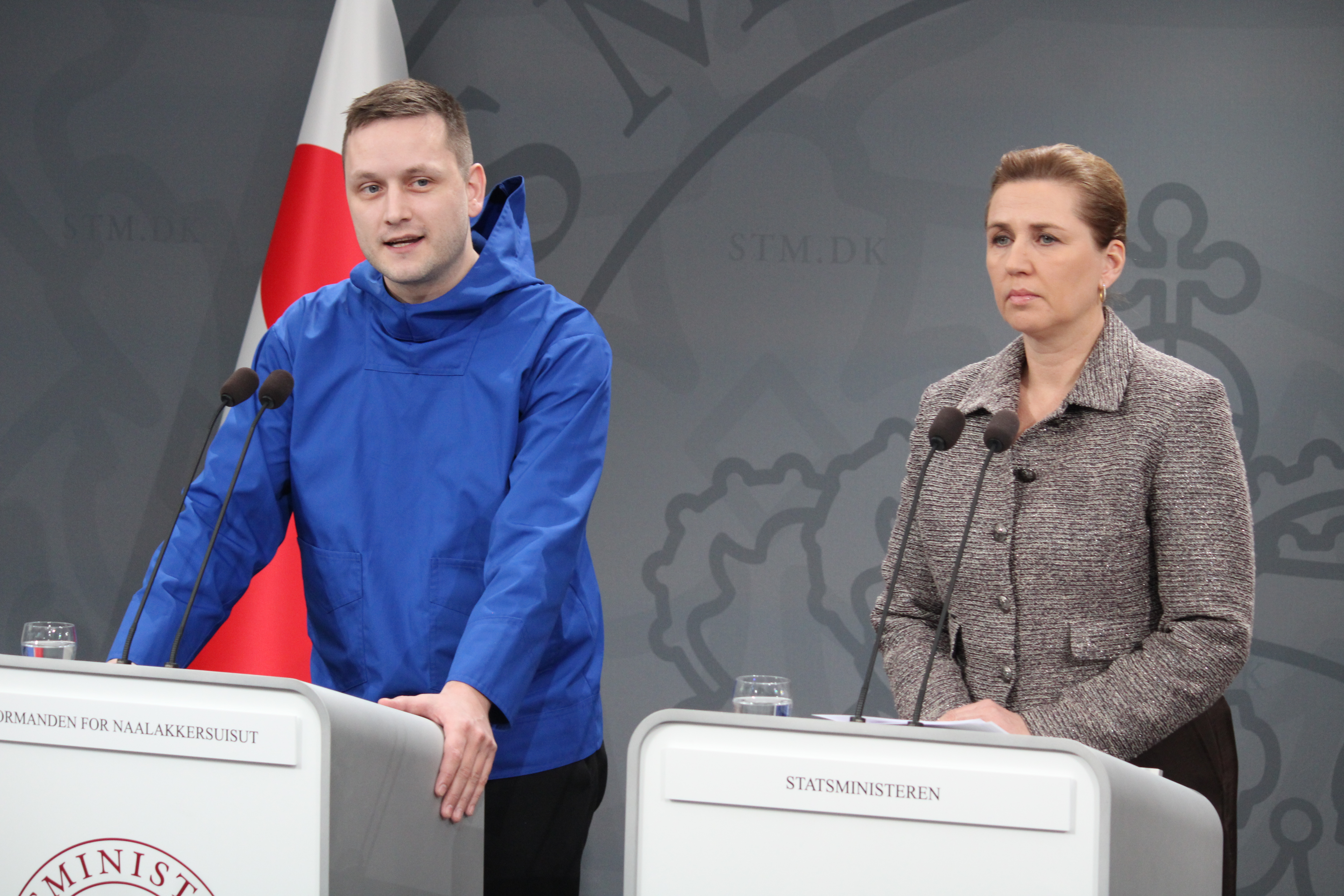
Greenlandic prime minister Jens Frederik-Nielsen announcing "We choose Denmark" at a January 2026 press conference with Mette Frederiksen in response to Trump's threats to invade or annex the country

International relations are now largely, but not entirely, also left to the discretion of the home rule government. As part of the treaty controlling Greenland's exit of the EEC, Greenland was declared a "special case" with access to the EEC market as a constituent country of Denmark, which remains a member. Greenland is also a member of several small organisations along with Iceland, the Faroes, and the Inuit populations of Nunavut (Canada) and Russia. It was one of the founders of the environmental Arctic Council in 1996. Nuuk was the site of the founding of the Inuit Circumpolar Council (originally the Inuit Circumpolar Conference in Barrow, Alaska), of which Greenlandic politician, Hans-Pavia Rosing was the first president. The US military bases on the island remain a major issue, with some politicians pushing for renegotiation of the 1951 US–Denmark treaty by the Home Rule government. The 1999–2003 Commission on Self-Governance even proposed that Greenland should aim at Thule base's removal from American authority and operation under the aegis of the United Nations.

=== Second presidency of Donald Trump ===
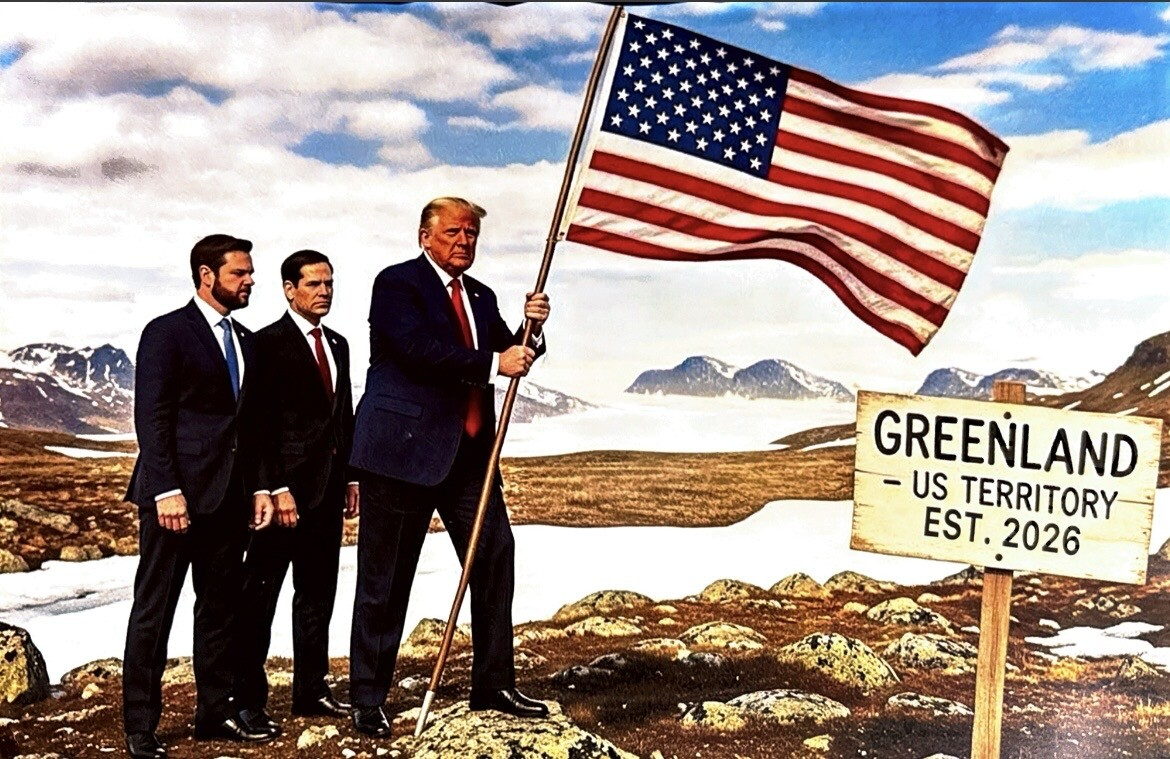
An AI image posted by Donald Trump on his Truth Social regarding the Greenland crisis

In January 2025, US President Donald Trump, newly inaugurated to his second term, pressured Denmark to sell Greenland to the United States and threatened military action, but Greenland and Denmark have rejected his demand. A January 2025 poll found 85% of Greenlanders oppose leaving Denmark to join the United States, while just 6% support the idea.

== See also ==
- Christian IV's expeditions to Greenland
- Danish colonization of the Americas
- Genetic history of the Indigenous peoples of the Americas
- History of the Americas
- History of Denmark
- History of Iceland
- History of Norway
- Inuit religion
- Norse settlement of North America
- Timeline of Greenland

== Bibliography ==
- Diamond, Jared (2005). Collapse: How Societies Choose to Fail or Succeed. Viking. ISBN 978-0-14-303655-5.
- Seaver, Kristen A. (1996). The Frozen Echo. Stanford University Press. ISBN 978-0-8047-3161-4.
- Grove, Jonathan (2009). "The Place of Greenland in Medieval Icelandic Saga Narrative". Journal of the North Atlantic. 201: 30–51. doi:10.3721/037.002.s206. JSTOR 26686936.
- Kendrick, T.D. (2012) [1930]. A History of the Vikings. Courier. ISBN 978-0-486-12342-4.
- Hreinsson, Viðar, ed. (1997). The Complete Sagas of Icelanders, Including 49 Tales. Reykjavík: Leifur Eiríksson. ISBN 978-9979-9293-0-7.
- U.S. National Museum of Natural History (2000). Fitzhugh, William W.; Ward, Elisabeth I. (eds.). Vikings: The North Atlantic Saga. Smithsonian Institution Press. ISBN 978-1-56098-970-7.
- Gulløv, Hans Christian, ed. (2005). Grønlands forhistorie. Gyldendal: National Museum of Denmark. ISBN 978-87-02-01724-3.
- Greenland during the Cold War. Danish and American security policy 1945–1968. Copenhagen: Danish Institute of International Affairs (DUPI). 17 January 1997. ISBN 978-87-601-6922-9. LCCN 97161960.
- Hansen, Jens Peder Hart; Medlgaard, Jorgen (1991). Greenland Mummies. McGill-Queen's Press - MQUP. p. 18. ISBN 978-0-7735-6312-4.
- McAnany, Patricia A. (28 September 2009). Questioning Collapse: Human Resilience, Ecological Vulnerability, and the Aftermath of Empire. Cambridge University Press. ISBN 978-1-107-71732-9.
- Cole, Adrian (26 August 2014). The Thinking Past: Questions and Problems in World History to 1750. Oxford University Press. ISBN 978-0-19-979462-1.
- Forbes, Jack (1 October 2010). The American Discovery of Europe. University of Illinois Press. ISBN 978-0-252-09125-4.
