= High Commissioner of Greenland =

Diplomatic mission of Denmark to Greenland

- Kalaallit Nunaanni Naalagaaffiup Sinniisoqarfia (Greenlandic); Rigsombudsmanden i Grønland (Danish)
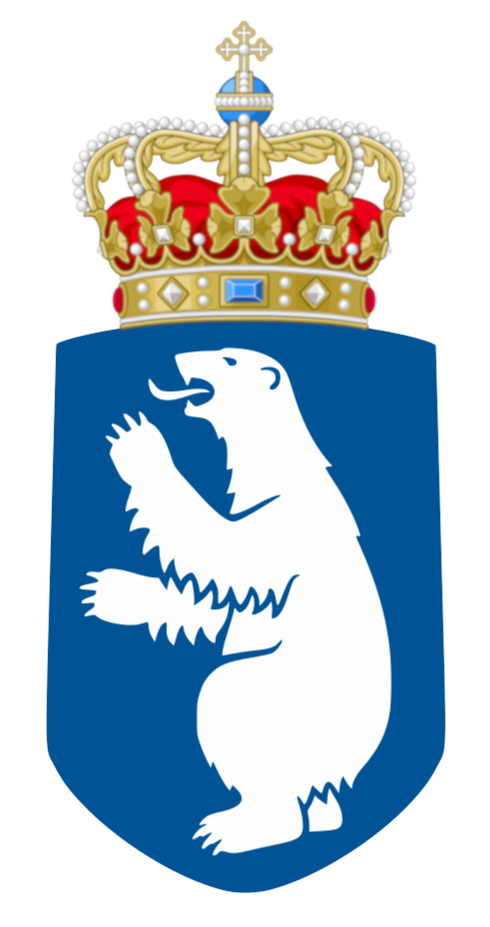
- Incumbent; Julie Præst Wilche since 1 May 2022
- Ministry of State
- Type: High commissioner
- Status: Chief governmental representative
- Reports to: His Majesty The King; The Prime Minister
- Website: Official website

The High Commissioner of Greenland (Greenlandic: Kalaallit Nunaanni Naalagaaffiup Sinniisoqarfia, Danish: Rigsombuddet i Grønland) is the chief representative of the King of Denmark and Government of the Kingdom of Denmark in Greenland, an autonomous territory in the Kingdom of Denmark.

The High Commissioner leads and is supported in their functions by their office, the High Commission. They are based in Nuuk, the capital of Greenland.

== Functions ==
The high commissioner represents the crown and the Kingdom Government (Regeringen) in Greenland. The office is responsible for liaising between the Territorial Self Rule Government (Naalakkersuisut) and the Kingdom Government and falls under the Prime Minister's Office.

The High Commissioner deals with matters of family law in their capacity as Chief Administrative Officer.

The Government of Greenland notifies the High Commission of all statutes and regulations adopted by the Parliament of Greenland (Inatsisartut) and of any other general legislation drawn up by the Government of Greenland. In addition, the Government of Greenland may call on the High Commissioner to participate in negotiations within Greenlandic institutions.

The High Commissioner and the High Commission's tasks furthermore consist of:

1. Submitting periodic reports to the Kingdom's Ministry of State (Statsministeriet), attending meetings of the Parliament of Greenland, and submitting reports to the Prime Minister's Office and other relevant ministries about parliament's discussions.
2. Addressing as the magistrates, like the Agency of Family Law in the Denmark (proper), for family law matters in the kingdom.
3. Participate in the planning and settlement of visits to Greenland from the royal family, the Kingdom Parliament (Folketinget), the government, others and participation in the related meeting activities.
4. Co-ordination of the more principled inquiries made by the State to the Self Rule Government.
5. Completion of transit permits for Thule Air Base to Danish nationals residing in Greenland.
6. Holding elections in Greenland to the Kingdom Parliament and any referendums decided by the Kingdom Government.
7. Decisions on complaints about public registration.
8. Setting the royal honors (knightly orders, medals and honors).

The High Commissioner (Greenlandic: Naalagaaffiup Sinniisaa, Danish: Rigsombudsmanden) may participate in all negotiations about matters of common interest in the Inatsisartut (the Parliament of Greenland), but has no vote.

The High Commissioner is an ex-officio member of the Greenlandic Fund.

=== List of officeholders ===
No.	Portrait	Name (born–died)	Term of office			Ref.
No.	Portrait	Name (born–died)	Took office	Left office	Time in office	Ref.
1		Torben Hede Pedersen (1937–2000)	1 May 1979	13 July 1992	13 years, 73 days	
2		Steen Spore (1938–2022)	1 August 1992	1 July 1995	2 years, 334 days	
3		Gunnar Martens (born 1940)	1 July 1995	31 March 2002	6 years, 273 days	
4		Peter Lauritzen (born 1959)	1 April 2002	30 March 2005	2 years, 363 days	
5		Søren Hald Møller (born 1960)	30 March 2005	31 January 2011	5 years, 307 days	
6		Mikaela Engell (born 1957)	1 April 2011	30 April 2022	11 years, 29 days	
7		Julie Præst Wilche (born 1972)	1 May 2022	Incumbent	4 years, 129 days	

== See also ==
- List of governors of Greenland
- High Commission of Denmark, Tórshavn
