= Kielsen VII Cabinet =

Government of Greenland (2020–2021)

Kim Kielsen VII
- 20th Cabinet of Greenland
- Incumbent
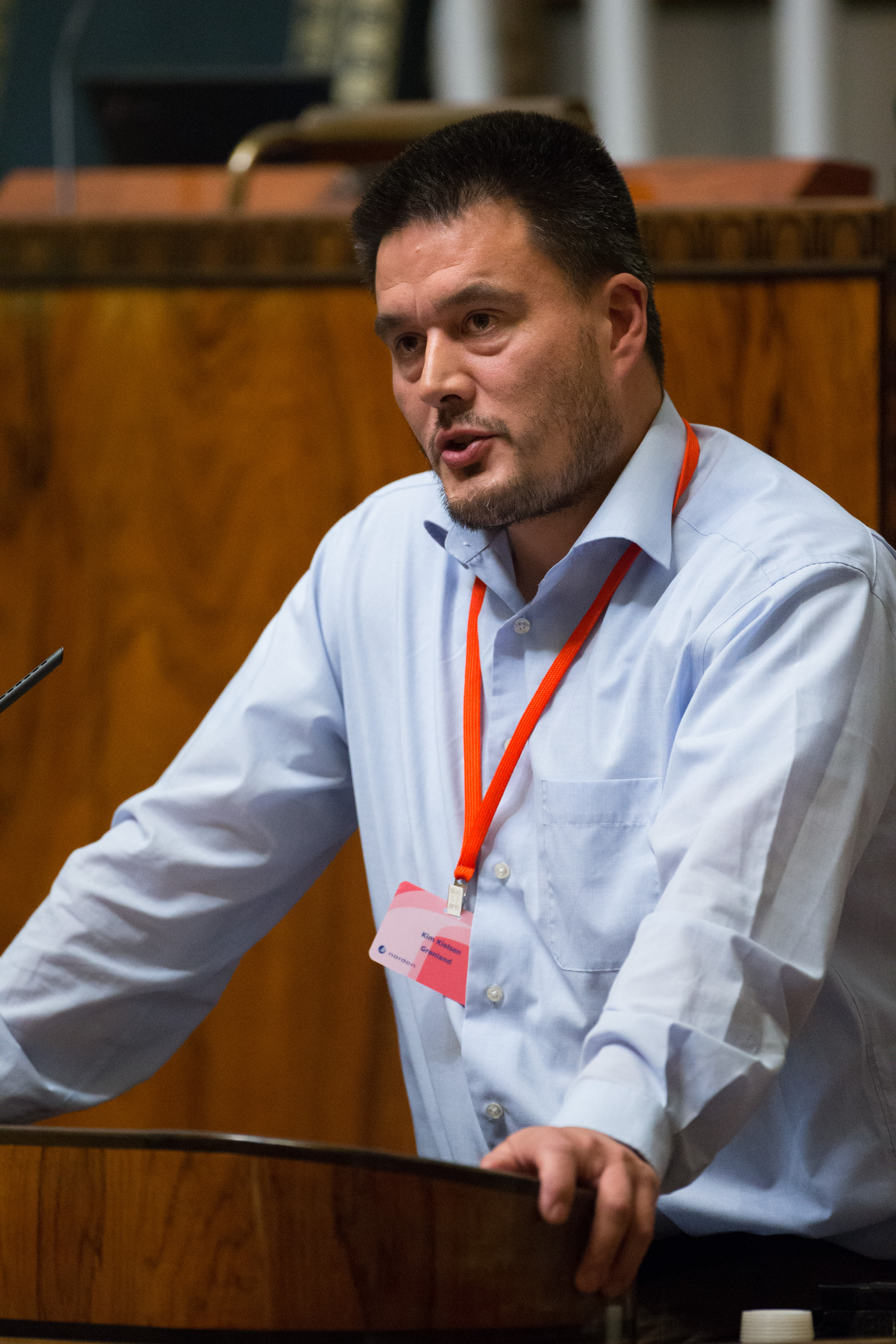
- Date formed: 29 May 2020
- Date dissolved: 23 April 2021

People and organisations
- Head of state: Margrethe II of Denmark
- Head of government: Kim Kielsen
- Member party: Siumut; Nunatta Qitornai; Democrats
- Status in legislature: Minority coalition government
- Opposition party: Inuit Ataqatigiit; Cooperation Party; Partii Naleraq; Atassut

History
- Election: 2018 general election
- Legislature term: 2018–2022
- Predecessor: Kielsen VI Cabinet
- Successor: Egede I Cabinet

The seventh Cabinet of Kim Kielsen was the Government of Greenland in office from 29 May 2020 to 23 April 2021. It was a coalition minority government consisting of Siumut, the Democrats and Nunatta Qitornai.

On 8 February 2021 the Democrats left the coalition following disagreement with the new leadership of Siumut over a proposed open-pit mine near the town of Narsaq. Some of their responsibilities were distributed among the remaining members of the cabinet. An early election was called following the 2021 opening of the national assembly, which was held on 6 April 2021.

== List of ministers ==
The Social Democratic Forward has 6 ministers including the Premier. The centrist party Nunatta Qitornai has 1 minister, and the Democrats have 3.

Portfolio	Minister	Took office	Left office	Party
The Premier's Office
Premier of Greenland	Kim Kielsen	10 December 2014	23 April 2021	Siumut
Minister for Education, Culture, Church	Ane Lone Bagger	05 October 2018	31 July 2020	Siumut
Minister for Education, Culture, Church	Katti Frederiksen	05 November 2020	23 April 2021	Siumut
Minister for Foreign Affairs and Energy	Steen Lynge	29 May 2020	8 February 2021	Democrats
Minister for Industry and Mineral Resources	Jens-Frederik Nielsen	29 May 2020	8 February 2021	Democrats
Minister for Health	Anna Wangenheim	29 May 2020	8 February 2021	Democrats
Minister for Social and Family Affairs and Justice	Martha Abelsen		23 April 2021	Siumut
Minister of Finance	Vittus Qujaukitsoq	11 May 2018	23 April 2021	Nunatta Qitornai
Minister of Labour, Research and the Environment	Jess Svane		23 April 2021	Siumut
Minister for Fisheries, Hunting and Agriculture	Jens Immanuelsen		23 April 2021	Siumut
Minister for Housing and Infrastructure	Karl Frederik Danielsen		23 April 2021	Siumut

== See also ==
- Cabinet of Greenland

Preceded by Kielsen VI	Cabinet of Greenland; 29 May 2020 – 23 April 2021	Succeeded by Egede I
