= Kielsen VI Cabinet =

Kim Kielsen VI
- 19th Cabinet of Greenland
- Incumbent
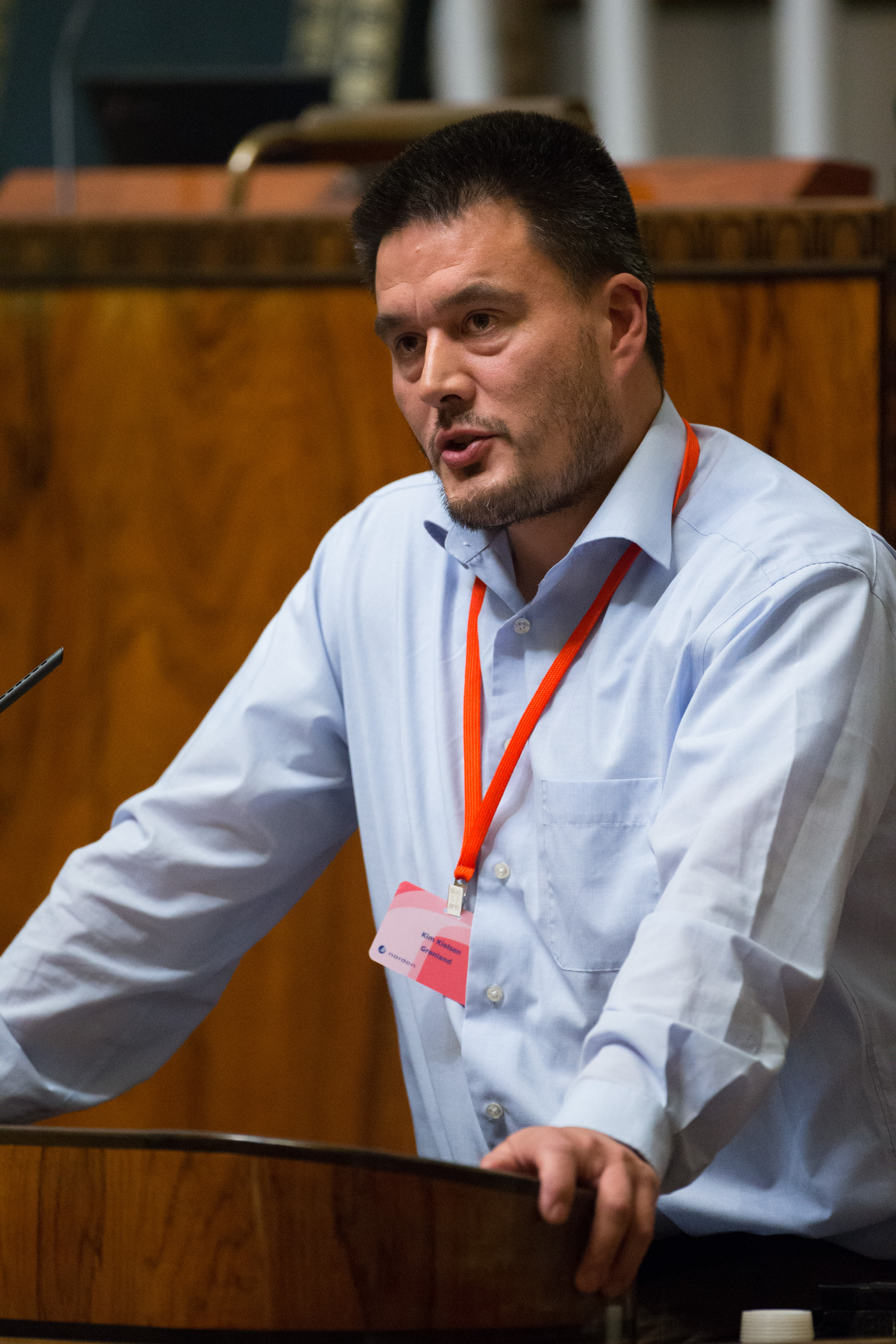
- Date formed: 9 April 2019
- Date dissolved: 29 May 2020

People and organisations
- Head of state: Margrethe II of Denmark
- Head of government: Kim Kielsen
- Member party: Forward (Siumut) S Descendants of Our Country (Nunatta Qitornai) NQ
- Status in legislature: Minority (coalition)
- Opposition party: Democrats (Demokraatit) D Community of the People (Inuit Ataqatigiit) IA; Cooperation Party (Suleqatigiissitsisut) SA; Point of Orientation Party (Partii Naleraq) PN; Solidarity (Atassut) A
- Opposition leader: Niels Thomsen; Sara Olsvig

History
- Election: 2018 general election
- Legislature term: 2018-2022
- Predecessor: Kielsen V Cabinet
- Successor: Kielsen VII Cabinet

The Sixth Cabinet of Kim Kielsen was the Government of Greenland, in office between 9 April 2019 and 29 May 2020, where Kielsen VII Cabinet took over. It was a coalition minority government consisting of Siumut and Descendants of Our Country.

== List of ministers ==
The Social Democratic Forward had 6 ministers including the Premier. The Centrist party Descendants of Our Country had 1 minister.

Cabinet members
Portfolio	Minister	Took office	Left office	Party
The Premier's Office
Premier of Greenland	Kim Kielsen	10 December 2014	29 May 2020	Siumut
Minister for Education, Culture, Church and Foreign Affairs	Ane Lone Bagger	5 October 2018	29 May 2020	Siumut
Minister for Health, Social Affairs and Justice	Martha Abelsen	9 April 2019	29 May 2020	Siumut
Minister of Finance and Mineral Resources	Vittus Qujaukitsoq	9 April 2019	29 May 2020	Nunatta Qitornai
Minister of Industry, Energy, Research and Labour	Jess Svane	9 April 2019	29 May 2020	Siumut
Minister for Fisheries, Hunting and Agriculture	Jens Immanuelsen	9 April 2019	29 May 2020	Siumut
Minister for Housing and Infrastructure	Karl Frederik Danielsen	9 April 2019	29 May 2020	Siumut

== See also ==
- Cabinet of Greenland

Preceded by Kielsen V	Cabinet of Greenland; 9 April 2019 - 29 May 2020	Succeeded by Kielsen VII
