= Kielsen V Cabinet =

Government of Greenland (Oct 2018–Apr 2019)

Kim Kielsen V
- 18th Cabinet of Greenland
- Incumbent
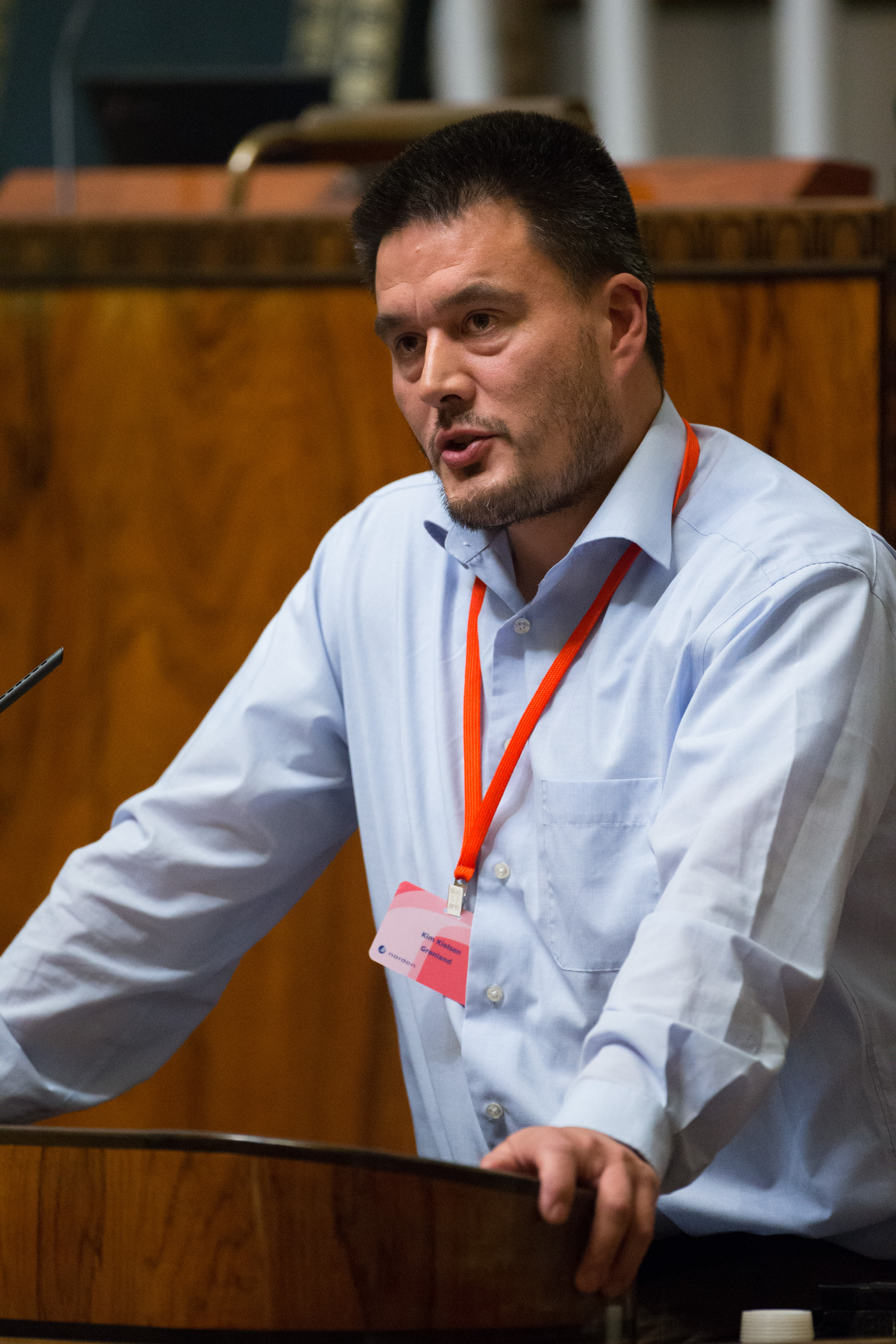
- Date formed: 5 October 2018
- Date dissolved: 9 April 2019

People and organisations
- Head of state: Margrethe II of Denmark
- Head of government: Kim Kielsen
- Member party: Forward (Siumut) S Solidarity (Atassut) A Descendants of Our Country (Nunatta Qitornai) NQ
- Status in legislature: Minority (coalition)
- Opposition party: Democrats (Demokraatit) D Community of the People (Inuit Ataqatigiit) IA; Cooperation Party (Suleqatigiissitsisut) SA; Point of Orientation Party (Partii Naleraq) PN
- Opposition leader: Niels Thomsen; Sara Olsvig

History
- Election: 2018 general election
- Legislature term: 2018-2022
- Predecessor: Kielsen IV Cabinet
- Successor: Kielsen VI Cabinet

The Fifth Cabinet of Kim Kielsen was the Government of Greenland in office from 5 October 2018 to April 2019. It was a coalition minority government consisting of the Siumut (Forward), Atassut (Solidarity) and Nunatta Qitornai (Descendants of Our Country) parties.

== List of ministers ==
The social democratic Siumut had six ministers, including the Premier. The liberal-conservative Atassut had two ministers. The centre-left Nunatta Qitornai had one minister.

Cabinet members
Portfolio	Minister	Took office	Left office	Party
The Premier's Office
Premier of Greenland	Kim Kielsen	10 December 2014	9 April 2019	Siumut
Minister for Education, Culture, Church and Foreign Affairs	Ane Lone Bagger	05 October 2018	9 April 2019	Siumut
Minister for Health, Social Affairs and Justice	Doris J. Jensen	26 October 2016	9 April 2019	Siumut
Minister for Finance and Nordic Cooperation	Vittus Qujaukitsoq	11 May 2018	9 April 2019	Nunatta Qitornai
Minister for Mineral Resources, Labour	Erik Jensen	11 May 2018	9 April 2019	Siumut
Minister for Fisheries, Hunting and Agriculture	Nikkulaat Jeremiassen	5 October 2018	9 April 2019	Siumut
Minister for Industry and Energy	Aqqalu Jeremiassen	11 May 2018	9 April 2019	Atassut
Minister for Housing and Infrastructure	Simon Simonsen	11 May 2018	9 April 2019	Siumut
Minister for Nature, Environment and Science	Siverth K. Heilmann	11 May 2018	9 April 2019	Atassut

== Party breakdown ==
Party breakdown of cabinet ministers:

- Forward (Social Democrats)
6
- Solidarity (Liberals)
2
- Descendants of Our Country (Social Democrats)
1

== See also ==
- Cabinet of Greenland

Preceded by Kielsen IV	Cabinet of Greenland; 2018–2019	Succeeded by Kielsen VI
