= List of political parties in Greenland =

This is a list of political parties in Greenland, as of 11 March 2025. Greenland has a multi-party system.

== Active parties ==
Logo	Name	Abbr.	Ideology	Position	Leader	Founded	Representation			National affiliation
Logo	Name	Abbr.	Ideology	Position	Leader	Founded	Inatsisartut (2025)	Municipalities (2025)	Folketing (Greenland seats)	National affiliation
	Democrats; Demokraatit	D	Liberalism; Social liberalism; Soft Greenlandic independence; Historically: Greenlandic unionism	Centre to centre-right	Jens-Frederik Nielsen	28 November 2002	10 / 31	21 / 81	0 / 2	Liberal Alliance
	Naleraq	N	Greenlandic nationalism Unilateralism; Populism	Centre to centre-right	Pele Broberg	8 March 2014	8 / 31	9 / 81	1 / 2	—N/a
	Inuit Ataqatigiit	IA	Democratic socialism Greenlandic independence Environmentalism; Left-wing nationalism	Left-wing	Múte Bourup Egede	21 November 1978	7 / 31	16 / 81	1 / 2	—N/a
	Forward; Siumut	S	Social democracy Greenlandic independence	Centre-left	Erik Jensen	29 July 1977	4 / 31	31 / 81	0 / 2	Social Democrats
	Atassut	A	Liberal conservatism Market liberalism Nordic agrarianism Greenlandic unionism	Centre-right	Aqqalu Jerimiassen	29 April 1978	2 / 31	4 / 81	0 / 2	Venstre
	Qulleq	Q	Greenlandic independence Greenlandic nationalism Pro-Oil industry	Single-issue	Karl Ingemann	March 2023	0 / 31	0 / 81	0 / 2	—N/a

== Dissolved parties (since 1979) ==
- Labour Party
- Women's Party
- Polar Party
- Centre Party (Greenland)
- Roots Party
- Association of Candidates
- People's Party
- Nunatta Qitornai
- Cooperation Party

== Parties before 1975 (mostly very shortlived) ==
- Grønlands kommunistisk parti (1946)
- Grønlands Radikale Borgerparti (1954/55)
- Grønlands Socialdemokratiske Parti (1955)
- Inuit-parti (1963)
- Sukaq (1970)
