= Kielsen III Cabinet =

Government of Greenland (2016–2018)

Kim Kielsen III
- 16th Cabinet of Greenland
- Incumbent
- Date formed: 27 October 2016
- Date dissolved: 15 May 2018

People and organisations
- Head of state: Margrethe II of Denmark
- Head of government: Kim Kielsen
- Member party: Siumut, Naleraq, Inuit Ataqatigiit
- Status in legislature: Majority (coalition)

History
- Election: 2014 general election
- Legislature term: 2014-2018
- Predecessor: Kielsen Cabinet II
- Successor: Kielsen Cabinet IV

The Third Cabinet of Kim Kielsen was the Government of Greenland, in office between 27 October 2016 and 15 May 2018, where it was dissolved following a general election. It was a coalition majority government consisting of Siumut, Inuit Ataqatigiit and Partii Naleraq.

== List of ministers ==
The Social Democratic Siumut had 5 ministers including the Premier. The Socialistic Inuit Ataqatigiit had 4 ministers. The Centrist party had 1 minister.

Cabinet members
Portfolio	Minister	Took office	Left office	Party
The Premier's Office
Premier of Greenland	Kim Kielsen	10 December 2014	15 May 2018	Siumut
Minister for Social Welfare, Family, Gender Equality and Justice	Sara Olsvig	26 October 2016	15 May 2018	Inuit Ataqatigiit
Minister for Industry, Labour, Trade, and Energy	Hans Enoksen	26 October 2016	15 May 2018	Naleraq
Minister for Fisheries and Hunting	Karl-Kristian Kruse	26 October 2016	15 May 2018	Siumut
Minister for Finance And Taxes	Aqqaluaq B. Egede	26 October 2016	15 May 2018	Inuit Ataqatigiit
Minister for Education, Culture, Research and Church	Doris Jakobsen	26 October 2016	15 May 2018	Siumut
Minister for Health and Nordic Cooperation	Agathe Fontain	26 October 2016	15 May 2018	Inuit Ataqatigiit
Minister for Independence, Foreign Affairs and Agriculture	Suka K. Frederiksen	26 October 2016	15 May 2018	Siumut
Minister for Municipalities, Settlements, Outlying Districts, Infrastructure and Housing	Erik Jensen	26 October 2016	15 May 2018	Siumut
Minister for Mineral Resources	Múte Bourup Egede	26 October 2016	15 May 2018	Inuit Ataqatigiit

== Party breakdown ==
Party breakdown of cabinet ministers:

- Forward (Social Democrats)
5
- Community of the People (Socialists)
4
- Point of Orientation Party (Centrists)
1

== See also ==
- Cabinet of Greenland

Preceded by Kielsen II	Cabinet of Greenland; 2016–2018	Succeeded by Kielsen IV
