= Kielsen IV Cabinet =

Government of Greenland (2018)

Kielsen's Fourth Cabinet
- 17th Cabinet of Greenland

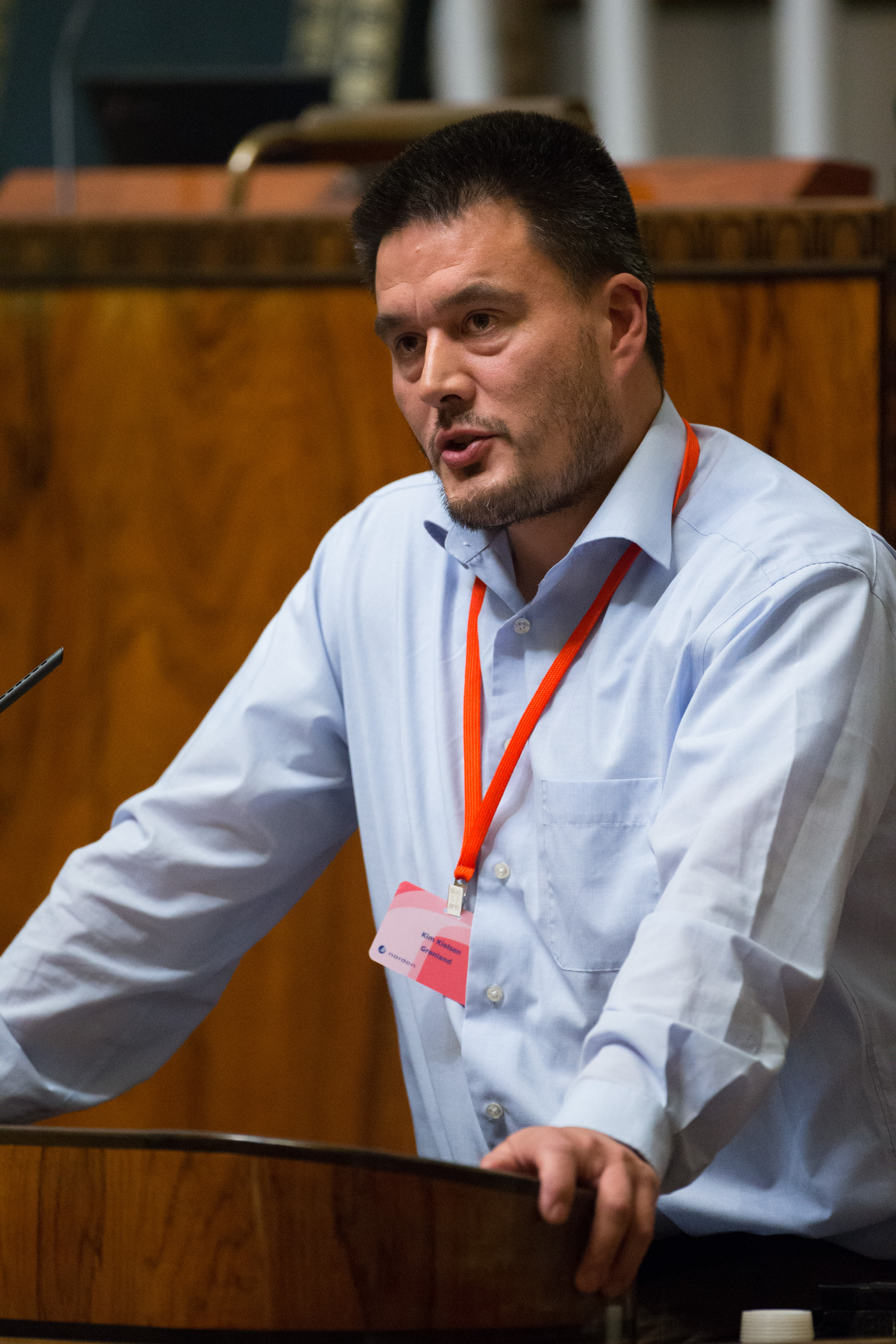
- Kim Kielsen
- Date formed: 15 May 2018
- Date dissolved: 5 October 2018

People and organisations
- Monarch: Margrethe II of Denmark
- Prime Minister: Kim Kielsen
- Member parties: Siumut; Atassut; Nunatta Qitornai; Partii Naleraq
- Status in legislature: Majority (coalition)

History
- Election: 2014 general election
- Legislature term: 2014-2018
- Predecessor: Kielsen III Cabinet
- Successor: Kielsen V Cabinet

The Fourth Cabinet of Kim Kielsen was the Government of Greenland, in office between 15 May 2018 and 5 October 2018, where the coalition collapsed with the party Partii Naleraq leaving the coalition following a dispute of the funding of new international airports. It was a coalition majority government consisting of Siumut, Atassut, Nunatta Qitornai and Partii Naleraq.

== See also ==
- Cabinet of Greenland

Preceded by Kielsen III	Cabinet of Greenland; 2018	Succeeded by Kielsen V
