= Jess Svane =

Greenlandic politician

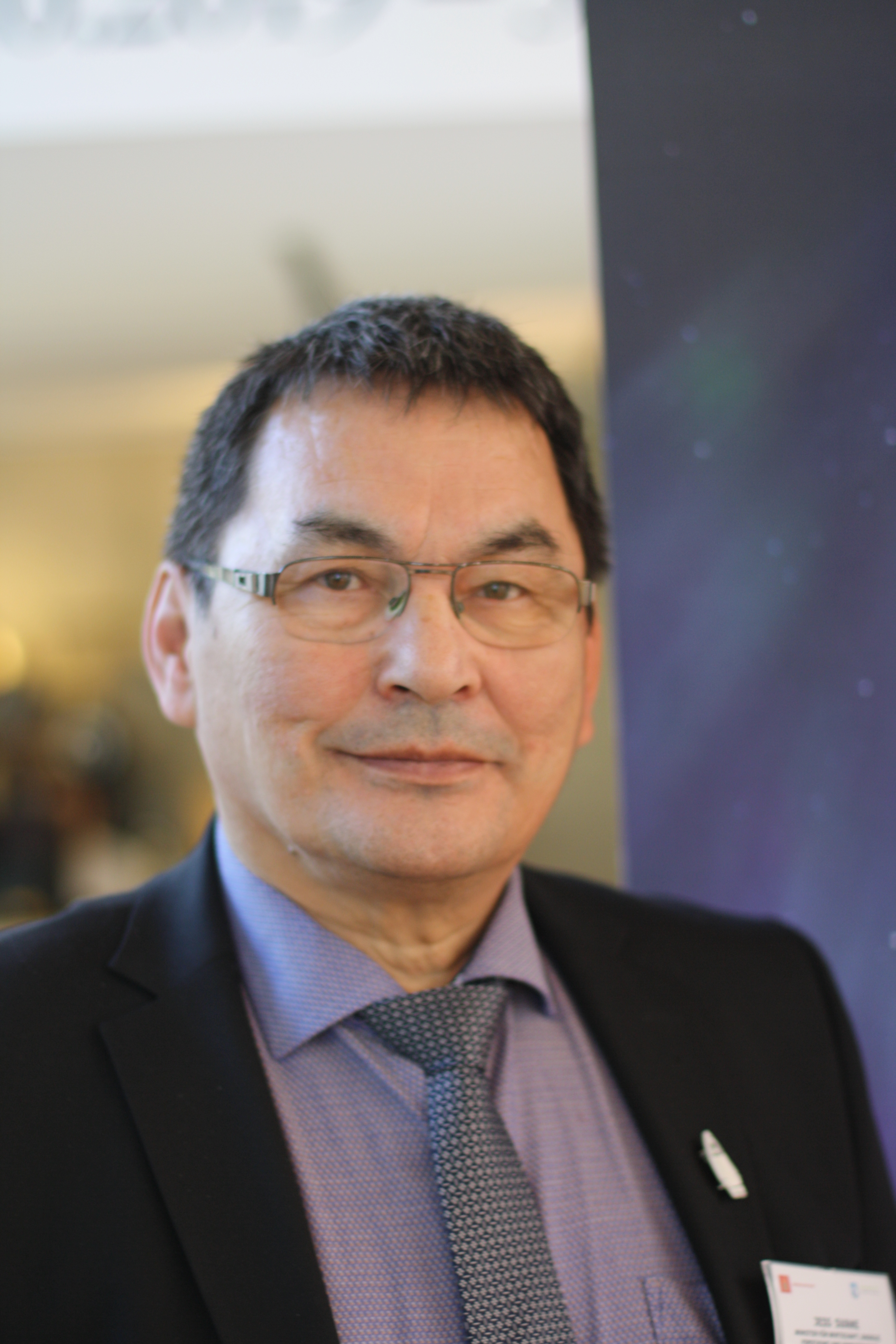

Personal details
- Born: Jess Kristian Svane; 5 May 1959 (age 66) Qasigiannguit, Greenland, Kingdom of Denmark
- Citizenship: Kingdom of Denmark
- Party: Siumut

Jess Kristian Svane (born 5 May 1959) is a Greenlandic politician (Siumut).

== Early life and career ==
Svane was born on 5 May 1959 in Qasigiannguit. Before his political career, he worked primarily in the commercial sector. Between 1992 and 2001 he was the port manager of Qasigiannguit before becoming self-employed in 2004. He and his wife Emilie have four children.

== Political career ==
Svane was appointed mayor of the municipality of Qasigiannguit after the 2005 local elections, in which he received 74 votes. In the parliamentary election in the same year he missed entry into Inatsisartut with 69 votes. In the 2008 local elections, he received the most votes from his party in his constituency and subsequently became the first mayor of Qaasuitsup, which was founded on 1 January 2009. He was unable to defend his mayoral position in the 2013 local elections because he received 363 fewer votes than his party colleague Ole Dorph with 413.

Svane therefore ran in the 2014 parliamentary election the next year and came in first for his party with 172 votes, so that he ultimately moved up to Inatsisartut for Minister Doris Jakobsen. In the 2017 local elections, he defended his place in the local council with 185 votes, but due to the administrative reform he is now in the council of the Qeqertalik municipality.

In the 2018 parliamentary election, Svane again achieved first place in the Siumut with 161 and this time slipped into parliament for Minister Erik Jensen. In April 2019 he was appointed Minister for Labor, Energy and Research in the Kielsen V Cabinet. On November 22, 2019, he took over the labor market portfolio from Jensen, who resigned. In May 2020 he was appointed Minister for Labor Market, Research and Environment in the Kielsen VI Cabinet.

Svane was re-elected to Inatsisartut in the 2021 parliamentary election. However, he did not run in the 2021 local elections. When Siumut became part of the government again on 5 April 2022, Svane was appointed Minister for Social Affairs, Interior and Labor Market in the Second Egede cabinet. On 25 September 2023, he was assigned to the family portfolio of Aqqaluaq B. Egede.
