= Anna Wangenheim =

Greenlandic politician

Minister of Health and Disability
- Incumbent
- Assumed office 7 April 2025
- Prime Minister: Jens-Frederik Nielsen
- Preceded by: Mimi Karlsen

Member of the Greenlandic Parliament
- In office 1 August 2019 – 25 September 2020
- Incumbent
- Assumed office 8 February 2021

Personal details
- Born: August 1982 (age 43) Narsaq, Greenland, Kingdom of Denmark
- Citizenship: Kingdom of Denmark
- Party: Demokraatit

Anna Wangenheim (née Mikkelsen; born August 1982) is a Greenlandic politician representing the Demokraatit party in Greenland's parliament, the Inatsisartut.

== Early life and career ==
Anna Wangenheim is the middle of three daughters of Danish carpenter Henning Mikkelsen and Greenlandic hospital administrator Karline Kristiansen, a daughter of the sheep farmer Abel Kristiansen. Through her mother, she is the niece of Benedikte Thorsteinsson (b. 1950) and cousin of Vittus Qujaukitsoq (b. 1971). Her mother died of cancer when Anna was 18 and her father also had cancer three years later. After her father actually wanted her to become a nurse, she began studying journalism at the journalism school in Nuuk after graduating from school in 2003 due to her parents' illnesses. However, she dropped out after a year because of her father's death. From 2004 to 2006, she was an assistant teacher in Narsaq. After the birth of her daughter and the separation from her father, she moved to Denmark where she worked as a production technologist in Aarhus from 2006 to 2008. She then trained as a nurse at the University College of Southern Denmark. She married while she was studying and had two more sons and her husband's three stepchildren before the marriage ended in divorce. After graduating in 2014, she worked as a nurse in Denmark before returning to Narsaq after the divorce, but soon moved back to Denmark out of disappointment before moving to Nuuk in December 2016.

== Political career ==
After her parents, who belonged to the Atassut, had awakened her political interest early on, Wangenheim joined the Demokraatit after her return to Greenland in 2017 and became the regional chair of the Demokraatit in the western part of the municipality of Sermersooq in December of the same year. She stood as a candidate in the 2018 parliamentary election. She came second in the Demokraatit. In August 2019, she replaced the resigned Randi Vestergaard Evaldsen in the Inatsisartut while Niels Thomsen was on leave. In November 2019, she became a permanent member with the resignation of Niels Thomsen. In May 2020, she was appointed Health Minister in the Kielsen VI Cabinet. In February 2021, the Demokraatit left the government and she resigned as a minister. In the subsequent 2021 parliamentary election, she received the most votes of all Demokraatit candidates, including more than party leader Jens Frederik Nielsen, and thus moving directly into the Inatsisartut for the first time.
