= Tillie Martinussen =

Greenlandic politician

Tillie Martinussen (born 1980) is a Greenlandic politician of the Cooperation Party. She was a member of the Inatsisartut, Greenland's parliament, from 2018 to 2021. She helped form the Cooperation Party in 2018, and was the only member of the party to be represented in the Inatsisartut from that year's election; she did not return to parliament after the 2021 election. She is an opponent to Greenlandic independence.

== Early life ==
Tillie Martinussen was born in the summer of 1980 in Nuuk. When she was seven, there was a commotion in her home, and her parents divorced. She was then placed in an orphanage in Denmark. She does not speak Kalaallisut.

== Career ==
Martinussen helped found the Cooperation Party in 2018. She was elected in the 2018 Greenlandic general election to the Inatsisartut as the only member of the party. She has been the chairwoman of the Cooperation Party since December 2020, having been the acting chair since 2018. In 2020, the party's regional branch in Sermersooq expressed distrust of her, saying that she allegedly used party funds for private expenses to a "shockingly large extent", including cosmetics, restaurant visits, and grocery shopping.

In the run-up to the 2021 Greenlandic general election, she said her party will focus on business development, expansions in social welfare, and increase taxes. She believes that those who criticize colonialism are Denmark-residing Greenlandic youth, and that defacing a statue of Hans Egede—a missionary in Greenland during the eighteenth century—with calls of decolonisation is met with skepticism by those who live in Greenland. She is a staunch critic of Greenlandic independence, who wishes to privatise a share of state-owned companies. Her party won no seats, and she did not return to the Inatsisartut. Her internal party revolt due to the expenses controversy may have cost them the election. Ultimately, those who criticised her were expelled from the party.
