= Pitsi Høegh =

Greenlandic politician (born 1964)

Member of the Greenlandic Parliament
- In office 2014–2018

Personal details
- Born: 15 March 1964 (age 62) Qaqortoq, Greenland, Kingdom of Denmark
- Citizenship: Kingdom of Denmark
- Party: Siumut

Pitsi Høegh (born 15 March 1964) is a Greenlandic tourism businesswoman and politician affiliated with Siumut.

== Early life and career ==
Høegh grew up in Alluitsup Paa. She graduated from Niuernermik Ilinniarfik in Nuuk in 1983. From 1994 to 2004 she worked as a department head at Arctic Umiaq Line and later as head of tourism in Qaqortoq. In 2008 she and her husband Kenneth Høegh (born 1966) started their own business and founded the tourism company Greenland Sagalands.

== Political career ==
Høegh ran for office in the 2014 parliamentary election and received 125 votes, which meant the fourth place for the Siumut. From there, she became a member of Inatsisartut at the autumn session of 2017, representing Anders Olsen. She also ran in the 2015 Folketing election, but only received 393 votes, the fewest of the five Siumut candidates. In the 2018 parliamentary election, she received 76 votes and thus missed a parliamentary seat. In 2020, she was appointed a board member of Visit Greenland, which was seen by her replacement, Maliina Abelsen, as a political move by Kim Kielsen for his re-election as party leader of Siumut. In the 2021 parliamentary election, she only received 55 votes and again missed a parliamentary seat.
