= Doris Jensen =

Doris Jensen may refer to:

- Coleen Gray (Doris Bernice Jensen, 1922–2015), American actress
- Doris J. Jensen (born 1978), Greenlandic politician
