= Badminton at the 2015 Island Games =

Badminton, for the 2015 Island Games, was held at the New Gilson Hall. It is located in Saint Martin, Jersey. With a practice day on 27 June, the events took place from 28 June to 3 July 2015.

== Medal table ==
Final medal tally, based on the 2015 IG Badminton Medal Table page:

* Host nation (Jersey)

Rank	Nation	Gold	Silver	Bronze	Total
1	Jersey*	2	0	1	3
2	Faroe Islands	1	2	2	5
3	Isle of Man	1	1	1	3
4	Gotland	1	1	0	2
5	Greenland	1	0	0	1
6	Menorca	0	1	0	1
6	Shetland	0	1	0	1
8	Guernsey	0	0	2	2
Totals (8 entries)		6	6	6	18

=== Medal summary ===
Event	Gold	Silver	Bronze
Men's singles	Mark Constable (JEY)	Niclas H. Eysturoy (FRO)	Benjamin Gunnarstein (FRO)
Men's doubles	Greenland; Bror Madsen; Jens Frederik Nielsen	Menorca; Albert Navarro Comes; Eric Navarro Comes	Jersey; Mark Constable; Alexander Hutchings
Women's singles	Rannvá Djurhuus Carlsson (FRO)	Cristen Marritt (IOM)	Chloe Le Tissier (GGY)
Women's doubles	Isle of Man; Kimberley Clague; Cristen Marritt	Gotland; Caroline Gate; Viktoria Olsson Meimermondt	Faroe Islands; Brynhild Djurhuus Carlsson; Rannvá Djurhuus Carlsson
Mixed doubles	Gotland; Björn Eriksson; Caroline Gate	Shetland; Gordon Keith; Shona Mackay	Guernsey; Charlotte Barnes; Matthew Haynes
Team	Jersey; Mariana Agathangelou; Moira Ashby; Mark Constable; Jade Coombs-Goodfellow; Kerry Coombs-Goodfellow; Colin Hardwidge; Alexander Hutchings; David Luce; Jon Southern; Emily Temple-Redshaw	Faroe Islands; Brynhild Djurhuus Carlsson; Rannvá Djurhuus Carlsson; Magnus Dal-Christiansen; Kristina Eriksen; Niclas H. Eysturoy; Benjamin Gunnarstein; Sólfríð Hjørleifsdóttir; Gunnva K. Jacobsen; Askel Eli Poulsen; Bartal Poulsen	Isle of Man; Laura Beggs; Jonathan Callow; Kimberley Clague; Adam Colley; Neil Harding; Abigail Li; Jessica Li; Cristen Marritt; Matthew Nicholson; Bailie Watterson
