= Katti Frederiksen =

Greenlandic writer, poet and politician

Minister of Education, Culture and Church of Greenland
- In office 5 November 2020 – 23 April 2021
- Preceded by: Ane Lone Bagger

Personal details
- Born: 12 March 1982 (age 44) Narsaq, Greenland
- Party: Siumut

Katti Frederiksen (born 12 March 1982) is a Greenlandic writer, poet, linguist and politician (Siumut).

== Biography ==
Frederiksen was born in 1982 to sheep farmer Sofus Frederiksen and politician Suka K. Frederiksen (1965–2020). She grew up in Narsaq, but moved to Nuuk in 2004 to study language, literature and media at the University of Greenland. After completing her bachelor's degree in 2007, she obtained her candidate's degree there in 2011, partly after a stay abroad at the University of Alaska Fairbanks. From 2007 to 2008, Frederiksen worked as a Greenlandic language high school teacher. From 2008 to 2015, she worked at Oqaasileriffik, which she then took over until 2020. She is the owner of the children's book publishing house Iperaq. From 2018 to 2020 she ran a café in Nuuk.

In 2006, Frederiksen published the collection of poems and novellas Uummatima kissaa (Warmness of my heart). In 2012, she published her second volume of poetry, 100% ~~Eskimo~~ Inuk. Her poems deal with the Greenlandic language and the Greenlanders' sense of identity.

On 5 November 2020, she was appointed Minister for Education, Culture and Church in the Kielsen VII Cabinet, succeeding Ane Lone Bagger, who had resigned in the summer, without having previously stood as a candidate in elections.

In 2021 Frederiksen was awarded the international Vigdís prize for culture, named after former president of Iceland Vigdís Finnbogadóttir. The award is conferred for outstanding contributions to world languages and cultures.

== Personal life ==
Frederiksen is the mother of three children. She is also one of the best marathon runners in the country.
