= Aleqa Hammond =

Prime Minister of Greenland from 2013 to 2014

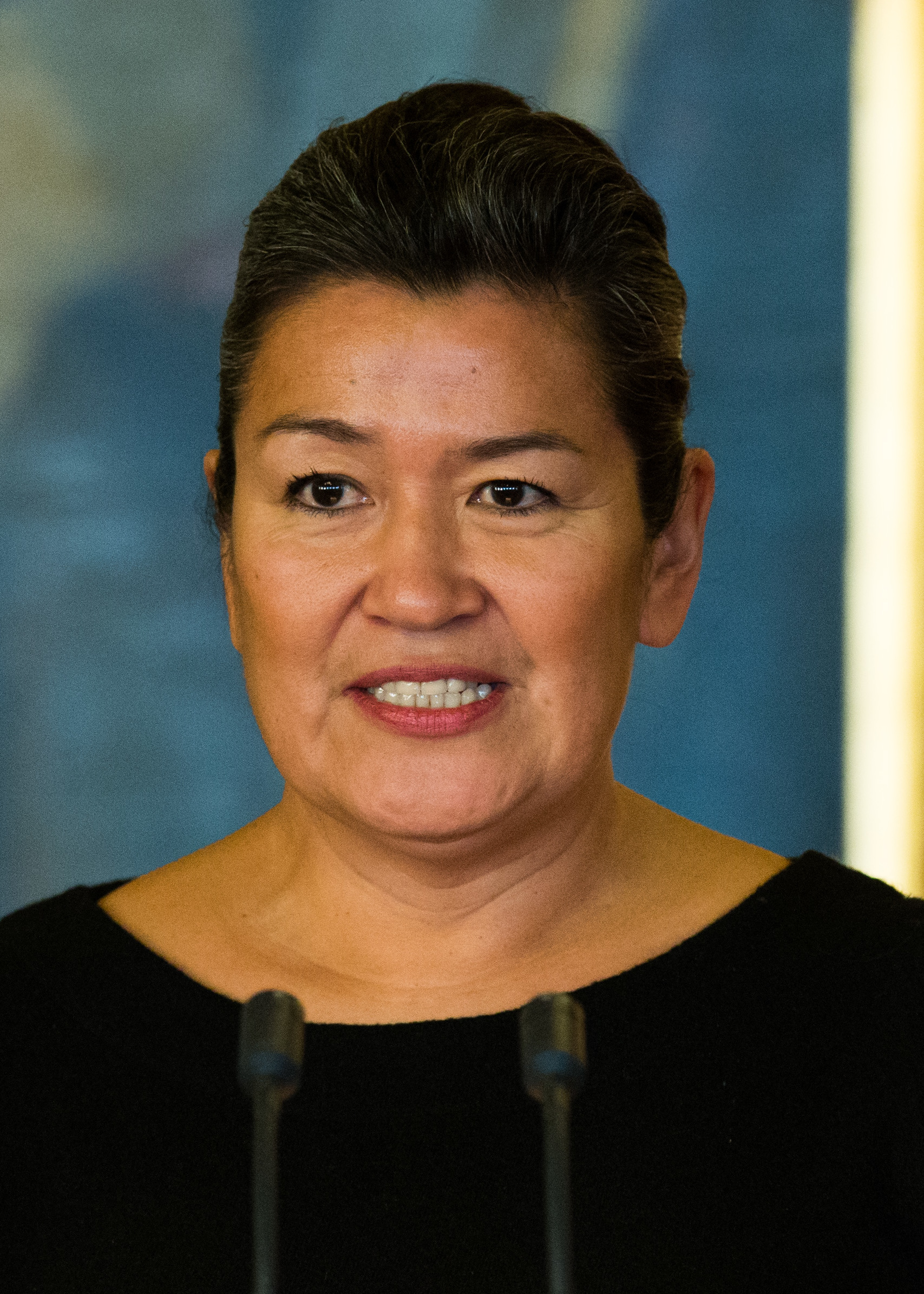
- Hammond in 2013

Prime Minister of Greenland
- In office 5 April 2013 – 30 September 2014
- Monarch: Margrethe II
- Deputy: Doris Jakobsen
- Preceded by: Kuupik Kleist
- Succeeded by: Kim Kielsen

Leader of Siumut
- Incumbent
- Assumed office 29 June 2025
- Preceded by: Vivian Motzfeldt
- In office 2 June 2009 – 17 October 2014
- Deputy: Hans Enoksen
- Preceded by: Hans Enoksen
- Succeeded by: Kim Kielsen

Member of the Danish Parliament for Greenland
- In office 18 June 2015 – 5 June 2019
- Preceded by: Doris Jakobsen

Personal details
- Born: 23 September 1965 (age 61) Narsaq, County of Greenland, Denmark
- Citizenship: Kingdom of Denmark
- Party: Siumut (until 2016; from 2021)
- Other political affiliations: Independent (2016–2018); Nunatta Qitornai (2018–2021)
- Education: Nunavut Arctic College
- Alma mater: University of Greenland (dropped out)
- Website: Official Facebook

Aleqa Hammond (born 23 September 1965) is a Greenlandic politician who was the prime minister of Greenland from 2013 to 2014. She is the current leader of Siumut, since 2025, and previously served as leader from 2009 to 2014. She is the first female prime minister of Greenland.

First elected to the Inatsisartut (Parliament of Greenland) in 2005, Hammond was a cabinet minister in the government of Hans Enoksen from 2005 until 2008. After Siumut's defeat in the 2009 election, Hammond became party leader and led the party to victory in the 2013 election. In 2014 she stepped down as prime minister and leader of Siumut, following a case of misuse of public funds.

Hammond was elected to the Danish Folketing (parliament) in 2015. She was expelled from Siumut in 2016 after yet another case of misuse of public funds and sat as an independent. In 2018, she announced that she would be running in the 2018 Greenlandic election for the Siumut breakaway Nunatta Qitornai, but failed to be elected. Hammond returned to Siumut in 2021, and was elected its leader in 2025.

== Early life ==
Born in Narsaq, Hammond grew up in Uummannaq. Her father Piitaaraq Johansen died on a hunting trip when she was seven after falling through the ice. She attended Nunavut Arctic College in Iqaluit between 1989 and 1991, before studying at the University of Greenland from 1991 until 1993. Her studies were never completed.

In 1993, she began working for Greenland Tourism as a Regional Co-ordinator in Disko Bay. In 1994, she used a hotel room and knowingly supplied a credit card which had been blocked (from prior abuse) to cover the kr 5,000 bill, and she was convicted of fraud in 1996. In 1995, she became the Information Officer in the Cabinet secretariat, before working for Nuuk Tourism from 1996 until 1999. Between 1999 and 2003, she was commissioner of the Inuit Circumpolar Council, and also worked on the 2002 Arctic Winter Games. From 2004 to 2005 she worked in the tourism industry in Qaqortoq as a tourist guide.

== Political career ==
She was first elected to the Parliament of Greenland in November 2005, and was appointed Minister for Families and Justice. In 2007, she became Minister of Finance and Foreign Affairs, but resigned in 2008 officially in protest of the size of the government's budget deficit.

After Siumut lost the 2009 election, she replaced Hans Enoksen as party leader. In the 2013 election, Siumut emerged as the largest parliamentary faction, and Hammond became prime minister. Hammond also received the highest-ever number of personal votes. As prime minister she expressed her hope to experience Greenland becoming an independent country. She said: "We are talking about building a nation on a mental level. We will stand up as a people and demand what is rightfully ours. We will take responsibility for ourselves and for our families. And as politicians we will take responsibility for our country". On 1 October 2014, Hammond took a leave of absence because she was being investigated for an expense scandal, and Kim Kielsen became acting prime minister, and also succeeded her as leader of the Siumut party. Kielsen later permanently replaced her.

In 2015, Hammond was elected to the Danish Folketing in that year's general election. With 3,745 votes, she gained the highest number of personal votes in Greenland. She was expelled from Siumut on 23 August 2016 following a case of abuse of her Folketing credit card for private expenses and became an independent. In 2017, she became chairman of the Greenland Committee following an agreement to support the centre-right government.

On 31 March 2018, Hammond announced her candidacy for the Greenlandic parliament for Siumut breakaway Nunatta Qitornai, but was not elected in the 2021 election. Nunatta Qitornai was subsequently disbanded, and Hammond returned to Siumut shortly afterwards. On June 29, 2025 she was elected as Siumut's chairperson.

== Personal life ==
She is a member of the New Apostolic Church.

Party political offices
Preceded by Hans Enoksen	Leader of Siumut; 2009–2014	Succeeded by Kim Kielsen
Political offices
Preceded by Kuupik Kleist	Prime Minister of Greenland; 2013–2014	Succeeded by Kim Kielsen
