= Naalakkersuisut =

Government of Greenland

The Naalakkersuisut or the Government of Greenland (Danish: Grønlands Regering) is the chief executive body, the cabinet and the government of Greenland since the island became self-governing in 1979. As an autonomous territory of the Kingdom of Denmark, Greenland is a parliamentary representative democratic territory, in which the premier (Naalakkersuisut Siulittaasuat) leads the cabinet, and of a multi-party system.

There are currently 10 members of the Cabinet, known as "Ministers" (Naalakkersuisoq), all of whom are also heads of specific government ministries. The ministers are appointed by the Prime Minister. The Greenlandic government currently consists of 10 ministers including the Prime Minister.

== Executive power ==
Executive power rests with a high commissioner, and a prime minister heads the Cabinet. The high commissioner of Greenland since 2011 is appointed by the monarch (King Frederik X), and the prime minister is elected indirectly by parliament elections results for four-year terms.

== Current cabinet ==
The Naalakkersuisut is divided into a number of areas of responsibility each led by a Naalakkersuisoq (English: Minister) with powers corresponding to that of a minister or secretary of government. The cabinet is based on a coalition in the Inatsisartut of the parties Democrats with the support of Inuit Ataqatigiit, Siumut, and Atassut. Since 28 March 2025, the current composition of the Naalakkersuisut is as follows:

Portfolio	Minister	Took office	Left office	Party	Ref
The Premier's Office
Premier of Greenland	Jens-Frederik Nielsen	28 March 2025	Incumbent	Democrats	
Minister of Finance and Taxation	Múte B. Egede	28 March 2025	Incumbent	Inuit Ataqatigiit	
Minister of Foreign Affairs and Research/Science	Múte B. Egede	14 April 2026	Incumbent	Inuit Ataqatigiit	
Minister of Foreign Affairs and Research/Science	Vivian Motzfeldt	28 March 2025	13 March 2026	Siumut	
Minister of Education, Culture, Sports, Youth, and the Church	Nivi Olsen	28 March 2025	Incumbent	Democrats	
Minister of Industry, Raw Materials, Mining, Energy, Law Enforcement, and Equality	Naaja H. Nathanielsen	28 March 2025	Incumbent	Inuit Ataqatigiit	
Minister of Health and Disability	Anna Wangenheim	28 March 2025	Incumbent	Democrats	
Minister of Children, Youth and Families	Maasi Pedersen	28 March 2025	Incumbent	Inuit Ataqatigiit	
Minister of Fisheries and Aquaculture, Hunting, Agriculture, Self-Sustainability, and the Environment	Peter Borg	28 March 2025	Incumbent	Democrats	
Minister of Social Affairs, Employment/Labour Market, and Home Affairs	Bentiaraq Ottosen	28 March 2025	Incumbent	Atassut	
Minister of Housing, Infrastructure, and Outer Districts	Aqqaluaq B. Egede	28 March 2025	Incumbent	Inuit Ataqatigiit	

== Legislative power ==
Legislative power is shared by the government and the legislature. The legislature or Self-rule of Greenland (Greenlandic: Namminersorlutik Oqartussat, Danish: Selvstyre) is made up of 31 members in the Inatsisartut elected by direct, popular vote to serve four-year terms.

The composition following the 2025 general election, and lasting into 2029, is shown below:

Party	Votes	%	+/–	Seats	+/–
Democrats	8,563	30.26	+21.01	10	+7
Naleraq	7,009	24.77	+12.51	8	+4
Inuit Ataqatigiit	6,119	21.62	–15.82	7	–5
Siumut	4,210	14.88	–15.22	4	–6
Atassut	2,092	7.39	+0.31	2	0
Qulleq	305	1.08	New	0	New
Total	28,298	100.00	–	31	0
Valid votes	28,298	98.87			
Invalid/blank votes	322	1.13			
Total votes	28,620	100.00			
Registered voters/turnout	40,369	70.90	+4.98		
Source: Qinersineq.gl

Following the 2025 general election, the Democrats won the most seats (10) while Naleraq won the second most seats (8).

== Judicial power ==
The judiciary is independent of the executive and the legislature. Greenland has full autonomy on most matters, except on policies and decisions affecting the region including negotiations with the devolved legislatures and the Kingdom Parliament Folketing. Greenland's judicial system has mainly been derived from the Danish civil law system. It has one court of first instance: the Court of Greenland, and an appeal court the High Court of Greenland. No appeal is possible to decisions of the Joint Court of Justice, but fundamental "questions of law" may be submitted to the Østre Landsret and the Supreme Court of Denmark in cassation. Verdicts by those institutions may lead to a new decision of the Joint Court, taking into account the results of the cassation.

== History ==
=== Naalakkersuisut 2013 ===
Parliamentary elections were held on March 12, 2013, and Aleqa Hammond, leader of the Siumut party, was designated as prime minister by a coalition of the parties Siumut, Partii Inuit, and Atassut.

=== Naalakkersuisut 2014 ===
Parliamentary elections were held on 28 November 2014 and Kim Kielsen, leader of the Siumut party, was designated as prime minister by a coalition of the parties Siumut, Democrats, and Atassut. The coalition was formed on 4 December 2014, Siumut has five ministers, Democrats 2 and Attasut 2.

=== Naalakkersuisut 2016 ===
In late October 2016, the current government coalition was changed to consist of the parties Siumut (S), Inuit Ataqatigiit (IA), and Partii Naleraq (PN). The composition of the Naalakkersuisut was as follows:

Name	Party	Office
Kim Kielsen	Siumut	Premier, Minister for Domestic Affairs
Vittus Qujaukitsoq	Siumut	Minister for Industry, Labour, Trade, Energy, and Foreign Affairs
Martha Lund Olsen	Siumut	Minister for Municipalities Settlements, Infrastructure and Housing
Doris Jakobsen	Siumut	Minister for Education, Culture, Research and Church Affairs
Suka K. Frederiksen	Siumut	Minister for Independence, Environment and Nature and Agriculture
Aqqaluaq B. Egede	Inuit Ataqatigiit	Minister for Finance and Taxes
Sara Olsvig	Inuit Ataqatigiit	Minister for Family, Gender Equality, Social Affairs, and Justice
Agathe Fontain	Inuit Ataqatigiit	Minister for Health and Nordic Cooperation
Múte Bourup Egede	Inuit Ataqatigiit	Minister for Minerals
Hans Enoksen	Partii Naleraq	Minister for Hunting and Fishing
