= Benedikte Thorsteinsson =

Greenlandic politician (born 1950)

Minister for Social Affairs and Labor of Greenland
- In office 4 April 1995 – 19 September 1997

Personal details
- Born: 12 February 1950 (age 76) Eqaluit, Greenland

Benedikte "Bendó" Sara Nanna Thorsteinsson Abelsdóttir (née Kristiansen; born 12 February 1950) is a Greenlandic politician (Siumut).

== Early life ==
Benedikte Thorsteinsson is the tenth of fifteen children of the sheep breeder Abraham Terkild Abel Kristiansen (1918-?) and his wife Hanne Malene Dorthea Lise Rosing (1914-?), a sister of Nikolaj Rosing (1912-1976). She is the sister-in-law of the politician Ûssarĸak K'ujaukitsoĸ (1948-2018) and thus the aunt of Vittus Qujaukitsoq (* 1971). Another niece is Anna Wangenheim (born 1982). Her father was chairman of the sheep breeders' association he founded and was also active as a local politician.

== Personal life and career ==
Thorsteinsson attended high school in Køge, Denmark, which she graduated in 1970. There she met Icelander Guðmundur "Gujo" Þorsteinsson (* 1949), whom she married on 22 September 1971. The couple moved to Iceland that same year, where she trained as an office clerk. She has four children with her husband, including Inga Dóra G. Markussen. In 1984 the family moved to Qaqortoq, where Benedikte was employed by the municipal administration. From 1985 to 1988 she was the municipal apartment manager. From 1988 to 1989 she was a course leader at Sulisartut Højskoliat and then a specialist teacher at the business school in Qaqortoq until 1995. She worked as an advisor to the Icelandic consul in Greenland Pétur Ásgeirsson.

== Political career ==
From 1989 to 1995, Thorsteinsson was a member of the Qaqortoq Municipality Council, serving as Deputy Mayor. She stood as a candidate in the parliamentary elections in 1995, but failed to make it into parliament. Nevertheless, she was subsequently appointed Minister for Social Affairs and Labor in the Johansen II Cabinet. When Lars-Emil Johansen resigned as Prime Minister in 1997, Thorsteinsson was replaced by Mikael Petersen.

Together with her husband, she received the Icelandic Order of the Falcon in 2019.
