= Elections in Greenland =

Greenland elects a legislature on a national level. The Greenlandic Parliament (Greenlandic: Inatsisartut) has 31 members of parliament, elected for a four-year term by proportional representation. Greenland has a multi-party system with the political spectrum covering independence and unionism as well as left and right; as parties rarely have a chance of gaining power alone, they tend to work together in order to form a coalition government.

Greenland has held parliamentary elections since 1979 when the Home-Rule act came into force. When this happened the islands were broken off into eight constituencies: Central Greenland, South Greenland, North Greenland, Ittoqqortoormiit, Qaanaaq, Tasiilaq, Upernavik and Uumannaq. However, in 1998, they were all remerged back into one constituency due to a desire to consider Greenland's interests as a whole, instead of the regional interests. Due to the number of seats in Greenland's parliament it takes a minimum of sixteen seats to form a majority government. Also, terms can be cut short if a government finds a majority against it or if the sitting prime minister decides to call one, and this is fairly normal. For example, an election came unexpectedly in April 2021, as the administration that had been running since 2014 by Kim Kielsen of the Siumut Party, due to the withdrawal of one of its coalition partners, Demokraait.

One of the major debates in Greenland politics is whether to unionise or be independent. This debate divides parties and politicians between two poles. Greenland is currently one of two autonomous territories of the Kingdom of Denmark. This means that Greenland is a part of Denmark's international territory that has a degree of autonomy and self-governance under a national government. Some politicians in Greenland want to become fully independent from Denmark and stand under the independence side of Greenland's politics. On the other hand, some politicians want to keep a strong union with Denmark and remain an autonomous territory.

== Latest elections ==
=== General elections ===
Party	Votes	%	+/–	Seats	+/–
Democrats	8,563	30.26	+21.01	10	+7
Naleraq	7,009	24.77	+12.51	8	+4
Inuit Ataqatigiit	6,119	21.62	–15.82	7	–5
Siumut	4,210	14.88	–15.22	4	–6
Atassut	2,092	7.39	+0.31	2	0
Qulleq	305	1.08	New	0	New
Total	28,298	100.00	–	31	0
Valid votes	28,298	98.87			
Invalid/blank votes	322	1.13			
Total votes	28,620	100.00			
Registered voters/turnout	40,369	70.90	+4.98		
Source: Qinersineq.gl

=== By municipality ===
Municipality	Party by percentage:					
Municipality	A	D	IA	N	Q	S
Avannaata	8.6	29	11.5	33.7	0.5	16.3
Kujalleq	7.8	27.9	27	15.2	1.6	18.8
Qeqertalik	7.9	25.4	19.4	31.5	1.2	13.6
Sermersooq	6.1	33.5	26.9	18.5	0.6	13
Qeqqata	8.2	26.4	16.8	30.1	2.3	15.2

In the election held on Tuesday, 11 March 2025 the centre-right opposition Demokraatit achieved the largest share of the vote ahead of Naleraq (Point of Orientation independence party) and the two governing parties, the left-wing Inuit Ataqatigiit (Community of the People) and Siumut.

=== Local elections ===
Party	Votes	%	+/–	Seats	+/–
Siumut	7,323	33.97	▼2.15	31	Steady
Democrats	5,452	25.29	▲18.41	21	▲17
Inuit Ataqatigiit	4,663	21.63	▼15.89	16	▼16
Naleraq	2,409	11.17	▲0.49	9	▲1
Atassut	1,388	6.44	▼0.97	4	▼2
Qulleq	215	1.00	New	0	New
Independent	109	0.51	▲0.34	0	Steady
Total	21,559	100.00	–	81	0
Valid votes	21,559	98.82			
Invalid/blank votes	257	1.18			
Total votes	21,816	100.00			
Registered voters/turnout	41,435	52.65	▼11.19		
Source: Qinersineq.gl

== See also ==
- Electoral calendar
- Electoral system
