= Badminton at the 2019 Island Games =

- Venue: Europa Sports Complex – Sports Hall
- Dates: 7–12 July

Badminton, for the 2019 Island Games, held at the Europa Sports Complex - Sports Hall, Gibraltar in July 2019.

== Medal table ==
| Rank | Nation | Gold | Silver | Bronze | Total |
|---|---|---|---|---|---|
| 1 | Menorca | 2 | 0 | 0 | 2 |
| 2 | Guernsey | 1 | 3 | 3 | 7 |
| 3 | Isle of Man | 1 | 1 | 0 | 2 |
| 4 | Greenland | 1 | 0 | 3 | 4 |
| 5 | Saaremaa | 1 | 0 | 0 | 1 |
| 6 | Jersey | 0 | 2 | 0 | 2 |
| 7 | Faroe Islands | 0 | 0 | 5 | 5 |
| Totals (7 entries) | | 6 | 6 | 11 | 23 |

== Results ==
| Event | Gold | Silver | Bronze |
|---|---|---|---|
| Men's singles | Eric Navarro Comes; Menorca | Mark Constable; Jersey | Bartal Poulsen; Faroe Islands |
| Men's singles | Eric Navarro Comes; Menorca | Mark Constable; Jersey | Jens Frederik Nielsen; Greenland |
| Women's singles | Getter Saar; Saaremaa | Jessica Li; Isle of Man | Rannvá Djurhuus Carlsson; Faroe Islands |
| Women's singles | Getter Saar; Saaremaa | Jessica Li; Isle of Man | Gunnva Jacobsen; Faroe Islands |
| Men's doubles | Menorca; Albert Navarro Comes; Eric Navarro Comes | Jersey; Mark Constable; Alexander Hutchings | Guernsey; Paul Le Tocq; Ove Svejstrup |
| Men's doubles | Menorca; Albert Navarro Comes; Eric Navarro Comes | Jersey; Mark Constable; Alexander Hutchings | Guernsey; Stuart Hardy; Jordan Trebert |
| Women's doubles | Isle of Man; Kimberly Clague; Jessica Li | Guernsey; Elena Johnson; Chloe Le Tissier | Greenland; Milka Brønlund; Pilunnguaq Hegelund |
| Women's doubles | Isle of Man; Kimberly Clague; Jessica Li | Guernsey; Elena Johnson; Chloe Le Tissier | Greenland; Nina Høegh Møller; Sara Jacobsen |
| Mixed doubles | Guernsey; Emily Trebert; Jordan Trebert | Guernsey; Chloe Le Tissier; Paul Le Tocq | Guernsey; Elena Johnson; Ove Svejstrup |
| Mixed doubles | Guernsey; Emily Trebert; Jordan Trebert | Guernsey; Chloe Le Tissier; Paul Le Tocq | Faroe Islands; Rannvá Djurhuus Carlsson; Niklas Højgaard Eysturoy |
| Team | Greenland; Milka Brønlund; Frederik Elsner; Pilunnguaq Hegelund; Nina Høegh Møller; Sara Jacobsen; Toke Ketwa-Driefer; Jens-Frederik Nielsen; Taatsiannguaq Pedersen; Tina Rafaelsen; Sequssuna Schmidt | Guernsey; Carys Batiste; Stuart Hardy; Elena Johnson; Chloe Le Tissier; Paul Le Tocq; Bridget Podger; Ove Svejstrup; Emily Trebert; Jordan Trebert | Faroe Islands; Árant á Mýrini; Magnus Dal-Christiansen; Jónas Djurhuus; Rannvá Djurhuus Carlsson; Niklas Højgaard Eysturoy; Gunnva Jacobsen; Lena Maria Joensen; Adhya Nandi; Bartal Poulsen; Sissal Thomsen |
