= 2025 Greenlandic general election =

- 11 March 2025
- All 31 seats in the Inatsisartut; 16 seats needed for a majority
- Turnout: 70.90% (▲4.98pp)
Party	Leader	Vote %	Seats	+/–
Democrats	Jens-Frederik Nielsen	30.26	10	+7
Naleraq	Pele Broberg	24.77	8	+4
Inuit Ataqatigiit	Múte Bourup Egede	21.62	7	−5
Siumut	Erik Jensen	14.88	4	−6
Atassut	Aqqalu Jerimiassen	7.39	2	0
This lists parties that won seats. See the complete results below.
Most voted-for party by municipality and city (numbered circles)
Prime Minister before	Prime Minister after
Múte Bourup Egede; Inuit Ataqatigiit	Jens-Frederik Nielsen; Democrats

General elections were held in Greenland on 11 March 2025 to elect the 31 members of the Inatsisartut. The opposition Democrats won a plurality of ten seats.

== Background ==
Independence was the most important issue of the election. The government declared in February 2024 that independence was its goal. At a press conference in early 2025, pro-independence prime minister Múte Bourup Egede said that "work has already begun on creating the framework for Greenland as an independent state" and apparently hinted that an independence referendum could take place in April 2025, in tandem with the election. In addition to the five parties already represented in the Inatsisartut, a new sixth party with a primary focus on Greenlandic independence, Qulleq, gained ballot access a month before the election.

After United States president-elect Donald Trump renewed his interest in Greenland, Egede played down any notion of immediate independence and instead stressed the need for reforms of the cooperation between the governments of Denmark and Greenland at a press conference in Copenhagen on 10 January 2025. In an interview on Fox News on 16 January, Egede stated that Greenlanders have no wish to become a part of the United States, and an opinion poll that month showed 85% of those surveyed opposed the proposal with 6% in favour and 9% unsure. In the leadup to the election, the opposition leader Jens-Frederik Nielsen of the Democrats spoke in support for complete independence, telling Sky News that Greenland is "not for sale". In a final televised debate before the day before the election, the leaders of all five parties represented in the Inatsisartut voiced their distrust of Trump; only Karl Ingemann, leader of Qulleq, voiced trust in Trump.

Separate to the issue of independence, the economy was also an important theme, with debate over how is best to support commerce and industry, and ultimately strengthen the Greenlandic economy. Other issues included Greenland's relationship with international climate agreements, the functioning of the health care system, and social problems related to high house prices and homelessness.

In the run-up to the election, the Danish Security and Intelligence Service and the Danish Defence Intelligence Service announced they were actively monitoring for potential attempts by foreign powers to influence the outcome of the Greenlandic election. In an interview with TV 2, independent analysts named the United States, Russia, and China as possible instigators of clandestine operation in the country.

== Electoral system ==
The 31 members of the Inatsisartut are elected by an open list system of proportional representation in a single nationwide constituency. Seats are allocated using the d'Hondt method. While there is no formal threshold, parties need around 3% of total votes to gain seats.

== Participating parties ==
A total of six parties and 213 candidates participated in the elections:

Nr.	Party	Abbr.	Ideology	Candidates	Stance on independence
1	Inuit Ataqatigiit	IA	Greenlandic independence Democratic socialism Environmentalism	39	Gradual independence
2	Siumut	S	Greenlandic independence Social democracy	51	Gradual independence
3	Naleraq	N	Greenlandic independence Populism	62	Rapid independence
4	Democrats	D	Greenlandic independence Social liberalism	25	Gradual independence
5	Atassut	A	Greenlandic unionism Liberalism	20	Against independence
6	Qulleq	Q	Greenlandic independence Pro-Americanism	16	Rapid independence

=== Members standing down ===
Name	Party
Kalistat Lund	Inuit Ataqatigiit
Eqaluk Høegh	Inuit Ataqatigiit

== Opinion polls ==
Date	Polling firm	Sample size	S	IA	D	N	A	NQ	SA	Q	Lead
2025 election	Qinersineq.gl	—N/a	14.9%	21.6%	30.3%	24.8%	7.4%	—N/a	—N/a	1.1%	5.5%
22–27 Jan 2025	Verian	497	21.9%	31.0%	18.8%	16.5%	9.7%	—N/a	—N/a	—N/a	9.1%
2022 Danish election	Qinersineq.gl	—N/a	38.6%	25.2%	19.0%	12.6%	3.7%	—N/a	0.9%	—N/a	13.4%
2021 election	Qinersineq.gl	—N/a	30.1%	37.4%	9.25%	12.3%	7.1%	2.4%	1.4%	—N/a	7.3%

== Results ==
Party	Votes	%	+/–	Seats	+/–
Democrats	8,563	30.26	+21.01	10	+7
Naleraq	7,009	24.77	+12.51	8	+4
Inuit Ataqatigiit	6,119	21.62	–15.82	7	–5
Siumut	4,210	14.88	–15.22	4	–6
Atassut	2,092	7.39	+0.31	2	0
Qulleq	305	1.08	New	0	New
Total	28,298	100.00	–	31	0
Valid votes	28,298	98.87			
Invalid/blank votes	322	1.13			
Total votes	28,620	100.00			
Registered voters/turnout	40,369	70.90	+4.98		
Source: Qinersineq.gl

=== By municipality ===
Municipality	Party by percentage:					
Municipality	A	D	IA	N	Q	S
Avannaata	8.6	29	11.5	33.7	0.5	16.3
Kujalleq	7.8	27.9	27	15.2	1.6	18.8
Qeqertalik	7.9	25.4	19.4	31.5	1.2	13.6
Sermersooq	6.1	33.5	26.9	18.5	0.6	13
Qeqqata	8.2	26.4	16.8	30.1	2.3	15.2

== Analysis ==
The two governing parties, Inuit Ataqatigiit and Siumut, lost a combined 31 percentage points of the vote, marking a historic defeat for a Greenlandic coalition government similar to other democracies after the COVID-19 pandemic. The centre-right opposition Democrats won the most seats for the first time in its history, and it was expected they would form a coalition with one of the two currently governing parties, though environmental policies in relation to mining might be an issue that would vault Naleraq into government.

Inuit Ataqatigiit had been expected to win the election but instead suffered a significant decline. Originally dissatisfaction with Denmark over the spiral case dominated political feelings in Greenland, however fear of losing autonomy to the United States took more importance as the election progressed, especially after Trump stated he would not rule out taking the island by force. Nielsen, leader of the winning Democrats, argued that the results should be a clear message to the United States and Trump, stating: "We don’t want to be Americans. No, we don’t want to be Danes. We want to be Greenlanders. And we want our own independence in the future. And we want to build our own country by ourselves, not with his hope." Pele Broberg, leader of runner-up Naleraq, suggested in an op-ed to U.S. News & World Report that Greenland could take advantage of the situation to gain leverage in succession talks and maybe even gain the status of free associated state, similar to Micronesia or Palau's association with the United States (Compact of Free Association), to deal with the lack of military protection from Denmark that would happen upon independence. Qulleq, the newest party and the only one with a leader to voice trust in Trump, failed to win a single seat, receiving 305 votes.

Numerous areas where Siumut has traditionally been the strongest force, especially the villages, fell to Naleraq, a party which is popular with fishermen and hunters and takes the strongest pro-independence stance, while Demokraatit won numerous votes in the cities previously dominated by Inuit Ataqatigiit. The election result was interpreted as indicating that solving Greenland's internal social and economic problems took priority over achieving independence as quickly as possible. It was suspected that the extensive nationalization and monopolization, as well as the associated fisheries policy, had caused resentment among the population, who wanted a more liberal approach, while others were demonstrating their dissatisfaction with Denmark by voting for Naleraq. Kuno Fencker, a Naleraq member of Parliament, told The Guardian: "Before, people voted mostly Siumut – it was like a football club that they never left. But people have had enough and voted very differently this time."

== Reactions ==
Danish defense minister Troels Lund Poulsen congratulated the Democrats and said that the future of Greenland is up to Greenlanders, not the United States, while the prime minister Mette Frederiksen also congratulated the Democrats calling the results "a celebration of democracy". On 20 March, the Danish Defence Intelligence Service and the Danish Police Intelligence Service said that it had not found evidence of a systematic and coordinated campaign by a foreign government or foreign intelligence service to influence the election, while acknowledging that there was rampant misinformation on social media, including the creation of fake profiles pretending to be Danish or Greenlandic politicians and dissemination of false or manipulated information.

== Aftermath ==
Erik Jensen, leader of junior coalition partner Siumut resigned the day after the election. On 27 March 2025, the newspaper Sermitsiaq reported that a coalition agreement between all parties that won seats in the Inatsisartut, with the exception of Naleraq, had been reached. The coalition government was unveiled the next day, with Nielsen of the Democrats as its head.

== See also ==
- 2025 Greenlandic local elections
- Proposed United States acquisition of Greenland
