= Sukaq =

- Founder: Knud Hertling
- Founded: 1969
- Dissolved: 1970s
- Merged into: mainly to Siumut
- Ideology: Greenlandic nationalism Separatism

Sukaq was a short-lived nationalist political party in Greenland. Sukaq was the first political party in Greenland which was founded in 1969 by Knud Hertling. The party was dissolved in the 1970s.

The party's goal was to fight to increase Greenland's independence and its own home rule. True, Hertling and the party fought primarily for independence within the unity of the Realm, which the Faroe Islands had. However, when Hertling became Greenlandic minister in 1971, the party remained the only party in Greenland. When Hertling later found it difficult to cooperate with only one party, he chose to dissolve the party. When the Social Democratic party Siumut was established, many from Sukaq joined this party.

The word sukaq refers to the tentpole or mainstay of the traditional Greenlandic market houses.
