= Greenlandic independence =

Political movement

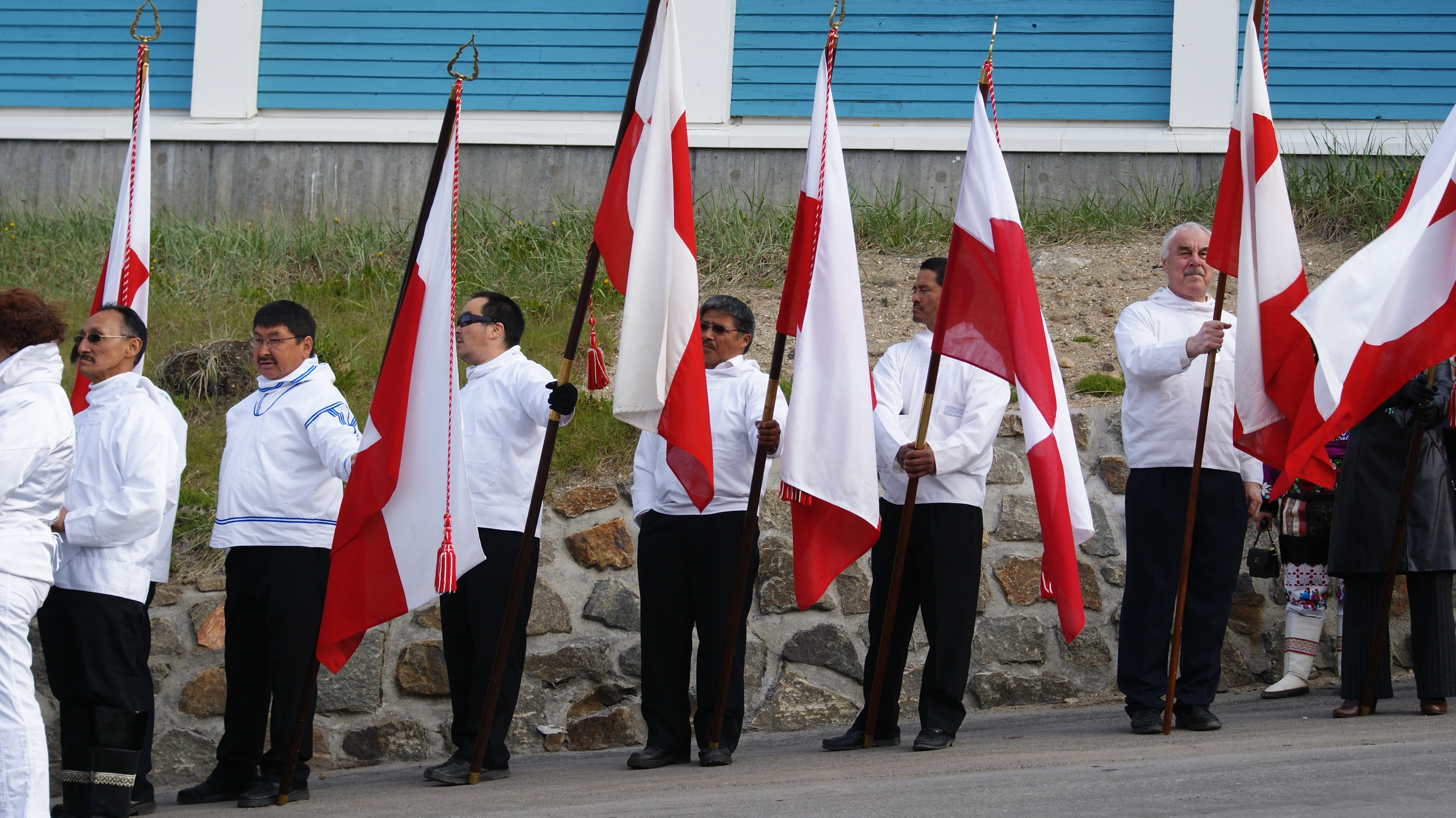
Greenland National Day 2010 celebration in Sisimiut on the first anniversary of the establishment of self-rule in 2009

Greenlandic independence (Greenlandic: Namminersulivinneq) is a nationalist political ambition of most political parties (such as Siumut, Inuit Ataqatigiit, Naleraq, and Nunatta Qitornai), advocacy groups, and individuals of Greenland, an autonomous territory within the Kingdom of Denmark, to become an independent sovereign state.

== Background ==
=== Norse and Inuit colonization ===
Greenland's present population are predominantly Inuit descended from the Thule people who migrated from the North American mainland in the 13th century AD, gradually colonizing the island. The Danish claim to the island stems from Norse settlement of southern Greenland which lasted from the 980s until the early 15th century.

Scholars believe that the earliest known Norse settlements in Greenland originated from Iceland, and that Erik the Red founded an early colony in 985. The Kingdom of Norway later claimed and controlled Greenland singularly from roughly 1261–1319.

These Norse settlements vanished during the 14th and early 15th centuries, leaving the Inuit as the sole occupants of the island, expanding to the southern and western coasts, and being de facto independent for over 200 years until European peoples returned. Despite this, a de jure continuing European possession of Greenland was assumed by European peoples.

=== European resettlement in the 18th–20th centuries ===
European contact with Greenland was not re-established until 1721 with the mission of Hans Egede, which was followed by the Moravian missions. These established enduring settlements and—after failing to find the Norse peoples—attempted to Christianize the Inuit.

By this time Norway and Denmark had been unified under Denmark–Norway which considered Greenland part of its territory. This ended on 14 January 1814 after Norway was ceded from Denmark as a result of the Napoleonic Wars in Europe. As a result of the Treaty of Kiel, Denmark resumed full sovereignty over Greenland soon after. From 1814 to 1953, Greenland was a territory, not independent and not part of Denmark, but directly controlled by the Danish government.

=== American protectorate and temporary occupation ===
During the Second World War, Denmark was occupied and controlled by Nazi Germany between 1940 and 1945. As a result, the US government signed an agreement with Henrik Kauffmann, the Danish ambassador to the US, to hand over defense and control of Greenland to the United States on 9 April 1941. The Danish government was shocked by Kauffmann's move, considered the agreement to be void and recalled Kauffmann from the US. The first American troops arrived in Greenland on 7 July 1941. The US built two airports with full-length runways. Until November 2024, with the renovation of the Nuuk airport, they were the main international airports of Greenland, despite being located far from any traditional settlement.

Greenland was effectively independent during the war years, and allowed the United States to build bases on its territory, in spite of the Danish pre-war neutrality. After the war the pre-war situation was restored, the US bases remained and Denmark, with Greenland as a part of the Kingdom, joined NATO.

== Moves towards independence ==
Largely spurred by the report from the Greenland Commission in 1950, the 1953 Danish Constitution formally incorporated Greenland into Denmark as the County of Greenland, granting the new province representation in the Danish Parliament.

In 1972, at the request of the Provincial Council, Knud Hertling established a committee of Greenlandic members to study the possibility of increased local power. In 1975, the committee recommended a shift to home rule as quickly as possible. Hertling responded with the creation of a Commission on Home Rule in Greenland with 14 members divided evenly between Greenlandic and Danish representatives. The commission's work submitted its final report in June 1978 with proposals for a Home Rule Act.

In 1979, the Danish government granted Greenland home rule, with Denmark keeping control of a number of areas including foreign relations, defense, currency matters, and the legal system in Greenland.

Greenland's minimal representation in the Danish Folketing meant that, although over 70% of Greenlanders had opposed entry into the European Common Market (EEC), it nevertheless joined in 1973 as part of Denmark. Greenlanders' fears that the customs union would allow foreign firms to compete and overfish its waters were quickly realized. After home rule was secured, a bare majority (53%) of Greenland's population voted on 23 February 1982 to leave the EEC, a process which lasted until 1985. This resulted in the Greenland Treaty of 1985.

In 2008, Greenland's citizens approved the Greenlandic self-government referendum with a 75% vote in favor of a higher degree of autonomy. Greenland took control of law enforcement, the coast guard, and the legal system. The official language changed from Danish to Greenlandic on 21 June 2009, with the day being celebrated as Greenland national day. The act gives control of foreign relations of Greenland to the island in trade and other areas it is responsible for. Greenland has representatives in Copenhagen, Brussels, Reykjavik, and Washington, D.C.

As part of the self-rule law of 2009 (section §21), Greenland can declare full independence if it wishes to pursue it, but it would have to be approved by a referendum among the Greenlandic people and by the Danish parliament. It has been argued that because it was once a colony, under international law Greenland also has, separate from the 2009 law, the right of self-determination and could make a unilateral declaration of independence. A poll in 2016 showed that there was a clear majority (64%) for full independence among the Greenlandic people, but a poll in 2017 showed that there was a clear opposition (78%) if it meant a fall in living standards.

Greenland's former prime minister, Kuupik Kleist, has repeatedly expressed the need to diversify Greenland's economy, which mainly relies on fishery, tourism and a substantial annual block grant from the Danish state. The block grant equals about two-thirds of Greenland's government budget or about one-quarter of the entire GDP of Greenland. Economic stability is seen as a basis for full political independence from Denmark. When Kim Kielsen was reelected with a strong majority as the leader of the largest Greenlandic pro-independence party Siumut in 2017, observers considered it a win for the "slow-independence" faction instead of the "now-independence" faction. (His opponent, Vittus Qujaukitsoq, had argued for independence even if it meant losing the large annual block grant from the Danish state.) During a debate in the Danish Parliament (which also includes members from Greenland) in 2018, Danish Prime Minister Lars Løkke Rasmussen said that Greenland needs to make it clear if they wish to remain a part of the Kingdom or become independent. If Greenland were to become an independent country, the annual block grant from Denmark to Greenland would cease.

In 2008, independence campaigners touted the year 2021 (the 300th anniversary of Danish colonial rule) as a possible date for independence.

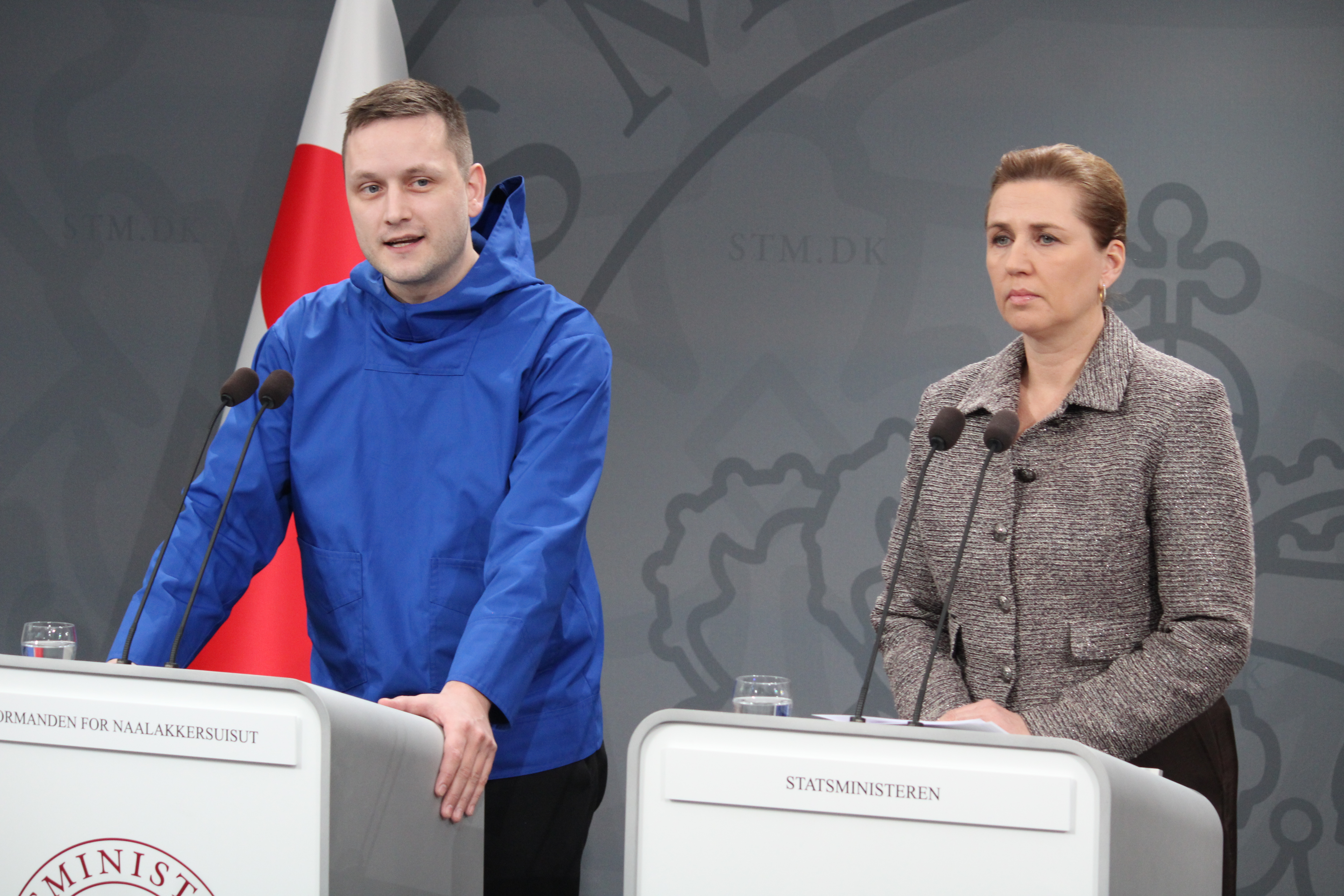
Greenlandic leader Jens Frederik-Nielsen announcing "We choose Denmark" at a January 2026 press conference with Mette Frederiksen in response to Trump's threats to invade or annex the country

In 2023, a commission tasked with drafting a constitution for an independent Greenland presented its proposal. In February 2024, the island officially declared that independence is the goal for Greenland.

US President Donald Trump's interest in Greenland has strengthened the cause of Greenland's independence from Denmark.

However, Trump's rhetoric and threats of annexation seem to have impacted the outcome of Greenland's 2025 general elections in favour of Denmark-friendly Democratic Party, which became the island's largest party. Furthermore, Greenlandic independence activists like Aqqaluk Lynge have publicly shared that Greenland should remain a part of Denmark to protect it from American interference. Yet, in those same elections, 25% of the vote went to Greenland's "most radical pro-independence party", Naleraq, whose chair Pele Broberg has expressed frustration at the delay of actions towards independence.

Greenland has never held an independence referendum, unlike neighbouring territories such as Iceland (in 1918), the Faroe Islands (in 1946) and Newfoundland (in 1948).

== Polling ==
A poll in 2016 showed that there was a clear majority (64%) for full independence among the Greenlandic people.

A 2017 poll showed that 78% of the population would oppose independence if it implied a lower standard of living.

A 2019 poll showed that 67.8% of Greenlanders support independence from Denmark sometime in the next two decades.

A 2025 poll showed that a majority 84% of Greenlanders would support independence from Denmark, with 9% opposing. 61% opposed independence if it meant a lower standard of living, with 39% in favour. When asked in a binary choice between the USA and Denmark, 85% preferred to be part of Denmark with only 6% preferring the USA.

== In fiction ==
The issue of Greenlandic independence features heavily in the eighth episode of the Swedish–Icelandic television series Thin Ice (2019–2020). Written by Søren Stærmose and Lena Endre, it was predominantly filmed in Greenland at the height of the Greenlandic winter. By the end of the first season, Greenland achieves independence, with covert backing from the United States. The political system of the newly independent Greenland is not given, although the country is shown to have awarded an unnamed American oil company offshore drilling rights to a large deep sea oil deposit.

== See also ==
- 1979 Greenlandic home rule referendum
- Faroese independence movement
- First Nations in Canada
- Former colonies and territories in Canada
- Icelandic independence movement
- Norwegian independence movement
- Nunavut
- Proposals for the United States to purchase Greenland
- Separatism in Canada
- Territorial evolution of Canada
- Withdrawal from the European Union
