= Suka K. Frederiksen =

Greenlandic politician (1965–2020)

Foreign Minister of Greenland
- In office 25 April 2017 – 2018
- Preceded by: Vittus Qujaukitsoq
- Succeeded by: Vivian Motzfeldt

Minister of Independence and Agriculture
- In office November 2016 – 2018

Member of the Inatsisartut
- Incumbent
- Assumed office 2014 - 2018

Personal details
- Born: 18 July 1965 Narsaq, Greenland
- Died: 21 July 2020 (aged 55)
- Party: Siumut
- Children: Katti Frederiksen

Suka K. Frederiksen (18 July 1965 – 21 July 2020) was a Greenlandic politician. Frederiksen was a member of the Inatsisartut (2014 to 2018) and had held the position of Minister of Independence and Agriculture (2016 to 2018) and Foreign Affairs (2017 to 2018).

== Early life and education ==
Frederiksen was born on 18 July 1965 in Narsaq, Greenland. From 2007 to 2010, she completed a management diploma and a bachelor of commerce.

== Career ==
In 1986, Frederiksen started her career as an office clerk and worked for HK Commercial. She spent the next five years at a sheep farm before working briefly at a grocery store in Greenland. In 1994, Frederiksen started a ten-year position as a principal for Narsaq before moving on and held managerial positions in Kujalleq Municipality.

Frederiksen started her career in politics as a city councilor for Narsaq Municipality in 2005. After her position ended in 2009, her next political position came in 2014 when she was elected to the Inatsisartut. During her time at the Inatsisartut, she became the first Minister of Independence for Greenland in 2016. As Minister of Independence, Frederiksen led a committee that began drafting a constitution for Greenland on the basis of a potential independence.

In 2017, Frederiksen was named Foreign Minister of Greenland after Vittus Qujaukitsoq resigned and became in charge of international relations between Greenland and Denmark. During her term as Foreign Minister, Frederiksen declared that a prior complaint by Qujaukitsoq to the United Nations was retracted and that the complaint was made by him alone.

== Death ==
Frederiksen died on 21 July 2020, at the age of 55, following a long illness.
