= Knud Hertling =

Greenlandic-Danish politician

Knud Ludvig Johannes Hertling (7 January 1925 in Paamiut (Frederikshåb) – 26 October 2010) was a Greenlandic-Danish politician from the Social Democrats. He served as Minister for Greenland from 1971 to 1973 under prime ministers Jens Otto Krag and Anker Jørgensen.

Hertling was a Greenlandic member of the Folketing from 1964 to 1973. He founded the party Sukaq in 1969, the first political party to be established in Greenland. His aim was to work for greater home rule for Greenland.

Hertling was the first Greenlander to hold a ministerial post in the Danish government.

== Personal life ==
Hertling was born in Paamiut, but was raised in Aasiaat. He and his brother Jørgen moved to Denmark in 1945 and were adopted by Danish pastor Svend Hertling in 1947.

Hertling died in Fejø in October 2010 at the age of 85.
