= Deputy Prime Minister of Greenland =

Position of acting PM when PM is absent in Greenland

Deputy Prime Minister
- Naalakkersuisut siulittaasuata tullia Vice-landsstyreformand
- Incumbent; Vacant
- Appointer: Prime Minister of Greenland
- Term length: No fixed term, Serves at the pleasure of the Prime Minister
- Website: www.naalakkersuisut.gl

Deputy Prime Minister of Greenland is a position, held by one government minister, in the Government of Greenland who can take the position of acting Prime Minister when the Prime minister is temporarily absent. The job is unofficial, but in many media, the person taking over when the Prime Minister is absent, is often dubbed Deputy Prime Minister, or Naalakkersuisut siulittaasuata tullia in Greenlandic.

In case of coalition governments, the position is usually held by the leader of the second largest party in the cabinet. The Deputy Prime Minister is also the highest ranking minister after the Prime Minister.

The only person to hold the position was Andreas Uldum.

== List of deputy prime ministers ==
Deputy Prime Minister	Term of office	Party	Position	Duration
Andreas Uldum	December 10, 2014 – Unknown	Demokraatit	Minister for Finance and Mineral Resources	11 years, 271 days
