= Martha Abelsen =

Greenlandic politician

Personal details
- Born: 1957 (age 67–68) Nuuk

Martha Abelsen (born 1957) is a Greenlandic politician.

She was born in Nuuk and trained as a kindergarten teacher. She also received management training. Abelsen worked for the KANUKOKA, the association of Greenland municipalities, for 15 years. She began work there as a consultant and, in 1999, became director. Abelsen was elected chairman in 2010. She resigned effective September 1, 2013. In October 2011, she was named second deputy mayor for Sermersooq municipality. In 2014, she was named a representative for Greenland on the Executive Council of the Inuit Circumpolar Council.
