= Qulleq (political party) =

- Abbreviation: Q
- Leader: Karl Ingemann
- Founder: Henrik Fleischer
- Founded: March 2023
- Split from: Siumut; Naleraq
- Ideology: Greenlandic independence Greenlandic nationalism Pro-Americanism
- Colours: Light yellow Light blue
- Inatsisartut: 0 / 31
- Municipalities: 0 / 81
- Folketing (Greenland seats): 0 / 2

Qulleq (which is named after a traditional style of oil lamp) is a Greenlandic political party, that was formed in 2023 from former members of the Siumut and Naleraq parties.

On 13 February 2025, the party qualified to run in its first election in the March 2025 Greenlandic general election, after collecting the 856 voter endorsements required for a political party to stand in that election. At that time, the candidates for the election had not yet been finalized and neither had the candidates for the municipal election on 1 April 2025.

== Positions ==
The party's platform is focused on rapid independence from Denmark and beginning the extraction of oil from Greenland. Party leader Karl Ingemann was the only Greenlandic party leader to voice his trust in President of the United States Donald Trump ahead of the 2025 elections.

== Leadership ==
When the party formed in March 2023, the chairman was Henrik Fleischer, who was previously a member of Siumut. During their first parliamentary election, the chairman was Karl Ingemann.

== Election results ==
=== Parliament of Greenland (Inatsisartut) ===
Election	Votes	%	Seats	±
2025	305	1.1 (#6)	0 / 31	New
