= Jens-Frederik Nielsen =

Prime Minister of Greenland since 2025

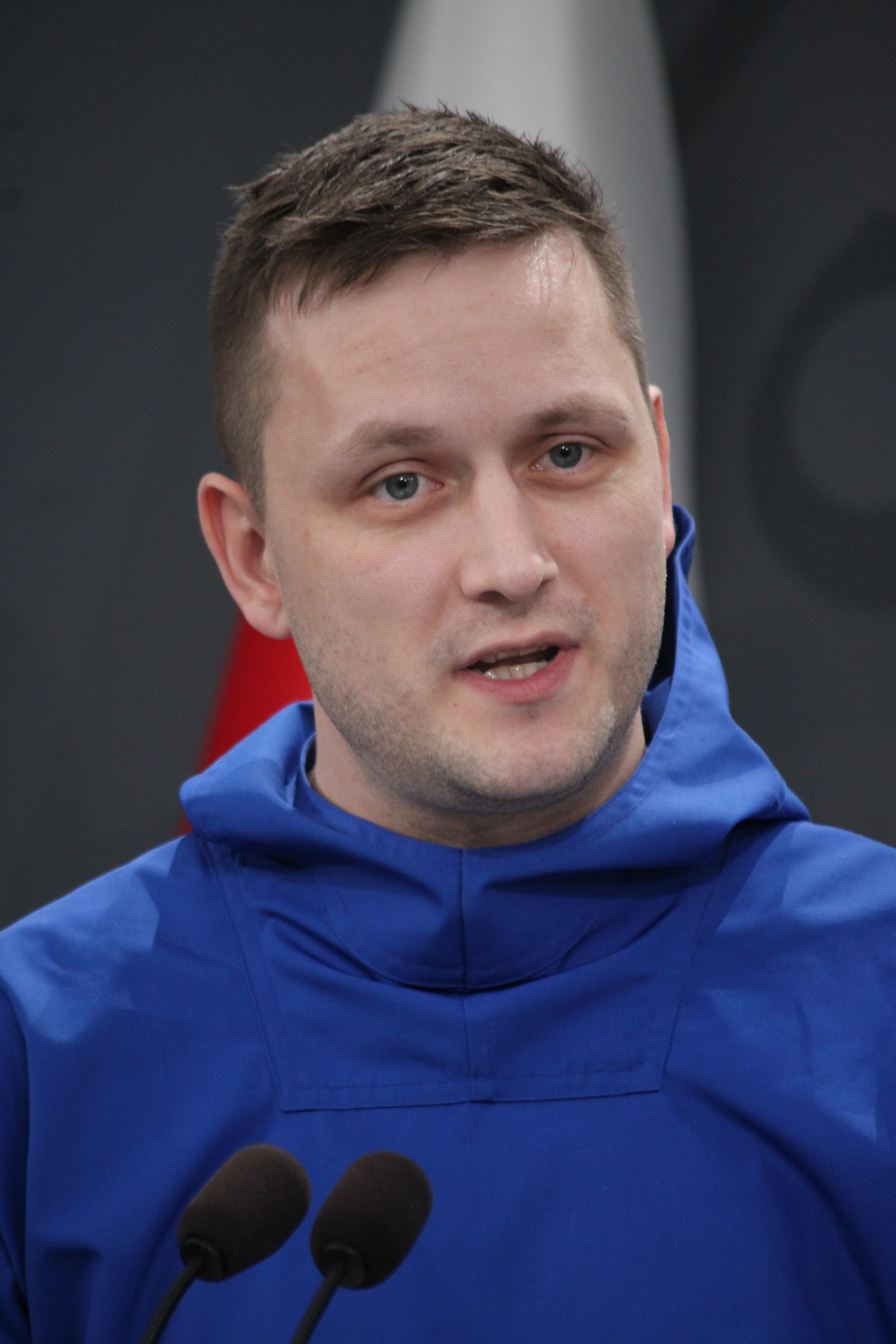
- Nielsen in 2026

Prime Minister of Greenland
- Incumbent
- Assumed office 7 April 2025
- Monarch: Frederik X
- Preceded by: Múte Bourup Egede

Chair of the Demokraatit Party
- Incumbent
- Assumed office 2020
- Preceded by: Niels Thomsen

Minister of Industry and Mineral Resources
- In office 29 May 2020 – 8 February 2021
- Prime Minister: Kim Kielsen
- Preceded by: Jess Svane
- Succeeded by: Naaja Nathanielsen

Personal details
- Born: 22 June 1991 (age 35) Greenland
- Party: Demokraatit
- Education: University of Greenland

Medal record

Badminton

Representing Greenland

Island Games
Silver medal – second place	2009 Åland	Team
Gold medal – first place	2015 Jersey	Men's doubles
Silver medal – second place	2017 Gotland	Men's doubles
Bronze medal – third place	2019 Gibraltar	Men's singles
Gold medal – first place	2019 Gibraltar	Team
Gold medal – first place	2023 Guernsey	Men's singles
Silver medal – second place	2023 Guernsey	Team

Jens-Frederik Nielsen (born 22 June 1991) is a Greenlandic politician who has served as the prime minister of Greenland since 2025. He is the leader of the Demokraatit party (the Democrats), and he formerly served as the Minister of Labour and Mineral Resources during the Kielsen VII Cabinet of May 2020 to February 2021. Nielsen is the first member of the Democrats to hold the office of prime minister. Before entering politics, he was a champion badminton player.

== Early life and education ==
Jens-Frederik Nielsen was born on 22 June 1991 and raised in Greenland. His Danish father moved to Greenland as a child, while his Greenlandic Inuit mother was born and raised there. Nielsen grew up in Nuuk.

Nielsen has described experiencing bullying during his childhood because of his mixed background and appearance, stating that he was targeted by other pupils for "looking Danish", despite attending the Greenlandic language class and having a Greenlandic mother. He has also noted that socioeconomic differences – his primary school was located in a socially disadvantaged area of Nuuk, while he lived in a different district – contributed to his treatment at school. Nielsen has stated that these experiences influenced his political views and his advocacy for a diverse and inclusive Greenland, with equal space for all who wish to contribute to society.

Nielsen earned a degree in social science from the University of Greenland. Prior to entering politics, he worked in real estate.

== Badminton ==
Nielsen became a member of the Greenland national badminton team in 2009, and won the singles and doubles championships in most years for several years. He also won a number of medals at the Island Games, including the gold medal in men's singles badminton in the 2023 Island Games.

== Political career ==
In 2020, Nielsen was elected to succeed Niels Thomsen as chair of the Demokraatit party (the Democrats). He was reelected to the role in March 2024.

In May 2020, Nielsen was named the Minister of Industry and Mineral Resources as part of the Kielsen VII Cabinet, but lost the role after he withdrew his party from the government shortly afterwards.

=== Political views ===
After Russian forces had begun their war of aggression against Ukraine on 24 February 2022, Nielsen urged Polar Seafood A/S to halt its Russian operations, emphasising the need to pressure Russia and restore peace in Europe.

Nielsen has advocated for reducing reliance on Denmark's block grant by prioritising business development and economic self-sufficiency in Greenland.

=== Prime Minister of Greenland (2025–present) ===
In the general election in March 2025, the Democrats more than tripled their seats, and Nielsen received 4,850 personal votes. Incumbent Prime Minister Múte Bourup Egede received 3,276 votes.

On 27 August 2025, Nielsen, along with Danish Prime Minister Mette Frederiksen, issued an official apology on behalf of the Danish and Greenlandic governments for historic abuses against Greenlandic women, including forced contraception.

==== United States threats ====
U.S. President Donald Trump signing a trilateral agreement with Danish Prime Minister Mette Frederiksen and Nielsen at the UN Headquarters in New York City, 22 September 2026

On 20 January 2025, Donald Trump began his second term as U.S. president. In March 2025, Nielsen condemned Trump's threats to invade Greenland, stating that "We don't want to be Americans. No, we don't want to be Danes. We want to be Greenlanders. And we want our own independence in the future..." Nielsen said Trump will not "get" Greenland. Shortly before Vice President of the United States JD Vance and his wife Usha arrived to visit the Pituffik Space Base in Greenland on 29 March 2025, a four-party coalition government was announced by Nielsen. He also showed his solidarity with Denmark in the face of the US threat, when went on an official visit with Frederiksen to meet with German Chancellor Friedrich Merz and French president Emmanuel Macron.

In April 2025, a plan by the US for undermining the territorial integrity of the Kingdom of Denmark through a campaign of foreign interference and disinformation on social media became known. The official Danish threat assessment published by the Danish Defence Intelligence Service in 2025 for the first time mentioned the US as a threat to national security, alongside Russia and China. Frederiksen reminded Trump that an attack on the Kingdom of Denmark is an attack on NATO, and that all NATO members are obligated to come to Denmark's defence. Greenland, as part of Denmark, is a member of NATO and therefore covered by the collective security guarantee.

On 13 January 2026, ten days after US troops had attacked Venezuela and captured Maduro and his wife, Nielsen and Danish prime minister Mette Frederiksen said in a joint press conference that the US pressure campaign against Greenland was unacceptable, and that Greenland is not for sale. Nielsen emphasised that talk about buying another people shows a lack of respect. Nielsen said:

One thing must be clear to everyone: Greenland does not want to be owned by the US, Greenland does not want to be governed by the US, Greenland does not want to be part of the US. We choose the Greenland we know today, which is a part of the Kingdom of Denmark.

In response to Nielsen stating that Greenland had no wish to become part of the US, Trump said in January 2026 that he did not know who the Greenlandic prime minister was, stating: "I disagree with them. I don't know who he is, don't know anything about him, but that's going to be a big problem".
