= Mark Constable =

English badminton player

Personal information
- Nationality: England; Jersey
- Born: 15 September 1976 (age 49) Coventry, West Midlands
Medal record
Badminton
Representing England
Commonwealth Games
Bronze medal – third place	1998 Kuala Lumpur	men's team event
European Junior Championships
Silver medal – second place	1995 Nitra	Boys' singles
Bronze medal – third place	1995 Nitra	Mixed team

Mark J Constable (born 1976) is a retired male badminton player who has represented England and Jersey. He won the English National Badminton Championships men's singles title in 2002 and represented Team England 27 times in various team events spreading over Sudirman Cup, Thomas Cup, Commonwealth Games and other international matches.

== Biography ==
Constable represented England and won a bronze medal in the men's team event, at the 1998 Commonwealth Games in Kuala Lumpur, Malaysia.

Four years later he competed in the 2002 Commonwealth Games in Manchester where he helped Team England to win the Gold Medal. Mark retired shortly after the Manchester Games due to a severe knee injury and moved to the Channel Islands in 2003. He became the Jersey Island coach on a part-time basis and coached during the Melbourne 2006 CWG but returned in 2014 as a competitor to represent Team Jersey at the 2014 Commonwealth Games.

He represented Jersey at the Island Games 2015 where he won the men's singles and team gold medal titles. He followed on two years later to defend his title at the NatWest Island Games to again win individual gold in the men's singles event and also helped in securing the team silver medal.

Mark was Jersey's Badminton Development Officer from 2014 until 2018.
