= Erik Jensen (Greenlandic politician) =

Greenlandic politician

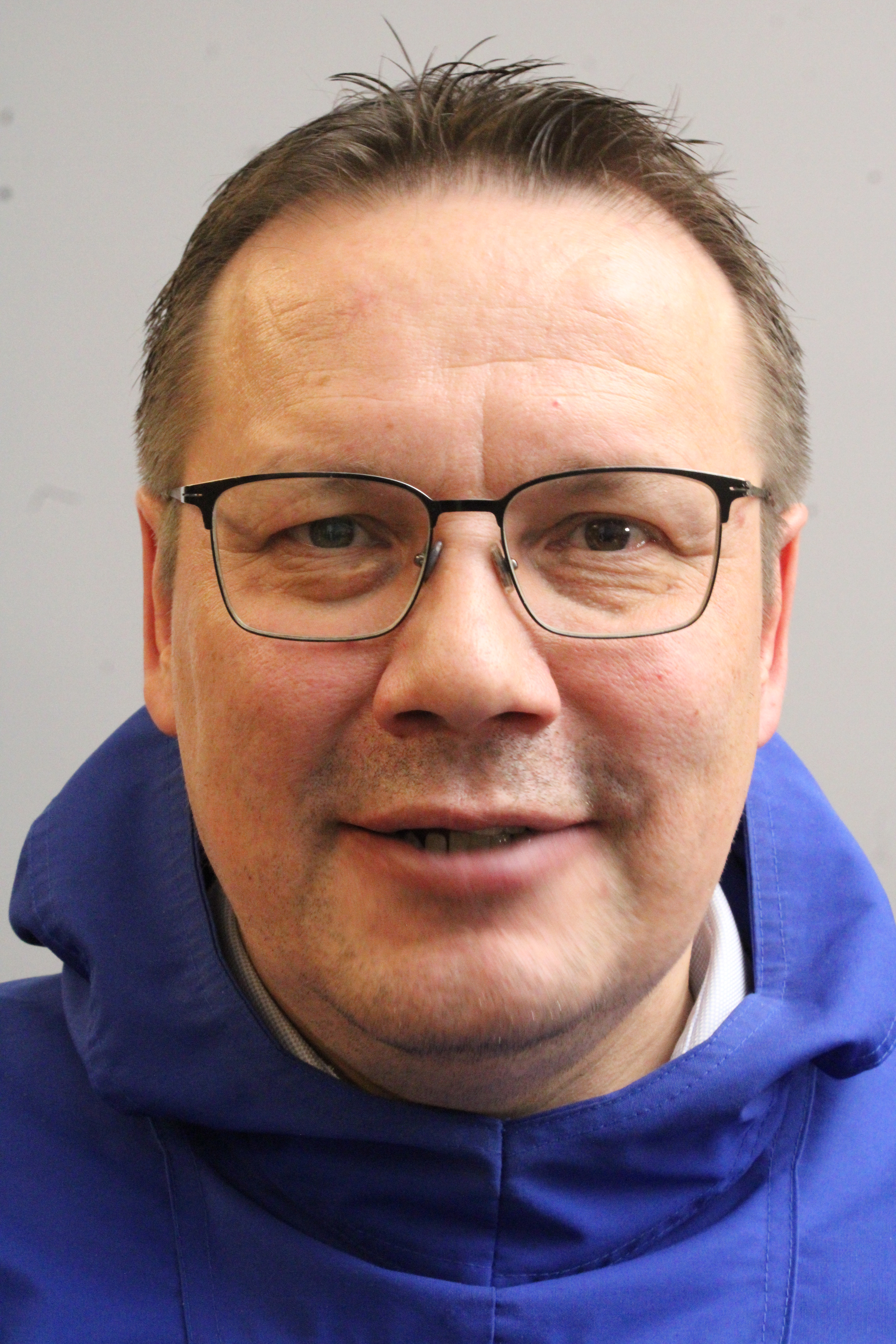
- Jensen in 2026

Leader of Siumut
- In office 29 November 2020 – 12 March 2025
- Prime Minister: Kim Kielsen
- Preceded by: Kim Kielsen
- Succeeded by: Vivian Motzfeldt

Minister of Housing and Infrastructure
- Incumbent
- Assumed office 4 April 2022
- Prime Minister: Múte Bourup Egede
- Preceded by: Naaja Nathanielsen

Minister of Mineral Resources
- In office 11 May 2018 – Ended
- Monarch: Margrethe II
- Prime Minister: Kim Kielsen
- Succeeded by: Jens Frederik-Nielsen

Minister of Labor
- In office 11 May 2018 – Ended
- Monarch: Margrethe II
- Prime Minister: Kim Kielsen
- Succeeded by: Jess Svane

Personal details
- Born: 15 July 1975 (age 50) Sisimiut, Qeqqata, Greenland
- Citizenship: Denmark
- Party: Siumut
- Occupation: Politician

Erik Jensen (born 15 July 1975) is a Greenlandic politician who is serving as the Minister of Mineral Resources and Labor. He previously served as the leader of Siumut from 2020 to 2025. He is a strong proponent of the Greenland independence movement.

== Political career ==
In the Kielsen V Cabinet, Erik Jensen served as the Minister of Mineral Resources and Labor. In October 2019, Jensen met with delegates from the United States to discuss initiatives of Greenland's resource sector.

In 2020, disputes within Siumut regarding the leadership of Kim Kielsen and his lack of involvement of local politicians in decision making processes came to a boiling point, and Jensen resigned from the government. In 2020, Jensen was elected the new party leader of Siumut, beating incumbent leader Kim Kielsen in a 39-32 margin. Jensen has had been trying to distinguish himself from Kielsen as more for Greenlandic independence. Traditionally, the leader of the ruling party also took the position as the Prime Minister of Greenland, however Prime Minister Kielsen has not confirmed how he would proceed with the results. Jensen so far has shown no intention to immediately compete for the position of Prime Minister.

== Political positions ==
When United States President Donald Trump proposed to buy Greenland from Denmark, Jensen responded that "Greenland is open for business, but we are not for sale."
