= 2014 Greenlandic general election =

- 28 November 2014
- All 31 seats in the Inatsisartut; 16 seats needed for a majority
- Turnout: 72.95% (▼1.25pp)
Party	Leader	Vote %	Seats	+/–
Siumut	Kim Kielsen	34.61	11	−3
Inuit Ataqatigiit	Sara Olsvig	33.49	11	0
Democrats	Anda Uldum	11.88	4	+2
Naleraq	Hans Enoksen	11.73	3	New
Atassut	Knud Kristiansen	6.57	2	0
This lists parties that won seats. See the complete results below.
Results by municipality
Prime Minister before	Prime Minister after
Aleqa Hammond; Siumut	Kim Kielsen; Siumut

Early general elections were held in Greenland on 28 November 2014. They were called after Prime Minister Aleqa Hammond resigned following a spending scandal. Siumut and Inuit Ataqatigiit emerged as the largest parties both winning 11 of the 31 seats. A three party coalition government was formed consisting of the incumbent Siumut and Atassut parties alongside the Democrats.

== Electoral system ==
The 31 members of Parliament were elected by proportional representation in multi-member constituencies. Seats were allocated using the d'Hondt method.

== Results ==
Party	Votes	%	Seats	+/–
Siumut	10,102	34.61	11	–3
Inuit Ataqatigiit	9,776	33.49	11	0
Democrats	3,468	11.88	4	+2
Partii Naleraq	3,423	11.73	3	New
Atassut	1,919	6.57	2	0
Partii Inuit	477	1.63	0	–2
Independents	22	0.08	0	0
Total	29,187	100.00	31	0
Valid votes	29,187	98.98		
Invalid/blank votes	301	1.02		
Total votes	29,488	100.00		
Registered voters/turnout	40,424	72.95		
Source: Qinersineq
