= Nunatta Qitornai =

Separatist political party in Greenland

Descendants of Our Land Nunatta Qitornai
- Chairman: Vittus Qujaukitsoq
- Founded: September 2017
- Dissolved: April 2021 (de facto)
- Split from: Siumut
- Merged into: Naleraq
- Ideology: Greenlandic independence Decentralization; Social democracy Populism
- Political position: Centre-left
- Colors: Purple
- Inatsisartut: 0 / 31
- Folketing (Greenland seats): 0 / 2

Nunatta Qitornai (Danish: Vort lands efterkommere, English: Descendants of Our Land) was a separatist political party in Greenland advocating independence. It was founded in September 2017 by former Minister of Business, Labour, Trade and Foreign Affairs Vittus Qujaukitsoq, who had previously been in Siumut and who was subsequently elected in the 2018 parliamentary election. In the 2021 election, the party lost its seat and ceased its activities. In the 2025 election, the party's erstwhile leader Qujaukitsoq was a candidate for the pro-independence party Naleraq.

== Name ==
Nunavta Qitornai (pre-1973 spelling) was the name of a patriotic and educational youth organisation founded in 1941 by the politician and poet Augo Lynge, who was a prominent advocate for close cooperation between Greenland and Denmark and the incorporation of Greenland into the Danish state; his grandchild has criticized the use of the name for a separatist party as disrespectful to the memory of Augo Lynge.

== History ==
In April 2017, Vittus Qujaukitsoq was relieved from the Foreign Affairs portfolio in the Greenlandic government by Premier Kim Kielsen. This was due to harsh criticism of the Danish handling and filed formal complaint to United Nations with demands of the environmental clean-up of former U.S. military installations across Greenland. He stepped down as Minister of Industry, Trade, Labour and Energy in May 2017. He subsequently challenged Kielsen for the chairmanship at Siumut's party conference in July 2017, and left the party after he lost the vote 19–48.

Vittus Qujaukitsoq advocates a speedy transition to Greenlandic independence, whereas Kim Kielsen and the majority in Siumut are in favour of a gradualist approach.

The party stood in the 2018 parliamentary election, with former Prime Minister Aleqa Hammond as one of its candidates; however, only chairman Vittus Qujaukitsoq was elected.

In the 2021 election, the party lost its only seat.

Prior to the 2025 Greenlandic general election, Nunatta Qitornai leader Vittus Qujaukitsoq joined the Naleraq party, declaring that Nunatta Qitornai is a thing of the past after the 2021 election failure and does not expect the party to be revived.

== Policies ==
Apart from the speedy establishment of a Greenlandic state, the party advocated decentralization of the administration and the establishment of 17 municipalities based on the current population distribution.

== Election results ==
=== Parliament of Greenland ===
Election	Votes	%	Seats	±
2018	1,002	3.4 (#7)	1 / 31	New
2021	639	2.4 (#6)	0 / 31	▼1

=== Parliament of Denmark ===
Election	Votes	%	Seats	±
2019	1622	8.11 (#4)	0 / 2	New
