= Ane Lone Bagger =

Greenlandic politician

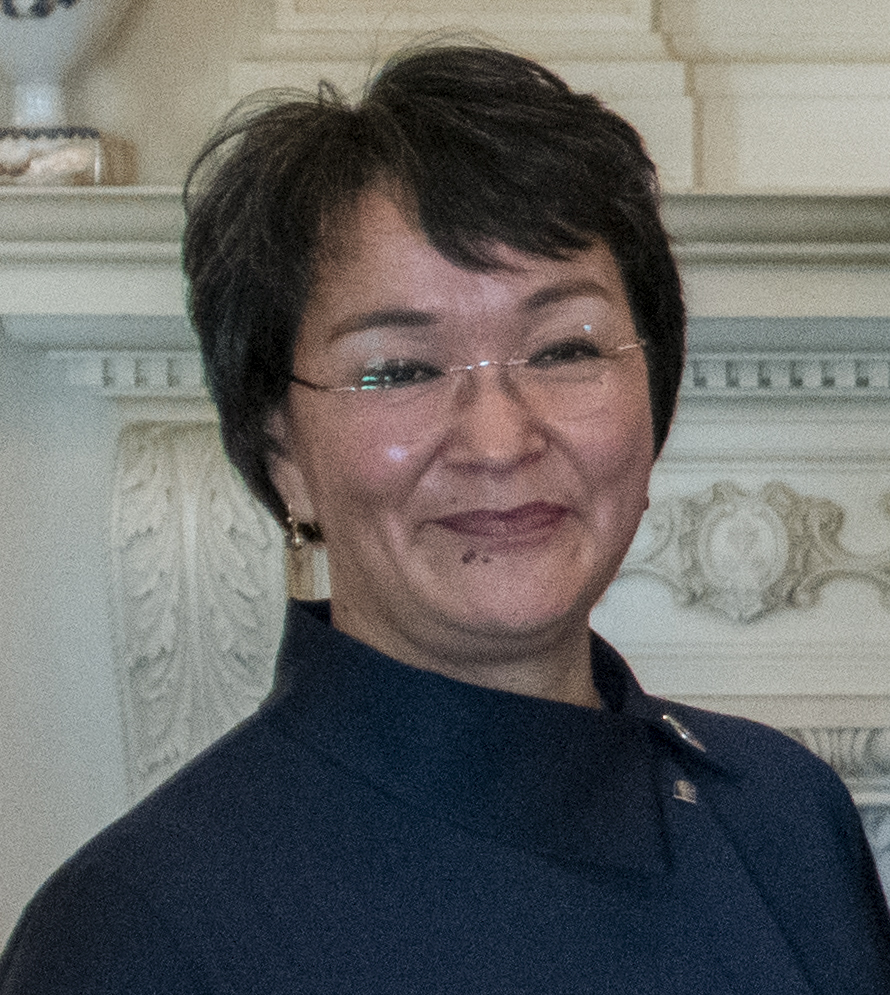
Bagger in 2019

Ane Lone Bagger was the Minister of Education, Culture, Church and Foreign Affairs of Greenland. An aircraft mechanic by training, Bagger was employed as a flight attendant, air traffic controller, and insurance agent prior to taking up her post. She is a former member of the Qaasuitsup Kommunia municipal council. On January 13, 2022, Reuters News reported that she was the victim of an alleged hoax perpetuated by Russian influence agents, in which a letter purporting to be from her was sent to U.S. Senator Tom Cotton in 2019. The letter claims that Greenland would be conducting a referendum on gaining independence from Denmark, and indicated that closer ties with the United States could be achieved. Senator Cotton was a close ally of U.S. President Donald Trump, and after the letter was received President Trump suggested that the United States was interested in purchasing Greenland. This suggestion was largely scoffed at by foreign policy experts, and never came to fruition.
