= 2018 Greenlandic general election =

- 24 April 2018
- All 31 seats in the Inatsisartut; 16 seats needed for a majority
- Turnout: 71.86% (▼1.09pp)
Party	Leader	Vote %	Seats	+/–
Siumut	Kim Kielsen	27.44	9	−2
Inuit Ataqatigiit	Sara Olsvig	25.78	8	−3
Democrats	Randi V. Evaldsen	19.69	6	+2
Naleraq	Hans Enoksen	13.55	4	+1
Atassut	Siverth K. Heilmann	5.96	2	0
Cooperation Party	Michael Rosing	4.11	1	New
Nunatta Qitornai	Vittus Qujaukitsoq	3.45	1	New
This lists parties that won seats. See the complete results below.
Results by municipality
Prime Minister before	Prime Minister after
Kim Kielsen; Siumut	Kim Kielsen; Siumut

General elections were held in Greenland on 24 April 2018, electing all 31 members of Parliament. The elections were required to be held no later than 26 November 2018, four years after the previous elections on 27 November 2014, but Prime Minister Kim Kielsen chose to call the elections seven months early. His Siumut party remained the largest in Parliament, but lost two seats, whilst Inuit Ataqatigiit, the second-largest party, lost three seats. The smaller Democrats and Partii Naleraq gained seats, with the newly formed Cooperation Party and Nunatta Qitornai parties both entering Parliament.

== Background ==
The 2014 general elections saw Siumut receive a narrow plurality of the vote, but win the same number of seats as Inuit Ataqatigiit (11). A coalition government was formed by Siumut, Democrats and Atassut which lasted until 2016, when Siumut formed a new coalition with Inuit Ataqatigiit and Partii Naleraq. Kim Kielsen from Siumut has led both governments.

During the 2014–2018 parliamentary term, both Atassut MPs defected to Siumut, while Michael Rosing left the Democrats to sit as an independent.

== Electoral system ==
The 31 members of Parliament are elected by proportional representation in multi-member constituencies. Seats are allocated using the d'Hondt method.

== New parties ==
Two new parties contested the elections, the unionist and socially liberal Cooperation Party (Suleqatigiissitsisut) founded by Michael Rosing, and the pro-independence Nunatta Qitornai (Descendants of Our Country) founded by former Minister of Finance and Interior, Minister of Industry, Labour, Trade, Tourism, Energy and Foreign Affairs and Minister of Finance, Minerals and Foreign Affairs Vittus Qujaukitsoq after a dispute over the government's approach toward Denmark. He eventually left Siumut following an unsuccessful leadership challenge to Kim Kielsen.

== Opinion polls ==
View source data.

Polling Firm	Date	Siumut	IA	Democrats	Naleraq	Atassut	NQ	SA
HS Analyse	21–24 March 2018	32.6 (11)	33.7 (11)	12.6 (4)	10.6 (3)	4.1 (1)	4.6 (1)	1.8 (0)
HS Analyse	11–15 April 2018	27.4 (9)	31.0 (10)	18.8 (6)	11.1 (3)	5.2 (1)	3.6 (1)	2.9 (1)

== Results ==
Party	Votes	%	Seats	+/–
Siumut	7,959	27.44	9	–2
Inuit Ataqatigiit	7,478	25.78	8	–3
Democrats	5,712	19.69	6	+2
Partii Naleraq	3,931	13.55	4	+1
Atassut	1,730	5.96	2	0
Cooperation Party	1,193	4.11	1	New
Nunatta Qitornai	1,002	3.45	1	New
Total	29,005	100.00	31	0
Valid votes	29,005	99.01		
Invalid/blank votes	291	0.99		
Total votes	29,296	100.00		
Registered voters/turnout	40,769	71.86		
Source: Qinersineq.gl
