= Hans Egede House =

Historic house in Nuuk, Greenland

Coordinates: 64.1782°N 51.7448°W

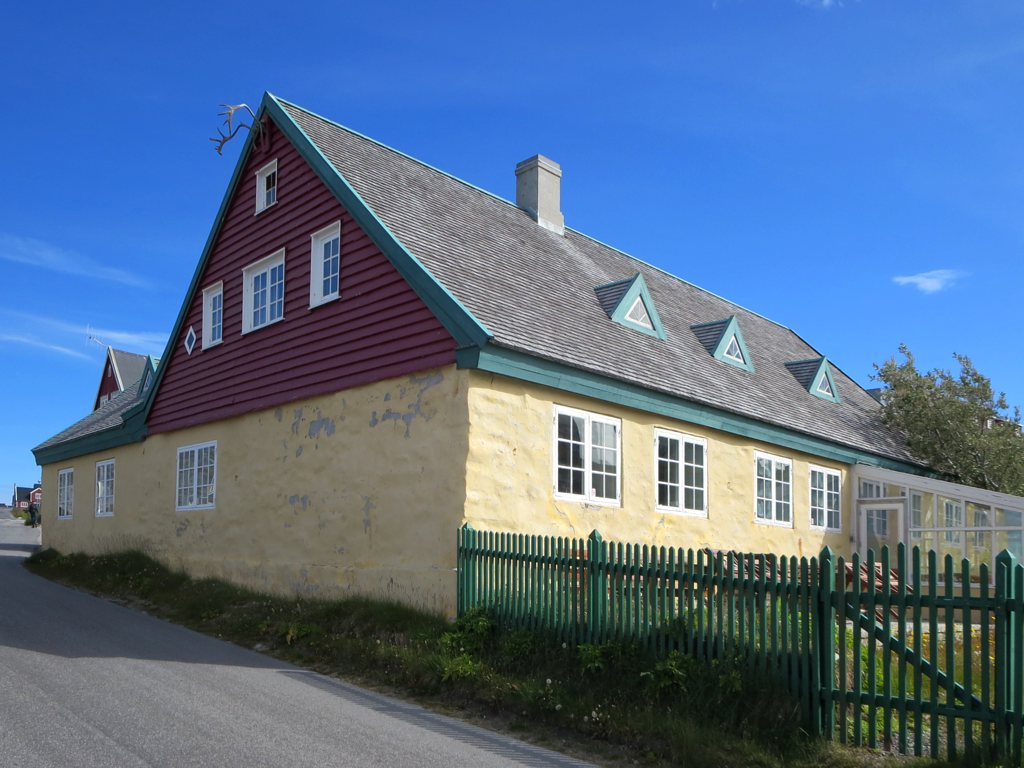
Hans Egede House

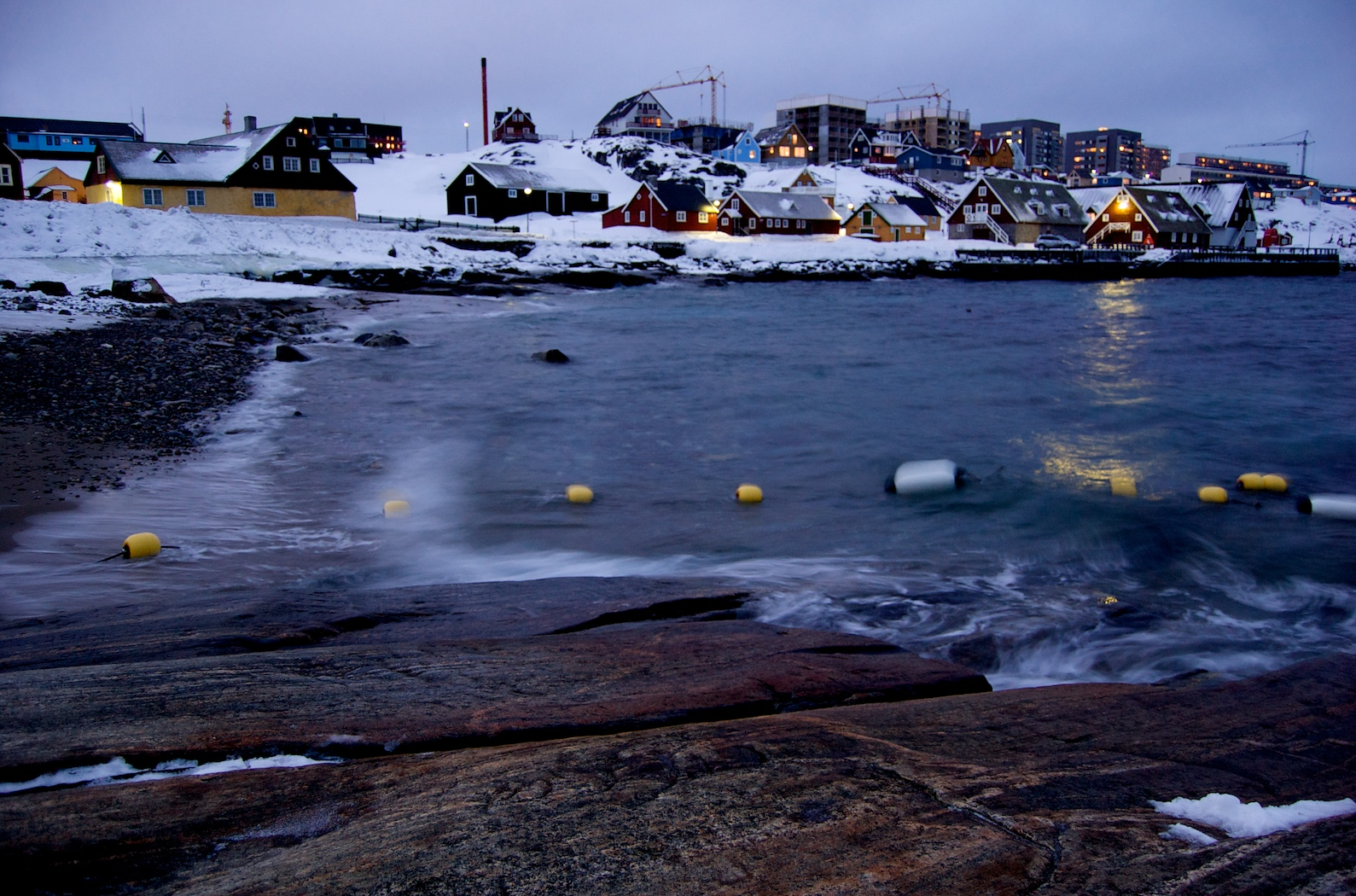
Hans Egede House, visible in the far top left

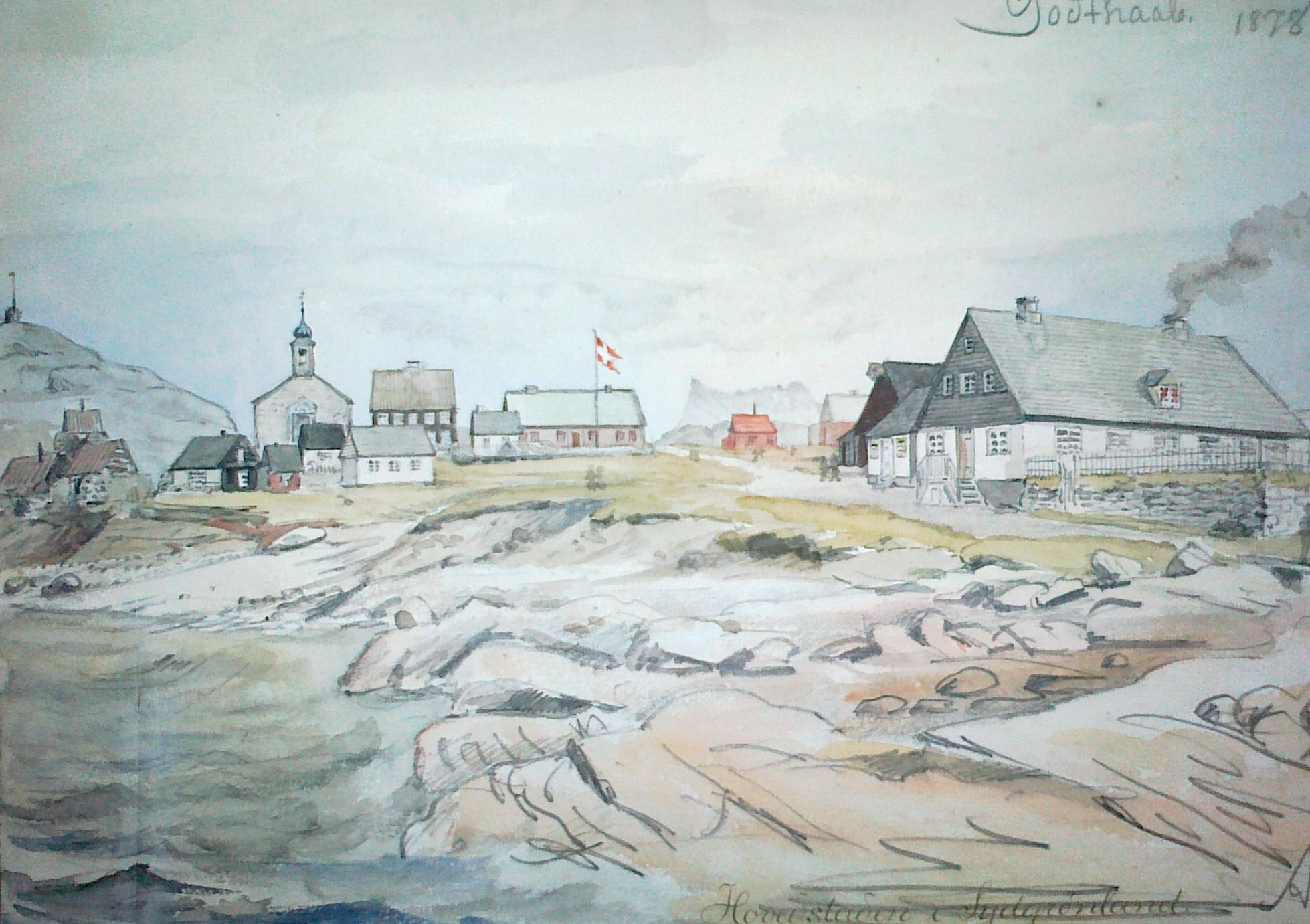
An 1878 painting with Hans Egede House at far right

Hans Egede House is located in Nuuk, Greenland. It is the oldest house in the country and was built in 1728. It was originally the residence of Hans Egede, a Dano-Norwegian Lutheran missionary. Later it was the residence of the Greenlandic prime minister. It is currently used for official government receptions.

== See also ==
- Statue of Hans Egede
