= Cooperation Party =

Greenlandic political party

Cooperation Party Suleqatigiissitsisut
- Danish name: Samarbejdspartiet
- Chairman: Michael Rosing
- Deputy Chairwoman: Tillie Martinussen
- Founded: 11 March 2018
- Split from: Democrats
- Ideology: Danish unionism Liberalism; Economic liberalism
- Political position: Centre-right
- Nordic Council affiliation: Centre Group
- Colors: Purple
- Inatsisartut: 0 / 31
- Folketing (Greenland seats): 0 / 2

Website
- sulesam.gl

The Cooperation Party (Danish: Samarbejdspartiet; Greenlandic: Suleqatigiissitsisut) is a Greenlandic liberal party founded in March 2018 by Inatsisartut MPs Michael Rosing and Tillie Martinussen, both formerly of the Democrats.

The party advocates economic liberalisation and privatisation of the large publicly owned companies that dominate the Greenlandic economy.

The Cooperation Party is in favour of increased cooperation within the unity of the Realm, increased immigration to Greenland and better integration and inclusion of immigrants and minorities. Another main priority for the party is more support for the socially vulnerable, especially sexually abused children and youth.

The party ran in the 2018 Greenlandic parliamentary elections; it won one seat with 1,193 votes. In the 2021 elections, the party lost its only seat.

== Election results ==
=== Parliament of Greenland ===
| Election | Votes | % | Seats | ± |
|---|---|---|---|---|
| 2018 | 1,193 | 4.1 (#6) | 1 / 31 | New |
| 2021 | 376 | 1.4 (#7) | 0 / 31 | ▼1 |

=== Parliament of Denmark ===
| Election | Votes | % | Seats | ± |
|---|---|---|---|---|
| 2019 | 518 | 2.6 (#7) | 0 / 2 | New |
| 2022 | 176 | 0.9 (#6) | 0 / 2 | 0 |
