= Doris J. Jensen =

Greenlandic politician (born 1978)

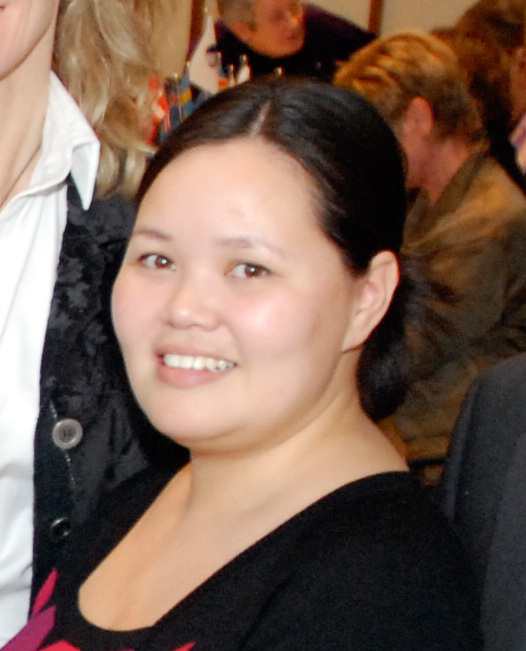
- Jensen in 2006

Personal details
- Born: October 30, 1978 (age 46); Ilulissat, Greenland
- Political party: Siumut
- Children: 4

Doris J. Jensen, also Doris Jakobsen, (born 1978) is a Greenlandic politician in the Siumut or Forward party. A former member of the Danish Folketing (2011–2015), she became an elected member of the Parliament of Greenland in 2002. In April 2018, she was appointed Minister of Health and Research in the Naalakkersuisut (Government of Greenland).

== Biography ==
Doris Jakobsen was born on 30 October 1978 in Ilulissat. Her parents are Ole Lars and Sofie Jakobsen. Now married to Ejvind Jensen, she has two children of her own and two stepchildren. After matriculating from high school in 1998, Jakobsen attended Greenland's teacher training college until 2007.

Since 2002, she has been a member of the Greenland Parliament, becoming Minister for Culture, Education, Sciences and Church in 2005. Since 2011, she has been deputy chair of the Greenland Committee as well as a member of The Judicial Committee, The Foreign-Policy Committee and The Defence Committee. She has been a member of the Danish Folketing for two terms: as a substitute for a short period in 2009 and as an elected MP from 2011 to 2014. She served as Greenland's Minister of Health (2015–16) and since October 2016, she has been Minister Of Education, Culture, Research and Church. She has served on the Nordic Council of Ministers for Health and Social Affairs (2015–16) and for Culture (since 2016).

In addition to her political assignments, Jensen has also been employed as a social environment worker, a shop assistant and an organizer of the youth programme Oqarit. She has been a member of the Greenland Youth Council, Sorlak, since 1992, becoming its president in 2002.

Over the years she has been reported fighting for road signs in the Greenlandic language, calling for better conditions for Greenlandic women. and acknowledging Unesco's support for Greenland's cultural heritage.
