= Kim Kielsen =

Prime Minister of Greenland from 2014 to 2021

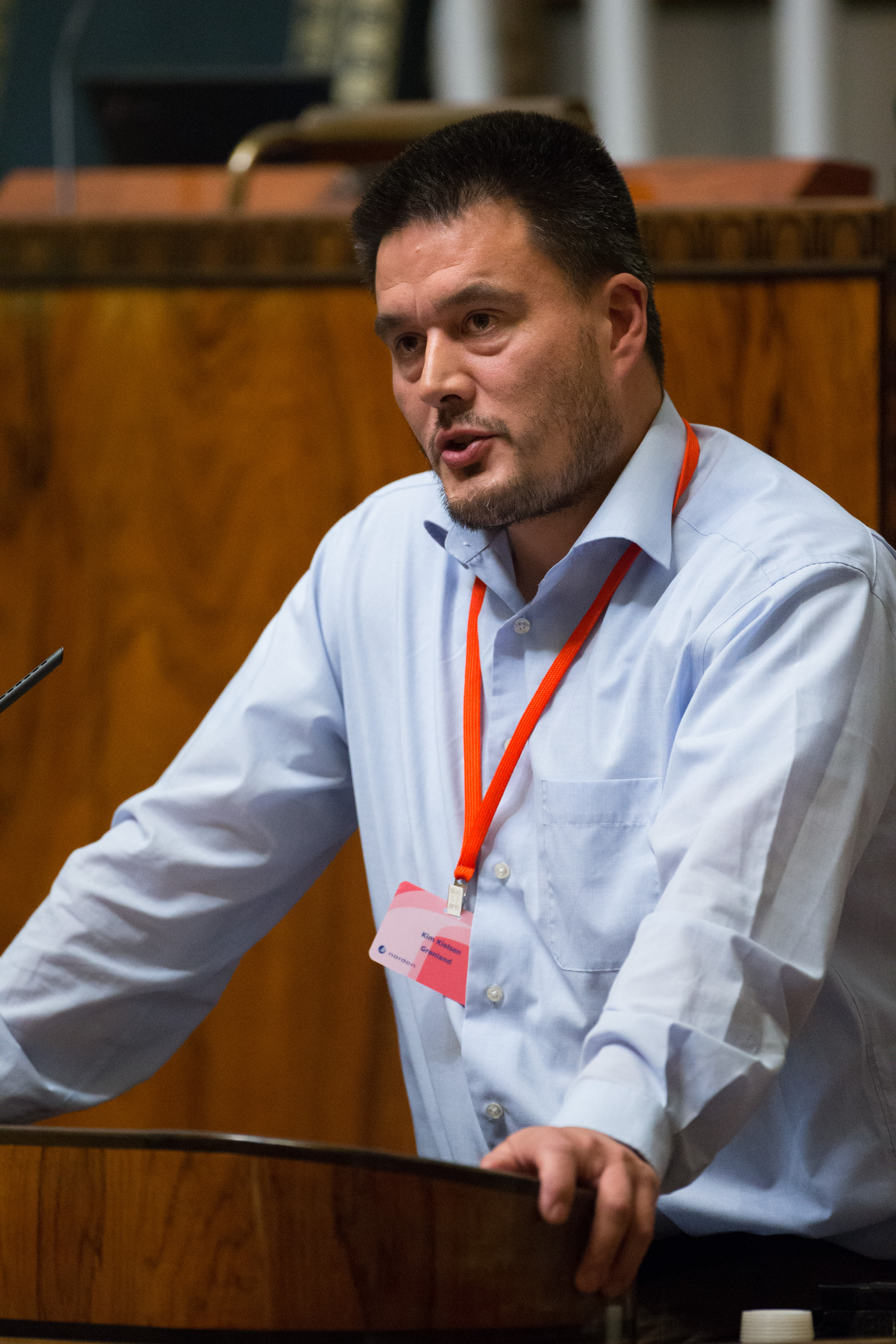
- Kielsen at Helsinki in 2012

Prime Minister of Greenland
- In office 30 September 2014 – 23 April 2021
- Monarch: Margrethe II
- Deputy: Anda Uldum
- Preceded by: Aleqa Hammond
- Succeeded by: Múte Bourup Egede

Speaker of the Inatsisartut
- Incumbent
- Assumed office 7 April 2025
- Preceded by: Mimi Karlsen

Leader of Siumut
- In office 18 October 2014 – 29 November 2020
- Deputy: Hans Enoksen
- Preceded by: Aleqa Hammond
- Succeeded by: Erik Jensen

Minister for Housing, Nature and the Environment
- In office 7 November 2013 – 23 April 2021
- Prime Minister: Aleqa Hammond; Himself

Minister for Nordic Cooperation
- In office 11 November 2013 – 23 April 2021
- Prime Minister: Aleqa Hammond; Himself

Personal details
- Born: 30 November 1966 (age 59) Paamiut, County of Greenland, Denmark
- Citizenship: Kingdom of Denmark
- Party: Siumut
- Spouse: Judithe Kielsen
- Children: 2

Kim Kielsen (born 30 November 1966) is a Greenlandic politician who has served as Speaker of the Inatsisartut since 2025, and as a member of the Inatsisartut since 2005. He was the leader of Siumut from 2014 to 2020, and the prime minister of Greenland from 2014 to 2021.

== Early life and education ==
Kim Kielsen was born on 30 November 1966. He was a police officer from 1996 to 2003.

== Career ==
In the 2005 election Kielsen won a seat in the Inatsisartut. During his tenure in the Inatsisartut he was chair of the Construction, Mineral Resources, and Conservation and Environment committees.

Kielsen was the chair of Greenland's delegation to the Nordic Council from 1 March 2006 to 1 March 2007, and 17 September 2010 to 12 March 2013. In 2013, he became Minister of Environment and Nature and Nordic Cooperation.

Aleqa Hammond resigned as president of Siumut in October 2014, after being accused of misusing public funds. With 44 out of 65 votes, Kielsen defeated Lars-Emil Johansen, Doris J. Jensen, and Nick Nielsen on 18 October 2014. He became the acting Prime Minister of Greenland. A coalition agreement between Siumut, Atassut, and the Democrats on 4 December 2014, officially made Kielsen the prime minister.

On 10 September 2018, Kielsen lost his majority when Naleraq withdrew from his coalition in protest of a Danish plan to partially fund the upgrading of two airports. On 29 September, he formed a minority government made up of Siumut, Atassut, Democrats, and Nunatta Qitornai. A motion of no confidence against him in October 2020, failed by a vote of 14 to 13, with two abstentions. Kielsen lost reelection as chair of Siumut to Erik Jensen by a vote of 39 to 32 on 29 November 2020. He was Speaker of the Inatsisartut from April 2022 to September 2023, and again since 2025.

== Personal life ==
Kielsen is married to Judithe, with whom he had two children. He can speak Danish and Greenlandic.

== Political positions ==
In response to U.S. President Donald Trump's interest in purchasing Greenland in August 2019, Kielsen stated that "Greenland is not Danish. Greenland is Greenlandic." and that the issue should not be a joke.

== Works cited ==
=== News ===
- "Greenland PM Kielsen Forms Minority Government to End Political Crisis". Voice of America. 2 October 2018. Archived from the original on 27 June 2025.
- Bloch, Cathrine (18 October 2014). "Kim Kielsen ny formand for Siumut". B.T. Archived from the original on 30 November 2024.
- Dam, Camilla (10 December 2014). "Her er navnene på det nye Naalakkersuisut". Kalaallit Nunaata Radioa. Archived from the original on 11 April 2025.
- Josefsen, Leiff (18 October 2014). "Se billeder: Kim Kielsens store triumf". Sermitsiaq. Archived from the original on 22 November 2014.
- Møller, Nauja; Brøns, Malik (29 November 2020). "Kim Kielsen tabte valget: Det er en lettelse". Kalaallit Nunaata Radioa. Archived from the original on 16 February 2025.
- Olsen, Jan; Lee, Matthew (22 April 2020). "US to boost aid to Greenland in bid to counter Russia, China". WPLG. Archived from the original on 12 March 2024.
- Wise, Justin (20 August 2019). "Greenland's leader rips Trump: Idea of buying territory 'not something to joke about'". The Hill. Archived from the original on 6 October 2022.

=== Web ===
- "Kim Kielsen". Nordic Council. Archived from the original on 19 August 2016.
- "Kim Kielsen CV". Naalakkersuisut. Archived from the original on 7 April 2016.
- "Speaker of the Inatsisartut visits the Danish Parliament". Folketing. 5 June 2025.
