= Vittus Qujaukitsoq =

Greenlandic politician

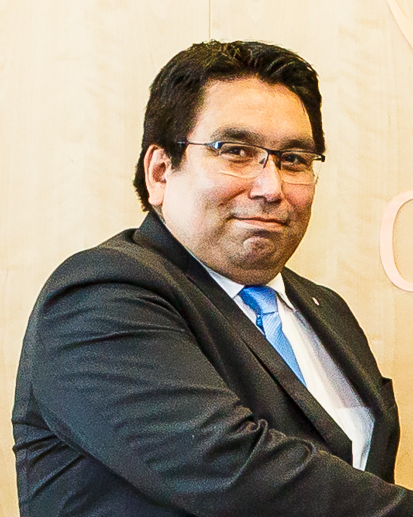
Vittus Qujaukitsoq (2016)

Vittus Qujaukitsoq (born October 5, 1971, in Qaanaaq, Greenland, Kingdom of Denmark) is a Greenlandic politician. Qujaukitsoq was appointed as Minister of Finance and Interior of Aleqa Hammond cabinet from May 2013 to November 2014. After November 2014 to 2017 Qujaukitsoq was Minister of Industry, Labour, Trade and Foreign Affairs of Kim Kielsen cabinet. After disagreements on complaint to United Nations for environmental restoration of former U.S. Military installations in Greenland. He was previously a member of Siumut, and served as Minister of Industry, Labour, Trade and Foreign Affairs, caretaker as Minister of Finance and Foreign Affairs on two occasions during 2014-2017 in the Kielsen government.

He founded the pro-independence party Nunatta Qitornai in March 2018 prior to the Parliamentary election in April 2018.

Vittus Qujaukitsoq was elected to Greenland Parliament on behalf of Nunatta Qitornai, and was appointed as Minister of Mineral Resources and Labour in May 2018 in Kim Kielsen government III. He then was appointed as Minister of Finance and Nordic Cooperation in October 2018. After the cabinet was including the Demokraatit, Qujaukitsoq has been Minister of Finance since October 2019.
