= Lund (surname) =

Lund is a common surname, principally of Danish, Swedish, Norwegian and English origin. As a common noun lund means grove in all North Germanic languages. Lund can be English and can be Scandinavian surname. Also Scandinavian and English surnames can have a particle lund. Notable people with the surname include:

== A–G ==
- Aksel Lund Svindal (born 1982), Norwegian alpine skier
- Alan Lund (1925–1992), Canadian dancer and choreographer
- Alexander Lund Hansen (born 1982), Norwegian football player
- Alma Lund (1854–1932), Finnish opera singer
- Anders Lund Madsen (born 1963), Danish journalist and entertainer
- Andreas Heldal-Lund (1964–2024), Norwegian anti-Scientology activist
- Andreas Lund (born 1975), Norwegian footballer
- Ann Lund, Australian journalist
- Anne Dorthe Lund, Danish actor
- Annfinn Lund (1926–2001), Norwegian civil servant and politician
- Anthon H. Lund (1844–1921), Politician and religious leader
- Anthony C. Lund (1871–1935), American conductor
- Arild Lund (born 1940), Norwegian politician
- Arnfinn Lund (1935–2017), Norwegian horse trainer
- Arthur E. Lund (1920–2009), American politician
- Athur Lund (1915–1990), American singer and actor
- Asger Lund Christiansen (1927–1998), Danish cellist
- Avijaja Lund Järund (1966), Danish female curler and coach
- Benjamin Lund (born 1997), Danish footballer
- Bernhard Georg Lund (1889–1968), Norwegian yacht racer
- Bernhard Oliver Lund (1910–1969), Norwegian footballer
- Bernt Lund (1812–1885), Norwegian writer and painter
- Bernt H. Lund (1924–2026), Norwegian diplomat and politician
- Bertha Lund Glaeser (1862–1939), American physician
- Bill Lund (1924–2008), American football player
- Bjarte Lund Rolland, former member of the band Kvelertak
- Bjørn Arve Lund (born 1981), Norwegian footballer
- Brennon Lund (born 1994), American baseball player
- Bodil Jerslev Lund (1919–2005), Danish chemist and educator
- Børge Lund (born 1979), Norwegian handball player
- Cajsa S. Lund (born 1940), Swedish music archaeologist and prehistorian
- Cameron Lund (born 2004), American ice hockey player
- Camilla Lund (born 1994), Norwegian speed skater
- Carl Christian Lund (1855–1940), Danish theatrical painter
- Carl Lund (1846–1912), Danish industrialist
- Carl Lund (1884–1940), Swedish wrestler
- Carl Wesenberg-Lund (1867–1955), Danish zoologist and freshwater ecologist
- Carsten Lund (born 1963), Danish computer scientist
- Cathy Lund (born 1959), Canadian rower
- Charles A. Lund (1878–1959), American politician
- Charles Robert Lund Strachan (born 1960), Scottish clan chief
- Christian N. Lund (1846–1921), American politician
- Christina Lund Madsen, Danish bridge player and journalist
- Christine Lund (born 1943), American journalist
- Corb Lund (born 1969), Canadian singer-songwriter
- Daryl B. Lund (born 1941), American food scientist and engineer
- David H. Lund, American philosopher and writer
- David Lund (1925–2023), American painter
- Deanna Lund (1937–2018), American actress
- Don Lund (1923–2013), American baseball player
- Doug Lund (1946–2024), American news anchor
- Ebba Lund (1923–1999), Danish resistance fighter and scientist
- Eddie Lund (1909–1973), American pianist
- Egil Brenna Lund (1903–1949), Norwegian footballer
- Eilert Falch-Lund (1875–1960), Sailor and businessman
- Eilert Stang Lund (born 1939), Norwegian judge
- Einer P. Lund (1903–1974), American politician
- Eivind Lund (1914–1984), Norwegian painter
- Elisabeth Lund Engebretsen (born 1973), Norwegian anthropologist
- Elmer J. Lund (1884–1969), American physiologist
- Emma Lund (born 1997), Danish Paralympic cyclist
- Emma Linnea Lund (born 1989), Swedish footballer
- Endre Lund Eriksen (born 1977), Norwegian author and politician
- Engel Lund (1900–1996), Danish-Icelandic soprano
- Erik Lund (1893–1958), German film director
- Erik Lund (born 1979), Norway rugby union player
- Erik Lund (born 1988), Swedish footballer and manager
- Erik Swane Lund (1923–2012), Danish fencer
- Erik Lund-Isaksen (born 1951), Norwegian civil servant
- Erm Lund (1914–2003), Estonian weightlifter
- Espen Næss Lund (born 1985), Norwegian footballer
- Eva Lund (born 1971), Swedish curler and Olympic gold medalist
- Eva Lund Haugen (1907–1996), American author, editor and translator
- Flemming Lund (born 1952), Danish footballer
- Francis Lund Van Dusen (1912–1993), American judge
- Frederik Lund (born 2007), Nicaraguan-Danish racing driver
- Frederik Christian Lund (1826–1901), Danish genre and history painter
- Frederik Macody Lund (1863–1943), Norwegian autodidact revisionist historian
- Fredrik Stang Lund (1859–1922), Norwegian politician
- Gabriel Lund (1773 –1832), Norwegian politician
- Garry Lund, New Zealand footballer
- Gary Lund (born 1964), English footballer
- Gerald N. Lund (born 1939), American novelist
- Gina Lund (born 1962), Norwegian politician
- Gordon Lund (1941–2024), American baseball player
- Gretchen S. Lund (born 1975), American judge
- Gudrun Lund (1930–2020), Danish composer
- Gun Lund (born 1943), Swedish choreographer and dancer
- Gunnar Lund (born 1947), Swedish diplomat and politician
- Gustav Budde-Lund (1846–1911), Danish zoologist
- Gustav Lund (1862–1912), Norwegian Sami preacher

== H–P ==
- Håkon Wibe-Lund (born 1980), Norwegian footballer and manager
- Håvard Lund (born 1970), Norwegian jazz musician and composer
- Hagbarth Lund (1877–1963), Norwegian politician
- Hans Lund-Andersen (1921–2014), Norwegian mining engineer and businessperson
- Harry Christian Lund Nielsen (born 1930), Danish rower
- Hans Lund (1950–2009), American poker player
- Hansine Lund, Norwegian stage actor
- Haviland H. Lund (1871–1940), American activist
- Hedevig Lund (1824–1888), Norwegian painter
- Helge Lund (born 1962), Norwegian businessman
- Henrik L'Abée-Lund (born 1986), Norwegian biathlete
- Henning Jakob Henrik Lund (1875–1948), Greenlandic Lutheran pastor, poet and painter
- Henning Lund-Sørensen (born 1942), Danish football referee
- Henrik Lund (born 1960), Danish engineer and professor
- Henrik Louis Lund (1879–1935), Norwegian artist
- Herman Ipsen Lund (1890–1981), Danish-American boatbuilder
- Hilda Lund (1840–1911), Swedish ballerina
- Hilda Florence Rosene Lund (1897–1978), American plant physiologist
- Hilda Mabel Canter-Lund (1922–2007), English mycologist, protozoologist, and photographer
- Howard Lund Judd (1935–2007), American medical researcher
- Israel Lund (born 1980), American painter
- Ivan Lund (1929–1992), Australian fencer
- Jack Lund Schofield (1923–2015), American politician
- Jacob Faye-Lund (born 1994), Norwegian footballer
- Jacob Lund Fisker (born 1975), Danish astrophysicist
- Jana Lund (1933–1991), US model, actress and singer
- Janni Lund Johansen (born 1976), Danish footballer
- Javed Akhtar Khan Lund (born 1962), Pakistani politician
- Jeppe Lund Curth (born 1984), Danish footballer
- Jennifer S. Lund (1940–2025), English scientist
- Jenny Lund (1916–1998), Norwegian politician
- Jenny Lund (born 1961), Australian long-distance runner
- Jens Lund (1871–1924), Danish painter, designer and graphic artist
- Jens Lund (1873–1946), Danish sculptor
- Jens Michael Lund (1872–1943), Norwegian lawyer and civil servant
- Joakim Lund Ihlen (1899–1981), Norwegian industrialist
- JoAnna Lund (1944–2006), American chef
- Jørn Lund (born 1944), Danish cyclist
- Jørn Lund (born 1946), Danish linguist
- Jochum Brinch Lund (1743–1807), Norwegian merchant
- Johan Ludwig Lund (1777–1867), Danish painter
- Johan Michael Lund (1786–1805), Prime Minister of the Faroe Islands
- Johann Lund (1638–1686), Danish pastor
- John Lund (1859–1925), German-born American conductor and composer
- John Lund (1911–1992), American actor
- John Lund (born 1954), British racing driver
- John Theodor Lund (1842–1913), Norwegian Liberal Party politician
- John Walter Guerrier Lund (1912–2015), English scientist
- Jon A. Lund (born 1928), American attorney and politician
- Jonas Lund (born 1984), Swedish conceptual artist
- Jordan Lund, American actor
- Jules Lund (born 1979), Australian television and radio broadcaster
- Julian Faye Lund (born 1999), Norwegian footballer
- Julie Lund (born 1979), Danish actress
- Julie V. Lund (born c. 1959), American judge
- Kalistat Lund (born 1959), Greenlandic politician
- Karen Lund, Archdeacon of Manchester
- Karen Lund (1881–1953), Danish actress
- Karl Lund (1888–1942), Finnish artistic gymnast
- Karoline Lund (born 1999), Norwegian handballer
- Karsten Lund (1943–2015), Danish footballer
- Kátia Lund (born 1966), Brazilian film director and screenwriter
- Katie Lund (born 1996), American soccer player
- Katrine Lund (born 1994), Norwegian sport shooter
- Kay Lund (1912–1979), German tennis player
- Khalid Ahmed Khan Lund, Pakistani politician
- Kim-André Lund (born 1990), Norwegian sport shooter
- Ketil Lund (born 1939), Norwegian judge
- Kistat Lund (1944–2017), Greenlandic graphic artist, painter and schoolteacher
- Kjell Lund (1927–2013), Norwegian architect, songwriter and singer
- Kjell Georg Lund (born 1944), Norwegian race walker
- Kjetil Lund (born 1970), Norwegian politician
- Klas Lund (born 1968), Swedish neo-Nazi and criminal
- Knut Henrik Lund (1909–1991), Norwegian sculptor
- Knut Lund (1891–1974), Finnish footballer
- Kristian Lund (1932–2012), Norwegian politician
- Kristin Lund (born 1958), Norwegian military general
- Kristin Skogen Lund (born 1966), Norwegian business leader
- Kristoffer Lund (born 2002), American soccer player
- Lage Lund (born 1977), Norwegian jazz guitarist
- Larry Lund (born 1940), Canadian ice hockey player
- Lars Erik Lund (born 1974), Norwegian ice hockey player
- Lars L'Abée-Lund (1910–1991), Norwegian police officer and judge
- Leif Lund (1942–2004), Norwegian politician
- Lene Dammand Lund (born 1963), Danish architect and educator
- Lene Lund Høy Karlsen (born 1979), Danish handball player
- Lewis Lund Judd (1930–2018), American neurobiologist and psychiatrist
- Lilleba Lund Kvandal (1940–2016), Norwegian soprano singer
- Lucas Lund Pedersen (born 2000), Danish footballer
- Lucille Lund (1913–2002), American actress
- Lydia Lund, a member of the band Chastity Belt
- Lynne Lund, Canadian politician
- Magnar Lund Bergo (born 1949), Norwegian politician
- Magnus Lund (born 1983), England rugby union footballer
- Marco Lund (born 1996), Danish footballer
- Marléne Lund Kopparklint (born 1973), Swedish politician
- Mari Leinan Lund (born 1999), Norwegian Nordic combined skier
- Mari Lund Arnem (born 1986), Norwegian politician
- Marie Lund, Swedish ski-orienteering competitor
- Marit Bratberg Lund (born 1997), Norwegian footballer
- Marita Skammelsrud Lund (born 1989), Norwegian footballer
- Martha Lund Olsen (born 1961), Greenlandic politician
- Marthe Scharning Lund (born 1976), Norwegian politician
- Marthine Lund (c. 1817–1890), Norwegian photographer
- Mary Lund Davis (1922–2008), American architect
- Masha Lund (born 1981), Danish-Russian model, actor and designer
- Mason Lund (born 2002), New Zealand rugby union player
- Matti Lund Nielsen (born 1988), Danish footballer
- Michael Lund, Australian journalist
- Mickey Lund (born 1972), Danish cricketer
- Mikkel Lund (born 1979), Danish orienteering competitor
- Morten Lund (born 1945), Norwegian politician
- Morten Lund (born 1972), Danish jazz drummer
- Morten Lund (born 1972), Danish businessman
- Mildred Lund Tyson (1895–1989), American choral director
- Mitchell Lund (born 1996), English footballer
- Nelson Lund, American legal scholar
- Nickolai Lund (born 1988), Danish association football manager
- Niels Moeller Lund (1863–1916), Danish artist
- Niels Tønder Lund, Danish zoologist
- Odin Lund Biron (born 1984), American actor
- Øystein Lund Andersen, Norwegian photographer and writer
- Ole Lund (born 1934), Norwegian lawyer
- Ole Lund Kirkegaard (1940–2001), Danish writer
- Oliver Lund (born 1990), Danish footballer
- Oluf Gabriel Lund (1873–1966), Norwegian military personnel
- Oscar A. C. Lund (1885–1963), Swedish-born American film director
- Otto Marling Lund (1891–1956), British Army general
- Pär Lund (born 1972), Swedish pianist and composer
- Pentti Lund (1925–2013), Finnish Canadian ice hockey player
- Per Berg Lund (1878–1954), Norwegian politician and jurist
- Pete Lund (born 1964), American politician
- Peter Christian Lund (1814–1891), Danish physician
- Peter Wilhelm Lund (1801–1880), Danish scientist
- Peter Lund (born 1955), British bobsledder
- Peter Lund (born 1965), German theatre director and author
- Philip Lund (born 1989), Danish professional soccer player

== R–Z ==
- Ragne Birte Lund (born 1949), Norwegian civil servant and diplomat
- Ragnvald Alfred Roscher Lund (1899–1975), Norwegian military officer
- Rasmus Lund-Nielsen (born 1988), Danish politician
- Rasmus Lund Pedersen (born 1998), Danish cyclist
- Raymond Lund (born 1940), British anatomist
- Red Lund, American gasser drag racer
- Regina Lund (born 1967), Swedish actress
- Reidar Lund (1897–1978), Norwegian cinematographer
- Richard Lund (1885–1960), Swedish actor
- Richard T. Lund, British scouting organisation leader
- Robin Lund (born 1972), Canadian baseball coach
- Rolf Lund (1930–1991), Norwegian sailor
- Rosa Lund (born 1986), Danish politician
- Signe Lund (1868–1950), Norwegian composer and music teacher
- Sigrid Helliesen Lund (1892–1987), Norwegian activist
- Sigurd Harald Lund (1823–1906), Swedish ballet dancer
- Sigurd Lund Hamran (1902–1977), Norwegian politician
- Stein Lund Halvorsen (born 1959), Norwegian sailor
- Steve Lund (born 1989), Canadian actor
- Steven J. Lund, American politician
- Steven J. Lund (born 1953), American businessman and religious leader
- Søren Robert Lund (born 1962), Danish architect
- Solveig Lund (1868–1943), Norwegian photographer
- Sonja Lund (born 1942), Swedish actress and dancer
- Steen Lund Hansen (born 1943), Danish sprint canoer
- Svend Lund (born 1949), Danish handball player
- Sverre Cornelius Lund (1931–2012), Norwegian accordion player
- Synnøve Macody Lund (born 1976), Norwegian journalist, film critic, model, and actress
- Tamara Lund (1941–2005), Finnish opera singer
- Thomas Lund (born 1970), Norwegian footballer
- Thomas Lund (born 1974), Danish ballet dancer
- Thomas Lund-Sørensen (born 1964), Danish diplomat
- Thor Lund (1921–1999), Norwegian politician
- Thorleif Lund (1880–1956), Norwegian actor
- Thure Erik Lund (born 1959), Norwegian author and cabinet maker
- Tina Lund (born 1981), Danish equestrian
- Tiny Lund (1929–1975), American racing driver
- Tobias Drevland Lund (born 1996), Norwegian politician
- Tobias Lund Andresen (born 2002), Danish cyclist
- Tom Lund (1950–2026), Norwegian footballer and coach
- Tom Benny Lund (1944–2000), Danish handball player
- Tor Lund (1888–1972), Norwegian artistic gymnast
- Troels Lund Poulsen (born 1976), Danish politician
- Troels Troels-Lund (1840–1921), Danish historian
- Ty Lund (1938–2021), Canadian politician
- Ulrik Lund Andersen (born 1972), Danish physicist
- Valdemar Lund (born 2003), Danish footballer
- Valdus Lund (1895–1962), Swedish footballer
- Valerie Lund (born 1953), British rhinologist
- Vic Lund (1902–1971), English cricketer
- Vilhelm Lund (1900–1982), Norwegian actor
- Walter Lund (born 1940), Norwegian chemist
- Zach Lund (born 1979), American skeleton racer
- Zoë Lund (1962–1999), American performer and writer

== Fictional characters ==
- Erik Lund, the character played by Peter Gantzler in Min søsters børn (My Sister's Children), a Danish film from 2001
- Ilsa Lund, the character played by Ingrid Bergman in Casablanca (1942)
- Reg Lund, the character played by Martin Hancock in Holby City
- Sarah Lund, the character played by Sofie Gråbøl in The Killing (Danish TV series)
