= Bernhard Lund =

Bernhard Lund can refer to:

- Bernhard Lund (footballer)
- Bernhard Lund (sailor)
