= Carl Lund =

Carl Lund may refer to:

- Carl Lund (industrialist) (1846–1912), industrialist
- Carl Lund (painter) (1855–1940), Danish scenic designer
- Carl Lund (wrestler) (1884–1940), Swedish wrestler
