= Kielsen II Cabinet =

Kim Kielsen II
- 15th Cabinet of Greenland
- Incumbent
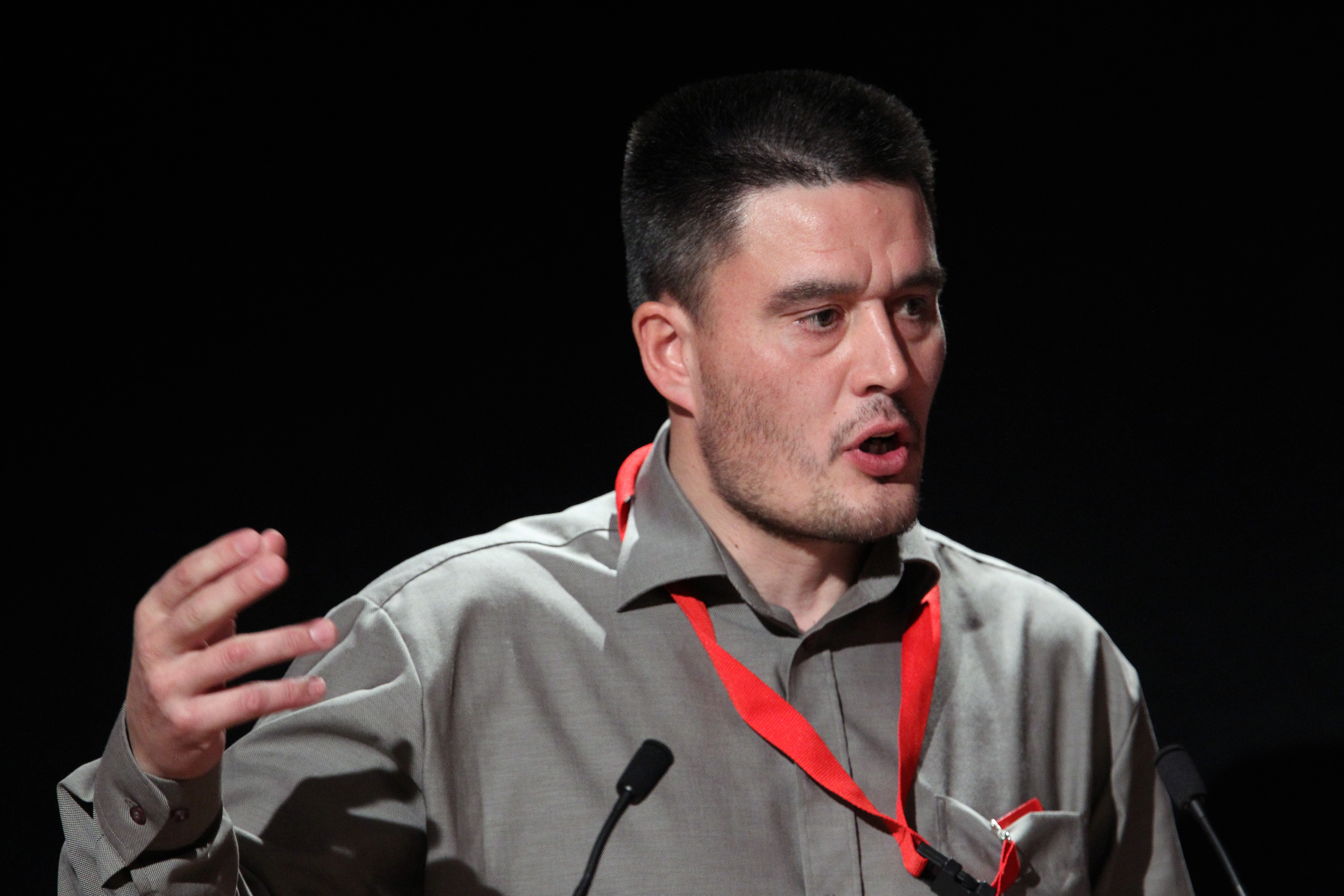
- Kim Kielsen
- Date formed: 28 June 2015
- Date dissolved: 27 October 2016

People and organisations
- Head of state: Margrethe II of Denmark
- Head of government: Kim Kielsen
- Member party: Siumut
- Status in legislature: Majority (coalition)

History
- Election: 2014 general election
- Legislature term: 2014-2018
- Predecessor: Kielsen Cabinet I
- Successor: Kielsen Cabinet III

The Second Cabinet of Kim Kielsen was the Government of Greenland, in office between 2 February 2016 and 27 October 2016. It was a coalition majority government consisting of Siumut, Demokraatit and Atassut.

== List of ministers ==
The Social Democratic Siumut had 5 ministers including the Prime Minister. The Social liberal Democrats had 2 ministers. The Liberalistic Solidarity had 2 ministers.

Cabinet members
Portfolio	Minister	Took office	Left office	Party
Prime Minister's Office
Prime Minister	Kim Kielsen	10 December 2014	27 October 2016	Siumut
Minister for Domestic Affairs	Kim Kielsen	10 December 2014	27 October 2016	Siumut
Minister for Finance and Mineral Resources	Randi Vestergaard Evaldsen	2 February 2016	27 October 2016	Democrats
Minister for Housing, Construction and Infrastructure	Knud Kristiansen	10 December 2014	27 October 2016	Atassut
Minister for Fisheries, Hunting and Agriculture	Karl-Kristian Kruse	10 December 2014	27 October 2016	Siumut
Minister for Industry, Labour and Trade	Vittus Qujaukitsoq	02 February 2014	27 October 2016	Siumut
Minister for Integration and Social Affairs, Family Affairs, Gender Equality and Minister for Health and Prevention	Martha Lund Olsen	10 December 2014	27 October 2016	Siumut
Minister for Health and Prevention and Nordic Co-operation	Doris Jakobsen	10 December 2014	27 October 2016	Siumut
Minister for Education, Research, Culture and Church	Nivi Olsen	10 December 2014	27 October 2016	Democrats
Minister for the Nature, Environment and Justice	Mala Høy Kúko	10 February 2014	27 October 2016	Atassut

== Party breakdown ==
Party breakdown of cabinet ministers:

- Forward (Social Democrats)
5
- Democrats (Social-Liberals)
2
- Unionist (Liberals)
2

== See also ==
- Cabinet of Greenland

Preceded by Kielsen I	Cabinet of Greenland; 2014–2016	Succeeded by Kielsen III
