= Ragne =

Ragne is a feminine given name. Notable people with the name include:

- Ragne Kytölä (born 1965), Finnish athlete
- Ragne Birte Lund (born 1949), Norwegian civil servant and diplomat
- Ragne Tangen (1927–2015), Norwegian children's television presenter
- Ragne Veensalu (1986–2024), Estonian stage, film, and television actress
- Ragne Wiklund (born 2000), Norwegian long track speed skater and orienteer
