= Kielsen I Cabinet =

Government of Greenland

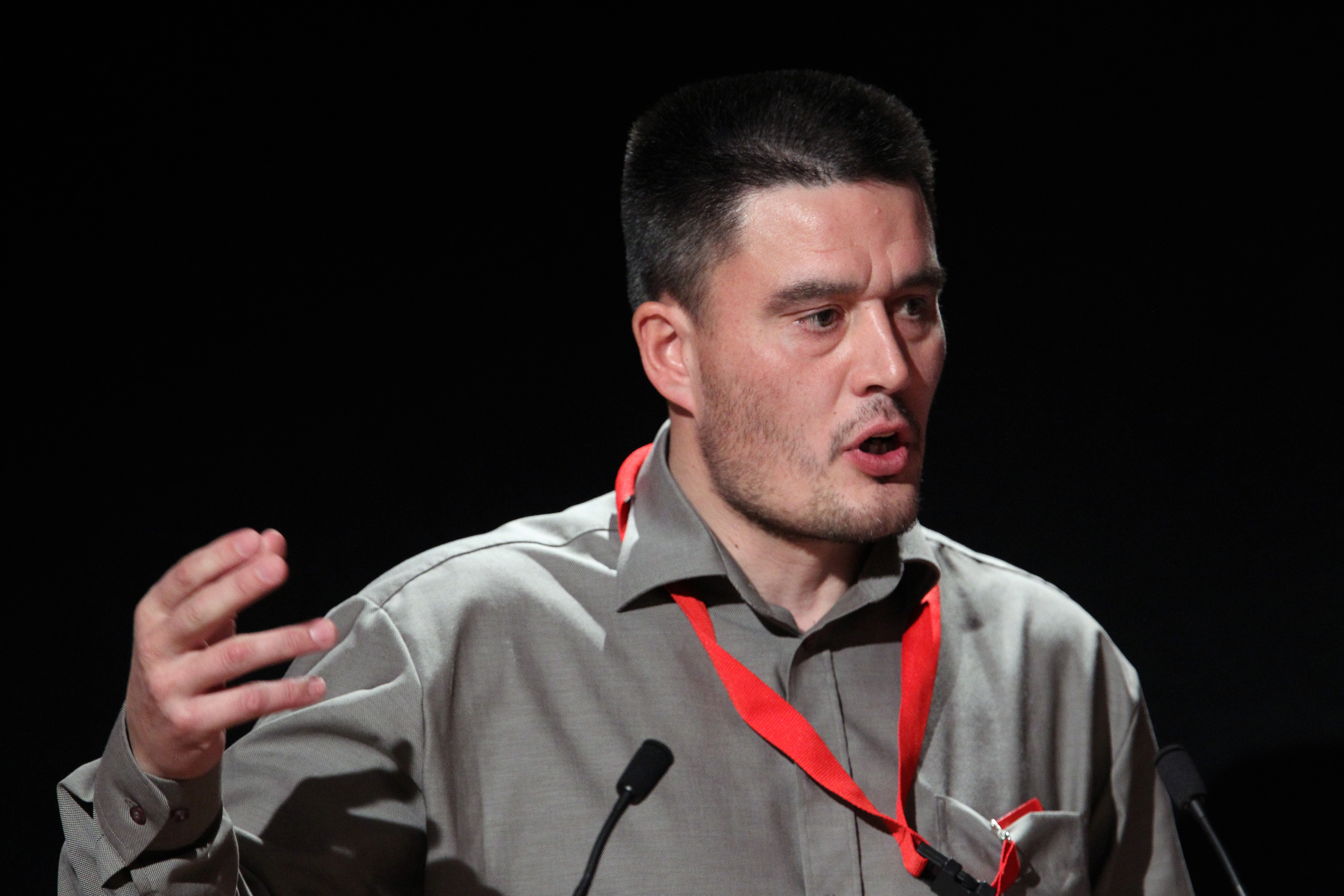
Kim Kielsen, the former premier of Greenland.

The First Cabinet of Kim Kielsen was a former administration of Greenland. It was appointed on 10 December 2014 with Kim Kielsen from Forward (Siumut) as Prime Minister, leading a coalition between Forward (Siumut), Democrats (Demokraatit) and Solidarity (Atassut). It was a majority government, composed of both right-wing and left-wing members. It was replaced by the Kielsen II Cabinet on 2 February 2016.

== List of ministers ==
The Social Democratic Siumut has 5 ministers including the Prime Minister. The Social liberal Democrats has 2 ministers. The Liberalistic Solidarity has 2 ministers.

Cabinet members
Portfolio	Minister	Took office	Left office	Party
Prime Minister's Office
Prime Minister	Kim Kielsen	10 December 2014	28 June 2015	Siumut
Deputy Prime Minister	Andreas Uldum	10 December 2014	28 June 2015	Democrats
Ministry of Domestic Affairs
Minister for Domestic Affairs	Kim Kielsen	10 December 2014	28 June 2015	Siumut
Ministry of Finance and Mineral Resources
Minister for Finance and Mineral Resources	Andreas Uldum	10 December 2014	28 June 2015	Democrats
Ministry of Housing, Construction and Infrastructure
Minister for Housing, Construction and Infrastructure	Knud Kristiansen	10 December 2014	28 June 2015	Atassut
Ministry of Foreign Affairs, Business Affairs and Employment
Minister for Foreign Affairs, Business, Employment and Nordic Co-operation	Vittus Qujaukitsoq	10 December 2014	28 June 2015	Siumut
Ministry of Nature, Environment and Justice
Minister for the Nature, the Environment and Justice	Mala Høy Kuko	10 December 2014	28 June 2015	Atassut
Ministry of Culture, Education and Science
Minister for Culture, Education, Research and Church	Nivi Olsen	10 December 2014	28 June 2015	Democrats
Ministry of Social Affairs, Family Affairs and Gender Equality
Minister for Integration and Social Affairs, Family Affairs, Gender Equality and Minister for Health and Prevention	Martha Lund Olsen	10 December 2014	28 June 2015	Siumut
Ministry Fisheries, Hunting and Agriculture
Minister for Fisheries, Hunting and Agriculture	Karl-Kristian Kruse	10 December 2014	28 June 2015	Siumut
Ministry of Health and Nordic Co-operation
Minister for Health and Prevention and Nordic Co-operation	Doris Jakobsen	10 December 2014	Leave from the Assembly reinstating the Folketing. Ministry of Health and Nordic Co-operation assigned Martha Lund Olsen and Vittus Qujaukitsoq.	Siumut

== Party breakdown ==
Party breakdown of cabinet ministers:

- Forward (Social Democrats)
5
- Democrats (Social-Liberals)
2
- Solidarity (Liberals)
2

== See also ==
- Cabinet of Greenland

Preceded by Hammond I	Cabinet of Greenland; 2014–2016	Succeeded by Kielsen II
