= Peter Lund =

Peter Lund may refer to:

- Peter Lund (theatre director) (born 1965), German theatre director, playwright, and author
- Peter Lund (bobsleigh) (born 1955), British bobsledder
- Peter Wilhelm Lund (1801–1880), Danish Brazilian paleontologist, zoologist, and archeologist
- Peter Christian Lund (1814–1891), Danish physician
- Pete Lund, member of the Michigan House of Representatives
