= Ann Lund =

Australian journalist

Ann Lund is a journalist based in Brisbane, Australia.

== Biography ==
Lund was born in the UK, is a graduate of Modern English and holds a post graduate diploma in broadcast journalism.

She worked for the BBC as a reporter, producer and presenter in radio and television, and as a specialist reporter for the BBC's political unit "Out of Westminster" in Bristol.

She worked as a lecturer in journalism at the Queensland University of Technology up to 2021.

She was winner of the Outstanding Contribution to Journalism Award at the 2021 Queensland Clarion Awards.

In 2005 she was a lead producer on a team of student journalists at Queensland University of Technology that examined the role of refugees in Australia.

The issue was controversial at the time with much negative association with the so-called illegal immigrants and boat people.

Lund helped coordinate three half-hour documentary-style programs called New Horizons, New Homes that were broadcast on the Brisbane ethnic radio station 4EB in March 2005.

The programs won the "Best Radio" category in the United Nations Association of Australia (Victoria Division) Peace Awards in 2005.

The judges found the series to be a major undertaking, showing commendable initiative in conception and production. The program was found to be highly educational, and demonstrated a lack of knowledge in the community while highlighting the importance of dissemination of proper information to the public.

Lund is married to fellow Australian journalist Michael Lund.

== Awards ==
- Queensland Clarion Awards 2021, Outstanding Contribution to Journalism
- United Nations Association of Australia Peace Award 2005, Best Radio "New Horizons, New Homes"
