= Peter Gottfred Ramm =

Danish military officer and politician

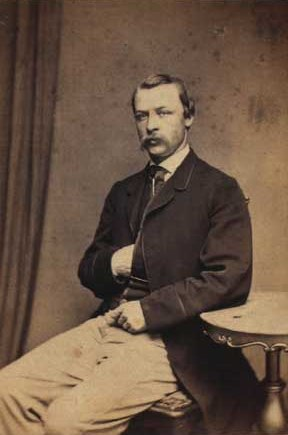
- Born: 13 January 1834; Helsingør, Denmark
- Died: 21 December 1917 (aged 83); Copenhagen, Denmark
- Occupations: Military officer, businessman and politician
- Awards: Commander of the Order of the Dannebrog

Peter Gottfred Ramm (13 January 1834 – 21 December 1917) was a Danish military officer, landowner and local politician. He initiated the redevelopment of the Vodroffsgård estate in Frederiksberg, creating Danasvej and several of other new streets in the area. He founded Frederiksberg Iron Foundry and Machine Factory in 1896.

== Early life ==
Ramm was born in Helsingør the son of greengrocer Johan Mathæus Ramm (1796–1890) and Elin Margrethe Hartelius (1804–1886).

== Military career ==
Ramm blev joined the Army in 1848 and was in 1852 appointed second lieutenant in the Infantry. He attended the Royal Army Academy in 1854-57 and was then appointed a second lieutenant in the Artillery and reached the rank of first lieutenant in 1860. He served in the Second Schleswig War in 1864. He reached the rank of captain in 1870 and retired from the army in 1886 with rank of lieutenant colonel.

== Politics and public offices ==
Ramm was a member of Frederiksberg Municipal Council in 1870-1905 and its vice chairman 1882-1895 and again in 1899–1904. In 1886–99, he was managing director and board member of Frederiksberg Tramways and Electricity Company. He was also a member of the Building Commission, Grundtakstkommissionen (chairman), Brandkomiteen og Komiteen for en heldig bebyggelse af kommunen and medlem af Centralkomiteen for København.

In 1896, Ramm founded Frederiksberg UIron Foundry and Michine Factory on Falkoner Allé and was until his death chairman of the board.

Ramm was created a Knight in the Order of the Dannebrog in 1877 and a second-rank commander in 1904. He was awarded the Cross of Honour in 1888. P.G. Ramms Allé in Frederiksberg is named after hin.

== Personal life and legacy ==
Ramm married Christiane Marie Wolff (16 July 1842 – 15 January 1926), a daughter of Niels Wolff (1793–1862, gift 1. gang 1828 med Emilie Augusta Zinn, 1807–1836) and Louise Serafine Kock (1810–1893), on 31 March 1863 in Frederiksberg.

Han er begravet på Frederiksberg Ældre Kirkegård. Der findes et portrætmaleri af Axel Helsted fra ca. 1885 i familieje. He rook over the Vodroffsgård estate from his father-in-law in the late 1860s. In 1970, he established Bernstoffsvej (now part of Danasvej) on the western part of the estate. In 1880, he also created the streets Danasvej, Sveavej, Norsvej, Magrethevej (now Suomivej) and Filipavej.

Ramm died on 21 December 1917 in Frederiksberg. He is buried at Frederiksberg Old Cemetery.

His sons Axel and Paul Ramm were both military officers.
