= Andrew McMillen =

Australian music journalist

- Education: University of Queensland
- Occupations: Music journalist; journalist; writer; author
- Years active: 2006–present
- Employer: News Corp Australia
- Known for: Music journalism
- Notable work: Talking Smack
- Awards: Full list
- Website: www.andrewmcmillen.com

Andrew McMillen is an Australian music journalist and national music writer from Brisbane, Queensland who writes for News Corp Australia publication the Australian.

He released his debut book, Talking Smack, in 2014, which documents the prevalence of illicit drug use in Australia and the Australian music industry. McMillen received the Freelance Journalism Award at the Queensland Media Awards for three consecutive years from 2015 and was the recipient of the Queensland Clarion Award at the 2017 Queensland Media Awards for his work in the Weekend Australian.

== Early life and education ==
Andrew McMillen grew up in the Queensland city of Bundaberg, the son of two teachers. In 2006, he relocated to Brisbane to study a communication studies degree at the University of Queensland.

== Career ==
McMillen contributed the chapter "The bone collector" to the Best Australian Science Writing 2016. McMillen won the 2017 Queensland Clarion Award for his body of work in the Weekend Australian.

McMillen's book Talking Smack: Honest Conversations About Drugs was published in 2014 by University of Queensland Press. David Messer of the Sydney Morning Herald called the work "a brave and important book" and noted that McMillen was "careful to provide a balance of experiences, including [those of] non-drug takers". Toby Creswell of The Newton Review of Books wrote that the "real interest" in the book "is not so much the drug tales which...are fairly repetitive" but "the insights that McMillen gives into the creative processes of [the interviewed] artists".

== Published works ==
- McMillen, Andrew (2014). Talking Smack: Honest Conversations About Drugs. University of Queensland Press. ISBN 978-0-7022-5323-2.

== Awards and nominations ==
List of Queensland Media Awards and nominations received by Andrew McMillen
Year	Nominee / work	Award	Result	Ref.
2015	Freelance Journalism Award	Published work	Won	
2016	Freelance Journalism Award	Published work	Won	
2017	Freelance Journalism Award	Published work	Won	
2017	Clarion Award	Work in the Weekend Australian	Won	
