= Lewis Judd =

American neurobiologist and psychiatrist (1930–2018)

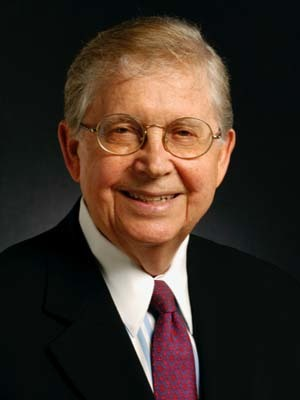

Director of the National Institute of Mental Health
- In office 1988–1990
- Preceded by: Shervert H. Frazier
- Succeeded by: Alan I. Leshner (acting)

Personal details
- Born: February 10, 1930 Los Angeles, California, U.S.
- Died: December 16, 2018 (aged 88)
- Education: University of Utah; University of California, Los Angeles

Lewis Lund Judd (February 10, 1930 – December 16, 2018) was an American neurobiologist and psychiatrist. He served as director of the National Institute of Mental Health (NIMH) from 1988 to 1992, chair of the Department of Psychiatry at the University of California, San Diego from 1977 to 2013, and as a vice president of the American Psychiatric Association. As NIMH director he helped develop the "Decade of the Brain", a research plan designed "to bring a precise and detailed understanding of all the elements of brain function within our own lifetime."

== Early life and education ==
Lewis Lund Judd was born in Los Angeles on February 10, 1930, the first of two sons of George Ezra Judd, an obstetrician-gynecologist, and Emmeline (Lund) Judd, a homemaker.

His younger brother, Howard L. Judd, was a prominent doctor in the field of women's health.

After graduating from Harvard School, a Los Angeles boys’ prep school (now part of the coeducational Harvard-Westlake School), Judd entered the University of Utah, where he completed a degree in psychology in 1954. He studied medicine at George Washington University and at the University of California, Los Angeles, finishing his medical degree in 1958. He completed his internship and a residency in psychiatry at UCLA. After a stint in the military as base psychiatrist at Griffiss Air Force Base in Rome, NY, he joined the UCLA psychiatry faculty.

== University of California, San Diego ==
In 1970, Arnold J. Mandell, the founding chairman of the psychiatry department at the University of California, San Diego, recruited Judd. The two built the department from the ground up, making it a leader in federal research funding. It was while consulting on an outside program to help adolescents with drug problems that Judd met a social worker, Patricia Hoffman, whom he married. Judd succeeded Mandell as department chair in 1977.

In 1987, after helping to build the UC San Diego psychiatry department into a leader in biology psychiatry research, he was chosen to take over the National Institute of Mental Health in Bethesda, MD, the world's largest source of funding for brain and behavior research. As head of the NIMH, he worked with President George H. W. Bush to put in place the Decade of the Brain, a designation given to the 1990s by Bush in a collaborative effort between the Library of Congress and the National Institutes of Health (NIH) to "enhance public awareness of the benefits to be derived from brain research".

In 1992, Judd returned to UC San Diego as chair of Department of Psychiatry. He remained there for 36 years (until 2013) and became a recognizable public face in brain science. He also maintained a small clinical practice, specializing in treating severe depression.

== Death and legacy ==
Judd died from cardiac arrest on December 16, 2018, in San Diego. He was 88. Besides his wife Patricia Judd, a clinical professor of psychiatry at the UCSD School of Medicine, he got survived by three daughters—Stephanie Judd, a psychologist; Catherine Judd, a professor of English at the University of Miami; and Allison Fee, an occupational therapist—and five grandchildren.

Dr. Igor Grant, chair of the Department of Psychiatry at UCSD, said Judd's leadership laid the groundwork for today's BRAIN (Brain Research through Advancing Innovative Neurotechnologies) Initiative, begun under President Barack Obama. "We will celebrate his incredible contributions," Grant said, "not just to our Department, School, and University, but to the field of Mental Health internationally."
