= Danasvej =

Street in Copenhagen, Denmark

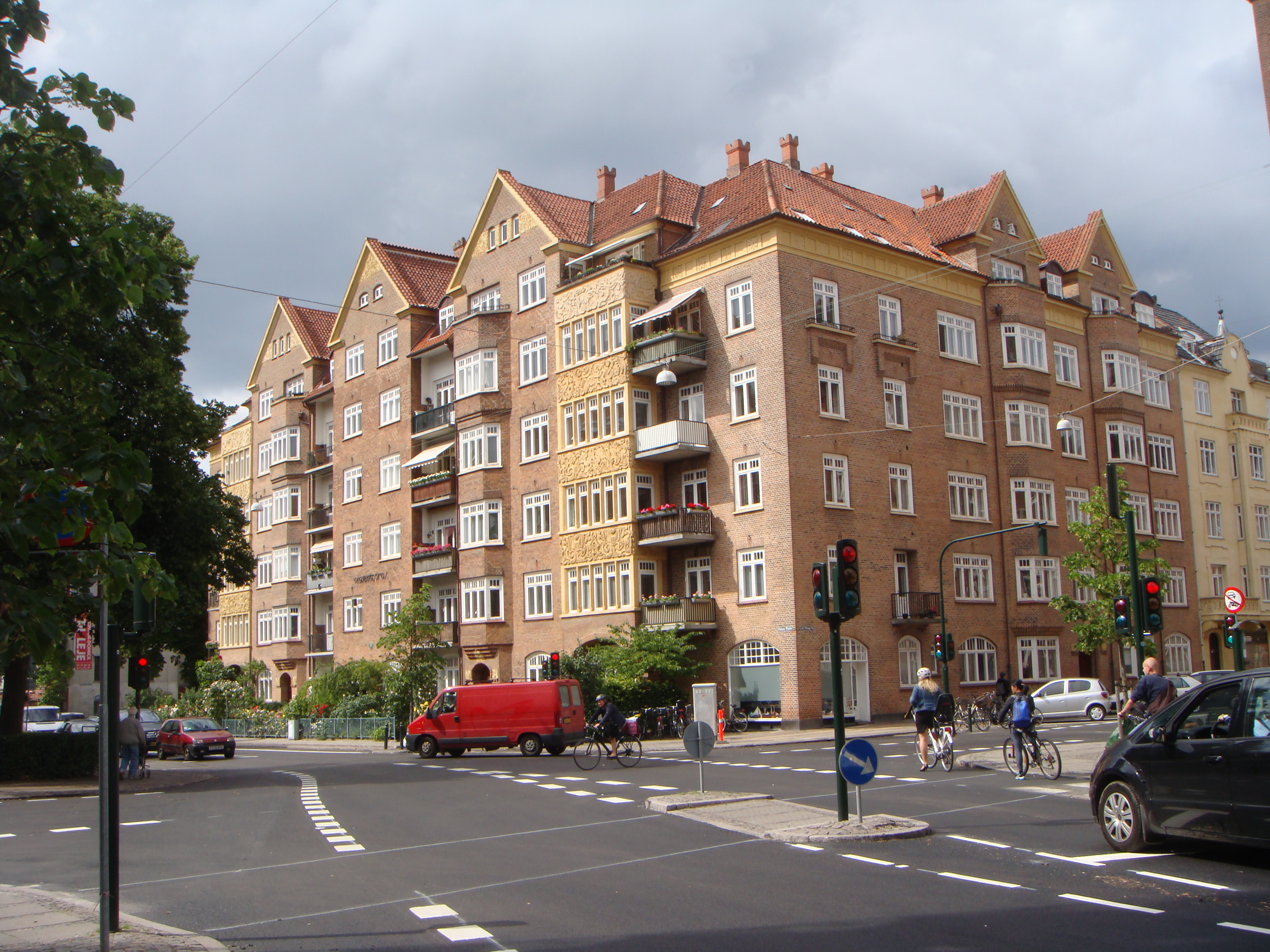
- Length: 550 m (1,800 ft)
- Location: Copenhagen, Denmark
- Quarter: Frederiksberg
- Nearest metro station: Forum
- East end: Kampmannsgade
- Major junctions: Vodroffsvej
- West end: H. C. Ørsteds Vej

Danasvej is a street in the Frederiksberg district of Copenhagen, Denmark, linking the Kampmannsgade embankment across St. Jørgen's Lake in the east with H. C. Ørsteds Vej in the west. The central, section of the street, from Vodroffsvej to Svend Trøsts Vej, is called Danas Plads (Dana's Square") but the street and square are continuously numbered. The Danas Plads buildings, built in 1906–1909 to a National Romantic design by Ulrik Plesner and Thorvald Bindesbøll, surrounds a rectangular, public space with greenery and a playground.

== History ==
=== Vordroffsgård ===
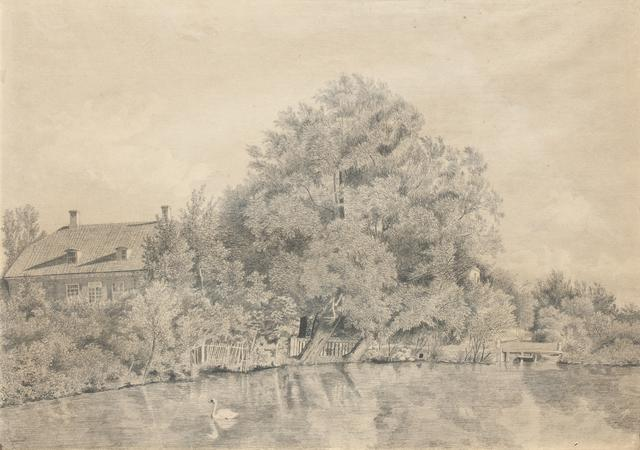
Vodroffsgård

Quartermaster Georg Julius Wodroff purchased a piece of land at the site in 1698 and established the Vodroffgård watermill at the mouth of the Ladegård Canal. It was originally built as a fulling mill but was soon adapted for other use. In 1702, he obtained a 12-year monopoly on the manufacture of rolled barley and snus as well as on operating sharpening and polishing mills within a distance of three Danish miles from Copenhagen. From 1733, Vodroffgård was used for manufacturing ship sails with a monopoly on deliveries to the Danish navy.

Hartvig Marcus Frisch, director of the Royal Danish Greenland Company, owned the property from 1794 to 1803. He discontinued the industrial activities in the 1790s and began exclusively using the estate as a summer retreat. In 1803, Vodroffsgård was acquired by Carl Ludvig Zinn. Zinn died in 1808 . After his widow's death in 1847, Vodroffsgård passed to their daughter Emilie Augusta Zinn and her husband Niels Wolff.

=== Bernstorffsvej and Danasvej ===
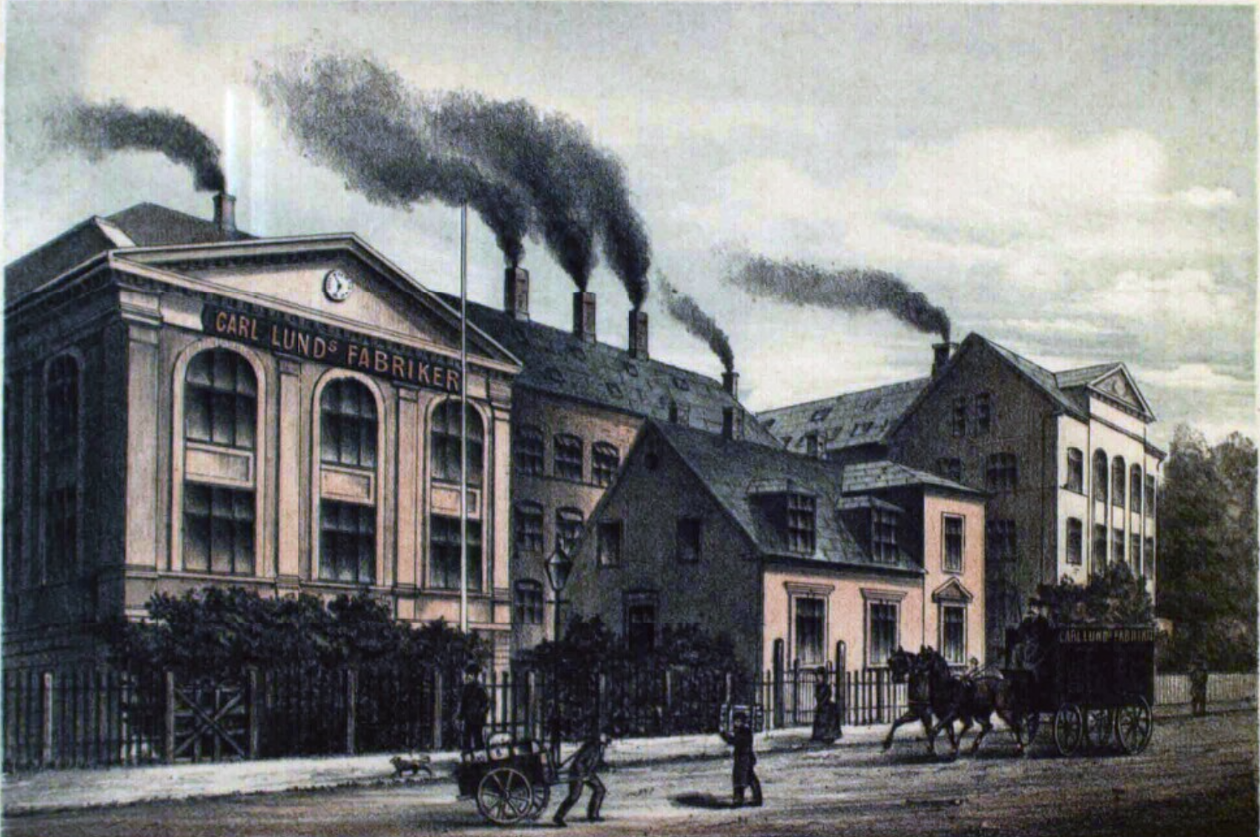
Carl Lunds Fabrikker

Niels Wolff died in 1862. Houses for three of Niels Wolff's children had been built in 1853–1855 on the east side of Vordroffsvej. The northernmost of the houses, located at Emilievej 6, went to his daughter Christine Marie Wolff. She had married military officer Peter Gottfred Ramm a few years earlier. Vodroffgård was operated as an entertainment venue from 1868 under the name Vodroffslund. The western part of present-day Danasvej, from H. C. Ørstedsvej to Svend Træsts Vej, was created in 1769 and was then called Bernstorffsvej. Carl Lunds Fabriker, a manufacturer of ironware, was built on the north side of the street in 1871.

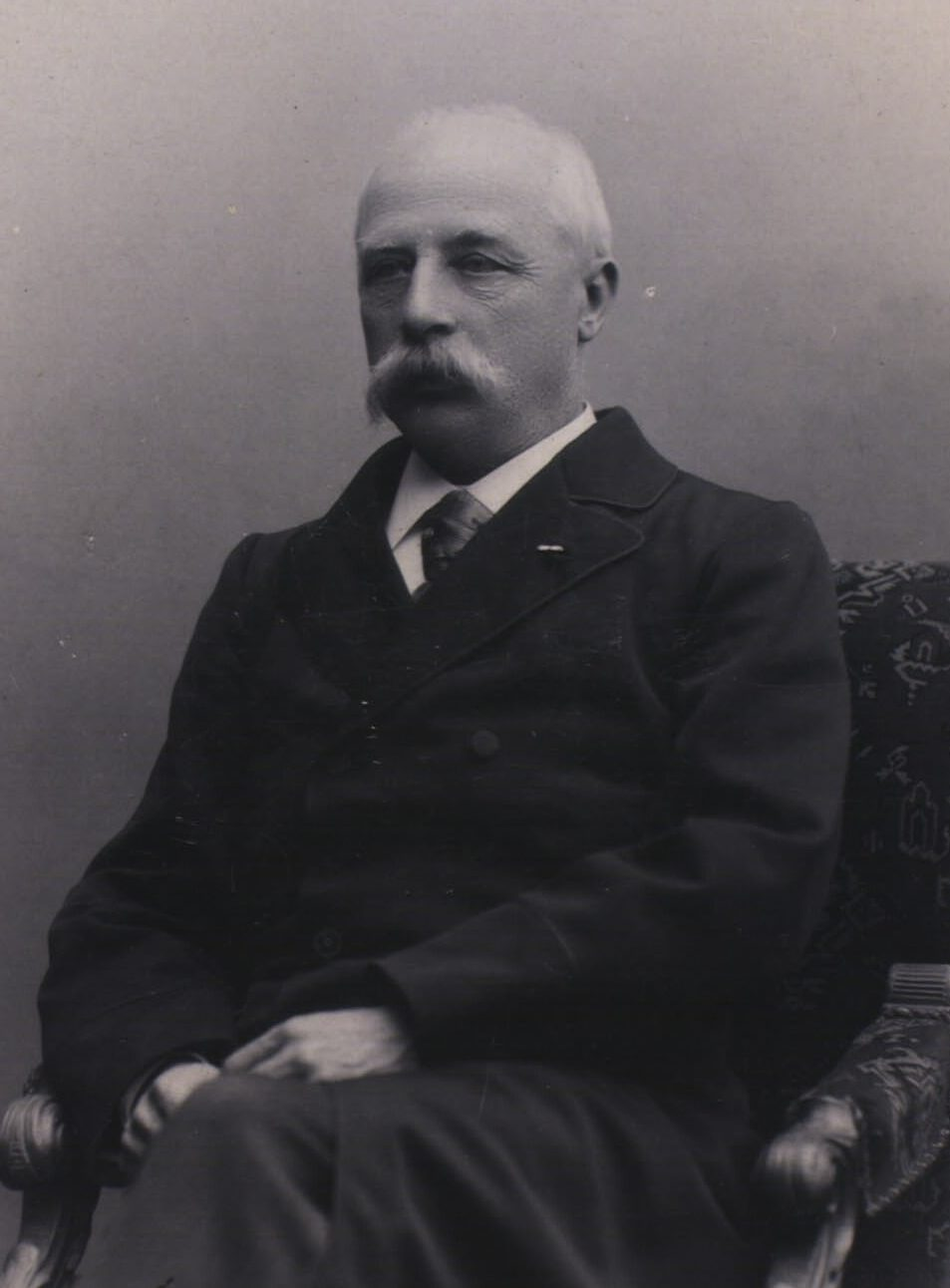
Peter Gottfred Ramm.

In circa 1880, Ramm established several new roads on the property and sold off the land in lots. Ramm, who was a supporter of Scandinavism, named three of the new streets Danasvej, Sveasvej and Norsvej after Denmark, Sweden and Norway. Two other streets were named Margrethevej and Fillipavej after two queens of the Kalmar Union. Margrethesvej was in 1918 renamed Suomivej after Finland.

One of the first buildings at Danasvej was a villa (No. 8, later No. 1) designed by thorvald Bindesbøll for the painter Vilhelm Kyhn. He operated a painting school for women on the first floor and his studio was located in the garden. Josephine Schneider's Orphanage was from 1880 to 1928 located at No. 5–7.

=== 20th century ===
Danasvej and Bernstorffsvej were connected when the Vodroffs Plads development was built in 1906–1907. In 1927, Frederiksberg Municipal Council decided to rename Bernstorffsvej Danasvej. In 1934, Vodroffs Plads was also renamed Danas Plads.

== Notable building and residents ==
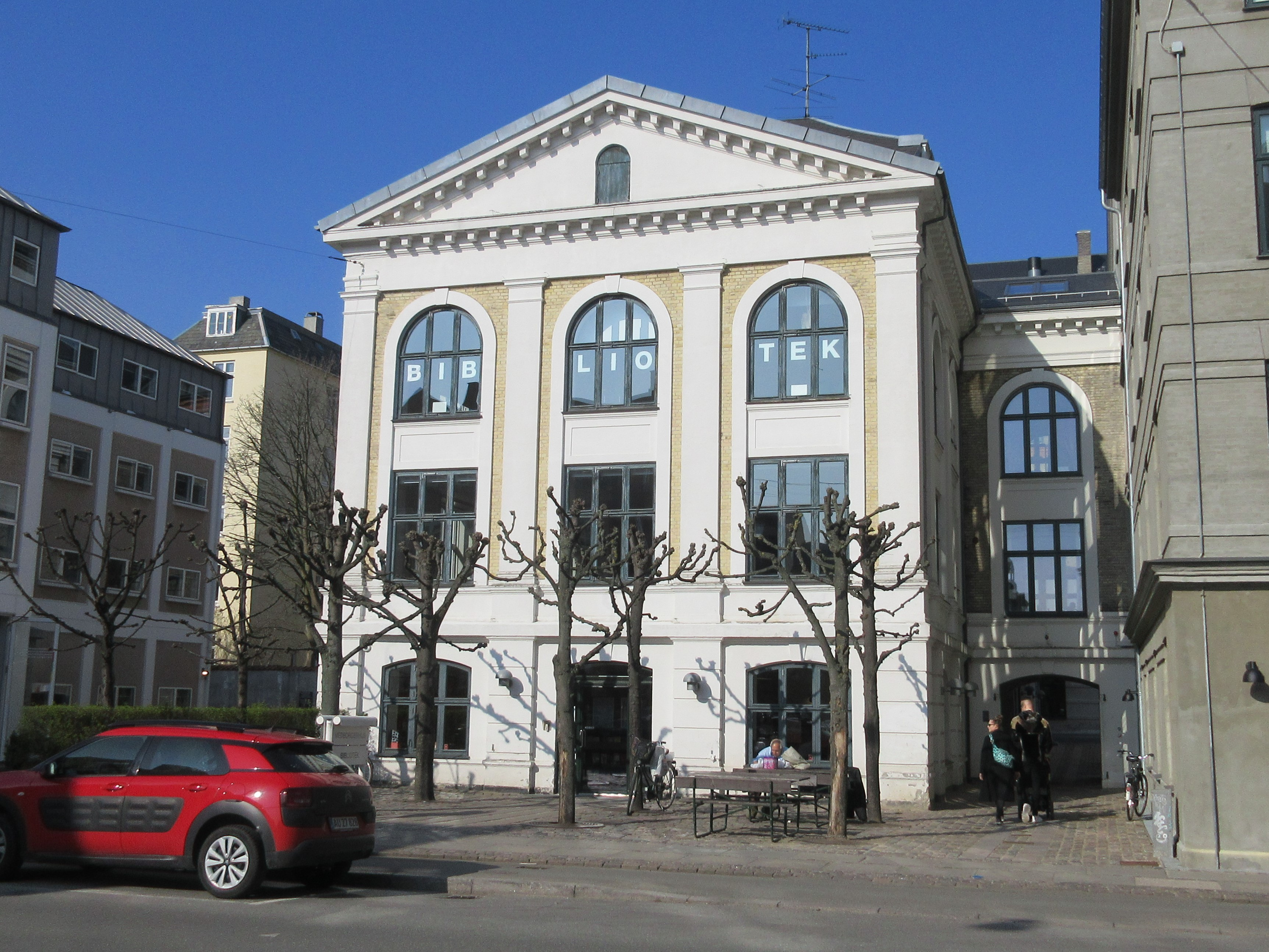
Danasvej Library

Danasvej Library (No. 30) is located in one of the former Carl Lunds Fabrikker buildings.

The Danas Plads development is from 1906 to 1909 and was designed by Ulrik Plesner and Thorvald Bindesbøll. Vodroffshus /Danasvej 2–4/Svend Trøsts Vej 12/Carl Plougs Vej 7, another apartment building from 1908, was also designed by Plesner but this time in collaboration with Aage Langeland-Mathiesen. The corner building at Danasvej 15–17 is from 1917 was designed by Valdemar Schmidt.

Hassinghus (No. 5–7) was built for Josephine Schneider's Orphanage in 1921 after its former building from 1880 had been destroyed in a fire. The orphanage relocated to a new building on Peter Rørdams Vej in 1928. Hassings Forlag og Trykkeri, a publishing house, was based in the building from 1846 to 1983. No. 5–7 was then home to the Danish Social Democratic Party headquarters. In 2015–2017, it was converted into apartments.

== Public art ==
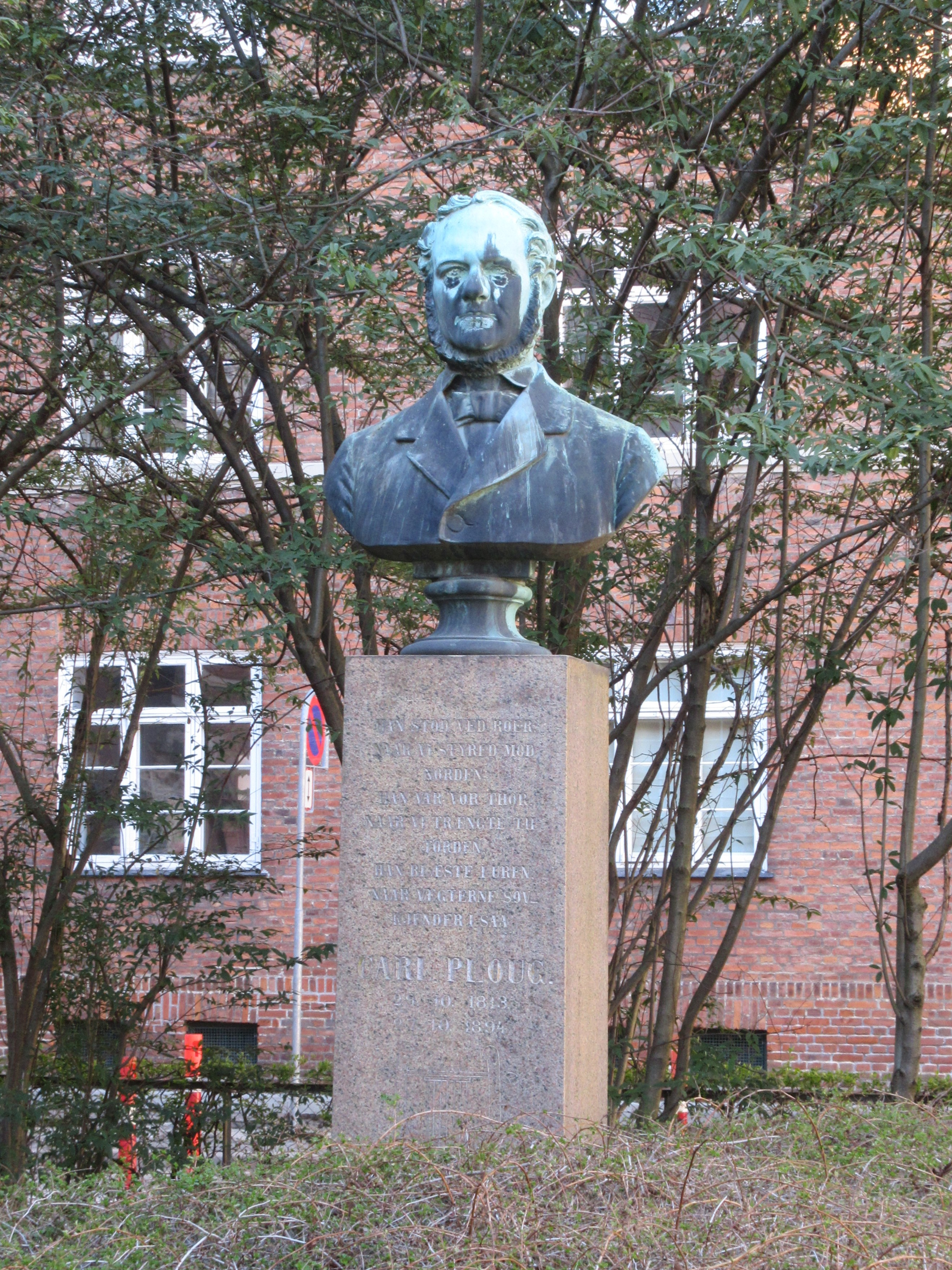
Bust of Carl Ploug

In a small garden complex at the corner of Carl Plougs Vej and Danasvej stands a bust of poet and politician Carl Ploug. The bust was created by Vilhelm Plessen. It was originally placed outside the Student Association's building on H. C. Andersens Boulevard but was moved to its current location in 1972.

== Transport ==
The nearest Copenhagen Metro station is Forum. Movia bus line 39 passes through the street.

The Albertslund Route of Copenhagen's network of super bikeways passes through the street.
