= HORESTA =

- Abbreviation: HORESTA
- Formation: 1886
- Type: Trade association
- Purpose: Umbrella trade association for worldwide hotel restaurant industry
- Headquarters: Vodroffsvej 32, 1900 Frederiksberg
- Region served: Denmark
- Members: Respective national trade associations
- Chief Executive Officer: Pia E. Voss
- Website: www.horesta.dk

HORESTA is a trade association and employers organization for the restaurant, hotel and tourism industry in Denmark. It organises just under 2000 companies from the industry.

== History ==
HORESTA was founded as Centralforeningen af Hotelværter og Restauranter in 1884. Im 1992, it merged with Arbejdsgiverforeningen for Hoteller og Restauranter under the name HOREFA. Its current name was introduced in 1995.

== Location ==
HORESTA is based at Vodroffsvej 32 in the Frederiksberg district of Copenhagen. Danmarks Rejsebureau Forening, Foreningen af Forlystelsesparker i Danmark, Danhostel, DAB (Dansk Automatbrancheforening), Danske Sommerhusudlejere, Bocuse d’Or, Green Key and Best Western are also tenants in the building.
