= Kjetil Lund =

Norwegian politician (born 1970)

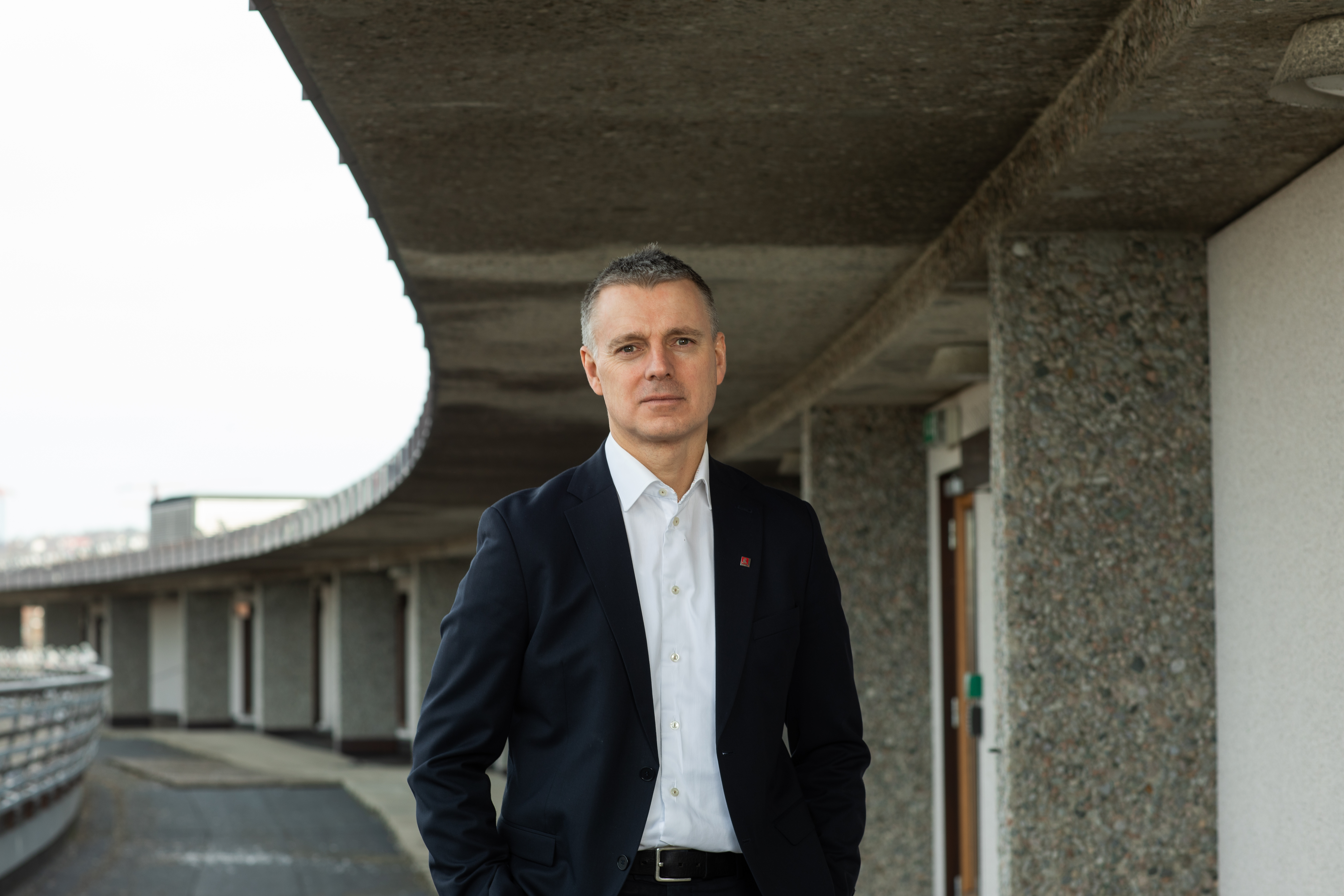

Director of the Norwegian Water Resources and Energy Directorate
- Incumbent
- Assumed office 1 April 2019
- Preceded by: Anne Britt Leifseth (acting)

Oslo City Commissioner for Business and Ownership
- In office 19 December 2017 – 28 February 2019
- Governing Mayor: Raymond Johansen
- Preceded by: Geir Lippestad
- Succeeded by: Marthe Scharning Lund

Personal details
- Born: 12 June 1970 (age 56) Vigrestad, Rogaland, Norway
- Party: Labour

Kjetil Lund (born 12 June 1970) is a Norwegian civil servant and politician for the Labour Party.

He hails from Vigrestad. He studied at the University of Bergen from 1990, taking the cand.mag. degree in 1992. In 1996 he took the cand.polit. degree in economics. From 1997 he worked one year in Statistics Norway, before being hired in the Ministry of Finance. After advancing through the hierarchy, and spending the years 2003 to 2005 as an adviser in Tanzania, he was hired as a senior adviser in the Office of the Prime Minister at the inception of Stoltenberg's Second Cabinet in 2005. In 2009 he changed job, to State Secretary in the Ministry of Finance. He remained such until Stoltenberg's Second Cabinet fell in October 2013. In 2014 he was an adviser to Stoltenberg, who was now a UN Special Envoy on Climate Change.

Kjetil Lund was subsequently an executive in Statkraft. In 2017 he was appointed to the city government of Oslo as City Commissioner of Business and Ownership, succeeding Geir Lippestad. In 2018 Lund was nominated as the new director of the Norwegian Water Resources and Energy Directorate and assumed office the following year. He was succeeded by Marthe Scharning Lund as City Commissioner.

Political offices
Preceded by Geir Lippestad	Oslo City Commissioner of Business and Ownership; 2017–2019	Succeeded by Marthe Scharning Lund
Civic offices
Preceded by Anne Britt Leifseth (acting)	Director of the Norwegian Water Resources and Energy Directorate; 2019–	Succeeded by Incumbent
