= Martha Lund Olsen =

Greenlandic politician (born 1961)

Member of the Greenlandic Parliament
- In office 2014–2018

Personal details
- Born: 28 April 1961 (age 64) Upernavik, Greenland, Kingdom of Denmark
- Citizenship: Kingdom of Denmark
- Party: Siumut

Martha Lund Olsen (born 28 April 1961) is a Greenlandic politician (Siumut).

== Early life and career ==
Martha Lund Olsen is the daughter of head teachers Louis Olsen and Ane Lund and thus the younger sister of politician Johan Lund Olsen. She was trained in Copenhagen as a social counselor and therapist and then studied at the Social College in Copenhagen and at the University of Greenland in Nuuk.

== Political career ==
Olsen first ran in the 2013 general election to gain a seat in parliament. However, she missed this goal with only 64 votes. Nevertheless, she was subsequently appointed by Aleqa Hammond as Minister for Justice and Family Affairs in the Hammond I Cabinet and in the same year in the Hammond II Cabinet. On 3 October 2014, she was also appointed interim Minister for Education, Church, Culture and Equal Rights.

Barely two months later, the parliamentary elections took place, in which Olsen received 226 votes, the fourth most of all Siumut candidates. With that she moved into Inatsisartut for the first time. Kim Kielsen then appointed her to the Kielsen I Cabinet, where she was appointed Minister for Social Affairs, Family Affairs and Equal Rights. On 23 May 2016, she also took over the judicial department from Mala Høy Kúko. In October 2016, the Kielsen II Cabinet was inaugurated, where Olsen was appointed Minister for Communities, Villages, Infrastructure and Housing.

In January 2017, Olsen told Kielsen that she wanted to stand in the 2017 municipal elections, who, to her surprise, fired her as minister on 27 January. She then took her seat in Parliament. In May, she received the most votes for the Siumut in the municipality of Sermersooq with 482 votes and thus a seat on the municipal council, but lost to incumbent mayor Asii Chemnitz Narup with 2259 votes. On 1 December 2017, she became social director of the municipality of Sermersooq, which is why she took a leave of absence from the municipal council. Because of this, she did not stand again in the 2018 parliamentary elections.
