= Brennon Lund =

American baseball player (born 1994)

- Outfielder
- Born: November 27, 1994 (age 31); Salt Lake City, Utah, U.S.
- Bats: Left Throws: Right

Brennon Reed Lund (born November 27, 1994) is an American former professional baseball outfielder.

== Amateur career ==
Lund attended Bingham High School in South Jordan, Utah, where he played baseball. In 2013, his senior year, he helped Bingham win the Utah 5A baseball state championship. Undrafted out of high school in the 2013 Major League Baseball draft, he enrolled at Brigham Young University (BYU) where he played college baseball.

In 2014, Lund's freshman year at BYU, he hit .303 with 19 RBIs and 11 stolen bases in 52 games, earning a spot on both the All-West Coast Conference First Team and the WCC All-Freshman Team. After the 2014 season, he played collegiate summer baseball in the Cape Cod League for the Yarmouth-Dennis Red Sox, winning the Cape League Championship. As a sophomore at BYU in 2015, Lund batted .308 with one home run and 27 RBIs in 53 games. That summer, he played in the Northwoods League for the Battle Creek Bombers. In 2016, his junior year, Lund slashed .387/.454/.531 with two home runs, 34 RBIs, and 15 stolen bases in 54 games, earning All-WCC First Team honors. After the season, he was drafted by the Los Angeles Angels in the 11th round of the 2016 Major League Baseball draft.

== Professional career ==
=== Los Angeles Angels ===
Lund signed with the Angels and made his professional debut with the Orem Owlz of the Rookie Advanced Pioneer League before being promoted to the Burlington Bees of the Single-A Midwest League. Over 63 games between both clubs, he hit .307 with three home runs and thirty RBIs. Lund returned to Burlington to begin 2017 before earning promotions to the Inland Empire 66ers of the Class A-Advanced California League and Mobile BayBears of the Double-A Southern League during the season. Over 121 total games, he slashed .308/.373/.403 with six home runs, 47 RBIs, and twenty stolen bases. He spent all of the 2018 season with Mobile, hitting .264 with eight home runs, 59 RBIs, and 21 stolen bases. Lund spent the 2019 season with the Salt Lake Bees of the Triple-A Pacific Coast League, slashing .284/.350/.455 with eight home runs and 51 RBIs over 98 games.

Lund did not play a minor league game in 2020 due to the cancellation of the minor league season caused by the COVID-19 pandemic. For the 2021 season, he was assigned back to Salt Lake, slashing .224/.277/.409 with 11 home runs and 38 RBIs over 79 games. Lund did not play in a game for the Angels organization in 2022 due to an undisclosed injury and was released on May 19, 2022.

=== Tecolotes de los Dos Laredos ===
On May 31, 2022, Lund signed with the Tecolotes de los Dos Laredos of the Mexican League. In 36 games for the team, he batted .287/.355/.361 with no home runs, 15 RBI, and 3 stolen bases. After not playing in the 2023 season, Lund was released by the Tecolotes on February 6, 2024.
