= Gabriel Lund =

Norwegian politician (1773 –1832)

Gabriel Jochumsen Lund
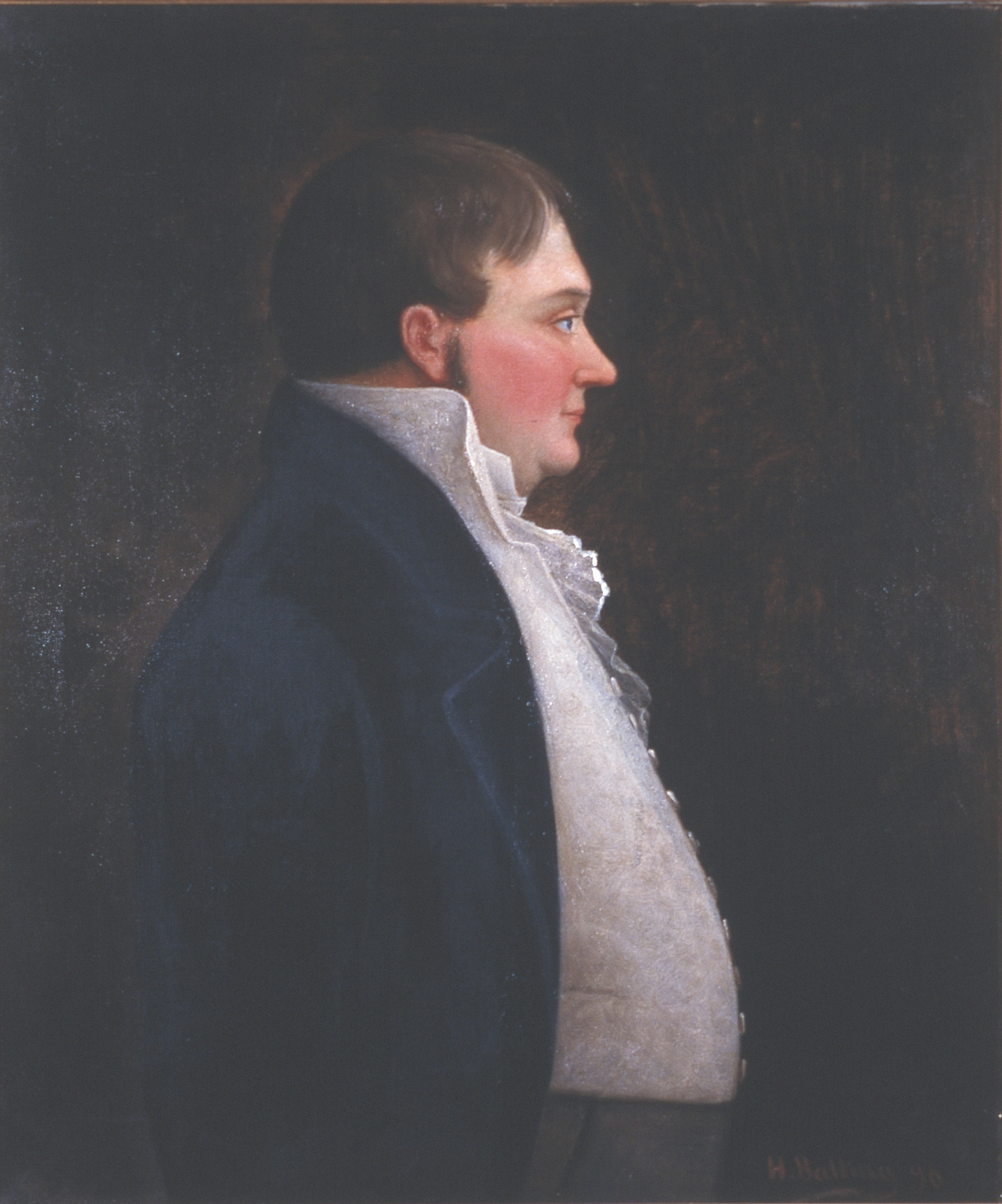
- Born: 4 October 1773; Farsund, Norway
- Died: 3 November 1832 (aged 59)
- Parent: Jochum Brinch Lund

Gabriel Lund (4 October 1773 – 3 November 1832) was a Norwegian merchant and representative at the Norwegian Constituent Assembly.

== Biography ==
Gabriel Jochumsen Lund was born in Farsund in Lister og Mandal county, Norway. He graduated with a degree in theology in 1795 but did not join the ministry. He was engaged in trade in Farsund with his father, merchant, trader and shipowner Jochum Brinch Lund (1743-1807) He subsequently took over the trading house and ran it until 1830. Later he served as postmaster in Trondheim. He represented Lister amt at the Norwegian Constituent Assembly in 1814. He was a member of the Finance Committee and supported the independence party (Selvstendighetspartiet).

He was a member of the Parliament of Norway from 1827 to 1830 representing Lister and Mandals amt.

He was married to Gidsken Edvardine Røring (1781-1841) with whom he had seven children. The family resided at Husan Manor in Farsund which had been built by Jochum Brinch Lund ca 1800. The original wooden structure was partially destroyed by fire in 1940. It was later restored and is now in use as the Farsund City Hall (Husan, Farsunds rådhus). In 1990, the city of Farsund received the “Europa Nostra” prize for the successful restoration of the former manor house.

== Other sources ==
- Abrahamsen, Olav Arild (1997) Farsund bys historie (Farsund kommune) ISBN 978-8299436816

== Related Reading ==
- Stylegard, Frans-Arne (2014) Gabriel Lund og Husan i Farsund in De kom fra alle kanter - Eidsvollsmennene og deres hus (edited by Jørn Holme, published by Cappelen Damm) ISBN 978-82-02-44564-5
