= Walter Lund =

Norwegian chemist (born 1940)

Walter Lund (born 31 January 1940) is a Norwegian chemist.

He was born in Oslo. He took the cand.real. degree at the University of Oslo in 1965, and later the dr.philos. degree. He was hired at the university in 1966, and was promoted to professor in 1989. He has been a visiting scholar at the National Physical Laboratory, the Heyrovský Institute of Polarography and the Scripps Institution of Oceanography. His field is analytical chemistry, and he has been vice president of this particular field within the International Union of Pure and Applied Chemistry (IUPAC). He has also chaired the board of the Museum of Cultural History.

He retired in 2010, and resides in Oslo and Cros-de-Cagnes.
