= Hedevig Lund =

Norwegian painter (1824–1888)

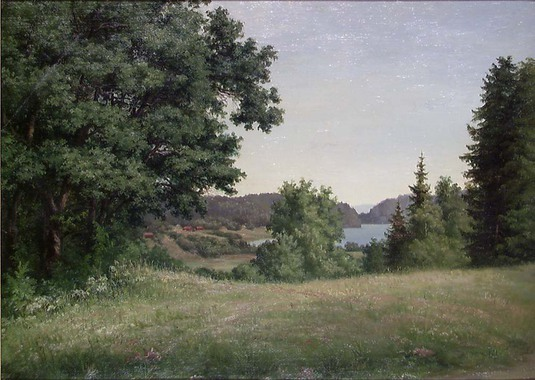
Landskapsstudie Borrevannet (Lake Borre Landscape Study), oil on canvas pasted on cardboard, 32 × 44.5 cm, kept at the National Museum of Art, Architecture and Design

Hedevig Thorine Christine Erichsen Lund (June 11, 1824 – March 16, 1888) was a Norwegian painter.

== Biography ==
Lund was born in Kristiansand, the daughter of Ole Wilhelm Erichsen (1793–1860) and Abel Marie née Isaachsen (1803–1883). Her father was a member of the Council of State and minister of the navy, and he owned the Semb farm in Borre in Vestfold county, Norway.

Lund is particularly known for her portraits, and she created many commissioned works for Eidsvollsbygningen gallery depicting members of the National Assembly. She also painted landscapes, including Landskapsstudie Borrevannet (Lake Borre Landscape Study, 1878), which is displayed in the National Museum of Art, Architecture and Design.

She married the officer, writer, and painter Bernt Lund in 1847. Together they painted the altarpiece Jesus i Getsemane (Jesus in Gethsemane), which is displayed today in Stokken Church.

She died in Christiania (now Oslo).
