= Jochum Brinch Lund =

Norwegian merchant (1743–1807)

Jochum Brinch Lund (25 November 1743, in Farsund – 16 September 1807, in Farsund) was a Norwegian merchant, shipowner and industrial pioneer. He is also regarded as the founder of the town of Farsund.

Not much is known about Jochum Brinch Lund's early years, just that he was overseas for a short period, working with his father's business relations in United Kingdom and France, and that he sailed as skipper a couple summer seasons. In 1765 he returned to Farsund. 4 October 1773 his son Gabriel Lund was born. In 1783 he bought up his father's trading house. Lund was also one of the main benefactors behind the construction of Frelseren Church, consecrated 5 May 1785. He started many businesses and enterprises, and because of that Farsund got town status on 28 January 1795. It was also around this time that he had built a large merchant house, which today is called Husan. He was called in his own time "The King of Farsund".

But at the start of the Gunboat War the businesses went downhill and Lund died 16 September 1807.
