= Randi Vestergaard Evaldsen =

Greenlandic politician

Member of Parliament of Greenland
- In office November 2014 – July 2019
- Preceded by: Anda Uldum
- Succeeded by: Niels Thomsen

Personal details
- Born: 13 April 1984 (age 42) Greenland
- Citizenship: Kingdom of Denmark
- Party: Democrats

Randi Vestergaard Evaldsen (born 13 April 1984) is a Greenlandic former politician and former member of the Inatsisartut. She was the acting chairman of the Democrats and a member of Ministry of Finance (Denmark) before leaving politics in 2019 to take a position at Brugseni as purchasing manager. Vestergaard Evaldsen has a degree in service economics with a specialization in tourism and an Academy Profession Graduate degree in international trade and marketing from the Greenland Business School Business.
