= Bernt Lund =

Norwegian writer and painter (1812–1885)

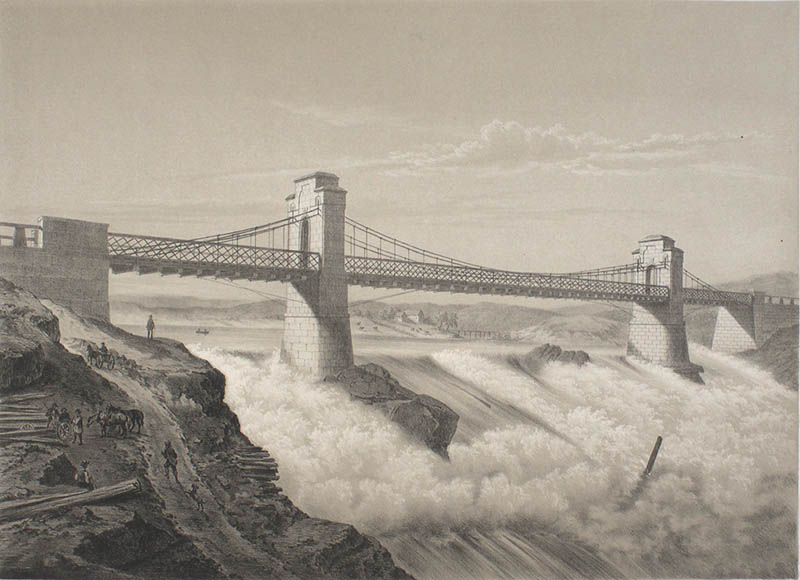
View of Sarpefossen (1848)

Bernt Lund (July 14, 1812 – October 30, 1885) was a 19th-century Norwegian landscape artist, author and military officer.

== Biography ==
Lund was born in Våler in Hedmark, Norway. He took military officer exam in 1837 and spent his career in the Norwegian Army advancing to Captain in 1863. However, he later resigned to dedicate himself to engineering.

He also trained as an artist. He attended art school with landscape painter Thomas Fearnley (1839-1840). He studied landscape art under the influence of Hans Gude in Düsseldorf (1844-1845). Besides painting, Lund was also active as a writer. He published a book of poetry in 1882. He especially became known as the author the poem Trysil-Knud (1861), which was used as an inspiration for the 1942 Norwegian film Trysil-Knut. His work is also featured in Christian Tønsberg's illustrated volume Norge fremstillet i Tegninger (Norway Presented in Drawings, 1846–1848).

From 1853 to 1878, Lund was employed by the Norwegian Public Roads Administration.

== Personal life ==
In 1847, he married the painter Hedevig Erichsen. He died in Christiania (now Oslo).

== Gallery ==
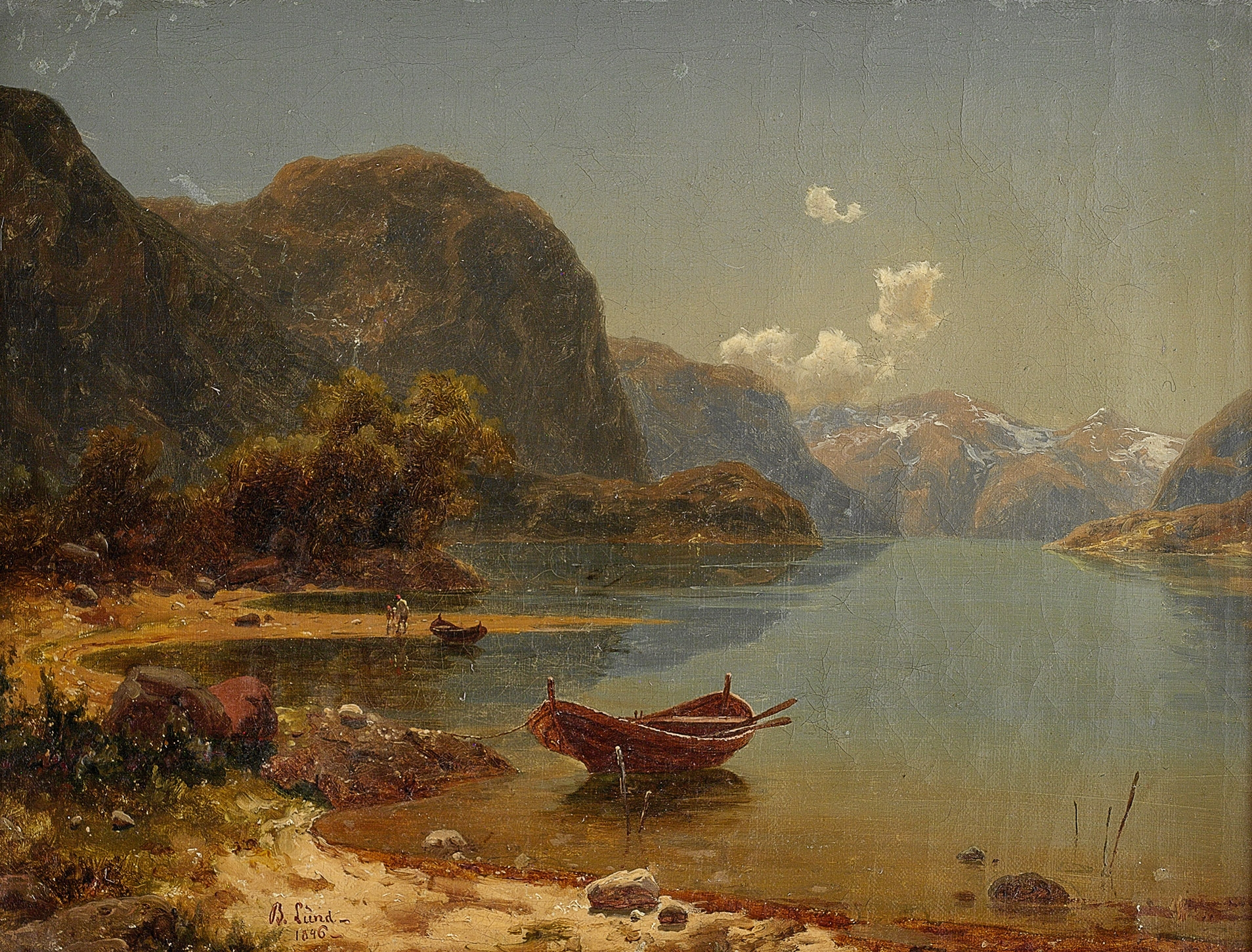
Fjord Landscape with Figures

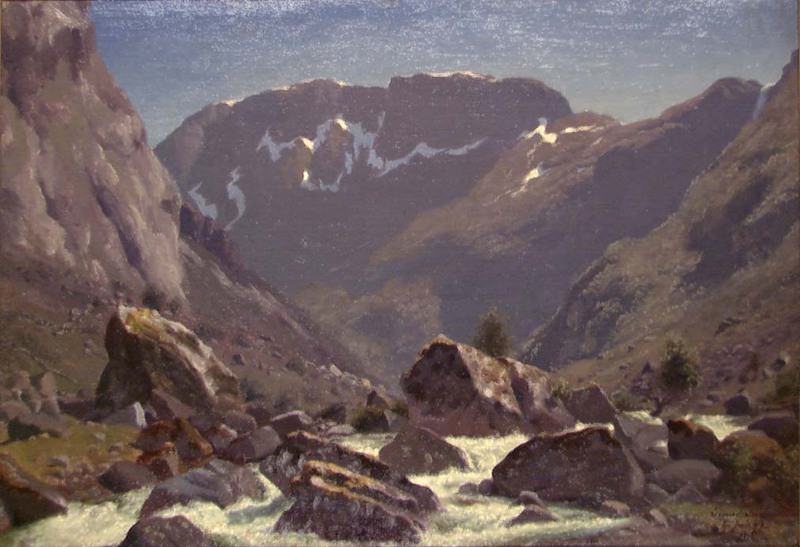
Landscape Study from Simedal (1849)

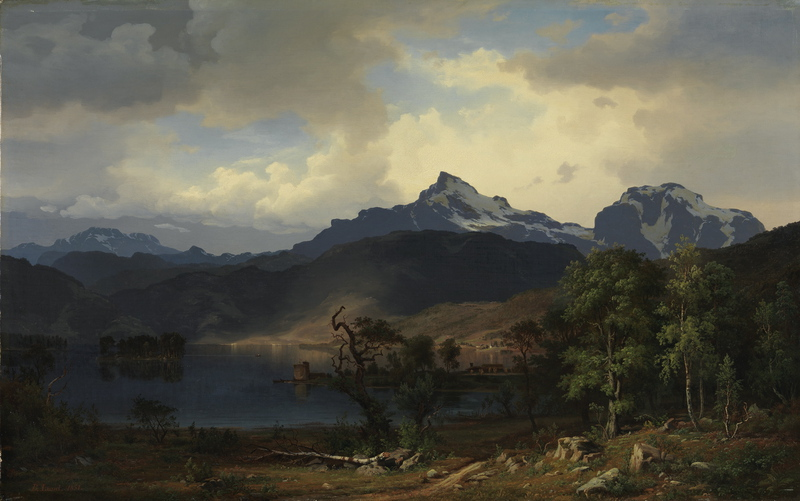
From Ulvik in Hardanger (1851)
