= Arnold J. Mandell =

American neuroscientist and psychiatrist (born 1934)

Arnold J. Mandell (born 1934) was an American neuroscientist and psychiatrist. Born in 1934, in Chicago, Illinois, he received his B.A. from Stanford University in 1954 and his M.D. from Tulane University in 1958. Founding chairman in 1969 of the Department of Psychiatry at the University of California, San Diego, he was, at the time of his appointment, the youngest physician ever appointed as a chairman of a medical school psychiatry program in the U.S. An early biological psychiatrist, the department was the first in the U.S. to be biologically oriented. After leaving UCSD, he was involved in studying the basic science and applied mathematics of brain activity and behavior.

He was the director of research of the Cielo Institute, a clinical professor of psychiatry at Emory University, a research professor of health and wellness at University of North Carolina, Asheville, professor of psychiatry at University of California, San Diego, visiting scientist at the Core MEG Lab at the National Institutes of Health, and a senior research associate at Scripps Research Institute.

He passed away in August of 2026.

== Awards ==
- 1984 MacArthur Fellows Program
- A.E. Bennett Research Prize of the Society for Biological Psychiatry
- 1994 Senior Humboldt Prize Fellowship in Dynamical Systems, Bremen University
- Foundations Fund Research Prize of the American Psychiatric Association
- Johananoff International Prize Fellow in Psychopharmacology (Mario Negri Institute, Milan, Italy).

== Partial list of works ==
- Psychochemical Research in Man: Methods, Strategy, and Theory (with Mary P. Mandell) (1969) ISBN 9780124680500
- New Concepts in Neurotransmitter Regulation (1973) ISBN 0306307375
- The Nightmare Season (1976) ISBN 0394402529
- Coming of Middle Age: A Journey (1977) ISBN 0671400088
- Perspectives in biological dynamics and theoretical medicine (with Stephen H Koslow, Michael F. Shlesinger) (1987) ISBN 0897664043
- "Psychoanalysis and Psychopharmachology", in Modern Psychoanalysis: New Directions and Perspectives, Editor Judd Marmor, Transaction Publishers, 1995, ISBN 9781560008255
- The Nearness of Grace: A Personal Science Of Spiritual Transformation (2005)
- Don Juan in the Mind - article - publication unknown - likely from the 1970s
