= Michael Lund =

Australian journalist

Michael Lund is a journalist based in Brisbane, Queensland, Australia. He was the winner in the 2004 Queensland Media Awards for his report on the pitch invasion at the 2003 Rugby World Cup. He was also "highly commended" in the Walkley Awards for his report on Peter Hollingworth and Hollingworth's dealings with child abuse allegations when Anglican Archbishop of Brisbane.

== Personal life ==
Lund was born in March 1965 in Horbury, Yorkshire, and is a graduate of mathematics and applied physics at the then Manchester Polytechnic and holds a master's in pure mathematics from the University of Liverpool. He studied print journalism at Stradbroke College in Sheffield.

He has worked for a number of news organisations in the United Kingdom, including as a bi-media correspondent for the BBC, and as a reporter at the Bristol Evening Post, the Sheffield Star, and other local newspapers.

In 1998, he emigrated to Australia and has worked for The Courier-Mail and The Sunday Mail newspapers in Queensland, the ABC in radio and television – including for the popular television program Australian Story – has lectured and tutored in journalism at the Queensland University of Technology, worked as a science and technology editor and commissioning editor for the Australian and New Zealand arm of The Conversation and as a senior finance journalist for Canstar. He is now a newsletter editor for News Corp Australia.

== Awards ==
- Queensland Media Awards – Best Sports Report – Electronic Media (2004)

"Pitch Invasion" – ABC Local Radio

- Walkley Awards – Highly Commended (2002)

"What Hollingworth Knew" – ABC Local Radio

- Australian Museum Eureka Prizes – Best Coverage of Research and Technology – Finalist (2004)

"Eye of a Needle" – Australian Story
