= Marthe Scharning Lund =

Norwegian politician (born 1976)

Oslo City Commissioner for Health
- In office 9 February 2023 – 25 October 2023
- Governing Mayor: Raymond Johansen
- Preceded by: Robert Steen
- Succeeded by: Saliba Andreas Korkunc

Oslo City Commissioner for Business and Ownership
- In office 28 February 2019 – 23 October 2019
- Governing Mayor: Raymond Johansen
- Preceded by: Kjetil Lund
- Succeeded by: Victoria Marie Evensen

Deputy Member of the Storting
- In office 1 October 2017 – 30 September 2021
- Constituency: Oslo
- In office 1 October 1997 – 30 September 2005
- Constituency: Telemark

Personal details
- Born: 5 July 1976 (age 50) Skien, Telemark, Norway
- Party: Labour

Marthe Scharning Lund (born 5 July 1976) is a Norwegian politician for the Labour Party.

== Political career ==
=== Youth league ===
Lund first joined the Workers' Youth League (AUF) when she was thirteen years old. She has described her time with AUF as helping her learn "the importance of politics and engagement".

=== Parliament ===
She served as a deputy representative to the Storting from Telemark from 1997 to 2005. Following the 2005 election, she was appointed as a political adviser in the Ministry of Children and Families, serving in Stoltenberg's Second Cabinet. She later served as a deputy representative from Oslo during the terms 2017–2021. In total she met for 256 days of parliamentary session.

She was also a political adviser in the Labour Party parliamentary group.

=== Local politics ===
In the city government of Oslo, Lund became chief of staff for Raymond Johansen, later to serve briefly as City Commissioner of Business and Ownership from February to October 2019.

In 2021, her successor Victoria Marie Evensen named Lund to chair the board of Oslo Port Authority.

On 9 February, she was appointed Oslo City Commissioner for Health, succeeding Robert Steen. Following the 2023 local elections, she was succeeded by Saliba Andreas Korkunc.

After Raymond Johansen was appointed secretary-general for Norwegian People's Aid, Lund became the group leader for the Oslo Labour Party in the Oslo City Council.

Though she was considered the local party's likeliest candidate for Oslo Governing Mayor ahead of the 2027 local elections, Lund was challenged by former city commissioner Usman Mushtaq and she withdrew her candidacy after the Oslo Workers' Youth League (AUF) had signalled their support for Mushtaq.

== Personal life ==
She hails from Skien. She has one brother. Lund has cited her grandmother as one of her biggest role models and her father as one of her staunchest supporters.

Political offices
Preceded by Kjetil Lund	Oslo City Commissioner of Business and Ownership; 2019	Succeeded by Victoria Marie Evensen
Preceded by Robert Steen	Oslo City Commissioner of Health; 2023	Succeeded by Saliba Andreas Korkunc
