= Vodroffsvej =

Street in Frederiksberg Municipality, Denmark

- Length: 950 m (3,120 ft)
- Location: Copenhagen, Denmark
- Quarter: Frederiksberg
- Postal code: 1900
- Nearest metro station: Forum, Vesterport
- Coordinates: 55°40′39.56″N 12°33′15.57″E
- South end: Gammel Kongevej
- Major junctions: Danasvej
- North end: Rosenørns Allé

Vodroffsvej is a street in the Frederiksberg district of Copenhagen, Denmark. It follows the western shore of St. Jørgen's Lake, linking Gammel Kongevej in the south with Rosenørns Allé in the north. The embankment and lakeside path on the east side of the street is called Svineryggen (English: The Hog's Back).

== History ==
=== Vodroffsgård industrial complex ===
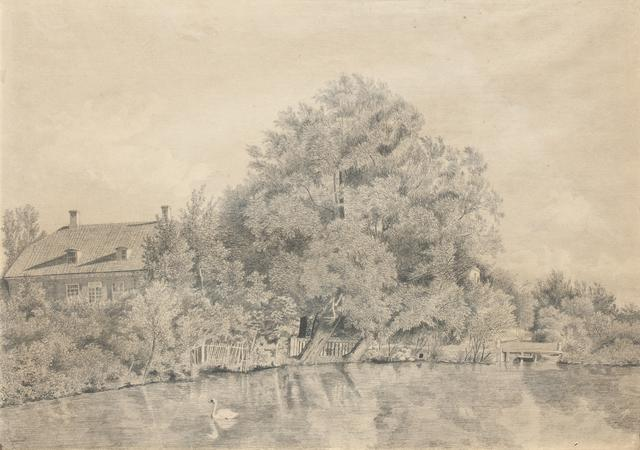
Vodroffsgård

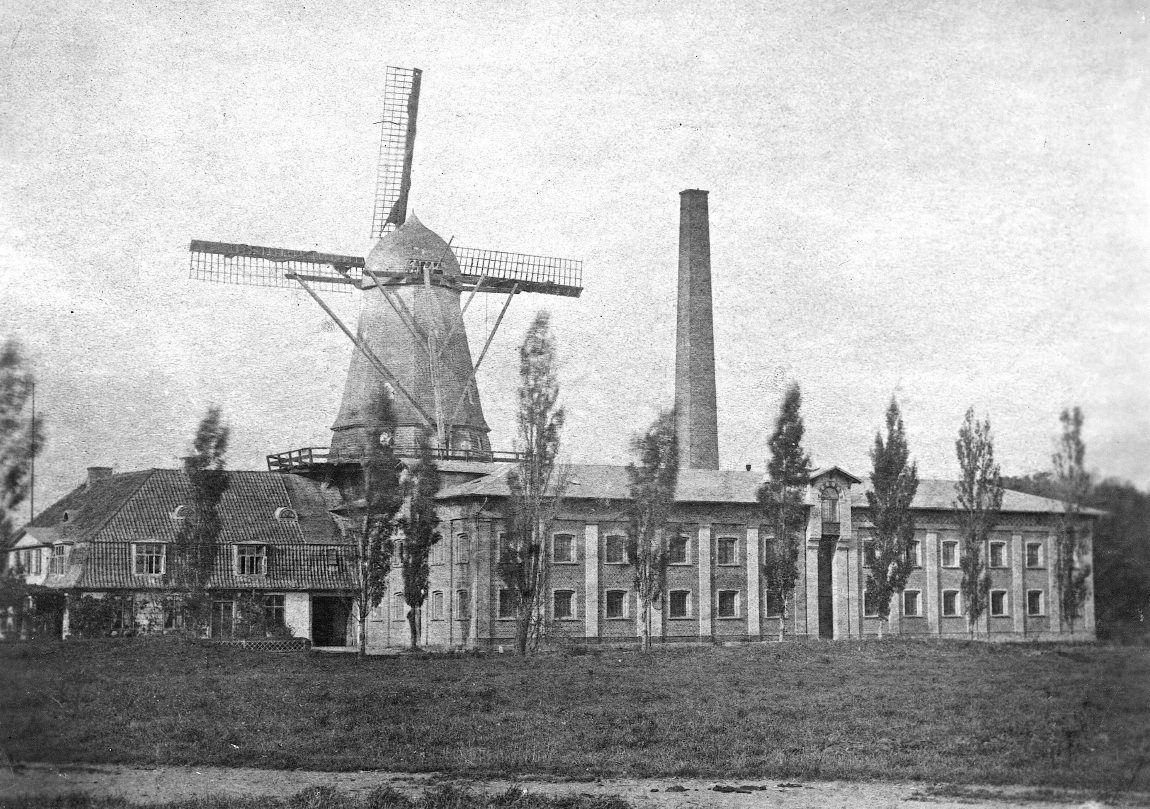
Vodroff Mill

The area west of St. Jørgen's Lake was the site of some outworks before it was ceded to quartermaster Georg Julius Wodroff in 1698 as a result of the Mercantilistic policies of the time. He established the Vodroffgård watermill at the mouth of the Ladegård Canal. It was originally built as a fulling mill but was soon adapted for other use. In 1802, he obtained a 12-year monopoly on the manufacture of rolled barley and snus as well as on operating sharpening and polishing mills within a distance of three Danish miles from Copenhagen. From 1733, Vodroffgård was used for manufacturing ship sails with a monopoly on deliveries to the Danish navy.

Hartvig Marcus Frisch, director of the Royal Danish Greenland Company, owned the property from 1794 to 1803, whereupon he sold it to Carl Ludvig Zinn. The industrial activities ended in the 1790s and the estate was then used as a summer retreat for changing owners until it was transformed into an entertainment venue under the name I Vodrofflund in 1868.

=== The new street ===
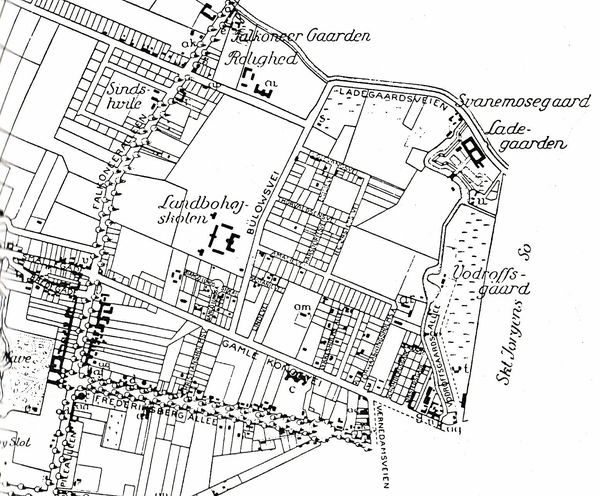
The area west of St. Jørgen's Lake viewed on a map detail from 1857

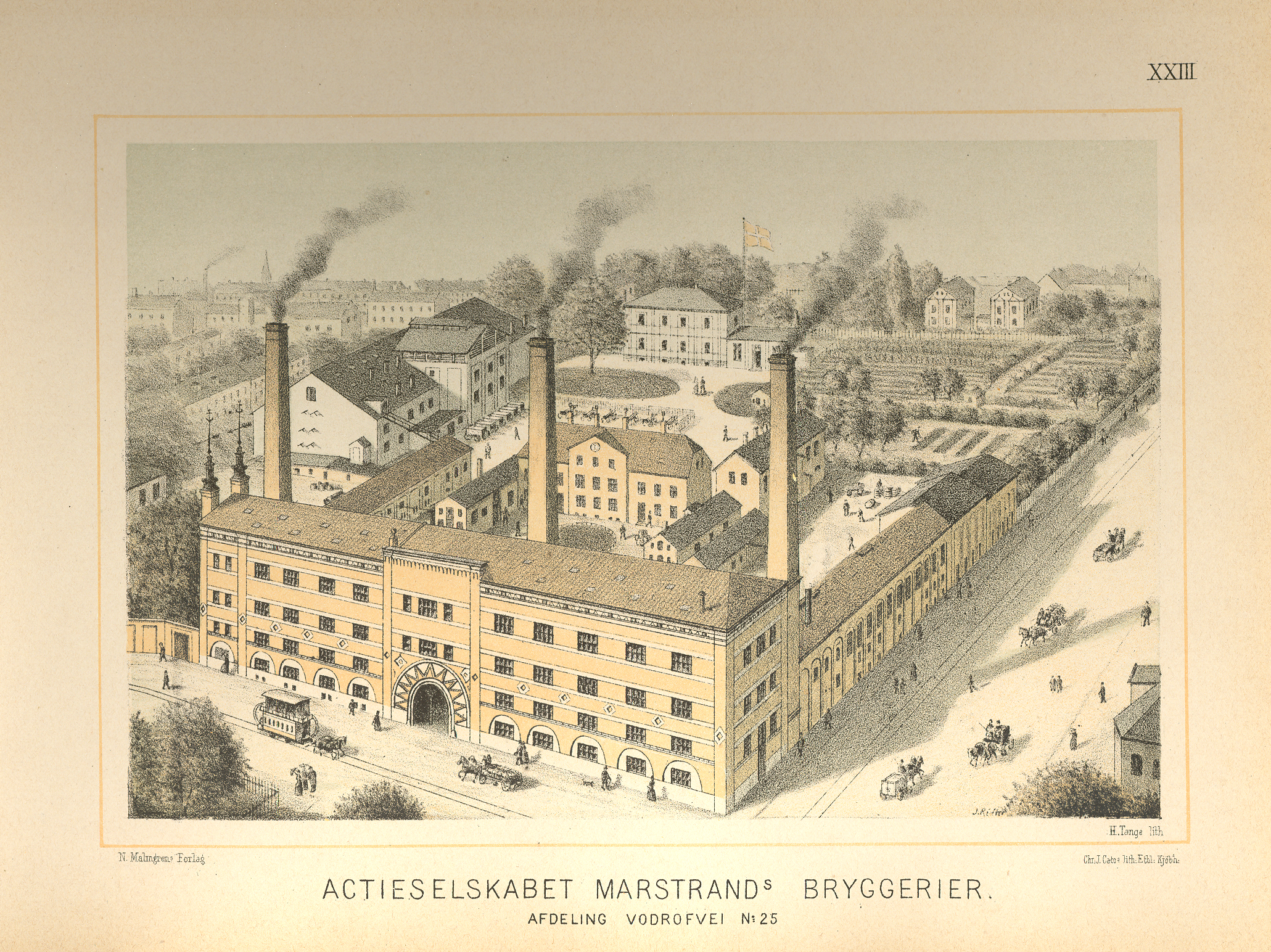
Marstrand's Brewery om c- 1888, illustration by Janus Laurentius Ridter from Danmarks Industrielle Etablissementer

The street was created when the so-called Demarcation Line was moved to the lakes in the 1850s. The brewery Marstrands Bryggeri was established at No. 25 im 1865 and soon developed into one of the largest producers of small beer in the country. It merged with several other breweries under the name De Forenede Bryggerier in 1891. The buildings were demolished in 1976.

== Notable buildings and residents ==
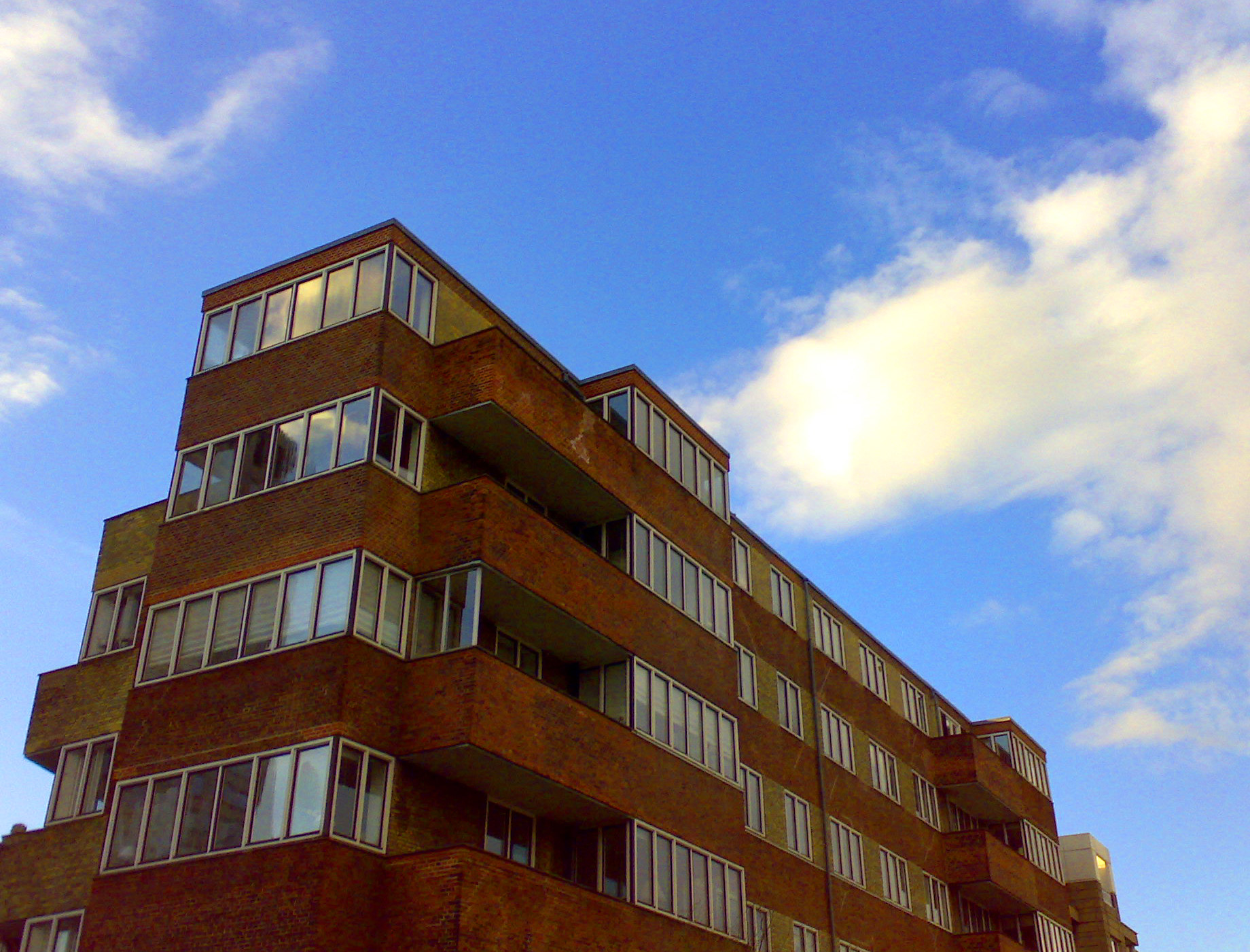
Vodroffsvej 2

The functionalist residential complex at No. 2 was built in 1929 as the first result of a long collaboration between the architects Kay Fisker and C.F. Møller.

The two houses at No. 8 and No. 10 are from 1865 and were both designed by Jacob Wilhelm Frohne . They were listed in 1980 and 1981. The apartment buildings at No. 5, 7 and 9 are from the second half of the 1960s and were designed by Vilhelm Friederichsen.

HORESTA—a trade association and employers' organization for the hotel, restaurant and tourism industry—is based at No. 32. The building at No. 34 was built for Det Kongelige Klasselotteri by Emil Jørgensen in 1897.

The two identical buildings that flank Danasvej (No. 37-39 and No. 41-43) are from 1905 to 1909 and were designed by Ulrik Plesner and Aage Langeland-Mathiesen with decorations by Thorvald Bindesbøll.

The Gotved Institute's building at No. 51 was completed in 1908 to design by Peder Vilhelm Jensen-Klint. It was listed in 1989.

== Cultural references ==
The protagonist Jastrau visits the street in Tom Kristensen's novel Hærværk.
