= Howard Judd =

American medical researcher (1935–2007)

Howard Lund Judd (December 28, 1935 – July 19, 2007) was an American physician and medical researcher. He specialized in obstetrics and gynaecology, and contributed significant research to the field of women's health, in particular about menopause and hormone replacement therapy.

Judd was born in Los Angeles to George and Emmeline Judd. His father was an obstetrician, and his older brother Lewis went on to become chairman of the psychiatry department of University of California, San Diego. Howard went on to study medicine at George Washington University after attending Occidental College and Brigham Young University. Judd completed his residency in obstetrics and gynaecology at Brigham and Women's Hospital, and later trained in endocrinology at Massachusetts General Hospital.

In 1970, he joined the medical faculty at the University of California, San Diego, and later in 1977 joined the University of California, Los Angeles (UCLA). He would remain at the university until his retirement in 2005, and became a professor of obstetrics and gynecology, and the executive director of the division of reproductive endocrinology and infertility.

In his early research, Judd and his collaborators showed that the ovaries of postmenopausal women could secrete amounts of androgen, which can act as precursors to estrogen. He then began investigating the physiology of hot flushes, a characteristic symptom of menopause. He developed techniques to monitor the onset and severity of hot flushes, using electrodes to measure rises in skin temperature due to vasodilation, and pulse rate. These objective measurements of hot flushes later assisted in assessing the effectiveness of treatments mitigating the signs and symptoms of menopause, including hormone replacement therapy. He led the first trials demonstrating the efficacy and safety of the transdermal estrogen patch known as Estraderm.

From the 1990s until 2005 he was a principal researcher for the Women's Health Initiative, a trial investigating important health issues in older women, including menopause and hormone replacement therapy. The trial was halted in 2002 following results showing that women on hormone replacement therapy were at a higher risk of developing cardiovascular disease and breast cancer. Judd maintained that estrogen would in fact benefit some people, a position which researchers eventually adopted after further study.

Howard Judd died of congestive heart failure in his Santa Monica Home, and was survived by his wife Susan Judd and his three daughters.
