= Anda Uldum =

Greenlandic politician

Andreas René Uldum

Leader of the Demokraatit
- In office 30 May 2014 – 2016
- Deputy: Randi Vestergaard Evaldsen
- Preceded by: Jens B. Frederiksen
- Succeeded by: Randi Vestergaard Evaldsen

Member of the Greenlandic Parliament
- In office 2 June 2009 – 2016

Deputy Mayor for Sermersooq municipality
- In office 2 April 2013 – 2014
- Deputy: Martha Abelsen

Chairman of the committee for Children, Family and School for Sermersooq municipality
- In office 2 April 2013 – 2014

Personal details
- Born: Andreas René Uldum; 21 April 1979 (age 47) Qeqertarsuaq, Greenland, Kingdom of Denmark
- Citizenship: Kingdom of Denmark
- Party: Demokraatit (D)
- Spouse: Charlotte Uldum
- Children: 2
- Profession: Social work
- Website: www.demokraatit.gl

Anda Uldum or Andreas René Uldum (born 21 April 1979 in Qeqertarsuaq) is a former Greenlandic politician and a former member of the Inatsisartut. He was the leader of the Greenland party Demokraatit. 2015 he became Minister of Finance and Raw Materials when his party the Democrats entered a coalition with the social democratic Siumut and another centre-right party, Atassut. In 2016, he resigned his post and left politics due to health issues. He later moved to Denmark.

He graduated as a social worker, but is known throughout Greenland for his music career, both in the band DDR and as a soloist. He has released Kids plate Angakkuakkatut at Atlantic Music.

Party political offices
Preceded by Jens B. Frederiksen	Leader of Demokraatit; 2014–present	Incumbent
