= Pär Lund =

Swedish pianist and composer (born 1972)

- Born: 25 September 1972 (age 52); Stockholm, Sweden
- Occupation(s): Classical pianist and composer
- Years active: 1991–present

Pär Lund (born 25 September 1972) is a Swedish pianist and composer.

== Education ==
Lund began composing and playing the piano at the age of 7 and initiated his formal education in 1991 with professor Esther Bodin-Karpe at the Royal College of Music in Stockholm. In 1994 he continued at the Sibelius Academy in Helsinki where he until 2002 studied piano with professor Juhani Lagerspetz and composition with Erkki Jokinen and Olli Kortekangas. Following graduation, Lund concluded his studies at the masterprogram in piano at Stockholm's Royal College of Music 2002–2006 with professor Staffan Scheja. Lund has also participated in masterclasses for Dmitri Bashkirov, Eero Heinonen, Alfons Kontarsky, Radoslav Kvapil, Jacob Lateiner, László Simon, Valerian Vishnevsky and others.

== Career ==
Lund's pianistic career began to show promise in his late teens when he in 1992 won Kil's International Piano Competition, followed by his entrance in the Ennio Porrino International Piano Competition in Cagliari where he reached the finals and was awarded for finest interpretation. He has since given piano recitals in Finland, Germany, France, Spain, Russia, Luxembourg and other countries, and has appeared in both Swedish and Finnish radio and TV - most recently in the Swedish version of Got Talent.

As a composer Lund has drawn attention both in his native country and abroad, not least through his Variations on Sten Carlberg's theme to Bamse (a popular Swedish cartoon character) which led to a special feature in Musikspegeln on Swedish national television in 2003. The work consists of 7 variations and puts formidable demands on the pianist, despite its humorous nature. Among the original compositions special mention can be given to Darum (written as a reply to Robert Schumann's piano piece Warum?) along with its spin-off Xarum, 3^x which mixes a lyrical tonal language with a rigid mathematical subtext, the Scott Joplin inspired (B)ragtime, as well as To the Power Of... - a single-movement work for piano and orchestra which received its premiere on 8 June 2006 at the Stockholm Concert Hall, with the Royal Stockholm Philharmonic Orchestra under Michael Bartosch.

Lund's activities as a composer has also been awarded several scholarships, including STIM's Scholarship for Composers, the Swedish Arts Board's Scholarship for Musicians, and Byggnads Cultural Scholarship presented to him by the then Swedish Prime Minister Göran Persson.
