= Bernhard Lund (sailor) =

Norwegian yacht racer (1889–1968)

Personal information
- Nationality: Norwegian
- Born: 20 February 1889 Darmstadt, German Empire
- Died: 9 January 1968 (aged 78) Oslo, Norway

Sport
- Sport: Sailing

Bernhard Georg Lund (20 February 1889 – 9 January 1968) was a Norwegian yacht racer. He was born in Darmstadt, Germany. and represented the Royal Norwegian Yacht Club. He competed at the 1928 Summer Olympics in Amsterdam, where he placed fourth in the 8-meter class. He died in Oslo in 1968.
