= Bernhard Lund (footballer) =

Norwegian footballer (1910–1969)

Personal information
- Full name: Bernhard Oliver Lund
- Date of birth: 16 April 1910
- Place of birth: Oslo, Norway
- Date of death: 27 June 1969 (aged 59)
- Position: Midfielder

Senior career*
Years	Team	Apps	(Gls)
- Viking

International career
1933–1934	Norway	3	(0)
- * Club domestic league appearances and goals

Bernhard Oliver Lund (16 April 1910 – 27 June 1969) was a Norwegian footballer who played as a midfielder for Viking. He made three appearances for the Norway national team, once in 1933 and twice in 1934.
