= Carl Lund (industrialist) =

Danish industrialist (1846–1912)

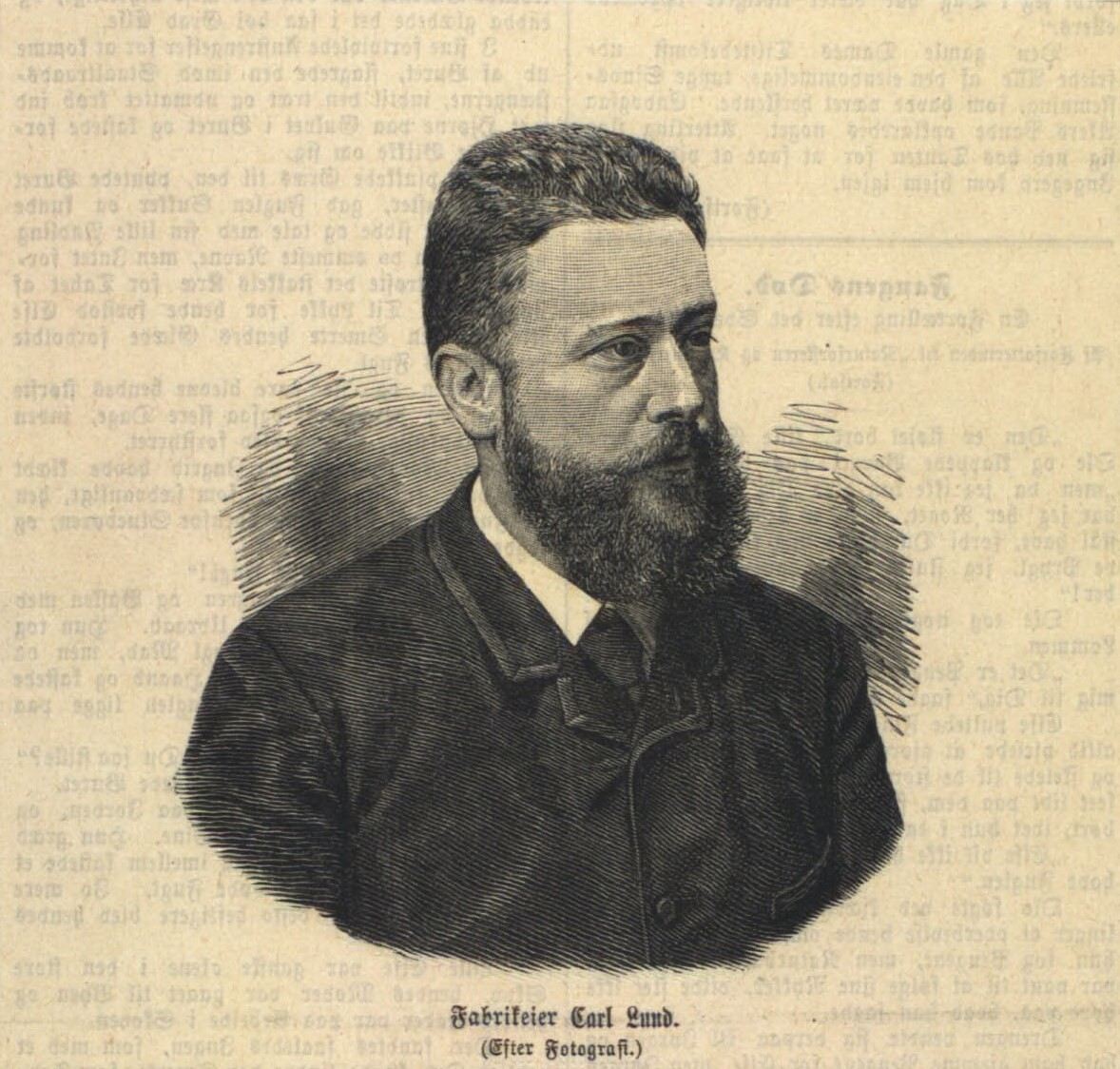
- Born: 8 April 1846; Copenhagen, Denmark
- Died: 17 October 1912 (aged 66); Malmö, Sweden
- Occupation: Industrialist
- Awards: Knight in the Order of the Dannebrog, 1904

Carl Lund (8 April 1846 – 17 October 1912) was a Danish industrialist. He was the founder of Carl Lunds Fabrikker. Carl Lunds Vej on Amager in Copenhagen is named after him.

== Early life and education ==
Lund was born on 6 April 1846 in Copenhagen, the son of master shoemaker Carl Lund (c. 1809-1845) and Anne Christine Jensen (1811-1882). His father died before he was born. His mother was married a second time to master shoemaker Jens Falslev (1817-1877) in 1847. Lund attended Melchiors Borgerskole before apprenticing as an ironmonger.

== Career ==
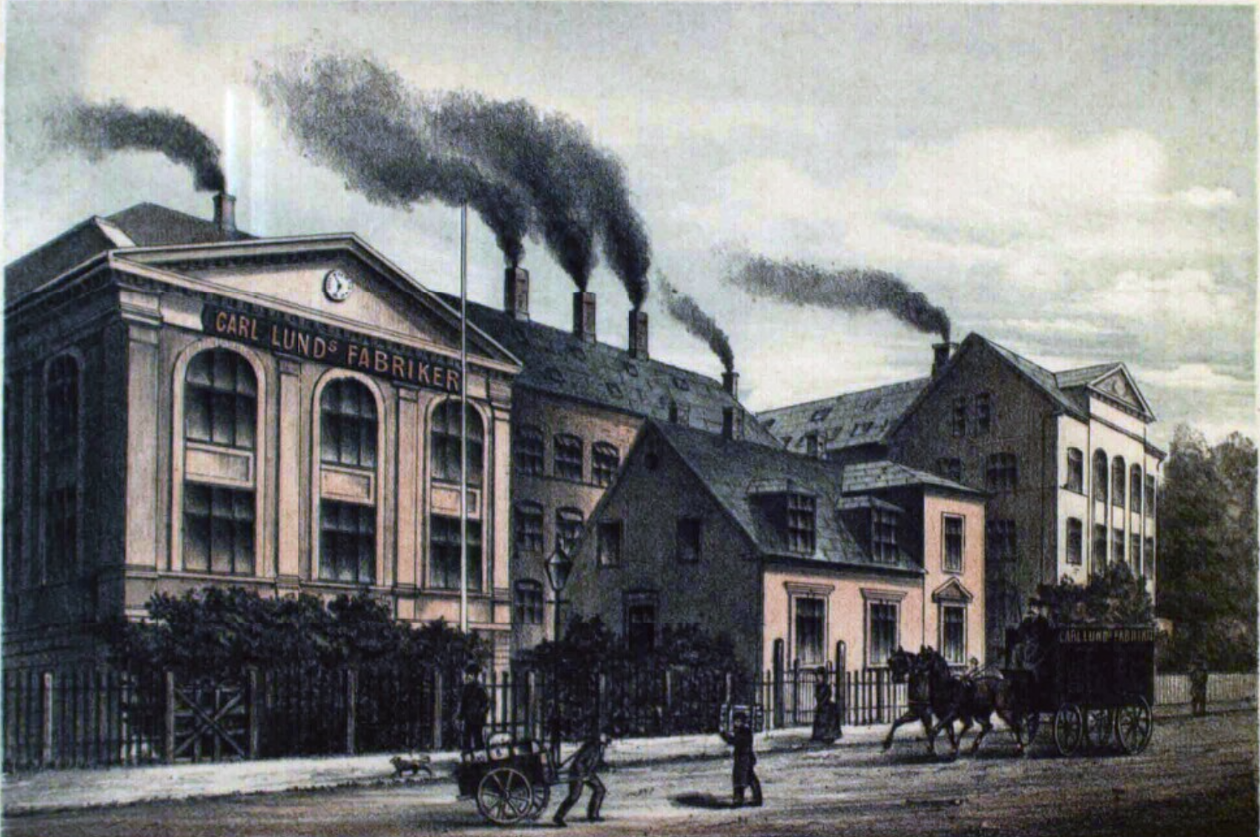
Carl Lunds Fabrikker

Lund in 1872 became the co-owner of a small factory which produced lacquered sheet metal products. P. C. Elfstrøm, who would later become the managing director of the Raadvaddam Factory north of Copenhagen, had founded the factory in 1859. A new factory had just been inaugurated at Bernstorffsvej (now Danasvej) in Frederiksberg. In 1874, Lund became the sole owner of the company. The company grew rapidly under his management and the product range was expanded to all types of lacquered, tin plated and enamelware products. The company obtained a dominant position on the Danish market, also meeting with success in the Norwegian and Swedish markets after established a subsidiary in Malmö in 1879. He constructed a factory, which in circa 1889 was converted into a limited company. Lund retired in 1896 from the position as CEO to become a board member.

== Personal life and legacy ==
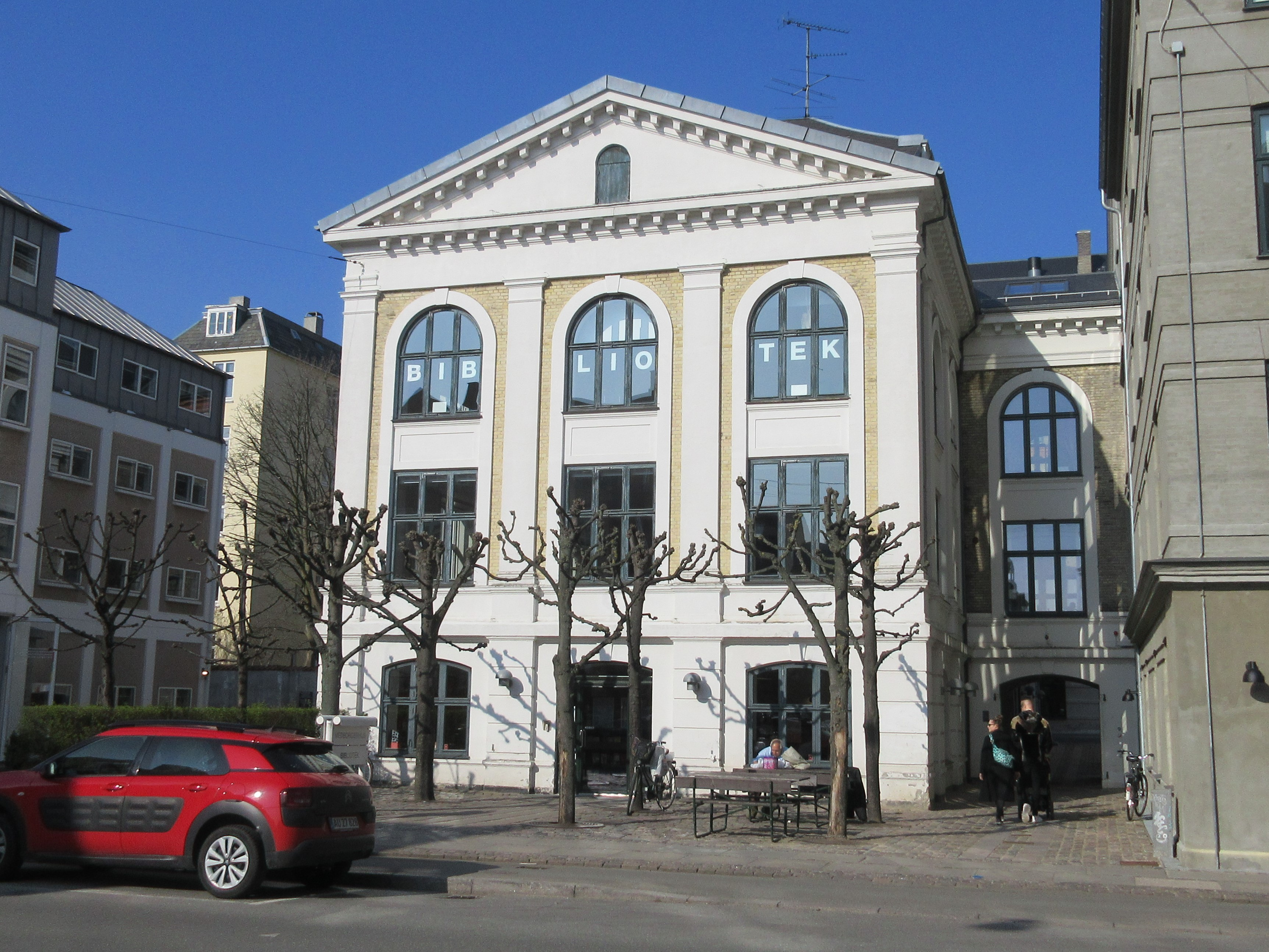
Danasvej Library

Lund married Hulda Francisca Lassen (3 June 1848 - 9 March 1933) on 4 September 1872 in Copenhagen. Sje was a daughter of master shoemaker Hans Lassen (1817-1890) and Cathrine Knap (1823–82). Lund was Peruvian consul from 1887.

In late 1911, increasing health problems forced Lund to give up his position as a board member. He continued to oversee the factory in Malmö where he died the following year. Carl Lunds Fabrikker relocated to a large new factory complex on Amager in 1915. Carl Lunds Fabrikker went under reconstruction in 1921 after its engagement in Akts. International Emaille-Industri had resulted in a considerable loss. In 1029, Carl Lunds Babrikker entered into a close partnership with Glud & Marstrand. Glud & Marstrand acquired the company in 1932.

Carl Lunds Fabrikker's former head office at Danasvej 30 is now home to a branch of Frederiksberg Library. The factory in Amager has been demolished, although a street at the site has been named Carl Lunds Cej after Lund.
