= Peter Christian Lund =

Danish physician (1814–1891)

Peter Christian Lund (25 October 1814 – 3 November 1891) was a Danish physician and early pioneer in the study of disease transmission between humans and animals in tuberculosis. He was the last doctor at the Samsø Quarantine Station on Kyholm from August 1853 to April 1855. Its purpose was to protect Denmark against cholera. All ships suspected of having cholera had to remain at the quarantine station for 10 days, until Lund had approved the ship's crew.

Lund was the son of cooper master Rasmus Jessen Lund and became a student from the Metropolitanskolen in 1833, passing his medical exam (Lægeeksamen) in1841 (candid.med. et chir.). He went to Marstal in 1842, became chief ship's doctor in 1846 and settled on Samsø in 1853.

== Tuberculosis study ==
It was not until the 1880s that it became clear that tuberculosis was an infectious disease, but exactly how it was transmitted was not known, and it was a long time before it was understood that the disease could be transmitted between humans and animals, for example with infected cow's milk. But as early as 1865, Lund had investigated the possibility of infection between animals and humans, when he systematically gave his youngest son milk from a cow with tuberculosis. In 1879, his experiment was described in the medical journal "Nordiskt Medicinskt Arkiv" vol. 11.

"The milk was taken from a wretched, meagre cow, continually coughing and suffering from inflammation of the lungs. The subject of the experiment was Dr. Lund's youngest son, a healthy, well-made boy. The baby was fed with milk from the said cow from February, 1865, to November of the same year; and from November, 1865, to August, 1867, the child was fed with the milk of another similar cow.' The result of the experiment is described as follows: — 'When eight months old, scrofulous conjunctivitis appeared in the child, which still continued when Dr. Lund wrote his report. In Dr. Lund's opinion the disease could only be rationally accounted for by reference to the diseased milk."

The discovery was reproduced in the journal "Zoophilist" (April, 1884, p. 284.)

Carrying out medical experiments on animals and one's own children was very controversial at the time, and Lund's experiment with his newborn boy was included in a major international hearing in 1903 on whether vivisection - experiments on live animals - should be allowed.

After the experiment was published, Lund argued that Denmark's entire cattle population should be examined for tuberculosis, and upon his death the journal "Library for Doctors" wrote in 1892:

"Lund thereby showed at an early time, which incidentally coincided with Willemuis and other experiments with tuberculin inoculation on animals, to have an understanding of the importance that bovine tuberculosis can have for the spread of the disease in the population, and proposed a general examination of the country's cattle population for tuberculosis . Also in other respects he was a man with original views and a greater overview than most".

Lund was married. His children emigrated to the United States. His daughter, en route to visit her father, was lost in the 1888 collision of the S/S Geiser and the S/S Thingvalla, both ships of the Thingvalla Line. The Samsø newspaper wrote after his death:

"Lund was a very peculiar man, extremely gifted, knowledgeable and well-read. As he liked to express his often very own and special opinions, views and judgments unreservedly and in a sharp, sometimes bitter and ironic form, he often offended, but behind the seemingly hard shell and despite the often sharp and bitter words, a warm heart beat in him."
