= Ragne Birte Lund =

Norwegian civil servant and diplomat (born 1949)

Ragne Birte Lund (born 20 November 1949) is a Norwegian civil servant and diplomat.

She holds the cand.philol. degree and was hired in the Ministry of Foreign Affairs in 1977. She was Norway's ambassador to South Korea from 1995 to 1997, to Thailand from 2000 to 2005 and to Bangladesh from 2010 to 2013. For three periods; 1997–2000, 2005–2010 and 2013–2016 she was a special adviser in the Ministry of Foreign Affairs.
