= Carl Lund (painter) =

Danish theatrical painter (1855–1940)

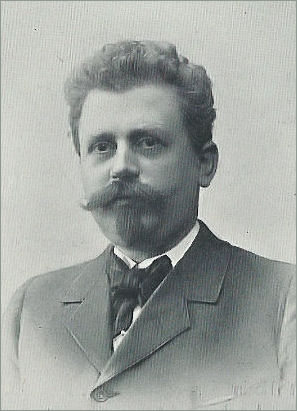
Carl Lund

Carl Christian Lund (21 April 1855 – 10 February 1940) was the leading Danish theatrical painter of his time.

== Early life and education ==
Lund was born on 21 April 1855 in Odense, the son of master shoemaker Niels Martin Lund (1819-72) og Abelone Aagaard (1824-90). He apprenticed as a house painter and attended Odense Technical School. In 1873-76, he attended the Royal Danish Academy of Fine Arts. He then started to work as an assistant in his uncle Carl Frederik Aagaard's studio before going on a study trip to Munich, Vienna and Italy.

== Career ==
In Vienna, Lund had begun specializing in theatrical painting. He had his debut as a scenographer at the opening of Dagmarteatret on 7 March 1883. He started working for the Casino Theatre the following year.

Lund soon gained recognition for his technical skill and was in 1889 selected for decorating the Danish pavilion at the Exposition Universelle (1889) in Paris. He created six large paintings of Danish castles which were awarded the exhibition's silver medal. In 1892, he returned to Italy on a travel stipend from the Ministry of Culture. In 1896 he was appointed as acting theatrical painter at the Royal Danish Theatre. He also worked for most of the other theatres in Copenhagen as well as in the provinces.

== Personal life ==
Lund met his future wife Leopoldine Franziska Schafrath (9 March 1859 – 9 March 1926) in Vienna. They were married on 11 January 1883 in Odense. The couple lived in Frederiksberg. He was created a Knight in the Order of the Dannebrog in 1915.

Lund died on 10 February 1940 and is buried in Frederiksberg Old Cemetery.
