= Queensland Clarion Awards =

The Queensland Clarion Awards (known informally as the Clarions) are annual awards for journalists in the state of Queensland, Australia. The awards started in 1995, and in May 2010 were re-branded from the Queensland Media Awards. They are administered by the Media Entertainment and Arts Alliance (MEAA). The awards are state-based and are usually announced in the Australian spring, ahead of the annual Walkley Awards.

== Name ==
The Clarion name was chosen to reflect the history of the Australian Journalists Association, one of the founding sections of the MEAA, the union representing Australian journalists, photographers, graphic artists, camera people, other media workers, musicians, actors and theatrical workers. The Clarion newspaper was an occasional paper published by the AJA during strikes.

== Entry ==
Entry to the annual awards is open to all journalists, photographers, camera people, producers and artists in print, radio, television and online. The entry fee (A$230 in 2010) is waived for all members of the Alliance.
