= Language Secretariat of Greenland =

Language Authority of Greenland

The Language Secretariat of Greenland Oqaasileriffik
- Formation: 1998
- Location: Nuuk, Greenland
- Head of Secretariat: Beatrine Heilmann
- Parent organization: Naalakkersuisut
- Website: oqaasileriffik.gl/en/

The Language Secretariat of Greenland (Oqaasileriffik; lit. 'place where one deals with words', Danish: Grønlands Sprogsekretariat;) is the official language authority of Greenland in charge of regulating the Greenlandic language. The organization was founded in 1998 with only one member. Now the organization has 12 members and 7 student assistants.

The tasks of Oqaasileriffik is to research the Greenlandic language including its dialects, set the orthography, approve foreign and new words, publish terminology lists and reports informing language policy, and to provide information, advice and recommendation on Greenlandic.

== History ==
Oqaasileriffik was established in 1998. The establishment was the result of a decision by the Parliament of Greenland made on the basis of earlier inquiries, and in the context of the Greenlandic language as an identity symbol.

In 2007, Oqaasileriffik was contacted for comments on language 370 times. In 2011, it was contacted around 600 times.

Lenore Grenoble and Jerry Sadock collaborated with Oqaasileriffik on a project on the development of a Greenlandic-English dictionary, in a project funded by the US National Science Foundation 2011-2013.

In 2018, Oqaasileriffik published a website with 33000 official place names of Greenland.

In 2021, Beatrine Heilmann became the leader of Oqaasileriffik, succeeding Katti Frederiksen.

Oqaasileriffik collaborated with Sipineq+, a Greenlandic LGBTQIA+ organization on the development of Greenlandic terms with a focus on the area of gender identities.

== Organization ==
Oqaasileriffik is split into 4 different research areas. The categories are Personal Names, Geographical Place Names, Authority Duties, and Language Technology. The Personal Names section of Oqaasileriffik was created in 2016 and works with the Danish Names Act to approve Greenlandic names. The Geographical Names Committee is part of the organization is responsible for naming geographical features in Greenland. Committee members serve a 4-year term. Oqaaserpassualeriffik (literally ‘Place where one deals with lots of words’) is a section of Oqaasileriffik that contains dictionaries and other tools to assist in the translation of Greenlandic. Oqaaserpassualeriffik has created several technologies to translate and use Greenlandic, including Marta, a Text to Speech engine, and kukkuniiaat, a spell checker. They aim to offer a more complete suite of tools including automatic translation.

The organization also includes Oqaasiliortut (The Language Council), which is responsible for collecting, registering and approving new Greenlandic words. Members are appointed to the council by the Greenlandic Government and serve a 4 year term. Oqaasiliortut consists of 5 members. They are nominated by the Public and National Library of Greenland, Greenland's Author Organization, the union for journalists and the organization for interpreters and translators.

Oqaasileriffik participates in the Inuit Circumpolar Council and the Inuit Studies Conference.
