= Inuit grammar =

Grammar of the Inuit languages

The Inuit languages, like other Eskimo–Aleut languages, exhibit a regular agglutinative and heavily suffixing morphology. The languages are rich in suffixes, making words very long and potentially unique. For example, in Nunavut Inuktitut:

ᑐᓵᑦᓯᐊᕈᓐᓇᖖᒋᑦᑐᐊᓘᔪᖓ
tusaatsiarunnanngittualuujunga
I can't hear very well.

This long word is composed of a root word tusaa- – to hear – followed by seven suffixes (a vowel-beginning suffix always erases the final consonant of the preceding consonant-ending suffix):

- -tsiaq-: "well"
- -junnaq- (or -gunnaq-): "be able to"
- -nngit-: negation
- -tu(q): indicative third-person singular (in fact a nominal form)
- -alu(k)-: augmentative ("very")
- -u-: "be"
- -junga: indicative first-person singular (itself composed of the indicative morpheme -ju- and the first person marker -nga)

Note the consonant sandhi (see Inuit phonology): The /q/ from -tsiaq- followed by the /j/ from -junnaq- becomes ‹r› [ʁ], a single consonant taking its point of articulation from /q/ and its manner of articulation from /j/. The /q/ from -junnaq- is assimilated into the /ŋŋ/ of -nngit-, because Inuktitut forbids triple length consonants, and because the morphophonological rules attached to -nngit- require it to delete any consonant that comes before it.

This sort of word construction is pervasive in Inuit languages and makes it very unlike English. In one large Inuktitut corpus – the Nunavut Hansard – 92% of all words appear only once, in contrast to a small percentage in most English corpora of similar size. This makes the application of Zipf's law quite difficult.

Furthermore, the notion of a part of speech can be somewhat complicated in Inuit languages. Fully inflected verbs can be interpreted as nouns. The word ilisaijuq can be interpreted as a fully inflected verb – "he studies" – but can also be interpreted as a noun: "student".

Because of the languages’ rich and complicated morphology, this article can present only a limited and unsystematic sample of its features. It is based largely on the Inuktitut dialects of north Baffin Island and central Nunavut. The morphology and syntax of Inuit language varies to some degree between dialects, but the basic principles will generally apply to all of them and to some degree to Yupik as well.

== Nouns ==
Nouns (atiqausit) are the parts of speech that describe people, places, and things. Nouns are marked for number, case, and possession.

=== Noun declension ===
Inuktut has three numbers; singular, dual, and plural.

Inuktut has eight noun cases, all of which display various roles within the sentence.

The following is the declension of the noun ᐃᒡᓗ (iglu, house)

	Singular	Dual	Plural
Nominative	iglu	igluuk	iglut
Ergative	igluup	igluuk	iglut
Accusative	iglumik	iglungnik	iglunik
Locative	iglumi	iglungni	igluni
Ablative	iglumit	iglungnit	iglunit
Allative	iglumut	iglungnut	iglunut
Prolative	iglukkut	igluukkut	iglutigut
Equative	iglutut	iglutitut	

Inuktitut uses a split-ergative structure, marking the subject of a non-specific verb and the object of a specific verb in the same way – the absence of a specific morphological marker – and marks the subject of a specific verb and the object of a non-specific verb with particular morphological elements. This kind of morphosyntactic structure is often called an ergative structure. However, ergativity in its most clearly defined instances is primarily about transitive and intransitive verbs. This dichotomy is not identical to the specific/non-specific verb distinction in Inuktitut, since Inuktitut usage is also concerned with the definiteness of the objects of verb.

Consequently, the application of the notion of ergativity to Inuktitut, and to many other languages, is somewhat controversial. Regardless, by analogy with more conventionally ergative languages, the -up, -k, -it endings described above are often called ergative suffixes which are taken to be indicative of the ergative case, while the -mik, -rnik, -nik endings (see Non-specific verbs – Objects) are called accusative. This usage is often seen in linguistics literature describing Inuktitut, and sometimes in pedagogic literature and dictionaries, but remains a quite foreign vocabulary to most Inuit.

The Inuktitut language also uses the ergative and the accusative cases in different forms: the ergative also appears as a genitive, marking the possessor of a noun. This ergative-genitive case is required to be used for the relation between two nouns. However, it is identical to the nominative in the dual and plural.

The locative cases (locative, ablative, allative, and prolative) correspond roughly to the English prepositions in/on, from, to, and through/by. The equative case is most similar to the preposition like/as; hence the language name of Inuktitut, "like the people."

== Verbs in main clauses ==
Inuktitut verbs fall into two major categories with different morphological properties: non-specific verbs and specific verbs. Many verbs belong in both categories, and can take either set of endings depending on the type of information about the verb's arguments that speakers intend to communicate. Others are restricted to one category or require a morphological change in order to move between categories.

Every fully inflected Inuktitut verb can act alone as a proposition. No other words are required to form a syntactically correct sentence.

This section will only cover two of the most common sets of endings for these two verb classes and a small selection of verbal modifiers. Inuktitut has a large and diverse set of verbal inflections, of which this article can only cover a small portion designed to give some sense of how the Inuktitut language works.

=== Non-specific verbs ===
Non-specific verbs are verbs that either are intransitive (they have no direct object), or have an indefinite noun as their object. In English, an indefinite noun is marked by the lack of the article the or, if the noun is singular (and countable) the article a(n). In Inuktitut, when it is the object of a verb, it is distinguished by the use of a non-specific verb and particular suffix described below. A definite noun, in contrast, requires the use of a specific verb when it is the object of a verb.

==== Non-specific indicative conjugation ====
As a general rule, a correctly formed Inuktitut verb must start with a root and end with a suffix that indicates the grammatical person of its subject:

ᖁᕕᐊᓱᒃ ᑐᖓ
quviasuk- -tunga
{to be happy} 1SG
I am happy

ᐊᓂ ᔪᖅ
ani- -juq
{to go out} 3SG
he/she/it has just now gone out.

The indicative is the simplest form of the verb in Inuktitut, and for state verbs – verbs indicating a condition or a situation – this form indicates the present tense: The condition or situation is presently the case. For action verbs, it indicates that the action has recently been completed, mixing tense and aspect. Inuktitut verbs are divided into state verbs and action verbs. However, the distinction may not match how non-Inuktitut speakers would categorise verbs. For example, the verb root pisuk-, meaning "to be walking" – is a state verb in Inuktitut.

pisuktunga – I am walking. (right now)

When the verb root ends in a consonant, the suffixes that indicate the grammatical person all begin with t. For example, pisuk- – to be walking – is conjugated as follows:

	Singular	Dual	Plural
1st person	ᐱᓱᒃᑐᖓ pisuktunga I am walking	ᐱᓱᒃᑐᒍᒃ pisuktuguk we [two] are walking	ᐱᓱᒃᑐᒍᑦ pisuktugut we [more than two] are walking
2nd person	ᐱᓱᒃᑐᑎᑦ pisuktutit you [sing] are walking	ᐱᓱᒃᑐᓯᒃ pisuktusik you [two] are walking	ᐱᓱᒃᑐᓯ pisuktusi you [more than two] are walking
3rd person	ᐱᓱᒃᑐᖅ pisuktuq he/she/it is walking	ᐱᓱᒃᑑᒃ pisuktuuk they [two] are walking	ᐱᓱᒃᑐᑦ pisuktut they [more than two] are walking

Verb roots that end in a vowel have suffixes that start with a j. For example, ani- – to go out:

	Singular	Dual	Plural
1st person	ᐊᓂᔪᖓ anijunga I have just gone out	ᐊᓂᔪᒍᒃ anijuguk we [two] have just gone out	ᐊᓂᔪᒍᑦ anijugut we [more than two] have just gone out
2nd person	ᐊᓂᔪᑎᑦ anijutit you [sing] have just gone out	ᐊᓂᔪᓯᒃ anijusik you [two] have just gone out	ᐊᓂᔪᓯ anijusi you [more than two] have just gone out
3rd person	ᐊᓂᔪᖅ anijuq he/she/it has just gone out	ᐊᓂᔫᒃ anijuuk they [two] have just gone out	ᐊᓂᔪᑦ anijut they [more than two] have just gone out

Note that Inuktitut has a fully productive dual number, present in all three persons.

Verb roots ending in a consonant
	Singular	Dual	Plural
1st person	ᑐᖓ -tunga	ᑐᒍᒃ -tuguk	ᑐᒍᑦ -tugut
2nd person	ᑐᑎᑦ -tutit	ᑐᓯᒃ -tusik	ᑐᓯ -tusi
3rd person	ᑐᖅ -tuq	ᑑᒃ -tuuk	ᑐᑦ -tut

Verb roots ending in a vowel
	Singular	Dual	Plural
1st person	ᔪᖓ -junga	ᔪᒍᒃ -juguk	ᔪᒍᑦ -jugut
2nd person	ᔪᑎᑦ -jutit	ᔪᓯᒃ -jusik	ᔪᓯ -jusi
3rd person	ᔪᖅ -juq	ᔫᒃ -juuk	ᔪᑦ -jut

==== Alternative form ====
There is an alternative form of the above conjugation which is used in different ways and to different degrees depending on dialect. Instead of starting with t after a consonant and j after a vowel, this form starts with p after a consonant and v after a vowel. The exact difference varies from dialect to dialect. In western dialects, including Inuinnaqtun and Inupiatun, only the t/j forms are ever used for statements and the p/v form is rarely if ever heard. In Greenland, only the p/v form is used. In the central and eastern Canadian dialects, both forms are used.

Verb roots ending in a consonant
	Singular	Dual	Plural
1st person	ᐳᖓ -punga	ᐳᒍᒃ -puguk	ᐳᒍᑦ -pugut
2nd person	ᐳᑎᑦ -putit	ᐳᓯᒃ -pusik	ᐳᓯ -pusi
3rd person	ᐳᖅ -puq	ᐴᒃ -puuk	ᐳᑦ -put

Verb roots ending in a vowel
	Singular	Dual	Plural
1st person	ᕗᖓ -vunga	ᕗᒍᒃ -vuguk	ᕗᒍᑦ -vugut
2nd person	ᕗᑎᑦ -vutit	ᕗᓯᒃ -vusik	ᕗᓯ -vusi
3rd person	ᕗᖅ -vuq	ᕘᒃ -vuuk	ᕗᑦ -vut

==== Interrogatives ====
There are additional p/v forms used in Nunavut to indicate interrogative statements – asking questions – although they may indicate other subtle distinctions of aspect. When they are used to ask questions, the last vowel may be doubled to indirectly indicate rising pitch. So, the question "Are we there yet?" can be written as Tikippita? (tikip- – to arrive, and for -pita see the table below) but may also be written as Tikippitaa?

Verb roots ending in a consonant
	Singular	Dual	Plural
1st person	ᐳᖓ -punga	ᐱᓄᒃ -pinuk	ᐱᑕ -pita
2nd person	ᐱᑦ -pit	ᐱᓯᒃ -pisik	ᐱᓯ -pisi
3rd person	ᐸ -pa	ᐸᒃ -pak	ᐸᑦ -pat

Verb roots ending in a vowel
	Singular	Dual	Plural
1st person	ᕗᖓ -vunga	ᕕᓄᒃ -vinuk	ᕕᑕ -vita
2nd person	ᕕᑦ -vit	ᕕᓯᒃ -visik	ᕕᓯ -visi
3rd person	ᕙ -va	ᕙᒃ -vak	ᕙᑦ -vat

This way, one can very compactly pose and answer simple yes/no questions:

ᖁᕕᐊᓱᒃᐱᑦ?
Quviasukpit? (Note: Alternatively, ᖁᕕᐊᓱᒃᐲᑦ? Quviasukpiit?)
Are you happy?

ᐄ, ᖁᕕᐊᓱᒃᑐᖓ.
Ii, quviasuktunga.
Yes, I'm happy.

==== Subjects ====
The subject of a non-specific verb has no special morphological mark:

ᐲᑕ ᐊᓂᔪᖅ.
Piita anijuq.
Peter just went out.

ᓗᐃ ᖁᕕᐊᓱᒃᑐᖅ.
Lui quviasuktuq.
Louis is happy.

==== Objects ====
The object of a non-specific verb must end in a suffix that indicates its syntactic role:

ᐲᑕᒥᒃ ᑕᑯᕕᑦ?
Piitamik takuvit?
Do you see Peter?

The object of a non-specific verb takes one of the suffixes below, depending on its number:

Indefinite suffixes
Singular	ᒥᒃ -mik	/m/ nasalises a preceding consonant
Dual	ᕐᓂᒃ -rnik	deletes any preceding consonant and doubles the length of the preceding vowel
Plural	ᓂᒃ -nik	/n/ nasalises a preceding consonant

An example using the verb taku- – to see – and inuviniq – dead person:

Singular:	ᐃᓄᕕᓂᕐᒥᒃ ᑕᑯᔪᖓ. Inuvinirmik takujunga. I see a dead person.
Dual:	ᐃᓄᕕᓃᕐᓂᒃ ᑕᑯᔪᖓ. Inuviniirnik takujunga. I see two dead people.
Plural:	ᐃᓄᕕᓂᕐᓂᒃ ᑕᑯᔪᖓ. Inuvinirnik takujunga. I see dead people.

To say "I see the dead person" or "I see the dead people" requires a specific verb, which is described in the section below.

=== Specific verbs ===
Specific verbs – verbs whose objects are definite as opposed to indefinite – take suffixes that indicate the grammatical person and number of both the subject and the object.

==== Specific indicative conjugation ====
Specific verb suffixes used after vowels:
		Subject								
		1st sg.	2nd sg.	3rd sg.	1st du.	2nd du.	3rd du.	1st pl.	2nd pl.	3rd pl.
Object	1st sg.		ᔭᙵ -jannga	ᔮᖓ -jaanga		ᔭᔅᓯᙵ -jassinnga	ᔮᖓ -jaanga		ᔭᔅᓯᙵ -jassinnga	ᔮᖓ -jaanga
Object	2nd sg.	ᔭᒋᑦ -jagit		ᔮᑎᑦ -jaatit	ᔭᑦᑎᒋᑦ -jattigit		ᔮᑎᑦ -jaatit	ᔭᑦᑎᒋᑦ -jattigit		ᔮᑎᑦ -jaatit
Object	3rd sg.	ᔭᕋ -jara	ᔭᐃᑦ -jait	ᔭᖓ -janga	ᔭᕗᒃ -javuk	ᔭᓯᒃ -jasik	ᔭᖓᒃ -jangak	ᔭᕗᑦ -javut	ᔭᓯ -jasi	ᔭᖓᑦ -jangat
Object	1st du.		ᔭᑦᑎᒍᒃ -jattiguk	ᔮᑎᒍᒃ -jaatiguk		ᔭᑦᑎᒍᒃ -jattiguk	ᔮᑎᒍᒃ -jaatiguk		ᔭᑦᑎᒍᒃ -jattiguk	ᔮᑎᒍᒃ -jaatiguk
Object	2nd du.	ᔭᔅᓯᒃ -jassik		ᔮᓯᒃ -jaasik	ᔭᔅᓯᒃ -jassik		ᔮᓯᒃ -jaasik	ᔭᔅᓯᒃ -jassik		ᔮᓯᒃ -jaasik
Object	3rd du.	ᔮᒃᑲᒃ -jaakkak	ᔮᒃᑭᒃ -jaakkik	ᔭᖏᒃ -jangik	ᔭᕗᒃ -javuk	ᔭᓯᒃ -jasik	ᔭᖏᒃ -jangik	ᔭᕗᒃ -javuk	ᔭᓯᒃ -jasik	ᔭᖏᒃ -jangik
Object	1st pl.		ᔭᑦᑎᒍᑦ -jattigut	ᔮᑎᒍᑦ -jaatigut		ᔭᑦᑎᒍᑦ -jattigut	ᔮᑎᒍᑦ -jaatigut		ᔭᑦᑎᒍᑦ -jattigut	ᔮᑎᒍᑦ -jaatigut
Object	2nd pl.	ᔭᔅᓯ -jassi		ᔮᓯ -jaasi	ᔭᔅᓯ -jassi		ᔮᓯ -jaasi	ᔭᔅᓯ -jassi		ᔮᓯ -jaasi
Object	3rd pl.	ᔭᒃᑲ -jakka	ᔭᑎᑦ -jatit	ᔭᖏᑦ -jangit	ᔭᕗᑦ -javut	ᔭᓯ -jasi	ᔭᖏᑦ -jangit	ᔭᕗᑦ -javut	ᔭᓯ -jasi	ᔭᖏᑦ -jangit

Specific verb suffixes used after consonants:
		Subject								
		1st sg.	2nd sg.	3rd sg.	1st du.	2nd du.	3rd du.	1st pl.	2nd pl.	3rd pl.
Object	1st sg.		ᑕᙵ -tannga	ᑖᖓ -taanga		ᑕᔅᓯᙵ -tassinnga	ᑖᖓ -taanga		ᑕᔅᓯᙵ -tassinnga	ᑖᖓ -taanga
Object	2nd sg.	ᑕᒋᑦ -tagit		ᑖᑎᑦ -taatit	ᑕᑦᑎᒋᑦ -tattigit		ᑖᑎᑦ -taatit	ᑕᑦᑎᒋᑦ -tattigit		ᑖᑎᑦ -taatit
Object	3rd sg.	ᑕᕋ -tara	ᑕᐃᑦ -tait	ᑕᖓ -tanga	ᑕᕗᒃ -tavuk	ᑕᓯᒃ -tasik	ᑕᖓᒃ -tangak	ᑕᕗᑦ -tavut	ᑕᓯ -tasi	ᑕᖓᑦ -tangat
Object	1st du.		ᑕᑦᑎᒍᒃ -tattiguk	ᑖᑎᒍᒃ -taatiguk		ᑕᑦᑎᒍᒃ -tattiguk	ᑖᑎᒍᒃ -taatiguk		ᑕᑦᑎᒍᒃ -tattiguk	ᑖᑎᒍᒃ -taatiguk
Object	2nd du.	ᑕᔅᓯᒃ -tassik		ᑖᓯᒃ -taasik	ᑕᔅᓯᒃ -tassik		ᑖᓯᒃ -taasik	ᑕᔅᓯᒃ -tassik		ᑖᓯᒃ -taasik
Object	3rd du.	ᑖᒃᑲᒃ -taakkak	ᑖᒃᑭᒃ -taakkik	ᑕᖏᒃ -tangik	ᑕᕗᒃ -tavuk	ᑕᓯᒃ -tasik	ᑕᖏᒃ -tangik	ᑕᕗᒃ -tavuk	ᑕᓯᒃ -tasik	ᑕᖏᒃ -tangik
Object	1st pl.		ᑕᑦᑎᒍᑦ -tattigut	ᑖᑎᒍᑦ -taatigut		ᑕᑦᑎᒍᑦ -tattigut	ᑖᑎᒍᑦ -taatigut		ᑕᑦᑎᒍᑦ -tattigut	ᑖᑎᒍᑦ -taatigut
Object	2nd pl.	ᑕᔅᓯ -tassi		ᑖᓯ -taasi	ᑕᔅᓯ -tassi		ᑖᓯ -taasi	ᑕᔅᓯ -tassi		ᑖᓯ -taasi
Object	3rd pl.	ᑕᒃᑲ -takka	ᑕᑎᑦ -tatit	ᑕᖏᑦ -tangit	ᑕᕗᑦ -tavut	ᑕᓯ -tasi	ᑕᖏᑦ -tangit	ᑕᕗᑦ -tavut	ᑕᓯ -tasi	ᑕᖏᑦ -tangit

Note that the suffixes in this table cannot be used for reflexive verbs. That will be discussed separately.

==== Alternative form ====
As with non-specific verbs, specific verbs have an alternate v/p form used to the exclusion of j/t forms in Greenland, to some extent interchangeably in Nunavut, and not at all in the west:

Specific verb suffixes used after vowels:
		Subject								
		1st sg.	2nd sg.	3rd sg.	1st du.	2nd du.	3rd du.	1st pl.	2nd pl.	3rd pl.
Object	1st sg.		ᕙᙵ -vannga	ᕚᖓ -vaanga		ᕙᔅᓯᙵ -vassinnga	ᕚᖓ -vaanga		ᕙᔅᓯᙵ -vassinnga	ᕚᖓ -vaanga
Object	2nd sg.	ᕙᒋᑦ -vagit		ᕚᑎᑦ -vaatit	ᕙᑦᑎᒋᑦ -vattigit		ᕚᑎᑦ -vaatit	ᕙᑦᑎᒋᑦ -vattigit		ᕚᑎᑦ -vaatit
Object	3rd sg.	ᕙᕋ -vara	ᕙᐃᑦ -vait	ᕙᖓ -vanga	ᕙᕗᒃ -vavuk	ᕙᓯᒃ -vasik	ᕙᖓᒃ -vangak	ᕙᕗᑦ -vavut	ᕙᓯ -vasi	ᕙᖓᑦ -vangat
Object	1st du.		ᕙᑦᑎᒍᒃ -vattiguk	ᕚᑎᒍᒃ -vaatiguk		ᕙᑦᑎᒍᒃ -vattiguk	ᕚᑎᒍᒃ -vaatiguk		ᕙᑦᑎᒍᒃ -vattiguk	ᕚᑎᒍᒃ -vaatiguk
Object	2nd du.	ᕙᔅᓯᒃ -vassik		ᕚᓯᒃ -vaasik	ᕙᔅᓯᒃ -vassik		ᕚᓯᒃ -vaasik	ᕙᔅᓯᒃ -vassik		ᕚᓯᒃ -vaasik
Object	3rd du.	ᕚᒃᑲᒃ -vaakkak	ᕚᒃᑭᒃ -vaakkik	ᕙᖏᒃ -vangik	ᕙᕗᒃ -vavuk	ᕙᓯᒃ -vasik	ᕙᖏᒃ -vangik	ᕙᕗᒃ -vavuk	ᕙᓯᒃ -vasik	ᕙᖏᒃ -vangik
Object	1st pl.		ᕙᑦᑎᒍᑦ -vattigut	ᕚᑎᒍᑦ -vaatigut		ᕙᑦᑎᒍᑦ -vattigut	ᕚᑎᒍᑦ -vaatigut		ᕙᑦᑎᒍᑦ -vattigut	ᕚᑎᒍᑦ -vaatigut
Object	2nd pl.	ᕙᔅᓯ -vassi		ᕚᓯ -vaasi	ᕙᔅᓯ -vassi		ᕚᓯ -vaasi	ᕙᔅᓯ -vassi		ᕚᓯ -vaasi
Object	3rd pl.	ᕙᒃᑲ -vakka	ᕙᑎᑦ -vatit	ᕙᖏᑦ -vangit	ᕙᕗᑦ -vavut	ᕙᓯ -vasi	ᕙᖏᑦ -vangit	ᕙᕗᑦ -vavut	ᕙᓯ -vasi	ᕙᖏᑦ -vangit

Specific verb suffixes used after consonants:
		Subject								
		1st sg.	2nd sg.	3rd sg.	1st du.	2nd du.	3rd du.	1st pl.	2nd pl.	3rd pl.
Object	1st sg.		ᐸᙵ -pannga	ᐹᖓ -paanga		ᐸᔅᓯᙵ -passinnga	ᐹᖓ -paanga		ᐸᔅᓯᙵ -passinnga	ᐹᖓ -paanga
Object	2nd sg.	ᐸᒋᑦ -pagit		ᐹᑎᑦ -paatit	ᐸᑦᑎᒋᑦ -pattigit		ᐹᑎᑦ -paatit	ᐸᑦᑎᒋᑦ -pattigit		ᐹᑎᑦ -paatit
Object	3rd sg.	ᐸᕋ -para	ᐸᐃᑦ -pait	ᐸᖓ -panga	ᐸᕗᒃ -pavuk	ᐸᓯᒃ -pasik	ᐸᖓᒃ -pangak	ᐸᕗᑦ -pavut	ᐸᓯ -pasi	ᐸᖓᑦ -pangat
Object	1st du.		ᐸᑦᑎᒍᒃ -pattiguk	ᐹᑎᒍᒃ -paatiguk		ᐸᑦᑎᒍᒃ -pattiguk	ᐹᑎᒍᒃ -paatiguk		ᐸᑦᑎᒍᒃ -pattiguk	ᐹᑎᒍᒃ -paatiguk
Object	2nd du.	ᐸᔅᓯᒃ -passik		ᐹᓯᒃ -paasik	ᐸᔅᓯᒃ -passik		ᐹᓯᒃ -paasik	ᐸᔅᓯᒃ -passik		ᐹᓯᒃ -paasik
Object	3rd du.	ᐹᒃᑲᒃ -paakkak	ᐹᒃᑭᒃ -paakkik	ᐸᖏᒃ -pangik	ᐸᕗᒃ -pavuk	ᐸᓯᒃ -pasik	ᐸᖏᒃ -pangik	ᐸᕗᒃ -pavuk	ᐸᓯᒃ -pasik	ᐸᖏᒃ -pangik
Object	1st pl.		ᐸᑦᑎᒍᑦ -pattigut	ᐹᑎᒍᑦ -paatigut		ᐸᑦᑎᒍᑦ -pattigut	ᐹᑎᒍᑦ -paatigut		ᐸᑦᑎᒍᑦ -pattigut	ᐹᑎᒍᑦ -paatigut
Object	2nd pl.	ᐸᔅᓯ -passi		ᐹᓯ -paasi	ᐸᔅᓯ -passi		ᐹᓯ -paasi	ᐸᔅᓯ -passi		ᐹᓯ -paasi
Object	3rd pl.	ᐸᒃᑲ -pakka	ᐸᑎᑦ -patit	ᐸᖏᑦ -pangit	ᐸᕗᑦ -pavut	ᐸᓯ -pasi	ᐸᖏᑦ -pangit	ᐸᕗᑦ -pavut	ᐸᓯ -pasi	ᐸᖏᑦ -pangit

==== Interrogatives ====
The specific interrogative is also sometimes used to indicate conditional forms or other aspects. It overlaps heavily with the v/p alternative form described above:

After vowels:
		Subject								
		1st sg.	2nd sg.	3rd sg.	1st du.	2nd du.	3rd du.	1st pl.	2nd pl.	3rd pl.
Object	1st sg.		ᕕᖓ -vinga	ᕚᖓ -vaanga		ᕕᓯᙵ -visinnga	ᕚᖓ -vaanga		ᕕᓯᙵ -visinnga	ᕚᖓ -vaanga
Object	2nd sg.	ᕙᒋᑦ -vagit		ᕚᑎᑦ -vaatit	ᕙᑦᑎᒋᑦ -vattigit		ᕚᑎᑦ -vaatit	ᕙᑦᑎᒋᑦ -vattigit		ᕚᑎᑦ -vaatit
Object	3rd sg.	ᕙᕋ -vara	ᕕᐅᒃ -viuk	ᕙᐅᒃ -vauk	ᕙᕗᒃ -vavuk	ᕕᑎᒍᒃ -vitiguk	ᕙᑦᔪᒃ -vajjuk	ᕙᕗᑦ -vavut	ᕕᓯᐅᒃ -visiuk	ᕙᑦᔪᒃ -vajjuk
Object	1st du.		ᕕᑦᑎᒍᒃ -vittiguk	ᕚᑎᒍᒃ -vaatiguk		ᕕᑎᒍᒃ -vitiguk	ᕚᑎᒍᒃ -vaatiguk		ᕕᑎᒍᒃ -vitiguk	ᕚᑎᒍᒃ -vaatiguk
Object	2nd du.	ᕙᔅᓯᒃ -vassik		ᕚᓯᒃ -vaasik	ᕙᔅᓯᒃ -vassik		ᕚᓯᒃ -vaasik	ᕙᔅᓯᒃ -vassik		ᕚᓯᒃ -vaasik
Object	3rd du.	ᕚᒃᑲᒃ -vaakkak	ᕕᒋᒃ -vigik	ᕙᖏᒃ -vangik	ᕙᕗᒃ -vavuk	ᕕᓯᒃᑯᒃ -visikkuk	ᕙᖏᒃ -vangik	ᕙᕗᒃ -vavuk	ᕕᓯᒃᑯᒃ -visikkuk	ᕙᖏᒃ -vangik
Object	1st pl.		ᕕᑦᑎᒍᑦ -vittigut	ᕚᑎᒍᑦ -vaatigut		ᕕᑎᒍᑦ -vitigut	ᕚᑎᒍᑦ -vaatigut		ᕕᑎᒍᑦ -vitigut	ᕚᑎᒍᑦ -vaatigut
Object	2nd pl.	ᕙᔅᓯ -vassi		ᕚᓯ -vaasi	ᕙᔅᓯ -vassi		ᕚᓯ -vaasi	ᕙᔅᓯ -vassi		ᕚᓯ -vaasi
Object	3rd pl.	ᕙᒃᑲ -vakka	ᕕᒋᑦ -vigit	ᕙᖏᑦ -vangit	ᕙᕗᑦ -vavut	ᕕᓯᐅᒃ -visiuk	ᕙᖏᑦ -vangit	ᕙᕗᑦ -vavut	ᕕᓯᐅᒃ -visiuk	ᕙᖏᑦ -vangit

After consonants:
		Subject								
		1st sg.	2nd sg.	3rd sg.	1st du.	2nd du.	3rd du.	1st pl.	2nd pl.	3rd pl.
Object	1st sg.		ᐱᖓ -pinga	ᐹᖓ -paanga		ᐱᓯᙵ -pisinnga	ᐹᖓ -paanga		ᐱᓯᙵ -pisinnga	ᐹᖓ -paanga
Object	2nd sg.	ᐸᒋᑦ -pagit		ᐹᑎᑦ -paatit	ᐸᑦᑎᒋᑦ -pattigit		ᐹᑎᑦ -paatit	ᐸᑦᑎᒋᑦ -pattigit		ᐹᑎᑦ -paatit
Object	3rd sg.	ᐸᕋ -para	ᐱᐅᒃ -piuk	ᐸᐅᒃ -pauk	ᐸᕗᒃ -pavuk	ᐱᑎᒍᒃ -pitiguk	ᐸᑦᔪᒃ -pajjuk	ᐸᕗᑦ -pavut	ᐱᓯᐅᒃ -pisiuk	ᐸᑦᔪᒃ -pajjuk
Object	1st du.		ᐱᑦᑎᒍᒃ -pittiguk	ᐹᑎᒍᒃ -paatiguk		ᐱᑎᒍᒃ -pitiguk	ᐹᑎᒍᒃ -paatiguk		ᐱᑎᒍᒃ -pitiguk	ᐹᑎᒍᒃ -paatiguk
Object	2nd du.	ᐸᔅᓯᒃ -passik		ᐹᓯᒃ -paasik	ᐸᔅᓯᒃ -passik		ᐹᓯᒃ -paasik	ᐸᔅᓯᒃ -passik		ᐹᓯᒃ -paasik
Object	3rd du.	ᐹᒃᑲᒃ -paakkak	ᐱᒋᒃ -pigik	ᐸᖏᒃ -pangik	ᐸᕗᒃ -pavuk	ᐱᓯᒃᑯᒃ -pisikkuk	ᐸᖏᒃ -pangik	ᐸᕗᒃ -pavuk	ᐱᓯᒃᑯᒃ -pisikkuk	ᐸᖏᒃ -pangik
Object	1st pl.		ᐱᑦᑎᒍᑦ -pittigut	ᐹᑎᒍᑦ -paatigut		ᐱᑎᒍᑦ -pitigut	ᐹᑎᒍᑦ -paatigut		ᐱᑎᒍᑦ -pitigut	ᐹᑎᒍᑦ -paatigut
Object	2nd pl.	ᐸᔅᓯ -passi		ᐹᓯ -paasi	ᐸᔅᓯ -passi		ᐹᓯ -paasi	ᐸᔅᓯ -passi		ᐹᓯ -paasi
Object	3rd pl.	ᐸᒃᑲ -pakka	ᐱᒋᑦ -pigit	ᐸᖏᑦ -pangit	ᐸᕗᑦ -pavut	ᐱᓯᐅᒃ -pisiuk	ᐸᖏᑦ -pangit	ᐸᕗᑦ -pavut	ᐱᓯᐅᒃ -pisiuk	ᐸᖏᑦ -pangit

==== Subjects ====
The subject of a specific verb requires a specific suffix to indicate its syntactic role:

ᐲᑕᐅᑉ ᑕᑯᔮᑎᑦ
Piitaup takujaatit
Peter sees you

The subject of a specific verb takes the following suffixes, depending on its grammatical number:

Singular	-up	/u/ disappears when it is preceded by a double vowel
Dual	-k	doubles the preceding vowel, if it is not already double
Plural	-it	/i/ disappears when it is preceded by a double vowel

All of the suffixes above delete any consonant that immediately precedes them. For example, qajaq becomes qajaup in the singular, qajaak in the dual, and qajait in the plural when it is the subject of a specific verb.

ᐸᓖᓯᐅᑉ ᑕᑯᔮᑎᑦ
Paliisiup takujaatit
A policeman sees you.

ᐸᓖᓰᒃ ᑕᑯᔮᑎᑦ
Paliisiik takujaatit
Two policemen see you.

ᐸᓖᓰᑦ ᑕᑯᔮᑎᑦ
Paliisiit takujaatit
Some policemen (more than two) see you.

==== Objects ====
The object of a specific verb needs no particular suffix at all. Thus, we can contrast inuviniq takujara – I see the dead person – with inuvinirmik takujunga – I see a dead person (see also the table for non-specific verbs above). Continuing the example from above:

ᐲᑕᐅᑉ ᐸᓖᓯ ᑕᑯᐸᐅᒃ?
Piitaup paliisi takuvauk?
Does Peter see the policeman?

ᐋᒃᑲ, ᐸᓖᓯᓂᒃ ᐲᑕ ᑕᑯᔪᖅ.
Aakka, paliisinik Piita takujuq.
No, Peter sees some policemen.

=== Changing verb classes ===
Some verbs are automatically both specific and non-specific verbs, depending only on which suffixes they receive. The verb taku- – to see – is one example. However, other verbs require an additional suffix to shift classes.

Many action verbs that specifically involve an actor performing an action on another are specific verbs that take the suffix -si- in order to become non-specific verbs:

Specific

ᖁᑭᖅᑕᕋ ᕿᒻᒥᖅ
Qukiqtara qimmiq
I just shot the dog.

Non-specific

ᖁᑭᖅᓯᔪᖓ ᕿᒻᒥᕐᒥᒃ
Qukiqsijunga qimmirmik
I just shot a dog.

Many verbs of emotion alternate between the suffixes -suk- and -gi- to change whether or not they are specific:

Specific

ᐃᓕᕋᒋᔭᕋ ᐃᓕᓭᔨ
Iliragijara ilisaiji
I'm intimidated by the teacher

Non-specific

ᐃᓕᕋᓱᒃᑐᖓ ᐃᓕᓭᔨᒥᒃ
Ilirasuktunga ilisaijimik
I'm intimidated by a teacher

This is important when attributing an emotion to a person without designating the cause. To do so, Inuktitut always uses the non-specific form:

ᑯᑉᐱᐊᓱᒃᑐᖓ
Kuppiasuktunga
I'm afraid

=== Reflexive verbs ===
A reflexive verb is a verb which must have both an object and a subject, but where, in some context, both the object and the subject are identical. In Inuktitut, this situation is expressed by using a specific verb but by affixing a non-specific ending to it.

Specific

ᓇᓄᖅ ᖁᑭᖅᑕᕋ
Nanuq qukiqtara
I just shot the polar bear

Non-specific

ᓇᓄᕐᒥᒃ ᖁᑭᖅᓯᔪᖓ
Nanurmik qukiqsijunga
I just shot a polar bear

Reflexive

ᖁᑭᖅᑐᖓ
Qukiqtunga
I just shot myself

== Verbs in secondary clauses ==
A verb that has been fully inflected as described above is a complete proposition able to stand on its own. However, when clauses are linked in Inuktitut, a number of other morphosyntactic phenomena come into play.

First, many secondary structures use other classes of verb suffixes than those used in main clauses. This article cannot cover the whole of Inuktitut morphology, especially since each class of inflexion has its own set of non-specific and specific endings and they vary significantly from dialect to dialect. The examples below are based on the North Baffin dialect.

=== Fourth person inflection ===
In secondary clauses, third person inflections must make a distinction between instances where the two clauses have the same subject and those where the subject is different. In English, the sentence "He is leaving because he is tired" is ambiguous unless you know whether or not the two "he"s refer to different people. In Inuktitut, in contrast, this situation is clearly marked:

ᐊᐅᓪᓚᖅ ᑐᖅ ᑕᖃ ᒐᒪ
aullaq- -tuq taqa- -gama
{to leave} {3SG NSP} {to be tired} {3SG NSP CAUS}
He_{1} is leaving because he_{1} is tired

ᐊᐅᓪᓚᖅ ᑐᖅ ᑕᖃ ᖕᒪᑦ
aullaq- -tuq taqa- -ngmat
{to leave} {3SG NSP} {to be tired} {3SG.OBV NSP CAUS}
He_{1} is leaving because he_{2} is tired

The set of suffixes used to indicate the other third person is sometimes called the third person obviative, but is also often called the fourth person. This additional grammatical person is a pervasive feature of Inuktitut.

=== Causative ===
The causative is used to link propositions that follow logically. It is much more broadly used in Inuktitut than similar structures are in English. The causative is one of the most important ways of connecting two clauses in Inuktitut:

ᖃᓐᓂᖅ ᒪᑦ ᙯ ᙱᑦ ᑐᖓ
qanniq- -mat qai- -nngit- -tunga
{to snow} {4 NSP CAUS} {to come} {not} {1SG NSP}
Because it is snowing, I am not coming.

=== Conditional & subjunctive ===
This structure has a meaning closer to an "if... then..."' sentence in English than the kind of structure usually referred to as "conditional". It generally involves using an additional marker of the future tense or the conditional mood in the main clause:

ᙯ ᒍᕕᑦ ᓂᕆ ᓂᐊᖅ ᐱᑦ
qai- -guvit niri- -niaq- -pit
{to come} {2SG NSP COND} {to eat} {FUT} {2SG NSP INTERR}
If you come, will you eat?

ᖃᓐᓂᖅ ᐸᑦ ᐊᓂ ᓇᔭᖅ ᙱᑦ ᑐᖓ
qanniq- -pat ani- -najaq- -nngit- -tunga
{to snow} {4SG NSP COND} {to go out} {COND} {not} {1SG NSP}
If it were snowing, I wouldn't go out.

=== Frequentative ===
The frequentative endings indicate that two propositions routinely occur together. In English, this is expressed with words like usually, often, generally and whenever. It generally involves using an additional marker in the main clause to indicate frequency:

ᑳᒃ ᑳᖓᒥ ᓂᕆ ᖃᑦᑕᖅ ᑐᖅ
kaak- -kaangami niri- -qattaq- -tuq
{to be hungry} {3SG NSP FREQ} {to eat} {usually} {3SG NSP}
When he's hungry, he eats.

=== Dubitative ===
The dubitative suffixes express uncertainty or disbelief about a proposition:

ᓈᓚᒃ ᒪᙶᕐᒥᑎᑦ ᓇᓗ ᔪᖓ
naalak- -mangaarmitit nalu- -junga
{to listen} {3.SBJ 2.OBJ SP DUB} {to not know} {1 NSP}
'I don't know whether or not she listens to you.'

== Verb modifiers ==
In addition to root verb morphemes and inflexions to indicate the number and person of the arguments, Inuktitut has a large inventory of morphemes that modify the verb and may be placed between the root morpheme and inflexions, or at the end of the inflected verb. In pedagogic and linguistic literature on Inuktitut, these infix morphemes are often called verb chunks. These modifiers indicate tense, aspect, manner and a variety of functions that in English require auxiliary verbs, adverbs, or other structures.

This section can only list a small selection of the many verb chunks, in order to give a sense for how the system works:

=== Modifiers of manner ===
ᙱᑦ -nngit-	negates the verb	This suffix deletes a preceding consonant.		ᖁᕕᐊᓱᒃ ᙱᑦ ᑐᖓ quviasuk- -nngit- -tunga {to be happy} not 1SG 'I am not happy.' ᓴᓇ ᙱᑦ ᑐᖅ sana- -nngit- -tuq {to work, to be employed} not 3SG; He doesn't work. (= He is unemployed.)
ᓗᐊᖅ -luaq-	excessively	This suffix deletes a preceding consonant.		ᓴᓇ ᓗᐊᖅ ᑐᖅ sana- -luaq- -tuq {to work, to be employed} excessively 3SG; He works too much. ᓯᓂᒃ ᓗᐊᖅ ᑐᑎᑦ sinik- -luaq- -tutit {to sleep} excessively 2SG; You sleep too much.
-galuaq-	although, but	This suffix undergoes consonant sandhi, depending on the preceding letter context		
-galuaq-	although, but	...(Any Vowel)	ᒐᓗᐊᖅ -galuaq-	ᐊᓂ ᒐᓗᐊᖅ ᑐᖓ ani- -galuaq- -tunga {to go out} although 1SG; Even though I just went out...
-galuaq-	although, but	...k	ᑲᓗᐊᖅ -kaluaq- changes the g into k g + k = kk	ᖁᕕᐊᓱᒃ ᒐᓗᐊᖅ ᑐᖅ quviasuk- -galuaq- -tuq {to be happy} although 3SG; Although she is happy...
-galuaq-	although, but	...t	ᑲᓗᐊᖅ -kaluaq- changes the t into k t + k = kk	ᖃᓐᓂᖅ ᙱᑦ ᒐᓗᐊᖅ ᑐᖅ qanniq- -nngit- -galuaq- -tuq {to snow} not although 3SG; Although it isn't snowing...
-galuaq-	although, but	...q	ᕋᓗᐊᖅ -raluaq- deletes the q q + g = r	ᖃᓐᓂᖅ ᒐᓗᐊᖅ ᑐᖅ qanniq- -galuaq- -tuq {to snow} although 3SG; Although it is snowing...

Consequently, one can say:

ᖃᓐᓂᖅ ᓗᐊᖅ ᙱᑦ ᒐᓗᐊᖅ ᑐᖅ ᐊᓂ ᙱᑦ ᑐᖓ
qanniq- -luaq- -nngit- -galuaq- -tuq ani- -nngit- -tunga
{to snow} excessively not although 3SG {to go out} not 1SG
Even though it's not snowing a great deal, I'm not going out.

=== Modifiers of tense ===
While Indo-European languages tend to make tense distinctions in terms of before or after some reference event, Inuktitut makes a number of somewhat fuzzy distinctions depending on how far into the past or the future the event took place. In English, this distinction requires additional words to place the event in time, but in Inuktitut the tense marker itself carries much of that information.

ᓛᖅ -laaq-	future, tomorrow or later	This suffix deletes a preceding consonant.	ᐅᖃᖅ ᓛᖅ ᑕᕋ uqaq- -laaq- -tara {to talk} {later, after today} {1.SBJ 3.OBJ SP} I'll talk to him some other time.
ᓂᐊᖅ -niaq-	later today	This suffix nasalises a preceding consonant.	ᑎᑭᑉ ᓂᐊᖅ ᑐᖅ tikip- -niaq- -tuq {to arrive} {later today} {3SG NSP} He is arriving later.
ᓕᖅ -liq-	in process, right now	This suffix deletes a preceding consonant. When applied to a state verb, it emphasises that the state holds at the present moment. For action verbs, it means that the action is taking place right now, instead of having just finished.	ᖃᖓᑕᓲ ᒥᓪ ᓕᖅ ᑐᖅ qangatasuu mil- -liq- -tuq airplane {to land, to touch down} {right now} {3SG NSP} The airplane is landing.
ᕋᑖᖅ -rataaq-	immediate past, a moment ago, no more than a few seconds	This suffix deletes a preceding consonant.	ᐃᓱᒪ ᕋᑖᖅ ᑐᖓ isuma- -rataaq- -tunga {to think} {just a moment ago} {1SG NSP} I was just thinking
ᖅᑲᐅ -qqau-	just now, a few minutes ago	This suffix deletes a preceding consonant.	ᑐᓵ ᖅᑲᐅ ᙱᑦ ᑕᒋᑦ tusaa- -qqau- -nngit- -tagit {to hear} {just now} not {1.SBJ 2.OBJ SP} 'I didn't hear you just now'
ᓚᐅᖅ -lauq-	more remote past, yesterday or earlier, up to perhaps a year	This suffix deletes a preceding consonant.	ᐃᒡᓗ ᒥᒃ ᓂᐅᕕᐊᖅ ᓚᐅᖅ ᑐᖓ iglu -mik niuviaq- -lauq- -tunga house ACC.SG {to purchase} {recently, in the last year} {1SG NSP} 'I bought a house recently'
ᓚᐅᖅᓯᒪ -lauqsima-	remote past, several years or more ago	This suffix deletes a preceding consonant.	ᐃᓄᒃᑎᑐᑦ ᒥᒃ ᐃᓕᓭ ᓚᐅᖅᓯᒪ ᔪᖓ inuktitut -mik ilisai- -lauqsima- -junga inuktitut ACC.SG {to study} {some years ago} {1SG NSP} I studied Inuktitut some time ago.

== Ergativity in Inuktitut ==
Inuktitut marks the subject of a non-specific verb and the object of a specific verb in the same way – the absence of a specific morphological marker – and marks the subject of a specific verb and the object of a non-specific verb with particular morphological elements. This kind of morphosyntactic structure is often called an ergative structure. However, ergativity in its most clearly defined instances is primarily about transitive and intransitive verbs. This dichotomy is not identical to the specific/non-specific verb distinction in Inuktitut, since Inuktitut usage is also concerned with the definiteness of the objects of verb,

Consequently, the application of the notion of ergativity to Inuktitut, and to many other languages, is somewhat controversial. Regardless, by analogy with more conventionally ergative languages, the -up, -k, -it endings described above are often called ergative suffixes which are taken to be indicative of the ergative case, while the -mik, -rnik, -nik endings (see Non-specific verbs – Objects) are called accusative. This usage is often seen in linguistics literature describing Inuktitut, and sometimes in pedagogic literature and dictionaries, but remains a quite foreign vocabulary to most Inuit.

== See also ==
- Greenlandic grammar
