= Causative mood =

Linguistic mood

In linguistic morphology, causative mood serves to express a causal relation, e.g., a logical inference relation, between the current clause and the clause or sentence it refers to. It occurs, for example, in Eskimo-Aleut languages.

Causative mood is not to be confused with the unrelated notion of causative voice, a valency-shifting operation in many languages.

== Inuktitut ==
In Inuktitut, the causative is used to link propositions that follow logically. It is much more broadly used in Inuktitut than similar structures are in English. The causative is one of the most important ways of connecting two clauses in Inuktitut:

ᖃᓐᓂᖅ ᒪᑦ ᙯ ᙱᑦ ᑐᖓ
qanniq- -mat qai- -nngit- -tunga
{to snow} {4 NSP CAUS} {to come} {not} {1SG NSP}
Because it is snowing, I am not coming. (Inuktitut, North Baffin dialect)

taku- -mmat
{to see} {4 SG NSP}
because he sees; when he/she saw. (Arctic Quebec Inuktitut; Dorais 1990, p.225)

== West Greenlandic ==
In West Greenlandic, the causative (sometimes called the conjunctive) is used to construct subordinate clauses that express cause or time (when in the past) (Fortescue 1990, p.314). It is used to mean "because", "since" or "when", sometimes also "that". The causative is used also in main clauses to imply an underlying cause.

qasu-gami innar-poq
{be tired}-CAU/3SG {go to bed}-3SG
"He went to bed because he was tired" (Greenlandic)

matta-ttor-ama
blubber-eat-CAU/1SG
"I've eaten blubber (that's why I'm not hungry)" (Greenlandic)

ani-guit eqqaama-ssa-vat teriannia-qar-mat
{go out}-COND/2SG remember-FUT-IMP fox-are-CAUS
"If you go out, remember that there are foxes" (Greenlandic)

== Yup'ik ==
In Central Alaskan Yup'ik, the causal suffix -nga is used to form subordinate clauses that are translated as "because", or "when".
