= Greenlandic phonology =

This article discusses the phonological system of the Greenlandic language.

== Vowels ==
Ranges of West Greenlandic monophthongs on a vowel chart.

	Front	Back
Close	i ⟨i, e⟩	u ⟨u, o⟩
Open	a ⟨a⟩	

The Greenlandic three-vowel system, composed of /i, u, a/, is typical for an Eskimo–Aleut language. Double vowels are analyzed as two morae and so they are phonologically a vowel sequence and not a long vowel. They are also orthographically written as two vowels. There is only one diphthong, /ai/, which occurs only at the ends of words.

- Before a uvular consonant (/ɴ/, /q/ or /ʁ/);
  - /i/ is realized allophonically as [e], [ɛ] or [ɐ]; thus, spelled ⟨e⟩.
  - /u/ is realized allophonically as [o] or [ɔ]; thus, spelled ⟨o⟩.
  - /a/ becomes retracted to [ɑ].
- Before non-uvular consonants :
  - /i/ is closed to [i] word-initially before non-uvulars.
  - /u/ is closed to [u] before labials and word-initially before non-uvulars.
  - /a/ is fronted to [a] word-finally and word-initially before non-uvulars.
- Coronal-labial harmony:
  - /u/ is retracted to [ʉ] between alveolar and post-alveolar consonants.
  - /i/ is rounded to [y] between labial consonants.
- Elsewhere:
  - /i/ is opened to [ɪ].
  - /u/ is closed to [ʊ].
  - /a/ is centred to [ə].

Other authors may use slightly different notation, but Hagerup concludes that the notation is comparable.

The allophonic lowering of /i/ and /u/ before uvular consonants is shown in the modern orthography by writing /i/ and /u/ as ⟨e⟩ and ⟨o⟩ respectively before ⟨q⟩ and ⟨r⟩. For example:

- /ui/ "husband" pronounced [ui].
- /uiqarpuq/ "(s)he has a husband" pronounced [ueqɑppɔq] and written ⟨ueqarpoq⟩.
- /illu/ "house" pronounced [iɬɬu].
- /illuqarpuq/ "(s)he has a house" pronounced [iɬɬoqɑppɔq] and written ⟨illoqarpoq⟩.

Nonetheless, still there are some minimal pairs of the lowering allophony, in the case of ⟨rC⟩: aallaat "gun" [aaɬɬaat] vs. aarlaat "February" [ɑɑɬɬaat].

== Consonants ==
Greenlandic has consonants at five points of articulation: labial, alveolar, palatal, velar and uvular. It distinguishes stops, fricatives, and nasals at the labial, alveolar, velar, and uvular points of articulation.

Consonants of Kalaallisut
	Labial	Alveolar		Palatal	Velar	Uvular
	Labial	plain	lateral	Palatal	Velar	Uvular
Nasals	m ⟨m⟩	n ⟨n⟩			ŋ ⟨ng⟩	ɴ ⟨rn⟩ (Note: The uvular nasal [ɴ] is not found in all dialects and there is dialectal variability regarding its status as a phoneme.)
Plosives	p ⟨p⟩	t ⟨t⟩ (Note: Short [t͡s] is in complementary distribution with short [t], with the former appearing before /i/ and the latter elsewhere; both are written ⟨t⟩ and could be analysed as belonging to the same phoneme /t/.)			k ⟨k⟩	q ⟨q⟩
Affricates		t͡sː ⟨ts⟩ (Note: Before /i/, long [t͡sː] occurs while long [tː] does not, so long [t͡sː] before /i/ could be analysed as long /tː/. However, before /a/ and /u/, both long [t͡sː] and long [tː] occur (except in some dialects, including that of Greenland's third largest town). For this reason, long [t͡sː] is always written ⟨ts⟩, e.g. asavatsigut ‘you love us’, atsa ‘aunt (father's sister)’, Maniitsoq.)				
Fricatives	v ⟨v⟩ (Note: ⟨ff⟩ is the way of writing the devoiced /vː/ geminate; /rv/ is written ⟨rf⟩; otherwise, ⟨f⟩ occurs only in loanwords.)	s ⟨s⟩	ɬː ⟨ll⟩ (Note: When /l/ is geminated, it is heard as a [ɬː] fricative sound.)	(ʃ (Note: /ʃ/ has merged with [s] in all dialects except those of the Sisimiut–Maniitsoq–Nuuk–Paamiut area, but still written ⟨s⟩.))	ɣ ⟨g⟩	ʁ ⟨r⟩
Approximants			l ⟨l⟩	j ⟨j⟩		

- The labiodental fricative [f] is contrastive only in loanwords.
- Often, Danish loanwords containing ⟨b d g⟩ preserve these in writing, but that does not imply a change in pronunciation, for example ⟨baaja⟩ [paːja] "beer" and ⟨Guuti⟩ [kuːtˢi] "God"; these are pronounced exactly as /p t k/.

== Phonotactics ==
The Kalaallisut syllable is simple, allowing syllables of (C)(V)V(C), where C is a consonant and V is a vowel and VV is a double vowel or word-final /ai/. Native words may begin with only a vowel or /p, t, k, q, s, m, n/ and may end only in a vowel or /p, t, k, q/ or rarely /n/. Consonant clusters occur only over syllable boundaries, and their pronunciation is subject to regressive assimilations that convert them into geminates. All non-nasal consonants in a cluster are voiceless.

== Prosody ==
Greenlandic prosody does not include stress as an autonomous category; instead, prosody is determined by tonal and durational parameters. Intonation is influenced by syllable weight: heavy syllables are pronounced in a way that may be perceived as stress. Heavy syllables include syllables with long vowels and syllables before consonant clusters. The last syllable is stressed in words with fewer than four syllables and without long vowels or consonant clusters. The antepenultimate syllable is stressed in words with more than four syllables that are all light. In words with many heavy syllables, syllables with long vowels are considered heavier than syllables before consonant clusters.

Geminate consonants are pronounced long, almost exactly with the double duration of a single consonant.

Intonation in indicative clauses usually rises on the antepenultimate syllable, falls on the penult and rises on the last syllable. Interrogative intonation rises on the penultimate and falls on the last syllable.

== Morphophonology ==
Greenlandic phonology distinguishes itself phonologically from the other Inuit languages by a series of assimilations.

Greenlandic phonology allows clusters of two consonants, but phonetically, the first consonant in a cluster is assimilated to the second one resulting in a geminate consonant. If the first consonant is /ʁ/ or /q/, it nevertheless opens/retracts the preceding vowel, which in case of /i/ and /u/ is then written ⟨e⟩ and ⟨o⟩. Geminate /l/ is pronounced [ɬː]. Geminate /ɣ/ is pronounced [çː ~ xː]. Geminate /ʁ/ is pronounced [χː]. Geminate /v/ is pronounced [fː] and written ⟨ff, rf⟩.

These assimilations mean that one of the most recognizable Inuktitut words, iglu ("house"), is illu in Greenlandic, where the /ɡl/ consonant cluster of Inuktitut is assimilated into a voiceless alveolar lateral fricative. And the word Inuktitut itself, when translated into Kalaallisut, becomes Inuttut.

When an affix beginning with a consonant is added to a stem that ends in a consonant, the following rules apply (C¹ refers to the final consonant of the stem, C² to the initial consonant of the affix):

/C¹C²/ is realised as [C²C²], e.g. /pl/ → [ll] (more narrowly transcribed [ɬɬ]), except as in the next paragraph. In spelling, ⟨C¹C²⟩ becomes ⟨C²C²⟩, except for ⟨rC²⟩ and *⟨qC²⟩ which become ⟨rC²⟩ (this is necessary to indicate the retracted quality of /a/, while the open qualities of /i/ and /u/ are also indicated by spelling them ⟨e⟩ and ⟨o⟩), except for *⟨rq⟩ and ⟨qq⟩ which become ⟨qq⟩.

If the second consonant is /ʁ/, /v/, or /ɣ/, the following applies:
/C¹ʁ/ ⟨C¹r⟩ becomes [qq] ⟨qq⟩.
/C¹v/ becomes [pp]. In spelling, *⟨C¹v⟩ becomes ⟨pp⟩, except for *⟨rv⟩ and *⟨qv⟩ which become ⟨rp⟩ (this is necessary to indicate the retracted quality of /a/, while the open qualities of /i/ and /u/ are also indicated by spelling them ⟨e⟩ and ⟨o⟩).
/C¹ɣ/ ⟨C¹g⟩ becomes [kk] ⟨kk⟩, except for */ʁɣ/ ⟨rg⟩ and */qɣ/ ⟨qg⟩ which become [ʁ] ⟨r⟩.

The consonant /v/ has disappeared between /u/ and /i/ or /a/. Therefore, affixes beginning with ⟨-va⟩ or ⟨-vi⟩ have forms without [v] when they are suffixed to stems that end in /u/.

The Old Greenlandic diphthong /au/ has assimilated to /aa/, so when a suffix beginning with /u/ comes after a single /a/, the /u/ becomes /a/. When a suffix beginning with /u/ comes after a double /aa/, a /j/ is instead inserted before the /u/. To summarise: /aau/ → /aaju/, otherwise /au/ → /aa/.

The vowel /i/ of modern Greenlandic is the result of a historic merger of the Proto-Eskimo–Aleut vowels *i and *ɪ. The fourth vowel was still present in Old Greenlandic, as attested by Hans Egede. In modern West Greenlandic, the difference between the two original vowels can be discerned morphophonologically only in certain environments. The vowel that was originally *ɪ has the variant [a] when preceding another vowel and sometimes disappears before certain suffixes.

The degree to which the assimilation of consonant clusters has taken place is an important dialectal feature separating Polar Eskimo, Inuktun, which still allows some ungeminated consonant clusters, from West and East Greenlandic. East Greenlandic (Tunumiit oraasiat) has shifted some geminate consonants, such as [ɬː] to [tː]. Thus, for example, the East Greenlandic name of a particular town is Ittoqqortoormiit, which would appear as Illoqqortoormiut in Kalaallisut.

== See also ==
- Inuit phonology

== Sources ==
- Bjørnum, Stig (2003). Grønlandsk grammatik (in Danish). Atuagkat. ISBN 978-87-90133-14-6.
- Fortescue, Michael (1984). West Greenlandic. Routledge. ISBN 978-0-7099-1069-5.
- Fortescue, Michael (1990). "Basic Structures and Processes in West Greenlandic" (PDF). In Collins, Dirmid R. F. (ed.). Arctic Languages: An Awakening. Paris: UNESCO. p. 317. ISBN 978-92-3-102661-4.
- Hagerup, Asger (2011). A Phonological Analysis of Vowel Allophony in West Greenlandic (Thesis). NTNU. hdl:11250/242778.
- Jacobsen, Birgitte (2000). "The Question of 'Stress' in West Greenlandic:An Acoustic Investigation of Rhythmicization, Intonation, and Syllable Weight". Phonetica. 57 (1): 40–67. doi:10.1159/000028458. PMID 10867570. S2CID 202654006.
- Mahieu, Marc-Antoine & Tersis, Nicole (2009). Variations on polysynthesis: the Eskaleut languages. Typological studies in language. Vol. 86. John Benjamins. ISBN 978-90-272-0667-1.
- Mennecier, Philippe (1995). Le tunumiisut, dialecte inuit du Groenland oriental: description et analyse. Collection linguistique (in French). Vol. 78. Société de linguistique de Paris, Peeters Publishers. ISBN 978-2-252-03042-4.
- Petersen, Robert (1981). De grønlandske dialekters fordeling [The distribution of the Greenlandic dialects] (PDF). Vort sprog – vor kultur (in Danish).
- Rischel, Jørgen (1974). Topics in West Greenlandic Phonology. Copenhagen: Akademisk Forlag. ISBN 978-87-500-1438-6.
- Rischel, Jørgen (1985). "Was There a Fourth Vowel in Old Greenlandic?". International Journal of American Linguistics. 51 (4): 553–555. doi:10.1086/465970. S2CID 145726246.
- Rischel, Jørgen. "grønlandsk". Den Store Danske (in Danish).
- Sadock, Jerrold (2003). A Grammar of Kalaallisut (West Greenlandic Inuttut). Munich: Lincom Europa. ISBN 978-3-89586-234-2.
- Underhill, Robert (1976). "The Case for an Abstract Segment in Greenlandic". International Journal of American Linguistics. 42 (4): 349–358. doi:10.1086/465439. JSTOR 1264267. S2CID 144208431.
- Vebæk, Mâliâraq (2006). The southernmost People of Greenland-Dialects and Memories. Monographs on Greenland. Vol. 337. doi:10.26530/OAPEN_342373. ISBN 978-87-635-1273-2.
