= Dubitative mood (Eskimo) =

Verb form in Eskaleut languages

In Eskaleut languages, the dubitative mood (abbreviated dub) is a verb form used for dependent adverbial clauses with the meaning 'whether'. The following example is from North Alaskan Inupiaq:

taatna-tun qasruniq-mi nutqaŋa+kmaŋaata qiñiq+iaq+naq+tut
thatway-SIM.S eddy-LOC.S stop+DUB.3P see-go.to.V-should.be.Ved-IND.3P
'You should go to see whether they [salmon] have stopped at the eddy like that.'

Due to the broader meaning of the term mood in the context of Eskimo grammar, the dubitative can be considered outside of the proper scope of grammatical mood. Also, its meaning is not related to that of the dubitative moods of non-Eskimo languages.

== Bibliography ==
- Nagai, Tadataka (2006). Agentive and patientive verb bases in North Alaskan Inupiaq (PhD). University of Alaska Fairbanks. ProQuest 305351183.
