= Jerrold Sadock =

American linguist

Jerrold M. "Jerry" Sadock is an American linguist and Glen A. Lloyd Distinguished Service Professor Emeritus in Linguistics and the Humanities Collegiate Division at the University of Chicago. Among other things, he is known for founding the grammatical theory of Autolexical Syntax (aka Automodular Grammar). Sadock is primarily a theoretical linguist, having written a number of influential works on noun incorporation, morphology and pragmatics, but is also an authority on West Greenlandic and Yiddish.

He received his B.A. in chemistry from the University of Illinois at Urbana-Champaign in 1965, and an M.A. in linguistics in 1967 and a PhD in linguistics in 1969 from the same institution.

== Bibliography ==
A list of his works up through 2009 can be found in the preface to the Festschrift in his honor.

- Sadock, Jerrold (1974). Toward a linguistic theory of speech acts. New York: Academic Press. ISBN 0-12-614350-1.
- Sadock, Jerrold (1991). Autolexical Syntax: A Theory of Parallel Grammatical Representations. Chicago: University of Chicago Press. ISBN 0-226-73345-9.
- Sadock, Jerrold (2003). A Grammar of Kalaallisut. Munich: LINCOM. ISBN 3-89586-234-7.
- Sadock, Jerrold M. (2012). The Modular Architecture of Grammar. Cambridge: Cambridge University Press. ISBN 978-1-107-01194-6.
