= Langaard =

Langaard is a surname. Notable people with the surname include:

- Borghild Langaard (1883–1939), Norwegian operatic soprano
- Christian Langaard (1849–1922), Norwegian industrialist and art collector
- Conrad Langaard (1823–1897), Norwegian businessman
- Conrad Langaard (tennis) (1890–1950), Norwegian tennis player
- Knut Christian Langaard (1886–1965), Norwegian athlete
- Mads Langaard (1815–1891), Norwegian brewery owner and industrialist
