= Linge Langård =

Norwegian actress and singer (1905–1981)

- Born: May 20, 1905; Kviteseid Municipality, Norway
- Died: September 23, 1981 (aged 76)
- Occupations: Actress and singer
- Spouse(s): Knut Christian Langaard; Knut Henrik Lund
- Father: Didrik Cappelen
- Relatives: Didrik Cappelen; Hans Cappelen

Ingrid "Linge" Langård (a.k.a. Linge Langaard, née Cappelen, May 20, 1905 – September 23, 1981), was a Norwegian actress, singer, and fair organizer. She was the owner of the Lillemannequin modeling agency, and she held fashion shows around Norway for several years. She organized several "housewife fairs" (Norwegian: husmormesser).

== Background and family ==
Linge Cappelen grew up in Skien as the daughter of the Supreme Court lawyer Didrik Cappelen. While still living in her hometown, she occasionally sang and danced in local shows in support of charitable causes. She married Knut Christian Langaard, the son of the businessman Christian Langaard. Knut Langaard was the owner of the Staur Farm for a time, and he acted in the film Eskimo (1930). Her marriage with Langaard ended in divorce, and in 1959 she married the sculptor Knut Henrik Lund.

== Career ==
Langård made her stage debut at age 23 in Oslo in 1928, when the theater manager at the Casino revue theater engaged her to perform together with the well-known actors Lalla Carlsen, Harald Steen, Signe Heide Steen, and Frithjof Køhler. The performance was composed of well-known numbers from various older revues, and it was the last before Casino closed its doors for good. She received mixed reviews of her performance at Casino. After several performances in Oslo, Langård and the ensemble from Casino went on to Bergen, where they had a new premiere of their revue lineup with the new performance title For fulde seil (Full Sail Ahead). Shortly after the revue's premiere in Bergen, Linge Cappelen became engaged to Knut Langaard.

In August 1928, Linge Cappelen was performing in a new revue; this time it was Bokken Lasson that had engaged her for the opening performance of Vi og våres. Figarorevyen 1928 on the Figaro revue stage on Stortingsgata, a venue that the Oslo public had previously known as Balkongen. In 1930, after she had married Knut Langaard, she and her husband toured with the Kronstad-Langård-turneen theater ensemble with the farce Guttebassen by Margaret Margo.

After the Second World War, Linge Langård became a sewing and overstitching course instructor. She was employed as a consultant in the Norwegian Housewives Association, and among other things she traveled around the country giving courses and lectures. She became a key person in the association's initiative to hold "housewife fairs" around the country.

Linge Langård was one of Norway's national celebrities of her time, and she was involved in advertising various Norwegian producers. The chocolate manufacturer Freia engaged her to advertise one of its brands, Freia Selskaps Sjokolade. Together with Leif Enger, she recorded the advertising song "Freia Quick-fox" (a.k.a. "Freia Selskaps Sjokolade") which was released in 1956. The recording was re-released in 2012 in the compilation Historiske Reklameplater. She also promoted Norwegian woolen producers and clothing manufacturers, including Sandnes Uldvarefabrikk and Nord-Trøndelag clothing factories.
