= Conrad Langaard =

Norwegian businessman

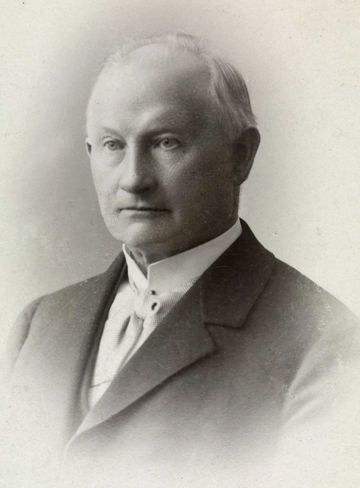
Conrad Christian Parnemann Langaard

Conrad Christian Parnemann Langaard (18 November 1823 – 11 August 1897) was a Norwegian businessman. He was the founder of the tobacco company, Conrad Langaard A/S.

== Biography ==
Langaard was born at Lillesand in Nedenes county, Norway as a son of sea captain Mads Christian Langaard (1774–1854) and Ellevine Ellefsen (1792–1874). He was a brother of Mads Langaard Through him, he was an uncle of business executive Christian Langaard and a grand-uncle of art historian Johan Henrik Langaard (1899- 1988).

From March 1857 he was married to Henriette Bull (1829–1867), and from February 1869 he was married to Andrea Serene Jensen (1821–1894), a sister of Lutheran priest and dramatist Peter Andreas Jensen (1812-1867). Through his son, factory owner Rasmus Agerup Langaard (1860–1908), he was a grandfather of tennis player Conrad Langaard.

In 1841, he moved to Christiania (now Oslo) with his brother Mads Langaard, who later founded Frydenlunds Brewery A/S. He entered the tobacco industry in 1849, and founded the eponymous company Conrad Langaard A/S in 1854. Starting from a tobacco factory in Oslo, the company eventually became Norway's largest wholesale distributor of tobacco products. Langaard was also a ship-owner, and became one of the wealthiest persons in Norway. Conrad Langaard died in 1897 and business management was then taken over by his only son Rasmus Langaard. The company he founded still exists as a division of Olav Thon Group.

Olav Thon Group (Olav Thon Gruppen) is owned by the Olav Thon Foundation (Olav Thon Stiftelsen). Olav Thon Group operates primarily in the retail and hotel sectors. It hold a position in shopping centers located in Norway and Sweden as well as Thon Hotels which is one of Norway's leading hotel chains.
