= Conrad Langaard (tennis) =

Norwegian tennis player

- Born: 6 August 1890; Oslo, Norway
- Died: 24 December 1950 (aged 60); Oslo, Norway

Conrad Langaard (6 August 1890 – 24 December 1950) was a Norwegian tennis player.

He was born in Kristiania as a son of merchant and factory owner Rasmus Agerup Langaard (1860–1908) and his wife Laura Nannestad Holmboe (b. 1869). His paternal grandfather was Conrad Langaard (1823–1897), founder of the company of the same name. As such, he was a grandnephew of Mads Langaard, a first cousin once removed of Christian Langaard, and a second cousin of Johan Henrik Langaard.

He represented the club Oslo TK. He participated at the Summer Olympics in 1912, 1920 and 1924. In 1912 he placed fifth in doubles, and in 1920 he placed fifth in doubles together with Jack Nielsen.
