= Foundations in Norway =

Type of legal entity for foundations in Norway

Foundations in Norway (Norwegian: Bokmål: stiftelse; Nynorsk: stifting) are independent i.e. self-owning juridical entities disposing assets that have been given by will, gift or other juridical dispositions for one or more purposes.

== Information ==
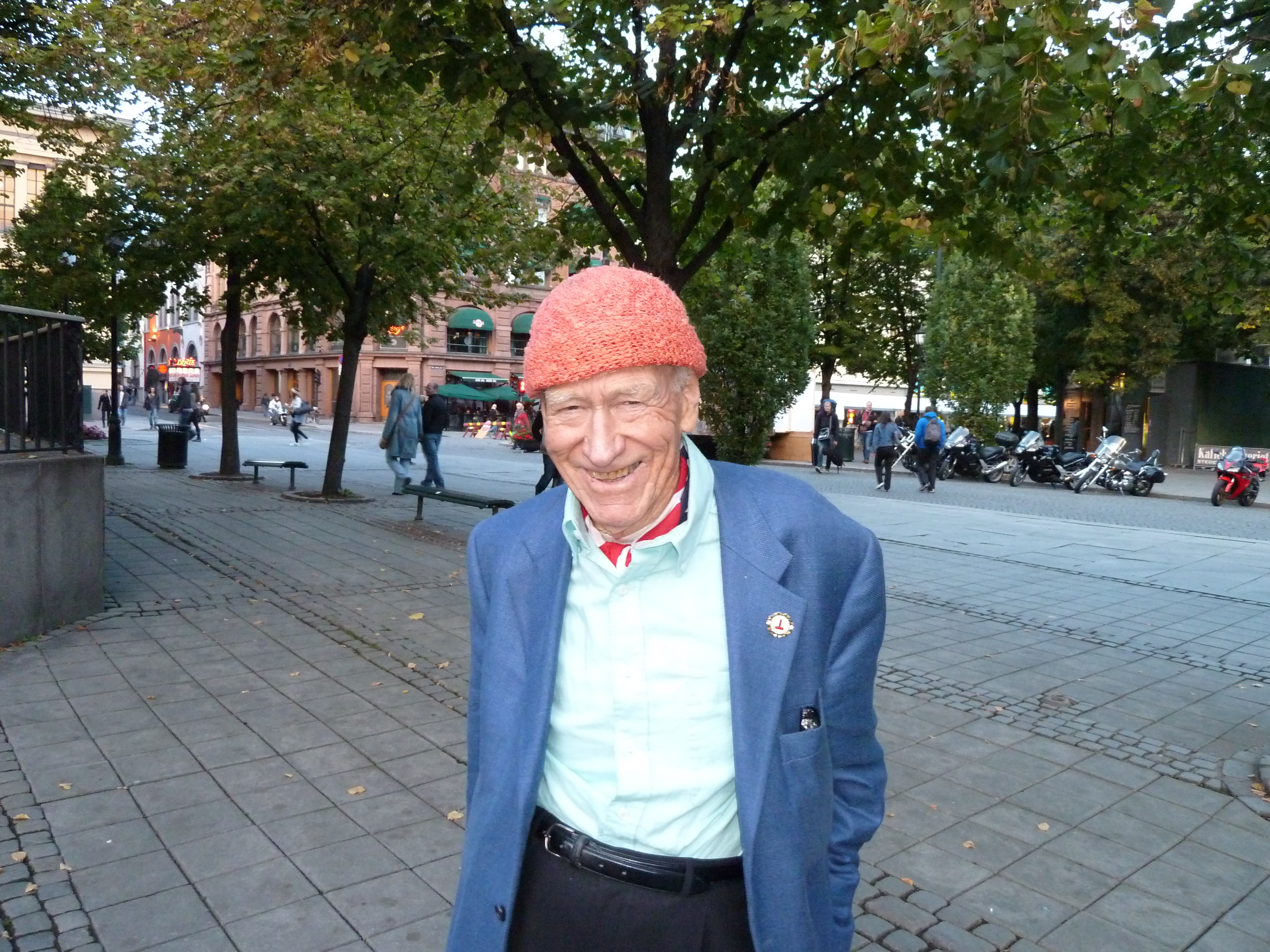
Olav Thon's foundation is a sizable business sector participant and one of the country's bigger real estate owners. With assets for approximately 25 billion NOK, it is the biggest in Norway.

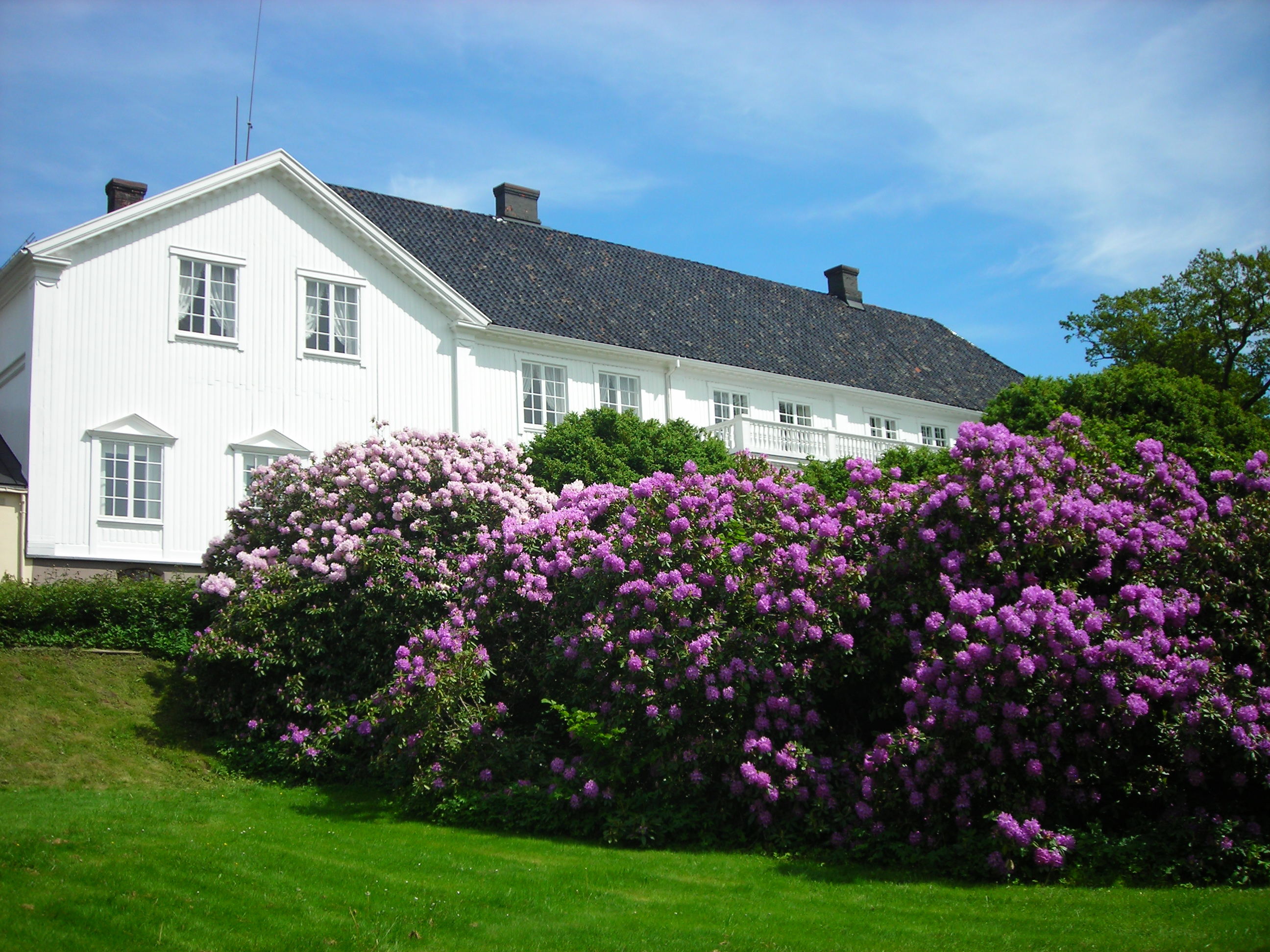
The interior of the Rød Manor is owned by the foundation The Anker Collections.

=== Basic ===
There are approximately 7,600 foundations in Norway. Based on a total capital of nearly 100 billion crowns, foundations possess and control assets of estimated 200–300 billions. They constitute a small but economically important contribution to Norway's social and cultural life and to sports, education, and science. Norwegian foundations partly employ and partly engage approximately 35,500 individuals. Most foundations are located in the capital Oslo (the biggest city) and Bergen (the second biggest city). However, city-based foundations often cover most or all parts of the Kingdom.

=== Legislation and regulatory authorities ===
Foundations are regulated by the Foundation Law of June 15, 2001 (no. 59), and the Foundation Authority (Stiftelsestilsynet). Inclusion in the Foundation Register (Stiftelsesregisteret) is compulsory.

So-called savings bank foundations (sparebankstiftelse) have separate/additional legislation and are mainly regulated by the Financial Supervisory Authority.

=== Creation ===
When creating a foundation, the founder, who may be a physical person or a juridical, loses his right to dispose assets that are transferred to the foundation. This happens with immediate effect and irrevocably. However, the Foundation Law of 2001 presents a set of minimum formal demands that each creation document has to meet.

A foundation is normally required to have a minimum capital of 100,000 crowns when created.

=== Independence ===
Alike companies and organizations, a foundation is an independent juridical entity. Owning itself, a foundation is distinguishable from its otherwise similar couter-part, member-governed organisations. Neither external nor internal persons have partial ownership of a foundation's assets, and as such, they do not receive a foundation's profit. A foundation may itself be an owner, for example of companies. It may accept obligations and financial commitments, and it may be a subject to agreements and processes.

=== Organisation ===
Foundations are led by a board of directors and must follow the statute created by the founder(s).

Foundations have a wide specter of goals. Traditionally foundations were based to promote an idealistic goal, for instance of social, humanitarian, religious or educational nature. The activity of the foundation has then been to operate passive capital management and pay out return on capital. The foundation is also used for other types of activity or perform certain types of commercial activity. In later years it has been increasingly common for foundations to perform the idealist work themselves, to become holding companies within certain fields or as research organizations.

=== Scientific research ===
The most recent and broadest scientific research on Norwegian foundations is presented in the publication Stiftelser i det moderne Norge (2010) by Håkon Lorentzen and Line Dugstad of the Institute for Social Research.

== History ==
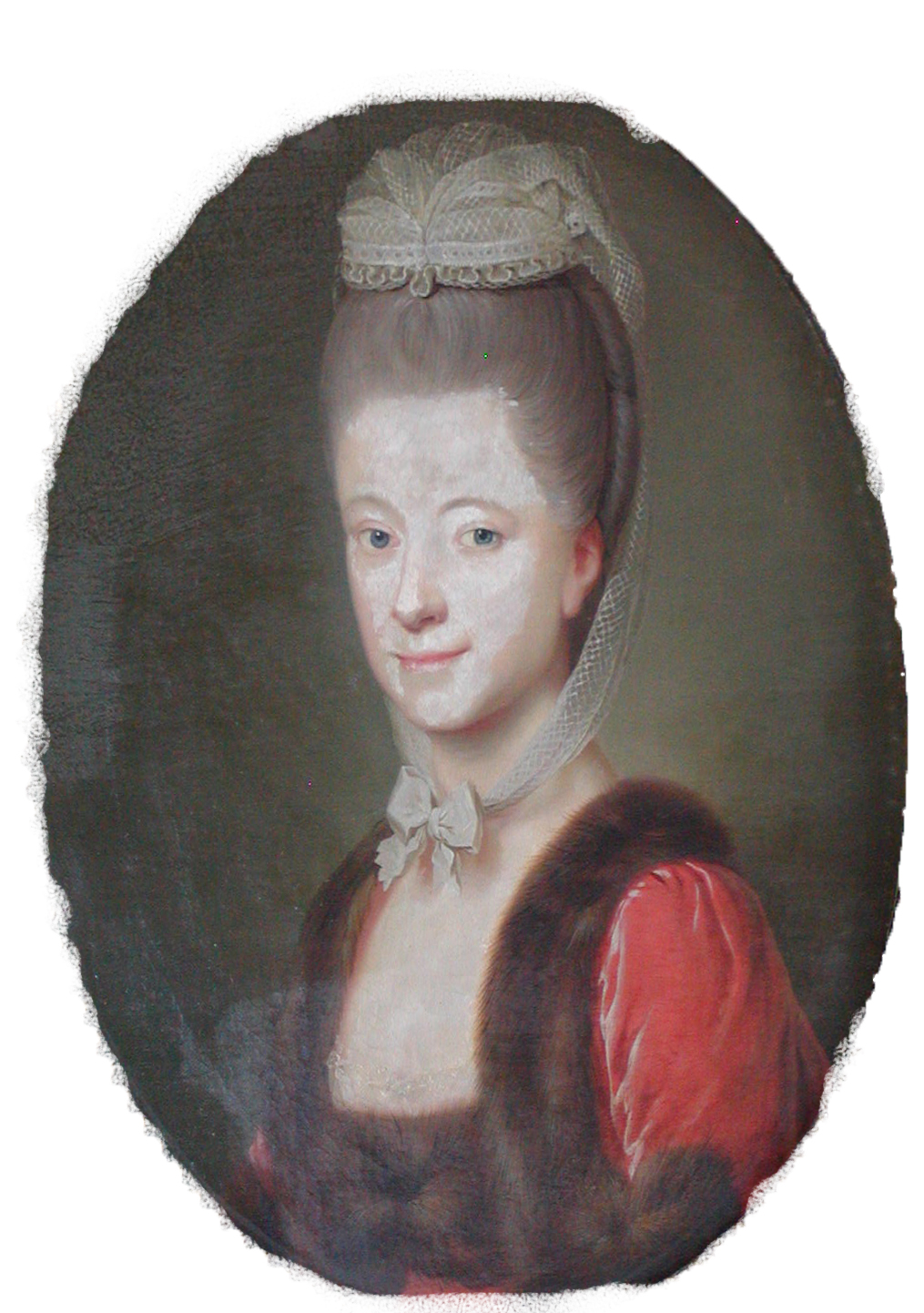
The Countess of Rosencrone (1753–1838) was the co-founder of several present foundations in Norway and Denmark.

=== Medieval foundations ===
The oldest still-existing foundations in Norway are Oslo Cathedral School of c. 1153 and Trondhjem Hospital of 1277.

Medieval foundations had a different character than modern ones; assets were deposited in (clerical) institutions rather than being institutions themselves. During Roman Catholicism in Norway, it was customary that the Church was given money and land in return for posthumous clerical services.

=== Modern foundations ===
Modern foundations originated along with settled estates (stamhus) and fee tails (fideikommiss) during absolutism in Norway, and members of the Dano-Norwegian nobility were among the first to establish such. In 1814, when the Constitution of the Kingdom of Norway was introduced, the foundation system was the only to survive; the creation of new settled estates and new fee tails was prohibited. However, based on later interpretations of section 108 of the Constitution, Norwegian authorities have limited the possibility to create foundations that have as purpose to make beneficiary relatives and kin of the founder. As laws in Norway may not be given retroactive force, there are still a handful of family foundations.

== Selection of notable foundations ==
- Olav Thon Foundation, the biggest in Norway
- Bellona Foundation (environmental organization)
- Dagsavisen (newspaper)
- Fritt Ord (free press idealism and media company holding)
- Kavli Foundation (owns the Kavli and Q-Melk food companies)
- Norwegian Computing Center (research)
- Norwegian School of Management (business school)
- Queen Maud's College of Early Childhood Education (pre-school teacher college)
- SINTEF (research)
- Sparebankstiftelsen DNB (savings bank foundation, owns close to 10% of DNB)
- Svalbardposten (newspaper)
- Zero Emission Resource Organisation (environmental organization)

See also Foundations based in Norway.

== Literature ==
- Lorentzen, Håkon, and Dugstad, Line: Stiftelser i det moderne Norge Oslo. Institutt for samfunnsforskning. (in Norwegian)
