= The White God =

1932 film

- Directed by: George Schnéevoigt
- Written by: George Schnéevoigt
- Starring: Paul Richter; Mona Mårtenson; Rudolf Klein-Rogge; Ada Kramm
- Production companies: Nordisk Film; Lothar Stark-Film
- Distributed by: Richard Goldstaub Tonfilmverleih
- Release date: 14 May 1932
- Running time: 78 minutes
- Countries: Denmark; Germany
- Language: German

The White God (German: Der weiße Gott) is a 1932 Danish-German adventure film directed by George Schnéevoigt and starring Paul Richter, Mona Mårtenson, and Rudolf Klein-Rogge. It premiered on 14 May 1932.

It is the German-language version of George Schnéevoigt's Danish–Norwegian film Eskimo (released 1930). There is also a French-language version.

== Cast ==
- Paul Richter as Jack Norton
- Mona Mårtenson as Ekalonk
- Rudolf Klein-Rogge as Mariak
- Ada Kramm as Anny
- Henki Kolstad as the cabin boy
- Knut Christian Langaard as the captain
- Paul Rehkopf
- Josef Dischner

== Bibliography ==
- Grange, William. Cultural Chronicle of the Weimar Republic. Scarecrow Press, 2008.
