= Olav Thon Foundation =

Norwegian foundation

The Olav Thon Foundation (Norwegian: Olav Thon Stiftelsen) is a Norwegian foundation and as such the biggest in Norway.

== Information ==
In accordance with its statutes, the Olav Thon Foundation's primary activity is to own the Olav Thon Group, including the hotel chain Thon Hotels. This makes the foundation a sizable business sector participant and one of the country's bigger real estate owners. The foundation's capital is approximately 25,4 billion crowns, of which 15 billions are so-called unattackable.

Additionally, the Olav Thon Foundation gives annual economic support to scientific projects within mathematics, natural science, and medicine. This includes up to ten annual prizes of 500,000 crowns each, given to Norwegian or foreign scientists, and an annual international prize of five million crowns.

The Olav Thon Foundation was established on 10 December 2013 in Oslo by Olav Thon.

== See also ==
- Olav Thon
- Olav Thon Group
- Foundations in Norway
