= Thon Hotels =

Norwegian-based hotel chain

- Company type: Private company
- Industry: Hospitality
- Founded: 1989
- Headquarters: Oslo, Norway
- Area served: Norway, Sweden, Denmark Belgium and the Netherlands
- Key people: Olav Thon, CEO
- Products: Hotels
- Number of employees: 137 (2026)
- Website: thonhotels.com

Thon Hotels (formerly known as Rainbow Hotels) is a Norwegian-based hotel chain. It is currently the 3rd largest hotel chain in Norway with 93 hotels in Norway, Belgium, Sweden, Denmark and the Netherlands.

== History ==
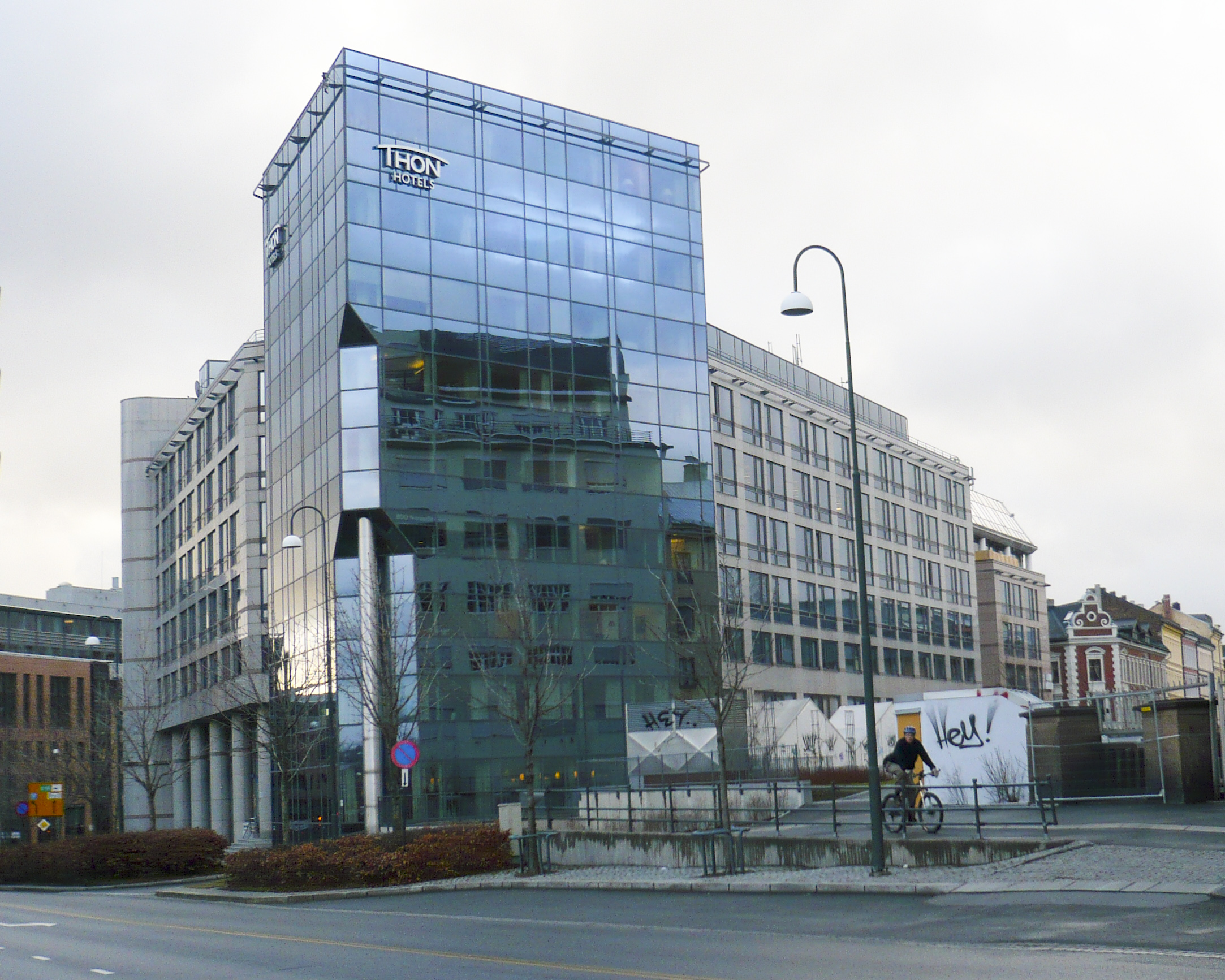
Thon Hotel Vika Atrium at Vika

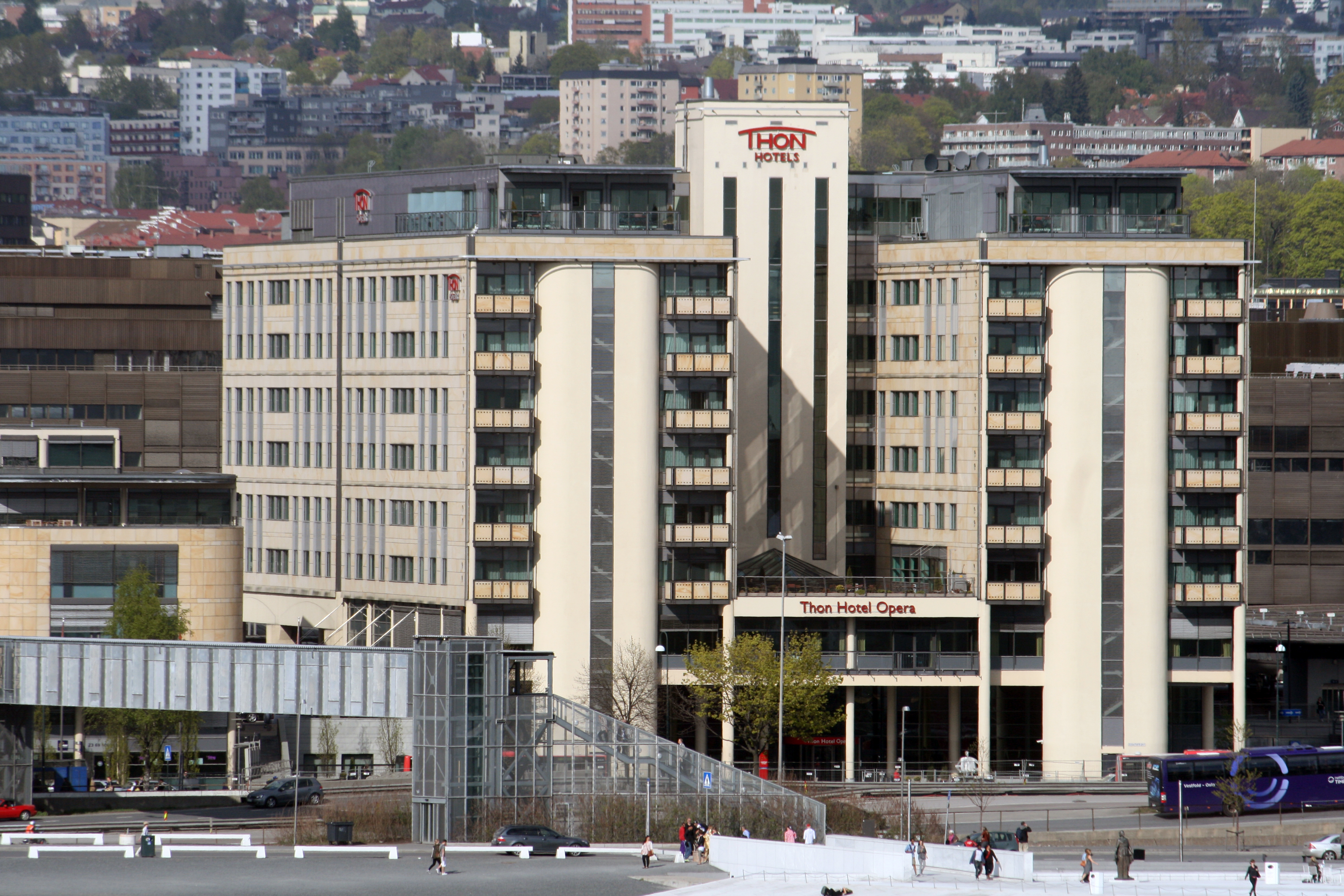
Thon Hotel Opera in Oslo

The Thon Hotel chain was established in 1989. Thon Hotels is part of the Olav Thon Group (Olav Thon Gruppen) which in turn is owned by the Olav Thon Foundation (Olav Thon Stiftelsen). The Norwegian philanthropist and property investor, Olav Thon bought Hotel Bristol in Oslo in 1974. In 1983 Thon bought his second hotel, before he founded Rainbow Hotel in 1989, which included 10 hotels. Over the next couple of decades, the hotel chain grew in numbers, and Thon extended his hotel business to Brussels in 1995 when he bought two hotels in the Belgium capital. Rainbow Hotels were rebranded to Thon Hotels in 2005.

== Controversy ==
In 2023, the company has been criticized for banning Pride flags during Pride Month. The main union representative at the company Ann Kristin Sletvold said she was "shocked" over the ban, and said it was "the wrong signal" only a year after a terrorist attack on Pride. After intense backlash, the company reversed its decision.
