= Knut Christian Langaard =

Norwegian athlete, landowner, dog breeder, and actor (1886–1965)

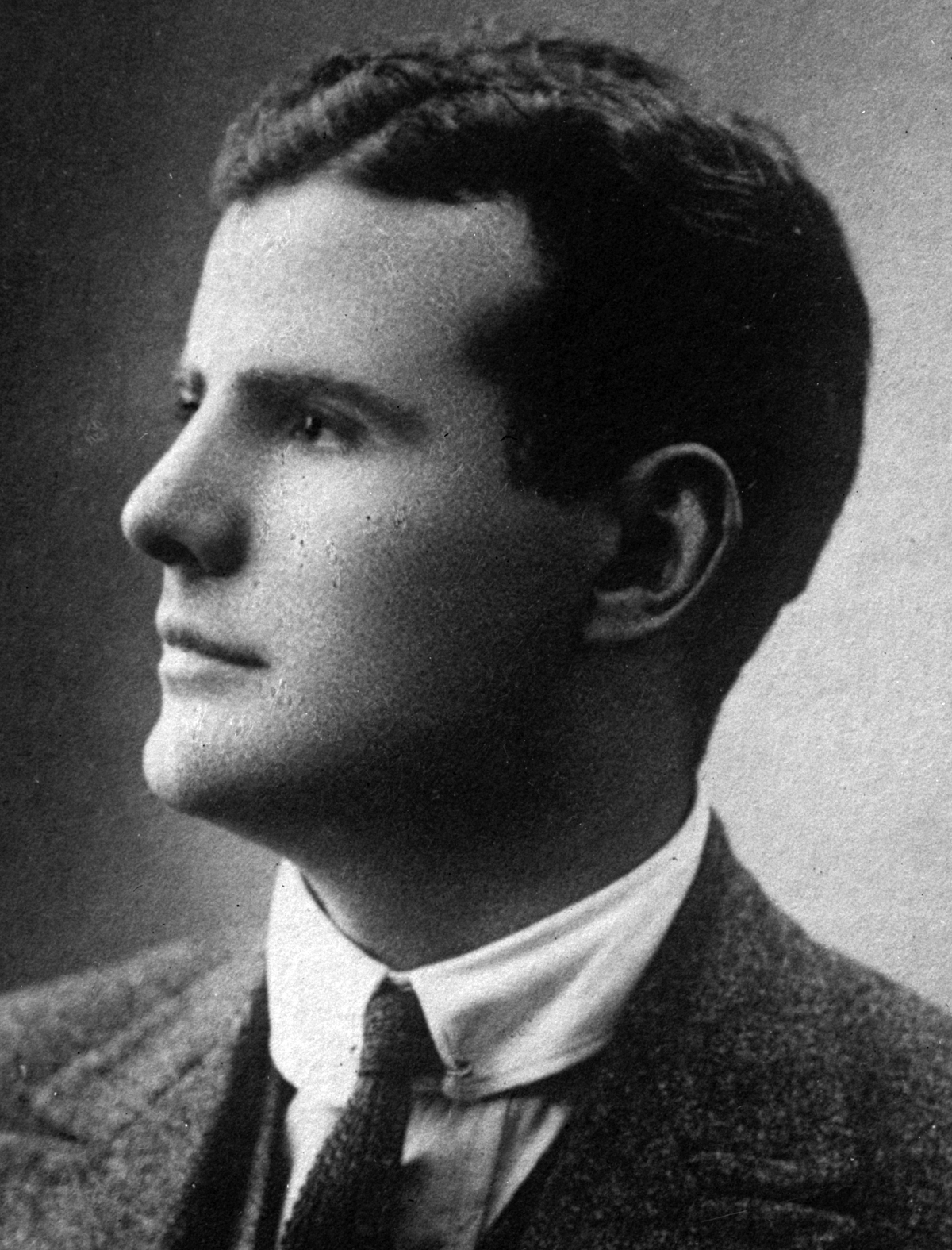
- Born: 2 February 1886; Kristiania (now Oslo), Norway
- Died: 1 May 1965 (aged 79); Oslo, Norway
- Occupations: Athlete, landowner, dog breeder, and actor
- Spouse: Linge Langård
- Father: Christian Langaard
- Relatives: Ivan Danielsson (brother-in-law)

Knut Christian Langaard (2 February 1886 – 1 May 1965) was a Norwegian athlete, Olympic competitor, landowner, dog breeder, and actor.

== Family ==
Langaard was the son of the businessman and patron of the arts Christian Langaard (1849–1922) and Ellevine Marie Langaard (1857–1890). His first marriage was to Elisif Fearnley (1889–1954), the daughter of the shipowner and industrialist Thomas Nicolay Fearnley, in the fall of 1910. In the next few years, the couple had the children Ella Marie (born 1911), Cecil (born 1912), Elisabeth (born 1914), Christian Knut (born 1915), and Elisif (born 1919). Langaard's only son, Christian K. Langaard, fought on the Allied side in the Second World War and fell during the campaign in North Africa in 1942. His first marriage ended in divorce. His second marriage was to the 23-year-old daughter of Didrik Cappelen: the actress Ingrid "Linge" Cappelen (1905–1981), an engagement announced in the summer of 1928. That marriage also ended in divorce, and his ex-wife Linge married the sculptor Knut Henrik Lund in 1959.

== Acting career ==
In 1929, Langaard made his theater debut in the Hans Bille Tour in the play The Spanish Fly by Franz Arnold and Ernst Bach. There he played the role of the lawyer Gerlach, in a debut that the newspaper Smaalenenes Social-Demokrat described as "quite successful": "It's just so strange to see him play a slightly faded copy of himself; he possesses in his private life a far fuller measure of all the freshness, gallows humor, and disdain for difficulties that precisely Gerlach's role is mixed together from." The following year Langaard toured with and played opposite his wife Linge Langård in the Kronstad–Langård Tour with the farce Guttebassen by Margaret Margo.

== Filmography ==
- 1930: Eskimo as the captain
- 1932: Der weiße Gott as the captain
