= Didrik Cappelen =

Norwegian jurist and politician (1900–1970)

- Born: 8 October 1900; Kviteseid Municipality, Norway
- Died: 27 August 1970 (aged 69)
- Occupations: Jurist and politician
- Relatives: Hans Cappelen (brother); Linge Langård (sister)

Didrik Cappelen (8 October 1900 – 27 August 1970) was a Norwegian jurist and politician.

He was born at Kviteseid Municipality in Telemark, Norway. He was a son of Supreme Court Attorney Didrik Cappelen (1873–1941) and Antoinette Therese von der Lippe (1876–1934). His brother was the jurist Hans Cappelen and his sister was the actress and singer Linge Langård.

During the occupation of Norway by Nazi Germany Cappelen worked together with his father, Carl P. Wright and Sverre Løberg in organizing resistance activities in the county of Telemark, Norway. Cappelen was arrested and in prison from 1940 to 1942 in Oslo, but escaped 30 January 1942. The escape was planned by his wife Gudrun née Knudsen (1910–1997), and assisted with great personal risk by Arne Qvenild, Kristian Aubert and Torolf Prytz junior.

Cappelen was appointed at the Norwegian Legation in Stockholm from 1942, and then at the Norwegian Ministry of Justice in exile in London. He served as prosecutor in Skien from 1946 to 1956 and as county judge from 1956 to 1970. He was elected as suppleant to the Parliament of Norway several times, and replaced Sveinung O. Flaaten after his death in 1962.
