= Hans Cappelen =

Norwegian jurist, businessperson and resistance fighter

- Born: 18 December 1903; Kviteseid Municipality, Norway
- Died: 21 October 1979 (aged 75)
- Occupations: jurist, businessperson and resistance fighter
- Awards: Order of St. Olav

Hans Cappelen (18 December 1903 – 21 October 1979) was a Norwegian jurist, businessperson and resistance fighter.

He was born in Kviteseid Municipality in Telemark county, Norway. He was a son of Supreme Court Attorney Didrik Cappelen (1873–1941) and Antoinette Therese von der Lippe (1876–1934). He was a brother of the jurist and politician Didrik Cappelen and the actress and singer Linge Langård.

He held a degree in law and worked in senior positions in the Philips Group and was a member of the board of Norsk AS Philips. Under the German occupation of Norway during World War II, he was arrested and sent to prison. He published the memoir Vi ga oss ikke (Nasjonalforlaget, 1945) and was a Norwegian witness in the Nuremberg trials in 1946. He was decorated Knight, First Class of the Order of St. Olav in 1970.
