= Signe Lund =

Norwegian composer and music teacher (1868–1950)

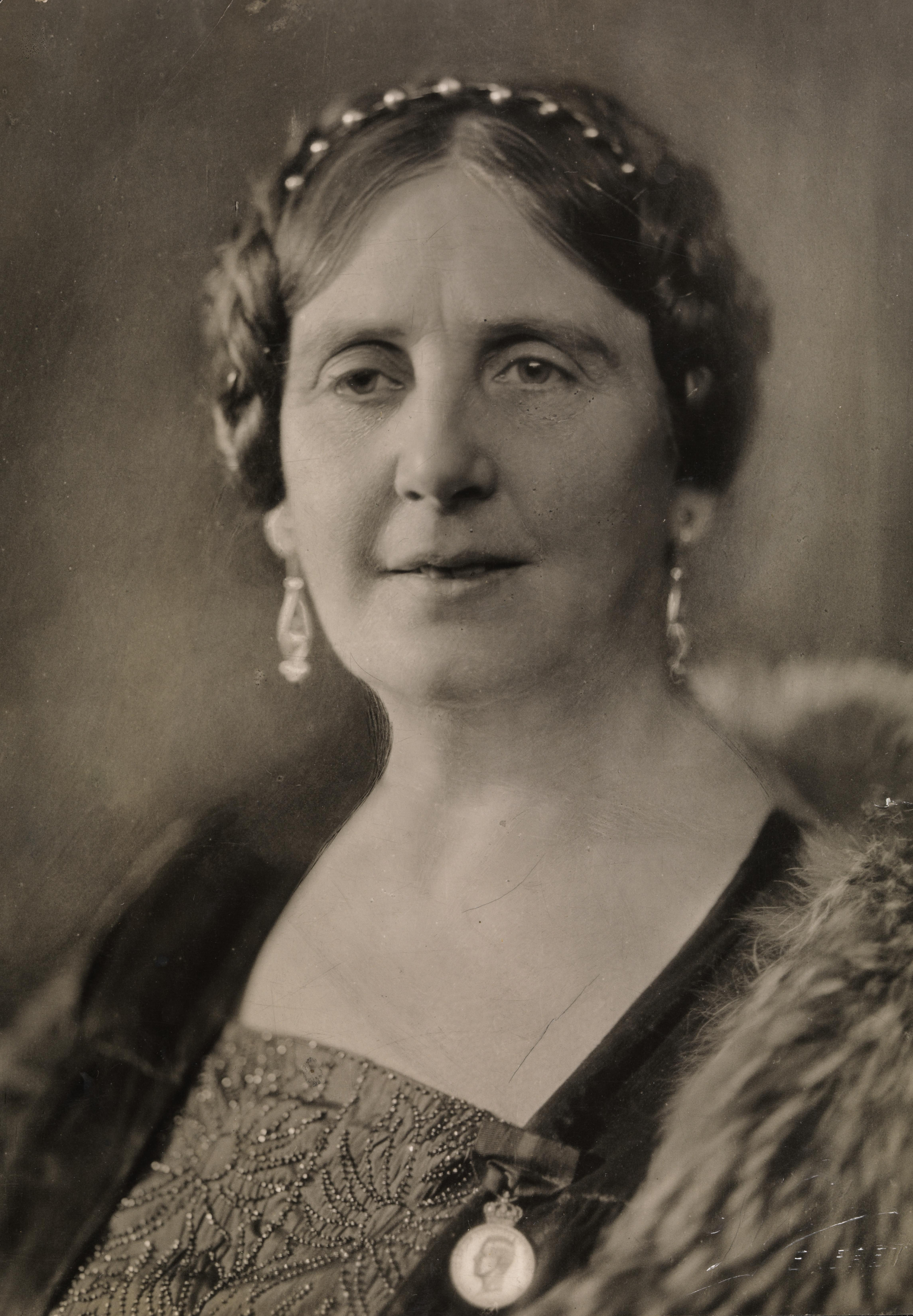
Signe Lund

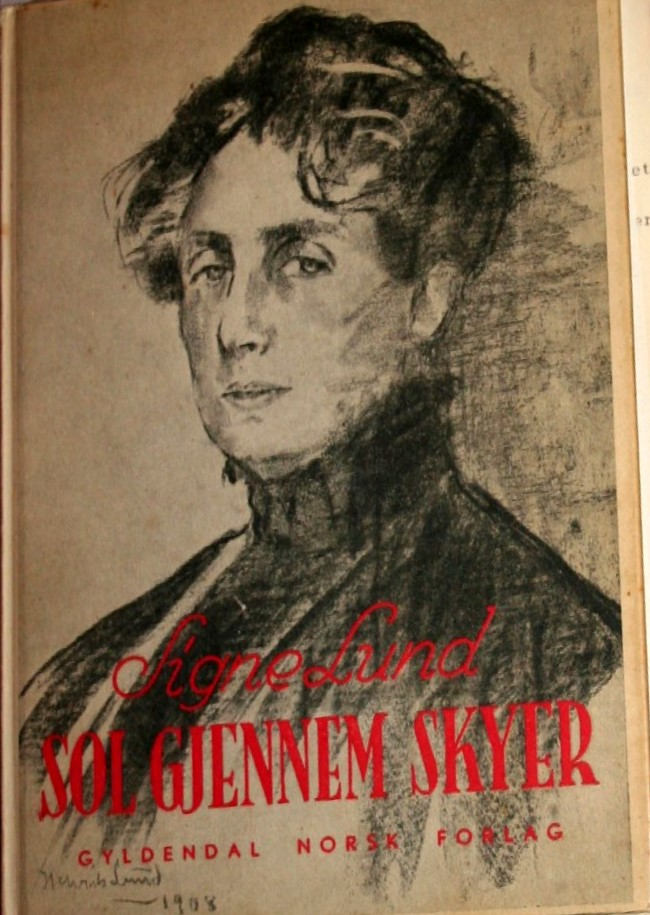
Signe Lund

Signe Lund-Skabo (15 April 1868 – 6 April 1950) was a Norwegian composer and music teacher.

== Biography ==
Signe Lund was born in Christiania (now Oslo), Norway. She was the daughter of Lieutenant Colonel Henrik Louis Bull Lund (1838–1891), and pianist Birgitte Theodora Carlsen (1843–1913), and was the sister of the artist Henrik Lund (1879–1935) and the aunt of the sculptor Knut Henrik Lund (1909-1991). She studied with Erika Nilsson, Per Winge and Iver Holter at the Oslo Conservatory of Music (Musikkonservatoriet i Oslo). After encouragement and praise from Edvard Grieg, she studied in Berlin with Wilhelm Berger and also in Copenhagen and Paris. After completing her studies she worked as a teacher in Norway. She married Jørgen Skabo and later French architect George Robards.

Lund emigrated to the United States about 1900 and took a position teaching at Mayville State Normal School in Mayville, North Dakota. She became active in the North Dakota Socialist party and Nonpartisan League and circulated petitions for the release of anti-war activist Kate Richards O'Hare from state prison in Missouri, which led to her dismissal from the Mayville teaching position.

She later worked in New York City and Chicago as a performer and lecturer until 1920. Lund received the King's Medal of Merit for contributions to strengthening of the relationship between the United States and Norway, but lost her U.S. citizenship after World War II and had already returned to Norway. She died in Oslo.

In 2024, The Hollywood Reporter ran an article discussing the similarities of Harold Arlen's Over the Rainbow to Lund's Concert Etude Opus 38.

== Works ==
Selected compositions include:

- Norske Smaastubber, Op. 15, for piano (1893)
- "Legende", from Quatre morceaux, Op. 16, for piano (1896)
- Wahrhaftig (Et sandt Ord), Op. 28 no. 1 (Text: Heinrich Heine)
- Valse de Concert, Op. 40, for piano four-hands (1914)
- The Road to France, march (also chorus), for orchestra (1917)
- Concerto for Piano and Orchestra, Op. 63 (1931)

== Autobiography ==
- Sol gjennem skyer, livserindringer (Gyldendal, Vol. I, 1944, and II, 1946) (reprinted lulu.com/spotlight/borrel/).
