= Sveinung O. Flaaten =

Norwegian politician

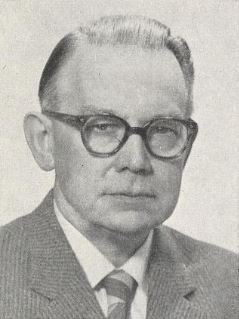
Sveinung O. Flaaten

Sveinung O. Flaaten (25 January 1898 – 11 June 1962) was a Norwegian politician for the Conservative Party.

He was born in Hitterdal Municipality (later spelled Heddal Municipality). He served as deputy mayor of Heddal Municipality in 1959–1960, and mayor that the municipality from 1960–1961.

He was elected to the Norwegian Parliament from Telemark in 1961, but died before one year of his term had passed. He was replaced by Didrik Cappelen.

Outside politics he worked as a school teacher and a farmer.
