= Trondhjem Hospital =

Charitable foundation in Trondheim, Norway

Coordinates: 63.4309°N 10.3838°E

Stiftelsen Trondhjems Hospital
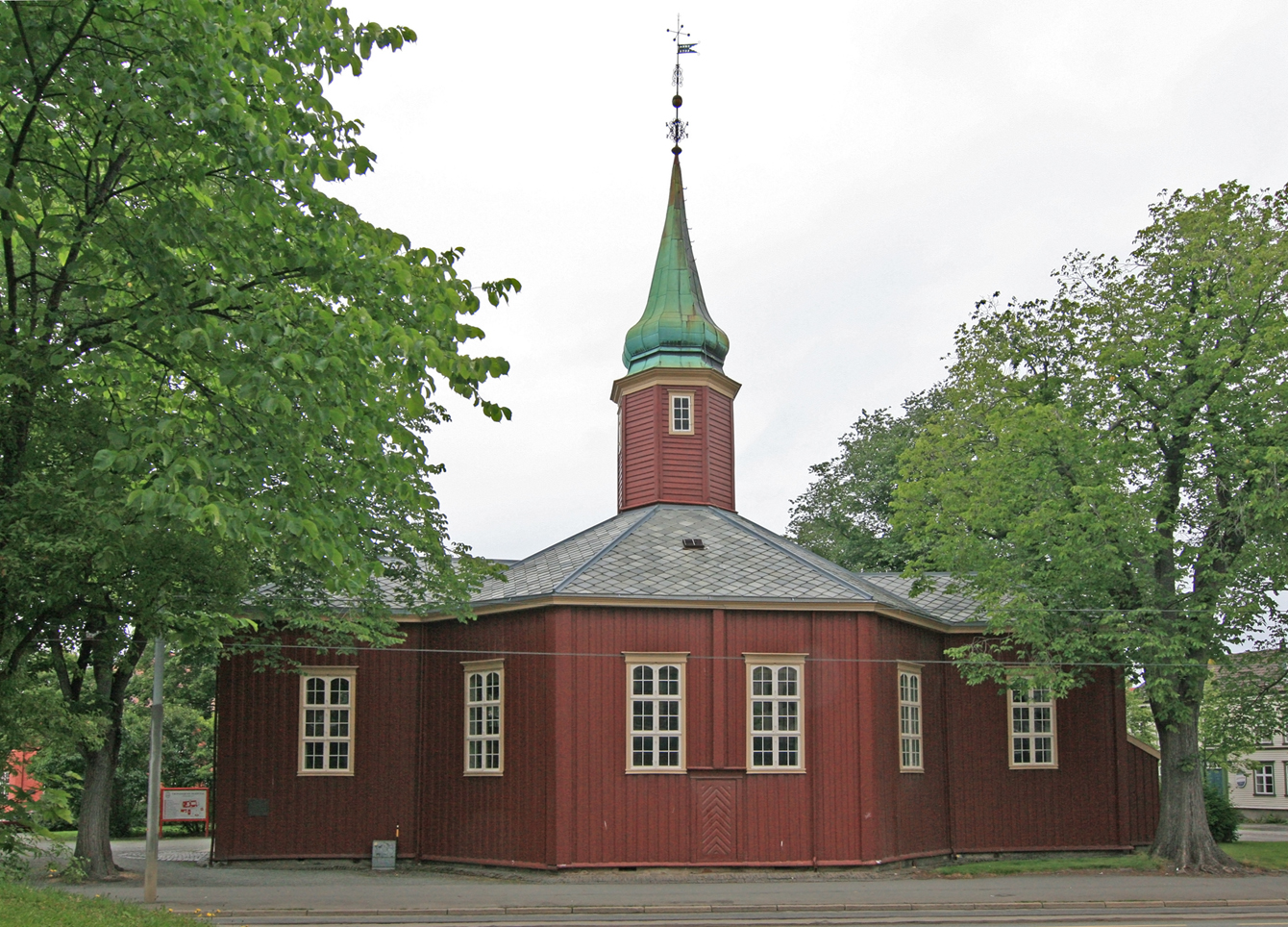
- Company type: Foundation
- Industry: residential nursing care activities
- Founded: 1277
- Headquarters: Trondheim, Norway
- Number of employees: 242 (2026)
- Website: Hospitalet.no

The Trondhjem Hospital (Norwegian: Trondhjems Hospital; colloquially: Hospitalet) is a charitable foundation in Trondheim, Norway.

The Hospital runs a nursing home, a home for demented persons, apartments for assisted living, and retirement apartments with attached home service. Its several buildings in Trondheim include the Hospital Church (Hospitalskirken).

Created in 1277 by Archbishop Jon Raude, the Hospital is one of Norway's oldest foundations.
