= Henrik Lund (painter) =

Norwegian artist (1879–1935)

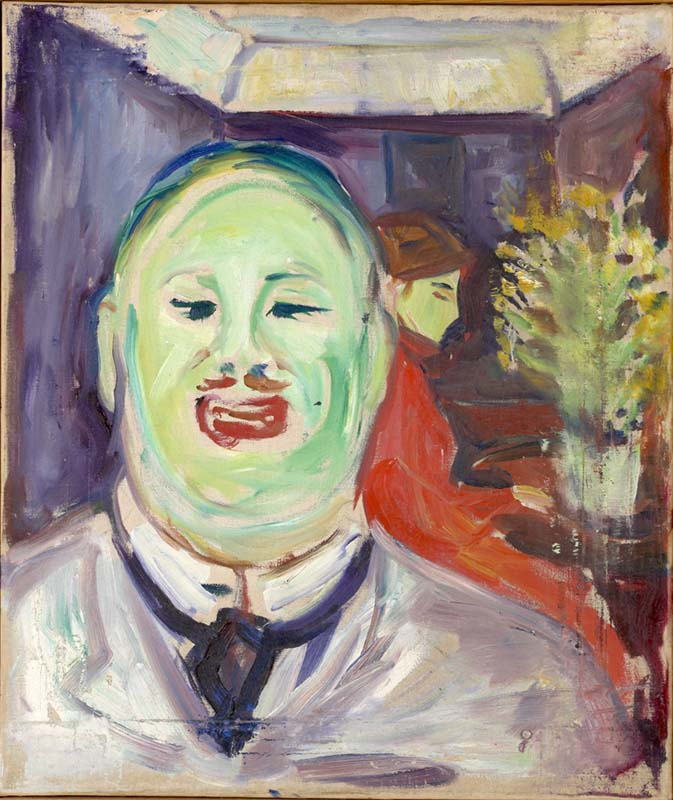
- Edvard Munch - Caricature Portrait of Henrik Lund
- Born: 8 September 1879
- Died: 23 December 1935 (aged 56)
- Occupation: Painter, graphic artist

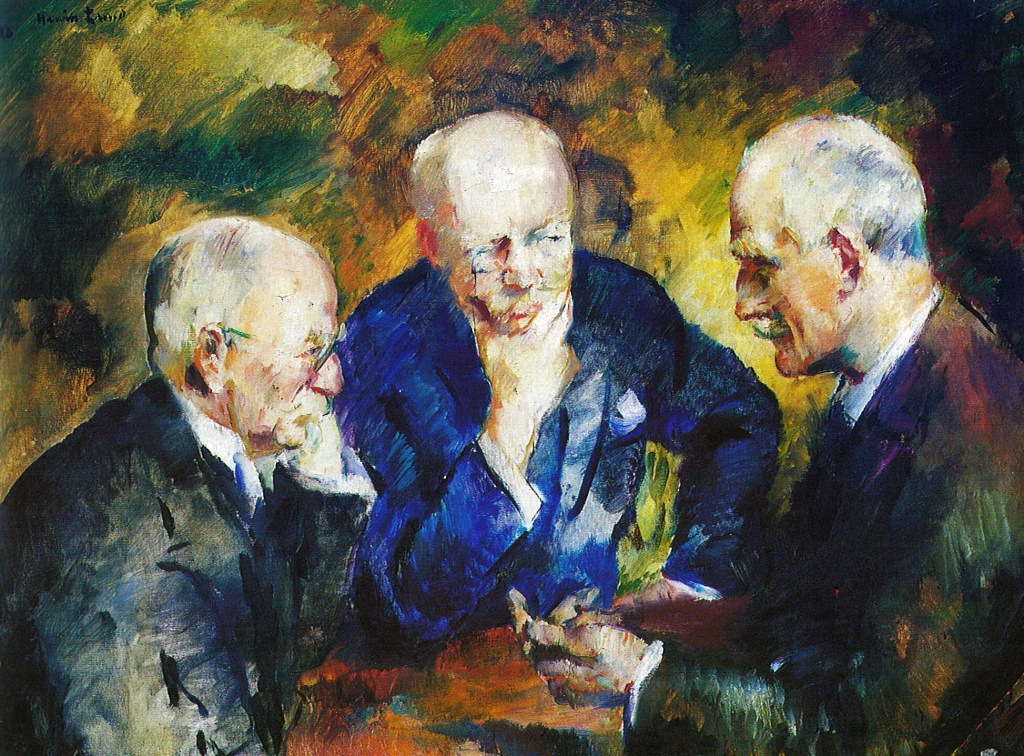
Christian Sinding, Gunnar Heiberg og Knut Hamsun (1926)

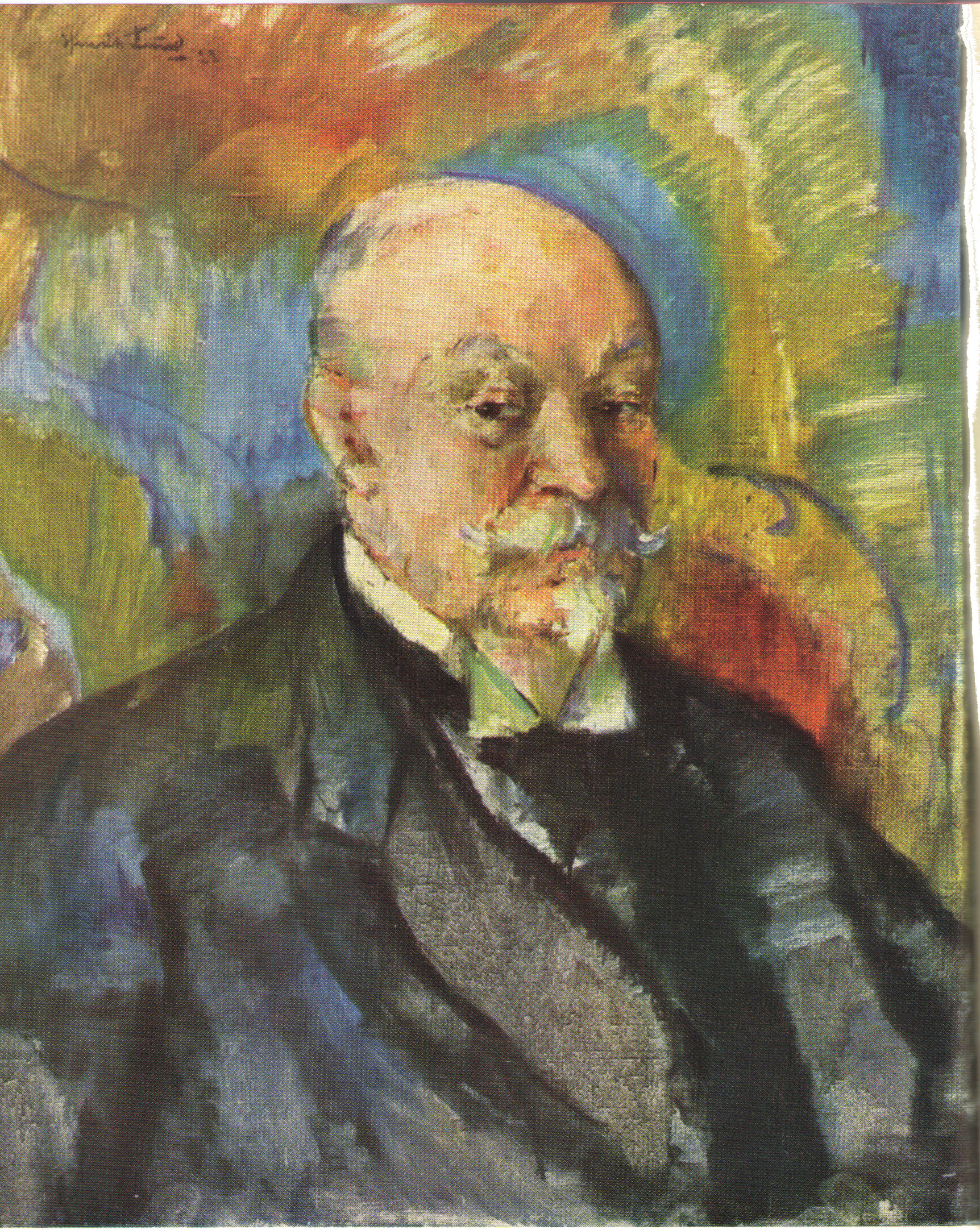
Nils Claus Ihlen before 1925

Henrik Louis Lund (8 September 1879 – 23 December 1935) was a Norwegian painter and graphic artist.

Lund was born in Bergen as a son of Lt.-Col. Henrik Louis Bull Lund (1838–1891) and pianist and composer Birgitte Theodora Carlsen (1843–1913). His sister was the composer Signe Lund. He spent much of his young days at sea and probably had a naval career in mind. However, he was not admitted to the Norwegian Naval Academy.

He moved to Kristiania, where he met painting student Per Deberitz, who was a student of Hans Gude and who probably turned Lund's interest to this profession. He was a pupil of Harriet Backer (1899), debuted the same year, and studied further with Johan Nordhagen (1903). Lund had his first exhibit in 1899 and his first Autumn Exhibit in 1901. He lived in Paris (1905, 1920–21) and exhibited in Berlin (1908). He lived in Copenhagen from 1904 to 1909 and broke through here. He held several notable exhibitions, including "The Six" in Berlin and Copenhagen in 1911.

His works can be found in the National Gallery of Norway in Oslo, which owns 13 of his pictures, in the Norwegian Parliament and inb the National Theatre, among others.

== Personal life ==
His sister was the composer and pianist Signe Lund (1868–1950). In 1900, he married Gunbjør Olsen (1880–1965), and they were the parents of the sculptor Knut Henrik Lund (1909–1991). He was the father-in-law of the art historian Johan Henrik Langaard (1899–1988). He died on 23 December 1935 in Oslo.
