= Borghild Langaard =

Norwegian operatic soprano

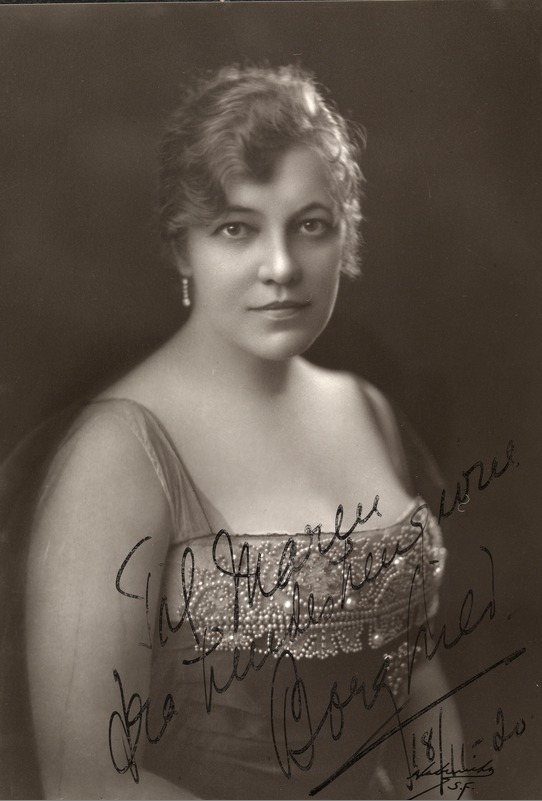
- Borghild Bryhn (1920)
- Born: Borghild Bryhn; July 23, 1883; Kongsvinger, Norway
- Died: November 20, 1939 (aged 56); Oslo, Norway
- Other names: Borghild Bryhn Langaard; Borghild Lindvig; Borghild Brunelli
- Spouses: Mads Conrad Langaard (married 1909-1916); Bjarne Lindvig (married 1918-?); Ermanno Brunelli (married 1930-?)

Borghild Bryhn Langaard, née Bryhn (23 July 1883 – 20 November 1939) was a Norwegian operatic soprano.

== Biography ==
Borghild Bryhn was born on 23 July 1883 in Kongsvinger. She died on 20 November 1939 in Oslo.

== Career ==
Borghild Bryhn studied with Gina Oselio and Nina Grieg. Her public debut was in 1906 at a concert in Kristiania (called Oslo after 1925) featuring songs by Grieg, accompanied on piano by the composer, Edvard Grieg, himself.

Her operatic debut was in 1907 in Kristiania in the opera Sjømandsbruden by Sigwardt Aspestrand. In 1908, at Royal Opera House, Covent Garden, she sang the role of Brünnhilde in Hans Richter and Percy Pitt's English language production of Wagner's Der Ring des Nibelungen

In the period 1908-1916, Borghild Bryhn Langaard made several gramophone recordings, including art songs by Grieg, and excerpts from her operatic repertoire.

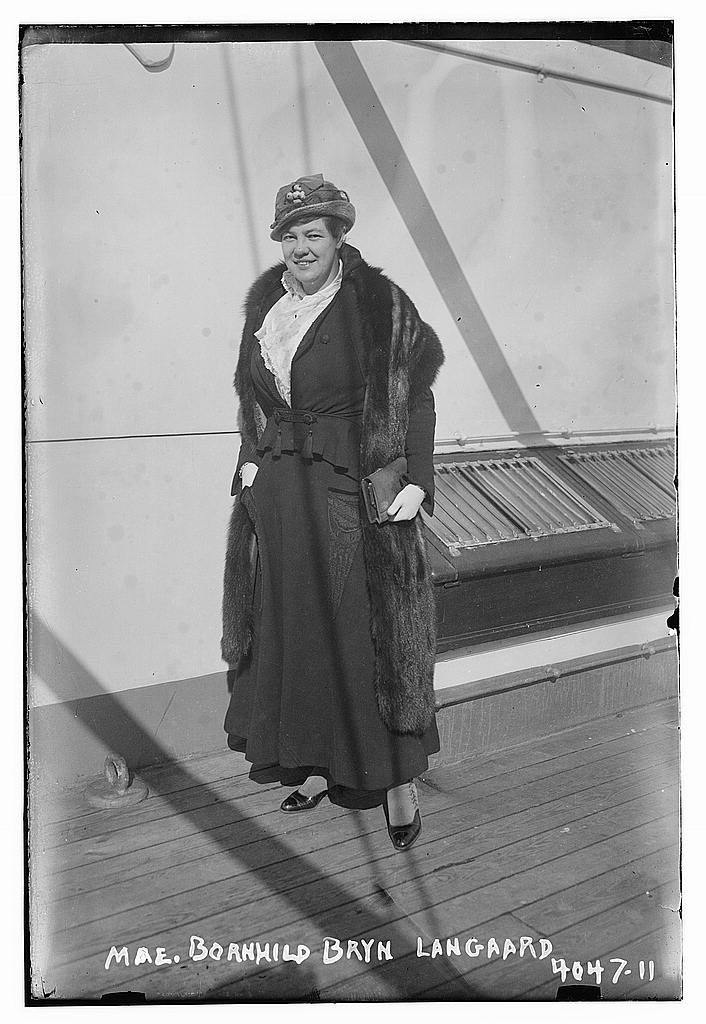
Borghild Bryhn Langaard in 1916

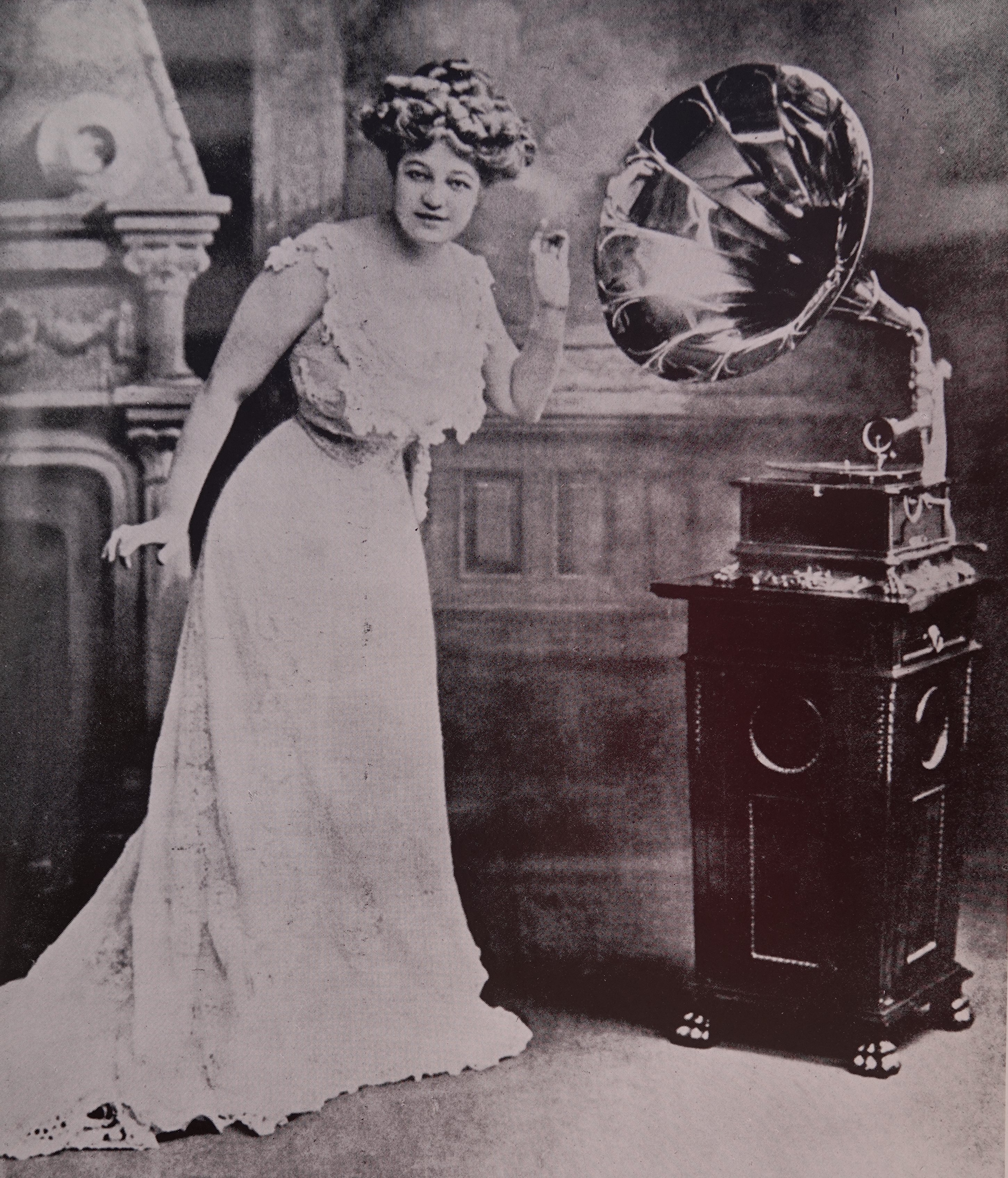
Appearing in a 1908 Pathéphone commercial.
