= Knut Henrik Lund =

Norwegian sculptor (1909–1991)

- Born: July 20, 1909; Aurskog, Norway
- Died: May 15, 1991 (aged 85); Oslo, Norway
- Occupation: Sculptor
- Spouse(s): Irene Una Rasmussen (1937); Linge Langård (1959)
- Father: Henrik Lund
- Relatives: Signe Lund

Knut Henrik Lund (July 20, 1909 – May 15, 1991) was a Norwegian sculptor known for his portrait busts.

== Career ==
Lund originally worked in shipping, a job he held until 1940. Before the Second World War, he was also a pupil of Wilhelm Rasmussen. During the war he fled to Sweden, and then from 1945 to 1948 he was at the Royal Swedish Academy of Fine Arts in Stockholm. The rest of his life he worked as a sculptor.

== Family ==
Lund was the son of the painter Henrik Lund and Gunbjør Olsen, and he was the nephew of the composer Signe Lund. He married Irene Una Rasmussen in 1937, and in 1959 he married the actress Linge Langård.

== Works ==
Lund's busts or portrait heads included the following:

- Rolf Stranger, at Høyres Hus in Oslo (unveiled 1968)
- Johan Hjort, director of the Norwegian Institute of Marine Research in Bergen (1968)
- Georg Ossian Sars, director of the Norwegian Institute of Marine Research in Bergen (1968)
- Gunnar Kristian Lindeman, director of Vinmonopolet at Hasle in Oslo (1969)
- Rolf Stranger, at Norway Trade Fair at Sjølyst in Oslo (1980)
- Ludvig G. Braathen, founder and CEO of Braathens in Oslo (1971)
- Hans Christian Henriksen, director of the Norwegian America Line (1971)

He also created the statue Blomsterpiken (The Flower Girl) at Molde Airport (1973)
