= Eskimo (1930 film) =

1930 film

- Directed by: George Schnéevoigt
- Written by: Helge Bangsted; Laurids Skands
- Based on: Ejnar Mikkelsen's novel John Dale
- Produced by: Aud Egede-Nissen
- Starring: Mona Mårtenson; Paul Richter; Ada Kramm; Knut Christian Langaard; Finn Bernhoft; Henki Kolstad; Tryggve Larssen; Haakon Hjelde; Adam Poulsen; Josef Dischner; Aud Egede-Nissen; Rudolf Klein-Rogge; Paul Rehkopf; Ada Schramm
- Cinematography: Valdemar Christensen
- Edited by: George Schnéevoigt
- Music by: Teddy Petersen
- Distributed by: Skandinavisk Talefilm
- Release date: October 13, 1930
- Running time: 92 minutes
- Country: Norway
- Language: Norwegian

Eskimo is a Norwegian–Danish adventure and drama film from 1930 directed by George Schnéevoigt. It starred Mona Mårtenson, Paul Richter, and Henki Kolstad, for whom it was his film debut at age 14. Had it not been for the fact that Denmark was also involved in the production, Eskimo would have been considered the first feature-length Norwegian sound film (rather than Den store barnedåpen from 1931). The language in the film is Norwegian.

== Plot ==
Jack Norton is a gambler, and his father often lends him money to pay off his gambling debts. Finally, his father's patience runs out. He refuses to lend him more money, and he no longer wants to acknowledge Jack as his son. In desperation, Jack takes a motorboat and sails to sea. His boat sinks, but he is picked up by a fishing vessel on its way to the Arctic Ocean. The captain is a brutal man, and both he and the crew treat Jack badly. The only exception is the cabin boy Jimmy, who eventually becomes close friends with Jack. When the captain beats Jimmy one day, Jack comes to his rescue. But in the conflict that follows, Jimmy is shot and killed.

Jack can no longer bear to be on the ship after this, and one night he escapes by jumping onto a large ice floe. He remains on the ice floe for several days and nights, before he finally arrives exhausted in Greenland. He is kindly received by the Eskimos there, and the young beautiful girl Ekaluk falls in love with him. At first, Jack is not particularly interested in her, but, when he falls ill with scurvy and is cared for by her, he falls in love. He intends to return home with a merchant ship that has arrived at the island. But he understands that he cannot manage without Ekaluk, and therefore he considers staying with the Eskimos.

== Cast ==
- Mona Mårtenson as Eukaluk
- Paul Richter as Jack Norton
- Ada Kramm as Annie
- Knut Christian Langaard as the captain
- Finn Bernhoft as the mate
- Henki Kolstad as Jimmy, the cabin boy
- Tryggve Larssen as Sulurak, Eukaluk's father
- Haakon Hjelde as Majrak, a great hunter
- Adam Poulsen as the reader of the prologue (voice)
- Josef Dischner
- Aud Egede-Nissen as Luder
- Rudolf Klein-Rogge as Mariak
- Paul Rehkopf
- Ada Schramm
