= Mads Langaard =

Norwegian brewer and industrialist

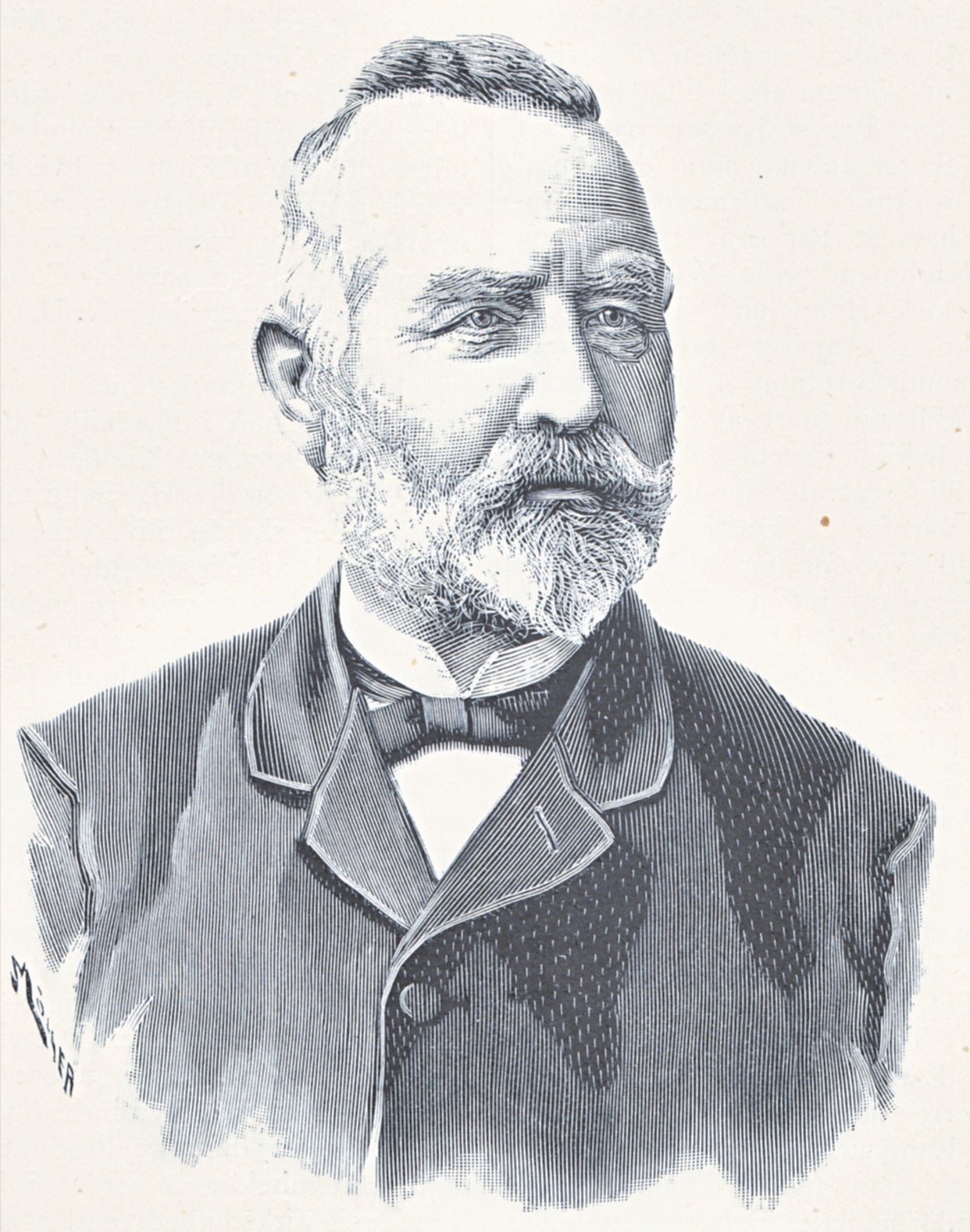
- Born: 3 May 1815; Lillesand, Norway
- Died: 23 March 1891 (aged 75)
- Occupations: Brewer; Industrialist
- Children: Christian Langaard
- Relatives: Conrad Langaard (brother)

Mads Ellef Langaard (3 May 1815 – 23 March 1891) was a Norwegian brewery owner and industrialist. He was the founder of the brewery Frydenlunds bryggeri, now a division of Ringnes.

== Personal life ==
Langaard was born at Lillesand in Nedenes county, Norway to sea captain Mads Christian Langaard (1774–1854) and his wife, Ellevine Ellefsen (1792–1874). He was a brother of tobacco manufacturer Conrad Langaard and father of Christian Langaard, who succeeded in the management of Frydenlund Brewery.

== Career ==
In 1841, he moved to Christiania (now Oslo). In 1850 he established Langaard & Dietrichson together with C. A. Dietrichson. The partnership operated in export and import. In 1859, Langaard founded the brewery Frydenlund Bryggeri in Christiania together with three partners; Abraham Hesselberg, Justus Heinrich Schwensen and Knud Knudsen. After some startup problems, the brewery became an economic success, and Langaard started other companies, and was involved in mining, forestry and shipping. He established Follum Tresliperi in 1873 and Lillehammer Dampsag og Høvleri in 1876.

He was decorated Knight of the Order of St. Olav in 1887. Mads Langaard died during 1891 and was buried on Vår Frelsers gravlund in Oslo.
