= Christian Langaard =

Norwegian industrialist

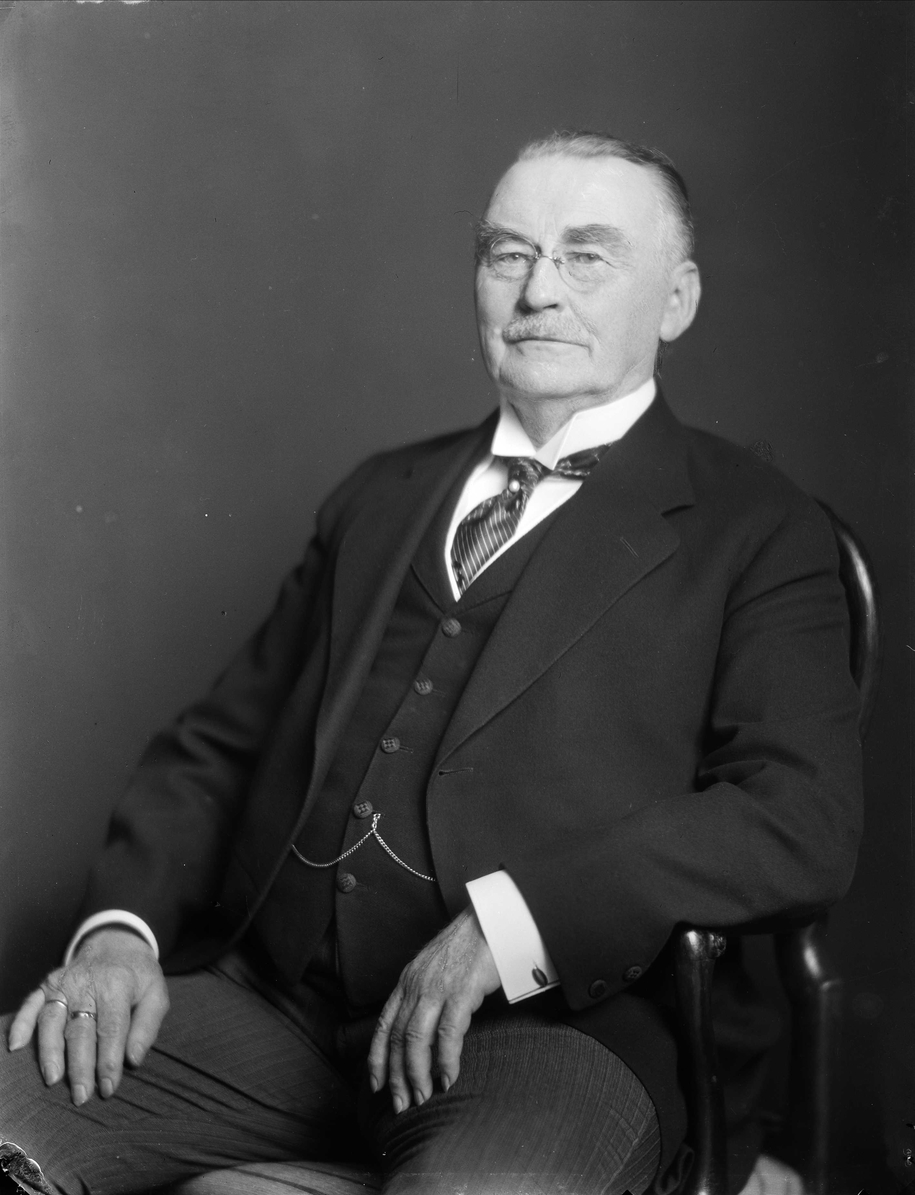
- Langaard in 1920
- Born: 5 August 1849; Christiania, Norway
- Died: 31 August 1922 (aged 73)
- Occupations: Industrialist and art collector
- Children: Knut Christian Langaard
- Parent: Mads Langaard
- Relatives: Ivan Danielsson (son-in-law)
- Awards: Order of St. Olav

Christian Langaard (5 August 1849 – 31 August 1922) was a Norwegian industrialist and art collector. He was born in Christiania as a son of brewery owner Mads Langaard and Lovise Jakobine Knudsen. He was married to Ellevine Ellefsen and was the father of Knut Christian Langaard and Johan Henrik Langaard.

Langaard assumed various leading positions in the brewery Frydenlund Bryggeri in Christiania. He was a dedicated art collector, and his collection was eventually donated to the National Gallery of Norway, the Norwegian Museum of Decorative Arts and Design and the Norwegian Museum of Cultural History. He was decorated Knight, First Class of the Order of St. Olav in 1904 and Commander, First Class in 1914.
