= Olav Thon =

Norwegian businessman (1923)

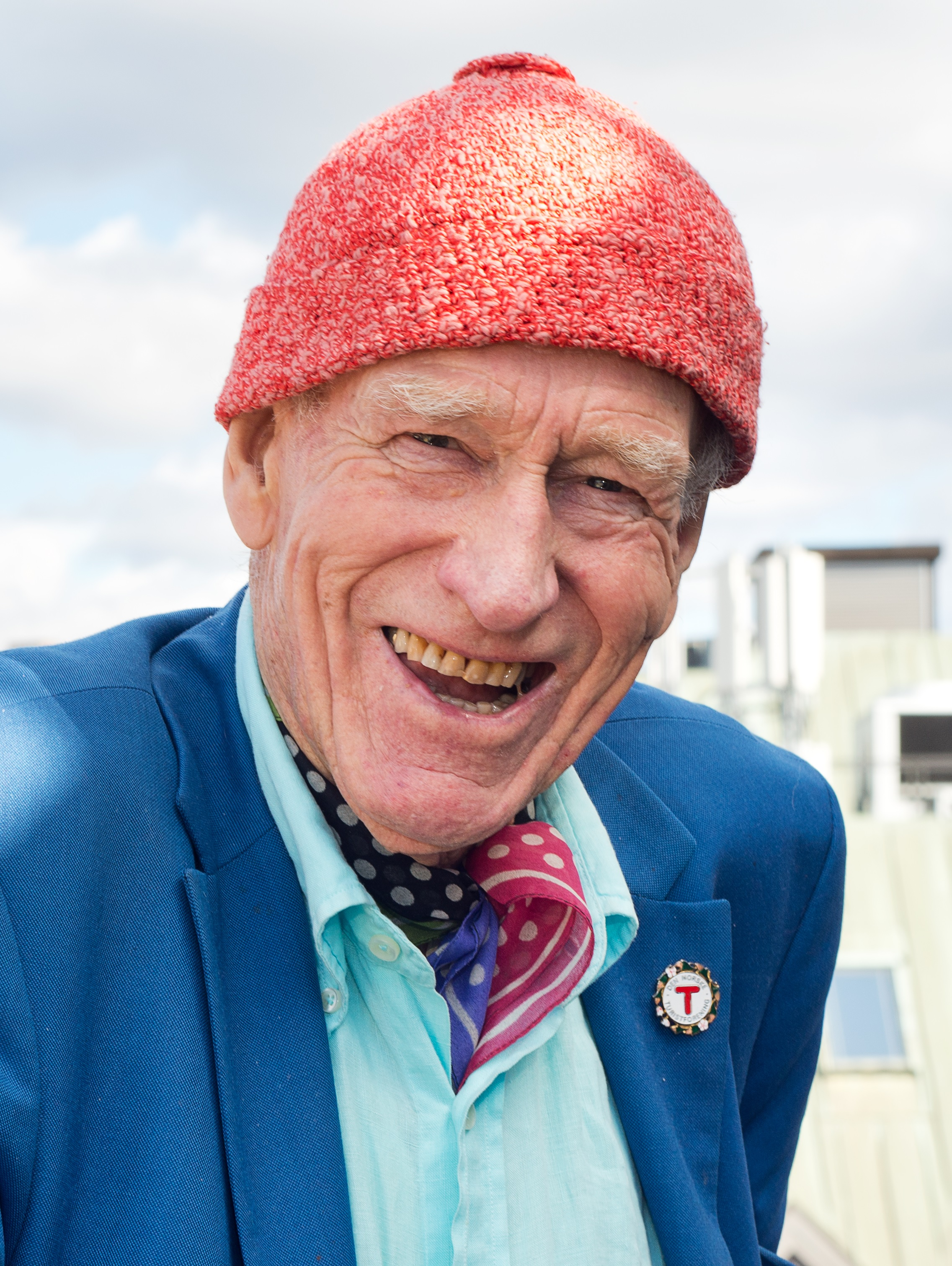
- Thon in 2013
- Born: 29 June 1923; Ål, Buskerud, Norway
- Occupation: Real estate developer
- Title: Chairman of Olav Thon Gruppen
- Spouses: Inger-Johanne Thon (died 2018) (Note: The couple were separated for several years by the time of her death.); Sissel Berdal Haga (m. 2019)

Olav Thon (29 June 1923 – 16 November 2024) was a Norwegian real estate developer. His Olav Thon Group is Norway's largest private real estate company, with 450 properties, including 60 hotels. Thon began his career by selling animal fur shortly before World War II in Oslo, and he opened his first restaurant in 1966.

== Early life ==
Thon was born on 29 June 1923 in Ål, Hallingdal, Norway. His parents were businessman Sevat Embrikson and Margit Engebretsdatter Dok. Thon started his business career as a boy at home on the family farm in Ål, where he farmed fur animals and bought and sold skins from foxes, squirrels and rabbits.

At the age of 8, Thon started ordering a supply of Christmas cards from a mail-order catalog and selling them to his neighbors. At the age of 16, Thon moved to Oslo, and in 1941, he established his own fur shop. Originally he had wanted to study medicine but the outbreak of World War II made it harder for him to travel abroad. Instead, he began to focus on the fur business. After the war, he studied English in London.

== Business career ==
Thon bought his first building in 1951 and opened his first restaurant in 1966. His company owns a total of 450 properties in Norway, including shopping malls, office buildings, retail stores, and hotels. His principal holdings are the private companies Stormgård AS and Thongård AS, in addition to a major stake in the publicly traded company Olav Thon Eiendomsselskap ASA.

In 1952, Thon traveled to Iceland on a business trip, however when he returned in 1953, he was arrested and detained on suspicion of customs fraud. He was later sentenced to pay a fine of NOK 50,000 and a one-year suspended sentence.

Besides his hotel and real estate investments, in 1992, Thon acquired Unger Fabrikker AS. Unger Fabrikker AS is a Fredrikstad based chemical manufacturer with a focus of anionic surfactants.

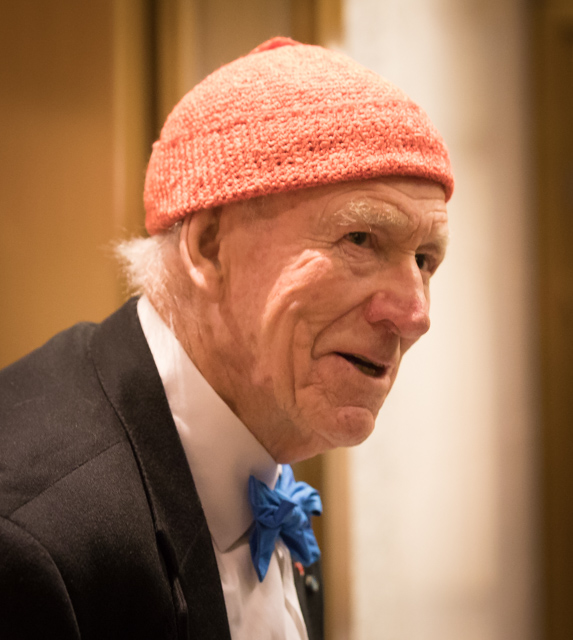
Thon in 2017

In 2007, Thon was listed with a fortune of NOK 20.8 billion, which made him Norway's 2nd richest person.

Thon's authorized biography, Olav Thon: Billionaire in a Parka, was written by Hallgrim Berg, a Norwegian politician and a folk musician; a translated version was published in English in October 2009.

=== Trust ===
In an article in the Norwegian newspaper Dagens Næringsliv on 10 September 2008, Thon's solicitor, John Christian Elden, announced that Thon intended to give away his entire fortune through the establishment of an independent foundation that focuses on the medical sciences.

On 10 December 2013 Thon announced the decision for the entire 71.9% stake in his real estate company Olav Thon Eiendomsselskap ASA to give for charity trust of his own. Therefore, later, in February 2014, his personal assets were estimated around US$1 billion.

Thon had no heirs at the time of his death.

== Personal life ==
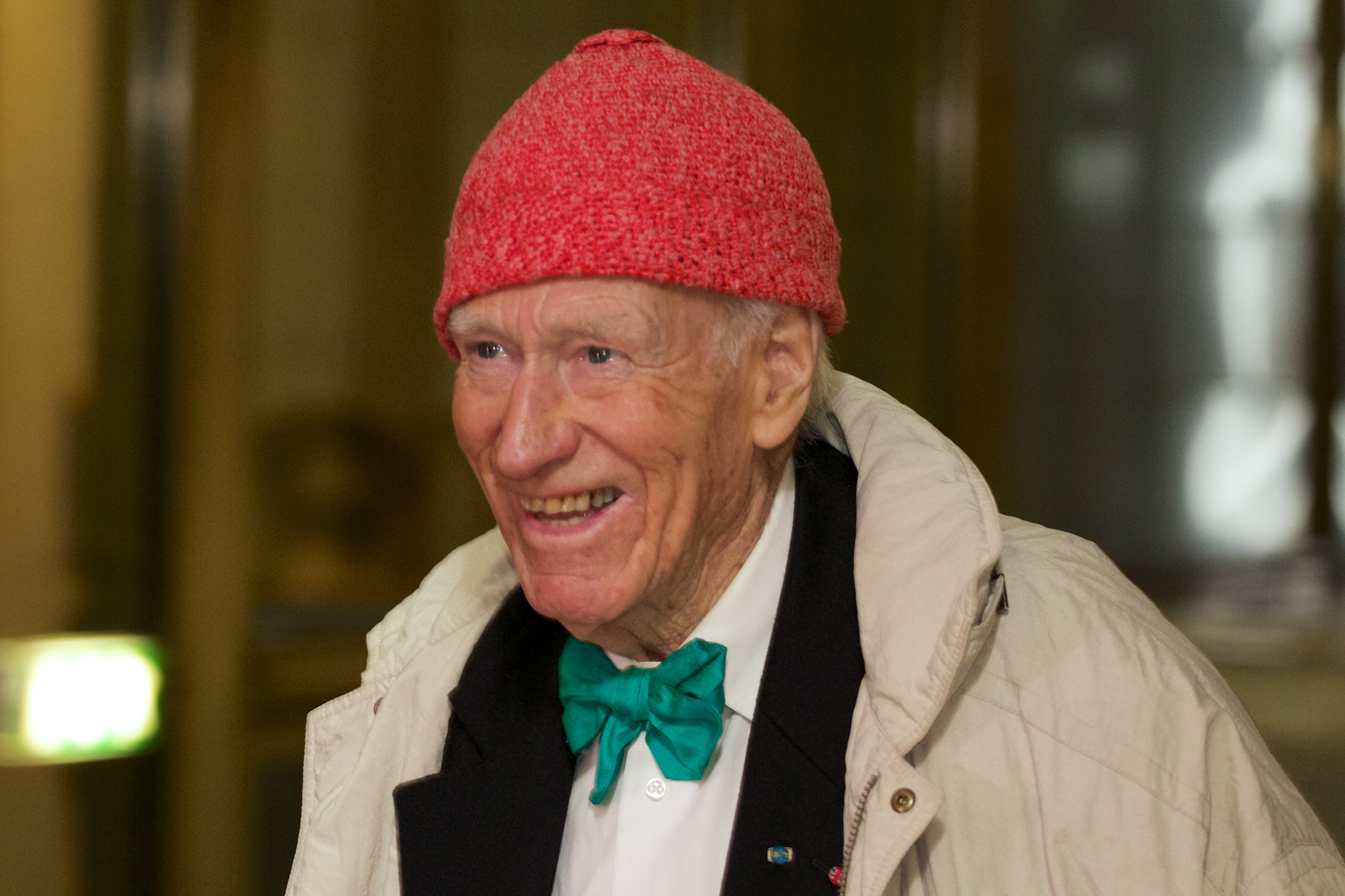
Thon in 2014

Thon lived just outside Oslo, in Sollihøgda, Hole municipality. Thon was a Christian and was married; he did not have any children. He enjoyed various outdoor activities and was an honorary member of the Norwegian Trekking Association. Thon was quoted as saying he was "proud of his success, and his large tax bill, which he says he is glad to pay".

Thon was appointed honorary doctorate at Karlstad University in 2013.

Thon was married to Inger-Johanne Thon (1919–2018) until her death. Although he lived with his partner, Sissel Berdal Haga (born 1940), for over 30 years, he did not divorce his wife, as she was suffering from Alzheimer's disease. Thon eventually married Berdal Haga on 21 June 2019.

On 29 June 2023, Thon turned 100.

Thon died on 16 November 2024, at the age of 101. After his death, Prime Minister Jonas Gahr Støre called Thon a "unique businessman" who "never forgot his roots to the local Norwegian community".
