= Proposed United States acquisition of Greenland =

A map showing the locations of the United States (blue) and Greenland (red)

North polar projection map

Greenland geography

The United States has discussed obtaining Greenland from Denmark since the 19th century. There were talks within the US federal government about purchasing Greenland in 1867, advocated by Secretary of State William H. Seward, and again in 1910. However, in 1916, the United States proclaimed their recognition of Danish sovereignty over all Greenland as a condition for their purchase of the Virgin Islands in the Treaty of the Danish West Indies. Since World War II, the US has had at least one military base in Greenland. In 1946, the US secretly offered to buy Greenland, but it was rejected by Denmark. Since 1949, Greenland has been under the protection of NATO, of which the US and Denmark are both members. Nevertheless, the Joint Chiefs of Staff proposed acquiring the island in 1955. In the 21st century, Donald Trump proposed acquisition of Greenland during his presidency.

The US has long seen Greenland as vital for the defense of its mainland, and former war plans listed Greenland as one of the territories the US would seize and fortify in a hypothetical war. During World War II, the US invoked its Monroe Doctrine and occupied Greenland to prevent use by Germany following the German occupation of Denmark. The US military remained in Greenland after the war, and by 1948 Denmark abandoned attempts to persuade the US to leave. The following year, both countries became NATO members. A 1951 treaty gave the US a significant role in Greenland's defense and allowed it to have bases there. The US eventually shut all of its bases except for Thule Air Base (now Pituffik Space Base). While the US military often takes part in NATO exercises in Greenlandic waters, it has been warned that a US annexation of Greenland would effectively end NATO. Another oft-speculated motive for US acquisition of Greenland is to gain control of its natural resources.

In 2019, during his first presidency, Trump expressed his desire for the US to purchase Greenland; it was turned down and described as "absurd" by Danish prime minister Mette Frederiksen. During his second presidency, since 2025, Trump has advocated American expansionism and has sought US control of Greenland. Following Danish refusals to sell the country, Trump continues to discuss U.S. annexation of Greenland, which would break international law. This triggered the Greenland crisis. Greenlandic and Danish authorities have publicly asserted Greenland's right to self-determination and stated that Greenland is "not for sale". The Greenlandic government stated that they choose the Danish Realm over the United States, 85% of Greenlanders oppose an American takeover, and many Danes see the historical ties with Greenland as an integral part of Danish national identity.

== Overview of Greenland ==
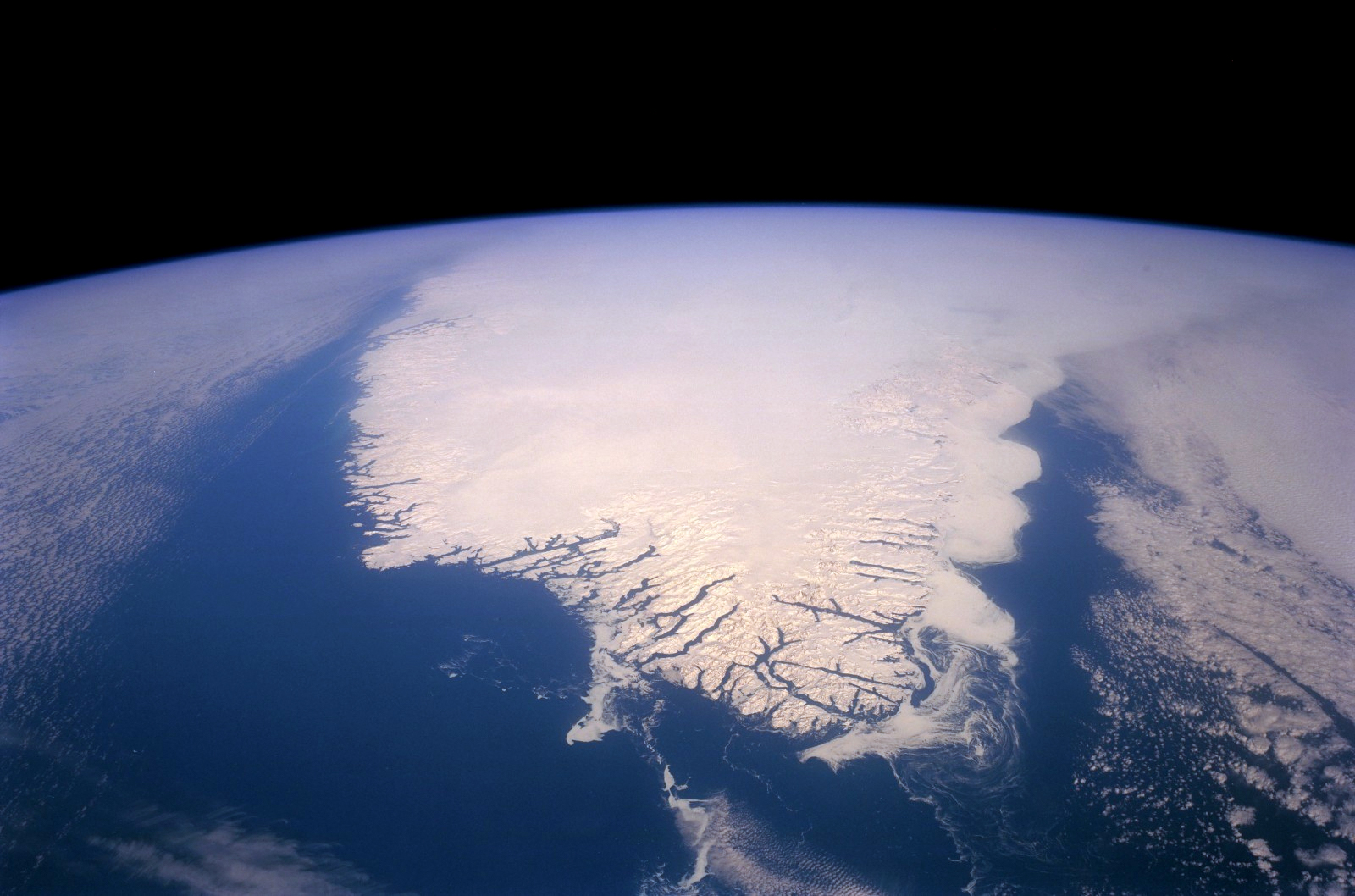
Around 80% of Greenland is covered with ice, up to 3 km in thickness.

=== Geography ===
Greenland is an island in the North Atlantic Ocean spanning 2,166,086 km^{2}, roughly three times the size of Texas.

About 80% of the island is covered by the Greenland ice sheet, while the remaining 20% consists of mountainous, rugged and mostly barren coastal terrain. No roads link the 17 largest towns (where most of the population lives) because of the challenging landscape. The vast Greenlandic ice sheet is not safe to walk or drive over.

=== Political status ===
Greenland Self-Government Act, Chapter 8, Greenland's access to independence

21. (1) The decision on Greenland's independence shall be made by the Greenlandic people.
(2) In case of such decision pursuant to subsection 1, negotiations are initiated between the government and Naalakkersuisut for the purpose of implementing independence for Greenland.
(3) An agreement between Naalakkersuisut and the government on the implementation of independence for Greenland shall be made with the consent of Inatsisartut and shall be approved by a referendum in Greenland. Any agreement shall in addition be with the consent of the Danish Parliament.
(4) Independence for Greenland entails, that Greenland assumes sovereignty over Greenland.

— "Lov om Grønlands Selvstyre", 12 June 2009

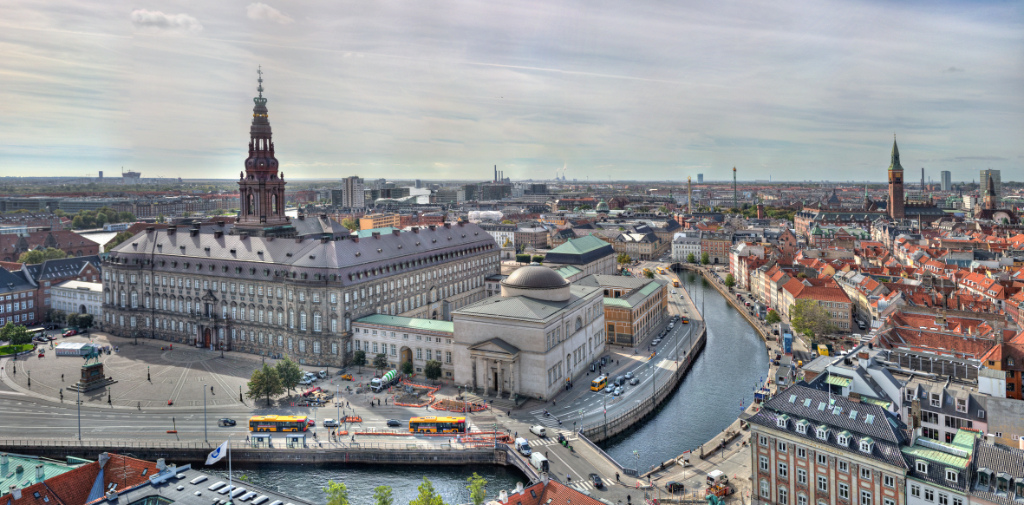
Christiansborg in Copenhagen, seat of the Danish Parliament, from where Greenland's foreign, defense and security policy is decided

Greenland is an autonomous territory within the Kingdom of Denmark. In 1953, Denmark formally added what was then its colony to the kingdom. The Greenlandic government has authority over Greenland's internal affairs such as the economy, social services, and infrastructure, while Denmark is responsible for the island's foreign affairs, defense, citizenship, currency, and monetary policy. The Danish Supreme Court is the final court of appeal.

The Danish Realm

Under Danish law, Greenlandic independence is possible based on the Self-Government Act of 2009, after a referendum in Greenland and approval by the Danish parliament. Others say that an amendment of the Danish Constitution is needed. Independence would transfer sovereignty from Denmark. The Greenlandic government declared in February 2024 that independence is its goal. Due to its status as a former colony, some commentators argue that under international law Greenland has right of self-determination and could make a unilateral declaration of independence.

The position of the Danish government is that it is up to Greenland to decide its own future, and that Denmark would respect a Greenlandic vote for independence. The Danish government reluctantly agreed in 2017 to finance two new airports, replacing potential Chinese investors, even though the investments sought by the island are viewed as preparing for independence. Greenland gives Denmark a role in the Arctic; it is a member of the Arctic Council and as one of the five Arctic littoral states, a signatory to the Ilulissat Declaration.

Icelandic scholar Guðmundur Alfreðsson said that Greenland should consider Denmark one of several competitors for it, and that the US or Canada might provide more funding. Rasmus Leander Nielsen of the University of Greenland said that Greenlanders have discussed since the 1980s creating a compact of free association (COFA) with Denmark after independence, but that some have suggested a COFA with the US instead.

=== Defense ===
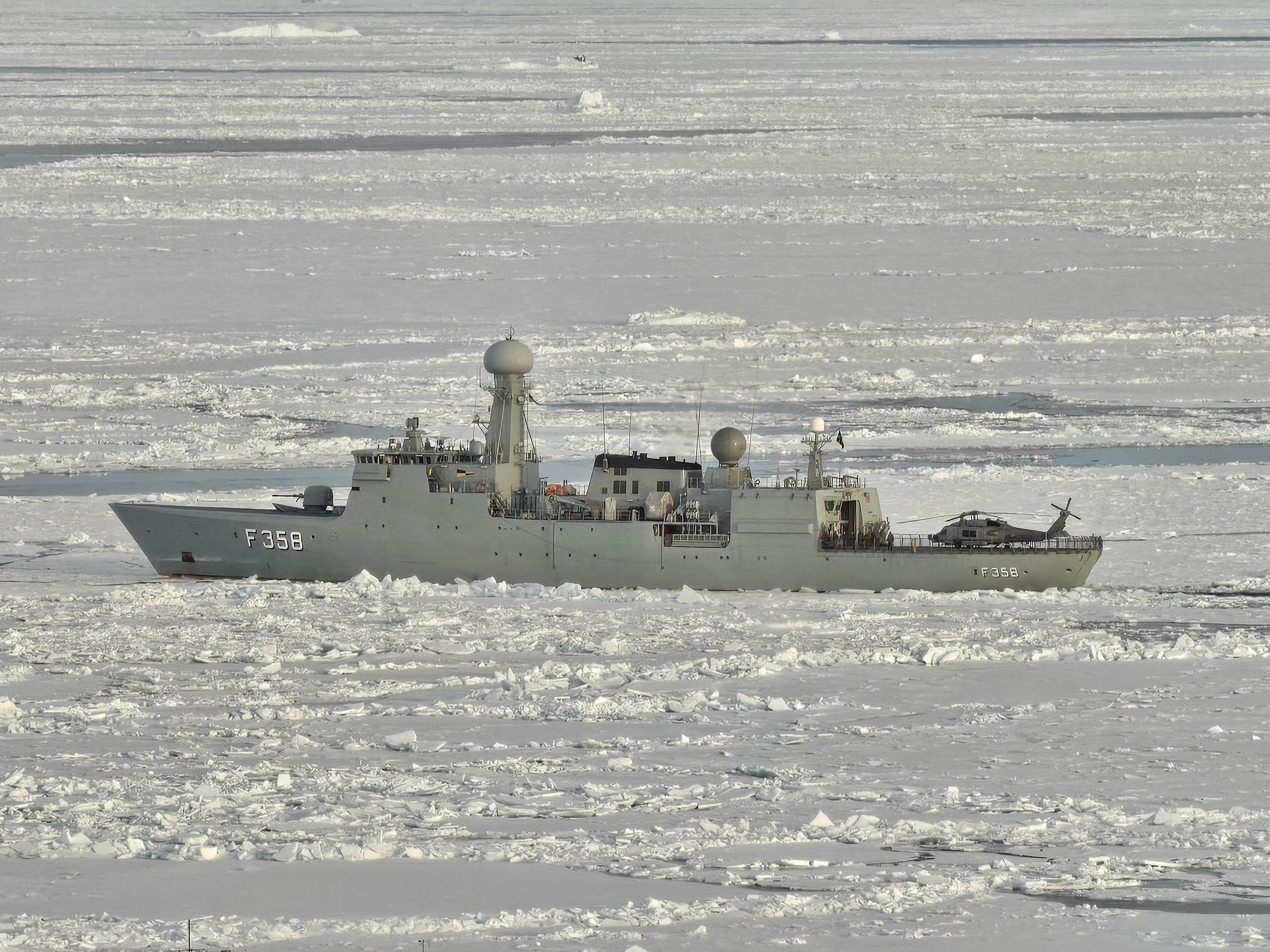
The Royal Danish Navy frigate HDMS Triton, carrying a MH-60R, off the coast of Greenland

Greenland does not have its own military. As a territory of Denmark, the Danish military is responsible for Greenland's defense, and the island is within the area overseen by the NATO military alliance. The Joint Arctic Command is the Danish military branch responsible for Greenland. In 2020, Denmark's Arctic Command had four ships, four helicopters, one maritime patrol aircraft, and six dogsled teams to patrol the island. The Danish military has personnel based at Nuuk, Kangerlussuaq, Daneborg, Station Nord, Mestersvig, Grønnedal, and a liaison detachment at Thule Air Base. In 2019, Denmark announced that it would spend a further kr. 1.5 billion to monitor Greenland, while in December 2024 it announced plans to build up its military presence in Greenland with more personnel, patrol ships, long-range drones, and upgrading an airport to handle Danish F-35 fighter aircraft. This followed American demands for more Danish defense spending, including by the first Trump administration.

Alex Gray, United States National Security Council chief of staff during the first Trump administration, said Danes "understand they don't have the ability to defend Greenland post independence". Denmark's active-duty military is smaller than the New York Police Department. The United States "accepted the legal obligation to defend against any attack" on Greenland in a 1951 treaty with Denmark. It has had bases there since the Second World War. The 1951 Greenland Defense Agreement allowed the United States to keep its three main military bases in Greenland—Thule, Narsarsuaq and Sondestrom—and to establish new bases or "defense areas" if deemed necessary by NATO. The agreement allows US troops to freely use and move between these bases. The US military has jurisdiction over the defense areas, but is not to infringe upon Danish sovereignty in Greenland. Since the agreement, the US has shut all of its military bases in Greenland except for Pituffik Space Base (formerly Thule Air Base). The 2004 Igaliku Agreement stated that the US must inform Denmark and Greenland of any proposed changes (although formal co-determination is not required). Elian Morvane argued that, since the 1951 Defense Agreement already provides the United States with broad military rights in Greenland, the demand for formal sovereignty functions as a maximalist negotiating position aimed at securing concessions the treaty does not automatically grant—particularly rights over critical minerals and expanded military jurisdiction over bases. Under this interpretation, the rhetoric of ownership also serves as leverage over Greenland's trajectory toward independence from Denmark: a newly independent Greenlandic state would be a more accommodating interlocutor than an established NATO ally bound by European legal obligations. Any new US bases in Greenland would require the consent of Denmark (under the 1951 Defense Agreement) and the Greenlandic government (due to the 2009 Act on Greenland Self-Government). Greenlandic governments have said they would keep the country within NATO if Greenland becomes independent.

=== Economy ===
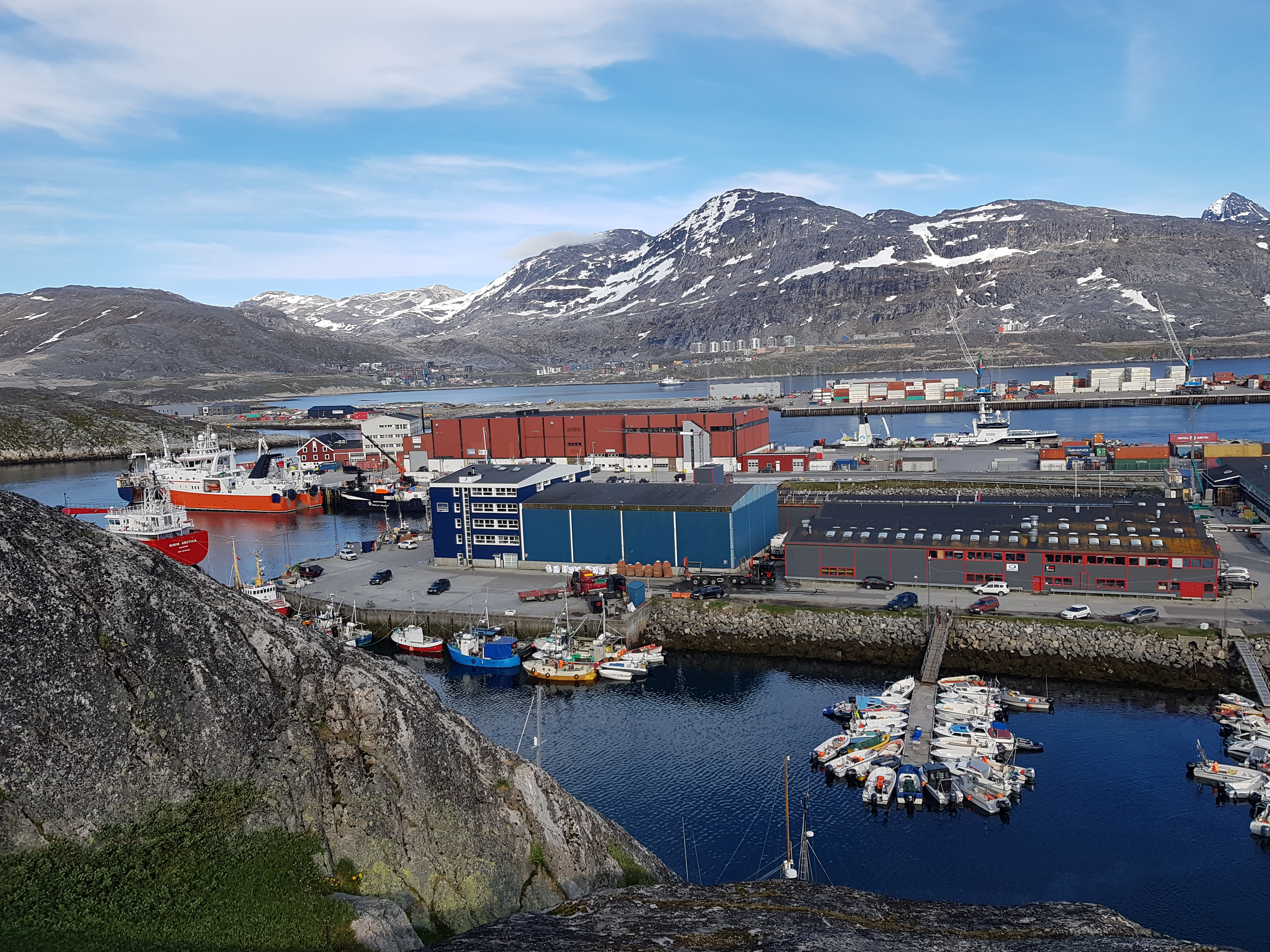
Nuuk Port, Greenland

Even though Greenland's annual GDP in 2021 was $3 billion, 0.007% that of the United States, Greenland's GDP per capita was about 69% of the U.S. level. At the same time, Greenland's Gini coefficient for income distribution is around 0.34 according to CIA estimate for 2015, similar to many continental European countries and clearly in the "more equal" range, whereas recent U.S. Gini estimates for household income are about 0.47–0.48 and markedly more unequal than Greenland.

As of 2017 Denmark is by far Greenland's largest trade partner, receiving 55% of the island's exports and providing 63% of imports. As of 2023 it subsidizes Greenland with kr. 5.6 billion annually. The island's largest private industry is fishing. Covering an area of 2,166,086 km^{2}, it has vast natural resources, including uranium, rare-earth minerals, and estimated 50 billion barrels of offshore oil and gas. Greenland has only one operating mine and little infrastructure, however; it has one commercial international airport. Forty-three percent of Greenlanders work for the government, compared to 15% in the United States. The island's per capita disposable income is the lowest in the Arctic other than Russia's, and less than one third that of the American state of Alaska. Greenland's working-age population is estimated to decline by 16% by 2040.

In 2016, it was reported that Danish investors have little presence in Greenland, although one fifth of Greenlanders live in Denmark. Denmark has relinquished control over raw materials to the island, so has little interest in its resources. The island has one of the world's largest neodymium deposits, near Narsaq, but the Inuit do not have a history of mining so outside workers would be needed. A 2014 report stated that replacing the Danish subsidy would require 24 large projects each costing kr. 5 billion, one opening every two years. As no investors existed for such projects, the report by 13 scholars said that Greenland would remain dependent on the subsidy for at least 25 years to maintain its welfare system. Minik Thorleif Rosing, one of the authors, in 2025 said that the situation had not changed: "Even if you had an unrealistically high rate of development of mineral resources, it would be unlikely to replace more than half the annual block grant from Denmark in any near future".

Although Greenlandic officials have approached dozens of Canadian and Australian mining companies, many are hesitant. The Kvanefjeld dispute may dissuade the American investors that the government also welcomes. Because of the lack of infrastructure, all mining projects are greenfield land and investors need to build new roads, ports, and power plants. As of March 2025 the island has only two active mines: one for gold that is being commissioned, and one owned by Lumina Sustainable Materials for anorthosite. A ruby mine closed in 2024 after bankruptcy. "Investing in Greenland is not for the faint of heart", CEO Brian Hanrahan of Lumina said, stating that the anorthosite mine was more complex than any of the 270 worldwide sites he oversaw at another job. Greenlandic governments have welcomed increased US interest and investment as long as it is respectful of sovereignty and Greenland's right to self-determination.

== Claimed American goals of acquisition ==
The claimed American goals of acquiring Greenland are defensive and economic.

=== Defense of the mainland United States ===
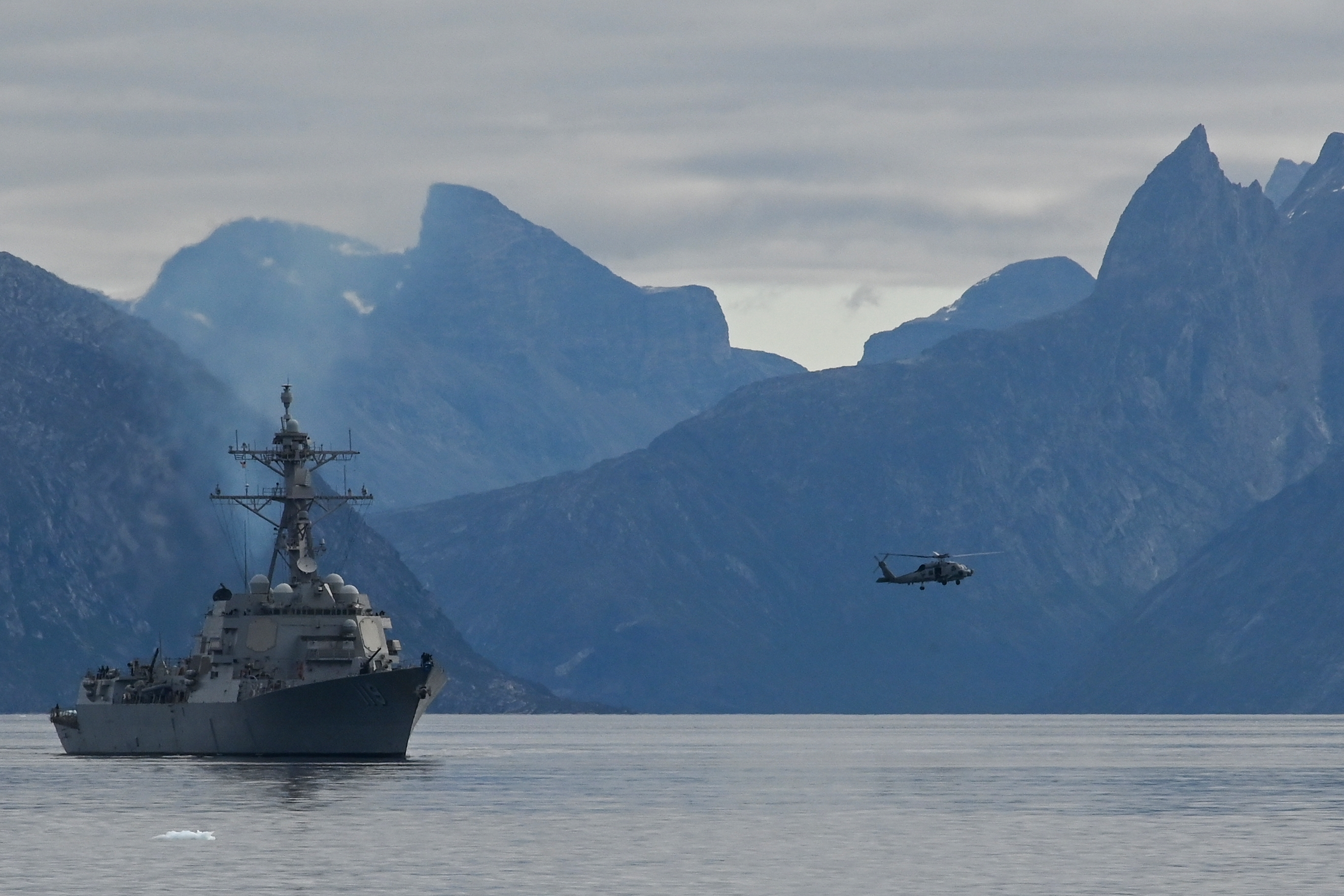
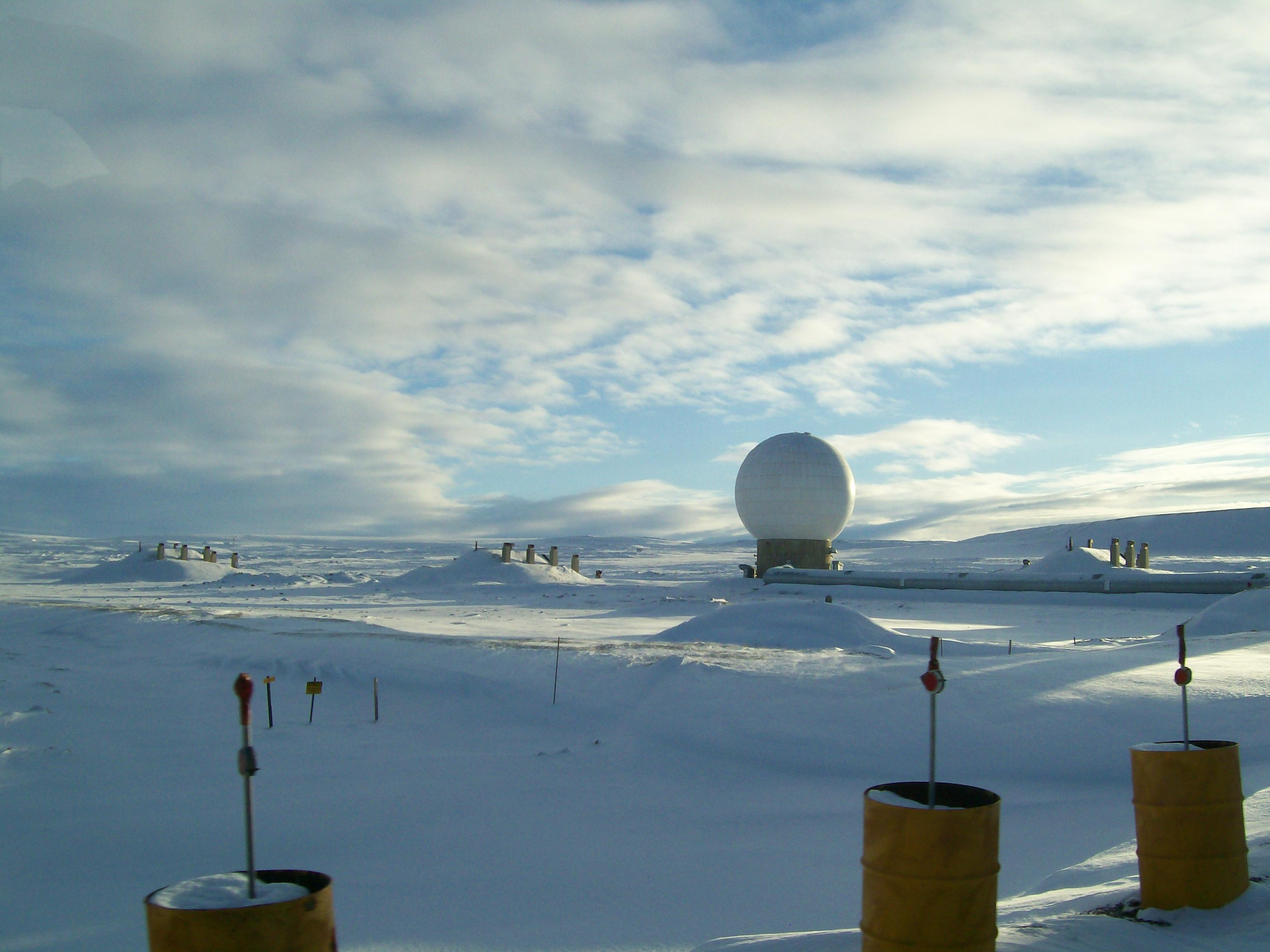
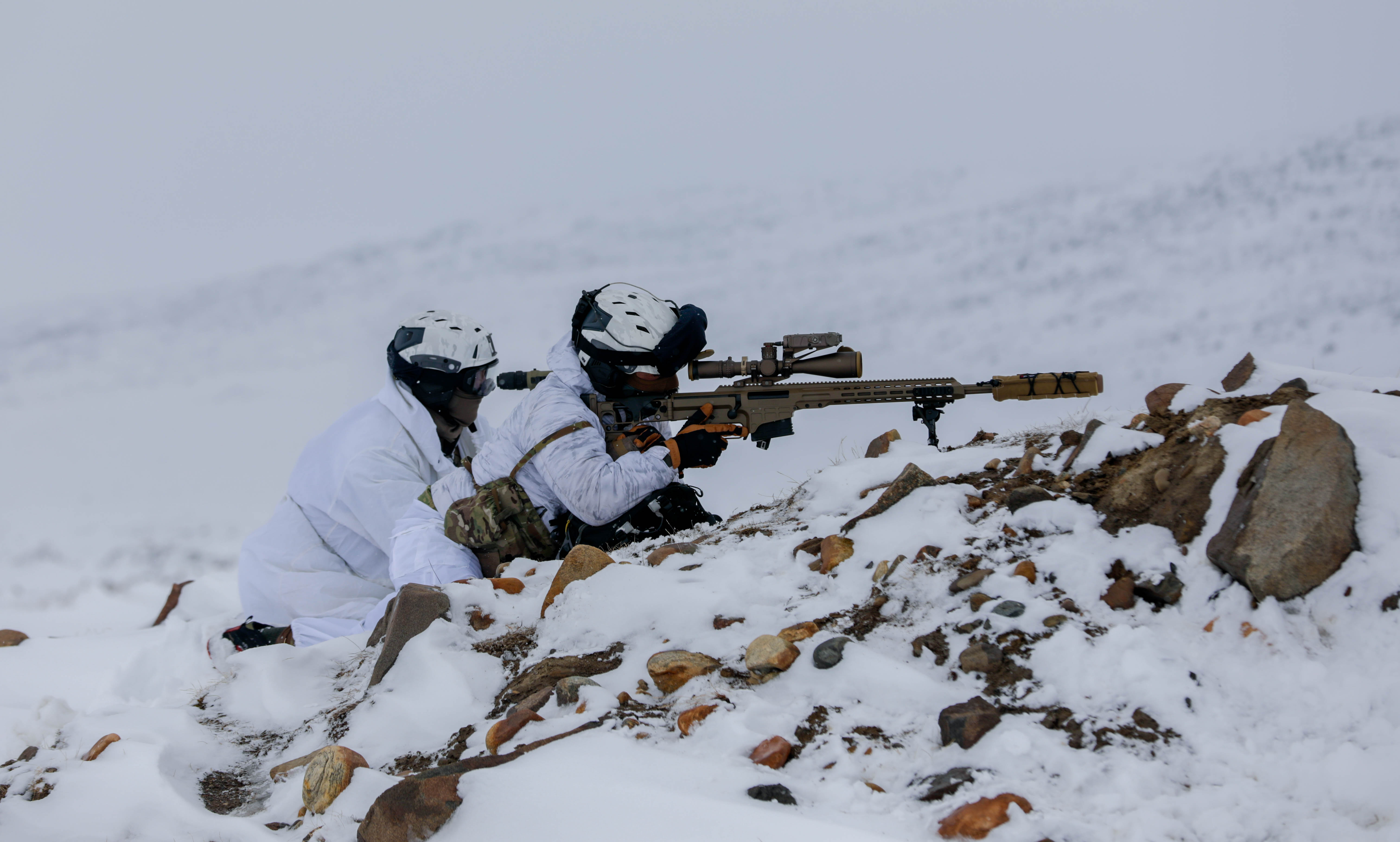
Pictured, clockwise from top left: the Arleigh Burke-class destroyer USS Delbert D. Black launches her embarked Seahawk helicopter in Greenland's Nuup Kagerlua Fjord in 2024; radar domes at the former Thule Air Base are pictured in 2010; U.S. special operators in Avannaata during the Arctic Edge 2023 exercise

An acquisition of Greenland would give the United States control of an island that it sees as crucial to its defense. Greenland is under the protection of NATO, of which the US and Denmark are both members. The US has free use of its Pituffik military base in Greenland, and a 1951 treaty allows the US to establish new bases in Greenland if deemed necessary by NATO. The US also takes part in regular NATO military exercises in Greenlandic waters.

Reuters described Greenland in October 2020 as "a security black hole" for the US and allies, and said its 27,000 miles (44,000 km) of coastline was difficult to monitor. "On several occasions since 2006, foreign vessels have turned up unexpectedly or without the necessary protocols, in waters that NATO-member Denmark aims to defend", the news agency reported. A potential security threat are Russian ships believed to have the ability to tap undersea cables or sever them during a conflict.

A 2021 study by the RAND Corporation expressed concern that Greenland "could be seduced into Russia's or China's orbit" were it to gain independence from Denmark. Speaking in 2025, Rasmus Sinding Søndergaard of the Danish Institute for International Studies said that the US had legitimate security concerns in Greenland that Denmark had failed to adequately safeguard. Russia is much more capable of Arctic land warfare than the US, and Greenland may be vulnerable to invasion. The US sees Greenlandic airspace as vital to the air defense of North America. The US has demanded that Denmark provide better airspace surveillance over Greenland and a 2022 study by RAND suggested integrating Greenland into the North American Aerospace Defense Command (NORAD).

==== Control of the GIUK gap ====
Map showing the approximate boundary lines of the GIUK Gap

The US views control of the GIUK gap (Greenland–Iceland–UK gap) as critical to the maritime defense of eastern North America. The smaller portion of the gap is located between Greenland and Iceland measuring approximately 300 km (190 miles), whereas the larger portion of the gap, about 800 km (500 miles), is located between Iceland and the UK. A wartime priority of the US is to "close the gap", or prevent an enemy navy traveling from the Norwegian Sea toward North America. In 1957, the US led Exercise Strikeback, the largest ever peacetime naval exercise, focused on stopping an aggressive "Orange Fleet" from transiting the gap, which was to be accomplished by means of a blockade involving hundreds of warships. During much of the Cold War, the importance of closing the gap was to prevent Soviet SSBNs from sailing to within firing range of Washington, D.C., and New York City.

With the improvement of Soviet—and later Russian—missiles, the importance of the gap lessened. It became a priority again in the 21st century as the threat of hybrid warfare rose. Russia stepped up naval activity there, as part of expanding its Arctic presence. It has increased cooperation with China, which wants a Polar Silk Road. Every year, NATO mounts the Northern Viking exercise in and around the gap. In 2024, it involved the United States Sixth Fleet, the Standing Naval Forces, the Icelandic Police and Icelandic Coast Guard.

==== Space defense ====
Military operations have become dependent on polar-orbiting satellites. According to SpaceNews, addressing the matter of Greenland, "any satellite in a polar or sun-synchronous orbit, such as those in critical communications, imagery and weather monitoring constellations, requires an Arctic ground station". The US Space Force base in Greenland, Pituffik Space Base, is one of two Arctic facilities available to the US, the other being Clear Space Force Station in Alaska. If the US lost Pituffik Space Base, this would "have serious consequences for both a future conflict and business as usual in orbit", according to SpaceNews. On 9 January 2025, US representative Mike Haridopolos issued a statement supporting US acquisition of Greenland on grounds of space security, saying "it's a critical part of ensuring our nation's security now and in the future ... America cannot afford to cede an inch in space or the Arctic". Earlier, in July 2024, US Army Lt. Gen. Thomas Carden said the Arctic was "the shortest and least defended threat vector to North America".

=== Control of natural resources ===
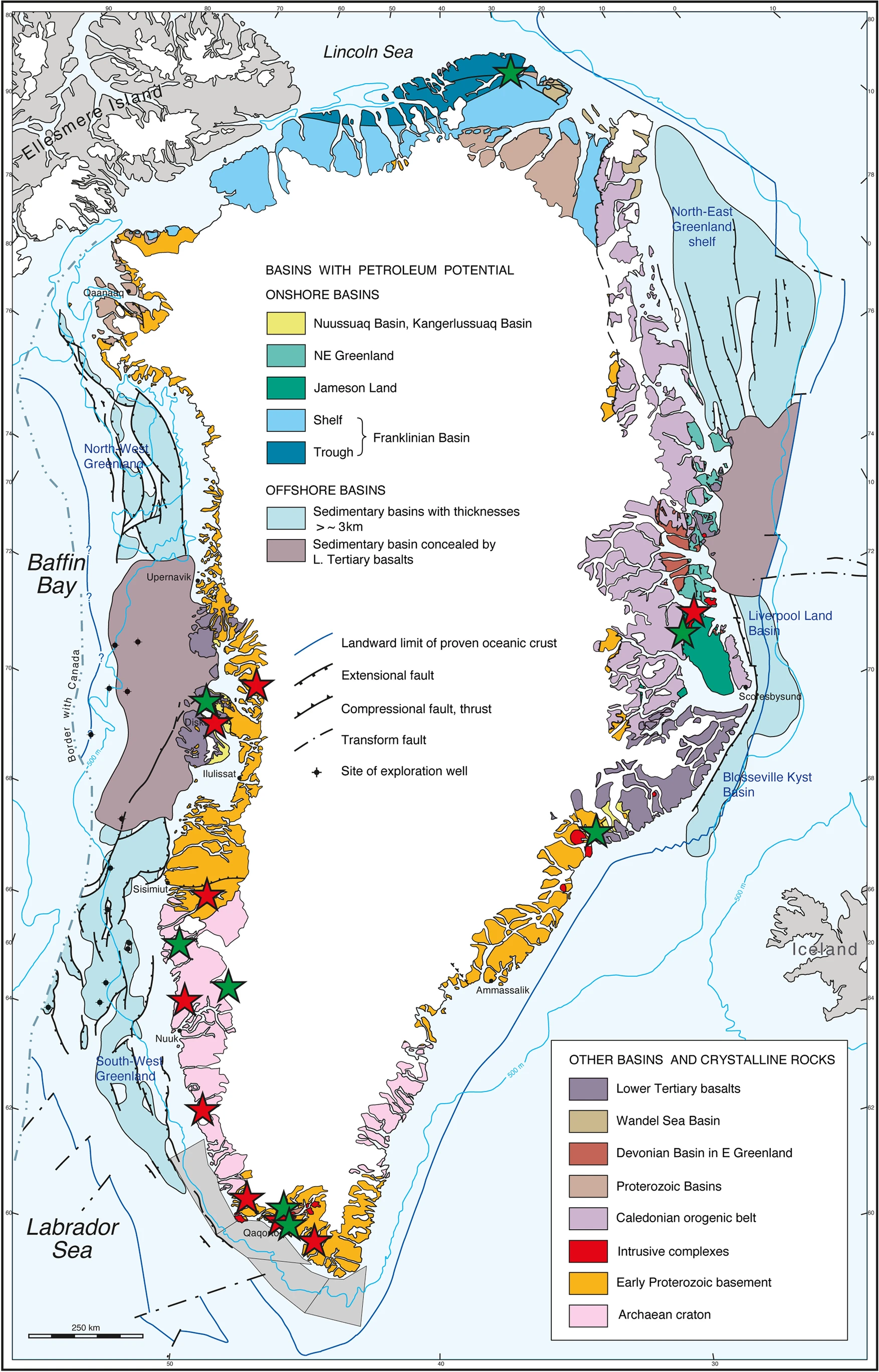
Geological map of Greenland showing petroleum-holding basins. Various kinds of mining projects are marked with stars.

Greenland is home to large deposits of petroleum and rare earth minerals. The United States Geological Survey estimates that Greenlandic waters could hold 17.5 billion barrels of offshore crude oil and 4.19 trillion cubic meters of natural gas. The island has the largest deposits of rare-earth elements outside China. Two thirds of the planet's fresh water outside Antarctica are frozen in the Greenland ice sheet, which covers 80% of the island. Increased melting of the ice sheet due to climate change could provide more access to Greenland's rock flour, which has unusually strong ability for soil regeneration and direct air capture of carbon.

Javier Blas of Bloomberg wrote in 2025 that "hyperbole around Greenland and commodities has a 50-year long history", noting that Greenland had never produced any petroleum and the attempt to mine iron ore ended in bankruptcy. A majority of possible mineral sites are north of the Arctic Circle; those south of the circle are mostly small. As of 2023 the US only imported $190 million in rare-earths; if prices rose, they could be obtained more easily from American and other deposits than from Greenland. Blas urged the US to focus on the African copperbelt and elsewhere as more important.

=== Size of territory ===
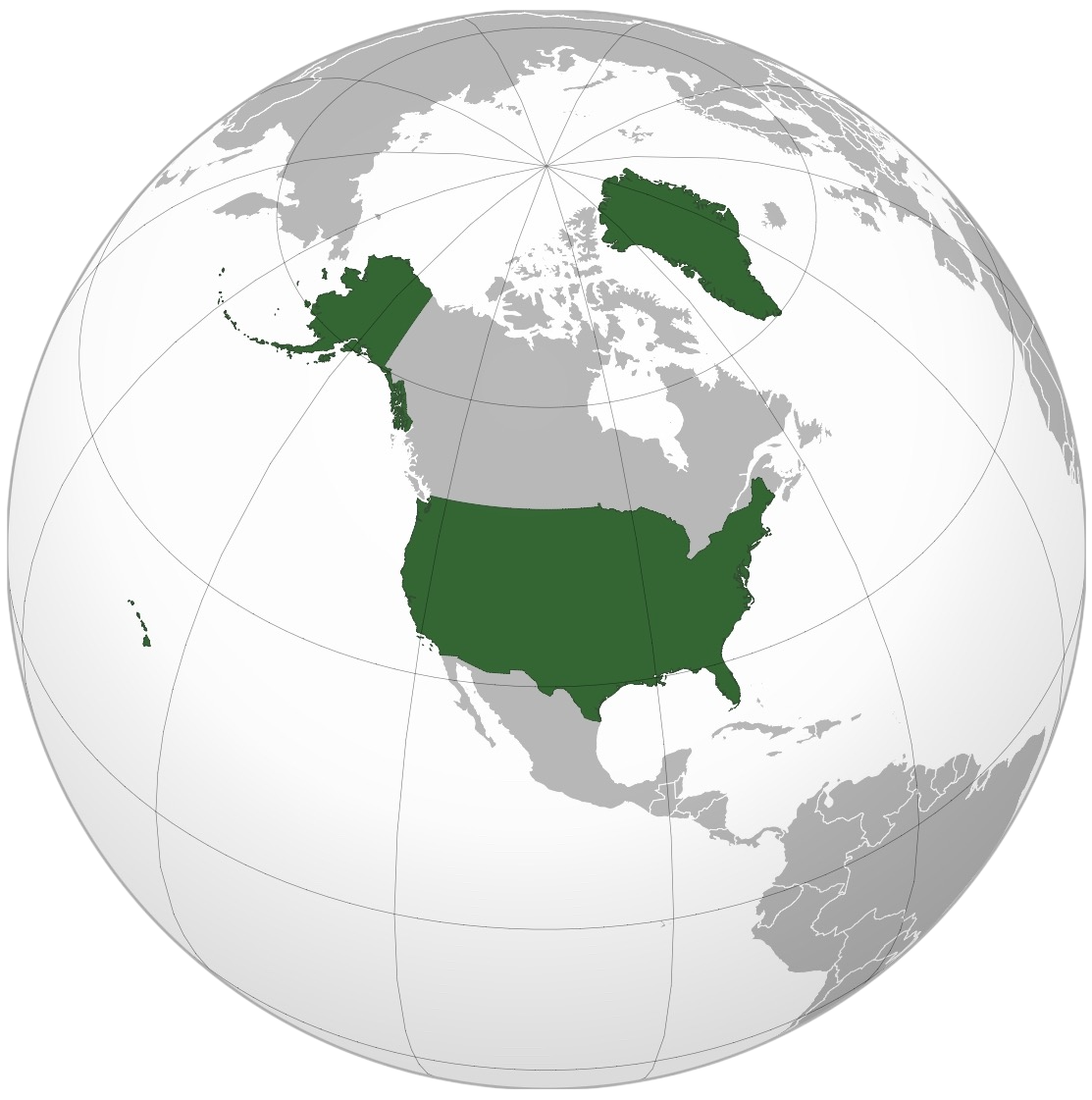
A map showing the United States and Greenland as one country

Impressed by the size of the island, Trump stated, "It's massive. That should be part of the United States". He expressed thoughts that its acquisition would be a great "real estate" deal. Greenland spans 849,420 square miles, four times the size of Spain, but about 80% of Greenland is covered by a thick ice sheet. The other 20% of ice-free land is mostly mountainous and rocky, and only 1% of the land is considered accessible, which is why the vast majority of the population live in just 16 towns along the rugged coastline. If Greenland became part of the United States, the US would become the second-largest country in the world by area, after Russia. It would be the largest territorial acquisition in American history, slightly larger than the Louisiana Purchase.

== History ==
=== Early claims on Greenland ===
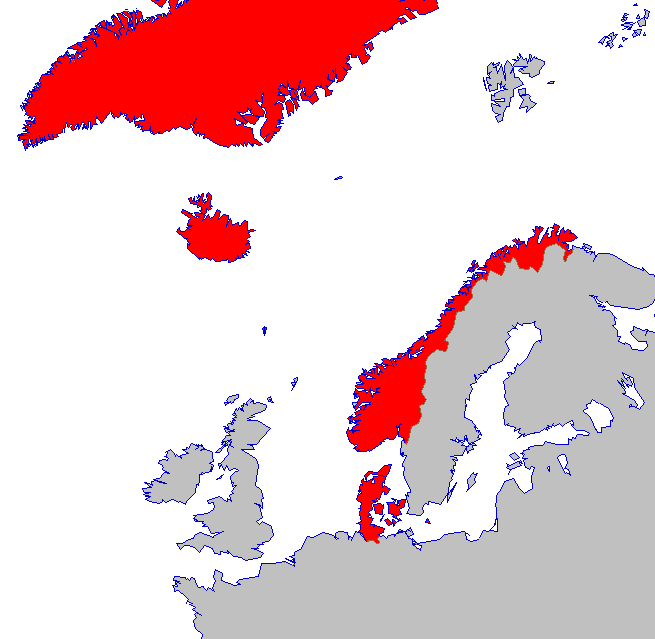
Denmark–Norway in 1780

Paleo-Eskimo peoples had been living in Greenland periodically from around 2500 BC. Norsemen began settling the uninhabited southern part of Greenland during the late 10th century AD. In 1261, the Norse settlements in southern Greenland accepted Norwegian overlordship. These colonies began dying out and were gone by 1500, but Norway's territorial claims to Greenland continued to be asserted by Denmark–Norway after the union of the Danish and Norwegian realms in 1537. In the 1700s, missionaries and traders from Denmark–Norway began recolonizing southern Greenland. In 1775, when the US was still a colony of the United Kingdom, Denmark–Norway declared Greenland a colony. When Denmark and Norway separated in 1814, Greenland was kept by Denmark under the Treaty of Kiel. Denmark began trying to colonize all of Greenland in the 1880s, and declared sovereignty over the whole island in 1921.

During the Polaris expedition of the early 1870s, American Charles Francis Hall was the first outsider to see northwest Greenland, decades before Denmark's first permanent settlement in the northwest in 1909. From 1886 to 1909, American Robert Peary was the first outsider to explore far northern Greenland and unofficially claimed much of the area for the United States.

=== 1867 proposal ===
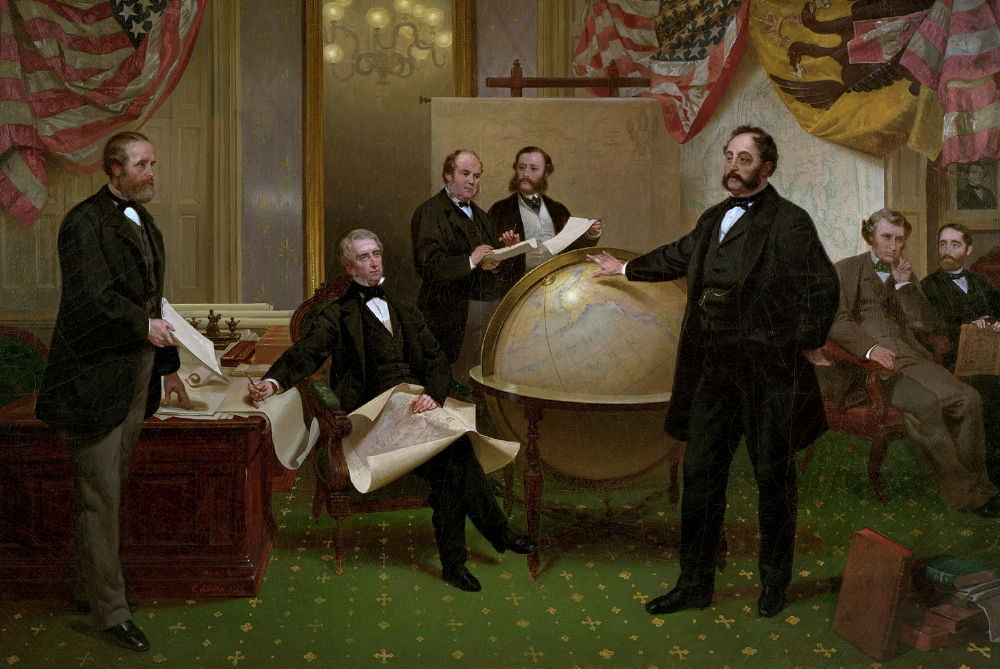
United States secretary of state William H. Seward (pictured, seated at center) commissioned an 1868 report on the feasibility of U.S. acquisition of Greenland.

In 1867, United States secretary of state William H. Seward negotiated the Alaska Purchase from the Russian Empire. He that year considered the idea of United States annexation of both Greenland and Iceland an idea "worthy of serious consideration". Robert J. Walker, like Seward an advocate of American expansionism, submitted to Seward a report by the United States Coast Survey that the secretary of state had requested on the two islands. The government published the report (A Report on the Resources of Iceland and Greenland, Peirce 1868). Seward wanted to encourage Americans to support a potential purchase offer, so the report very positively described Greenland's "unusual healthfulness" and large amounts of fish, game, and minerals. The report predicted that annexation would also encourage Canada—between American territory to the east and west—to join the United States.

In 1868, negotiations by the secretary for purchasing both Greenland and Iceland from Denmark for $5.5 million in gold were reportedly "nearly complete" but Seward made no offer, probably because Congress did not approve a treaty to acquire the Danish West Indies. President Andrew Johnson was very unpopular with Republicans in Congress, and although Seward was also a Republican, his association with Johnson made passing his proposals unlikely.

=== 1910 proposal ===
A proposal for acquisition of Greenland was discussed within the American government in 1910 by United States ambassador to Denmark Maurice Francis Egan. As suggested by Danish "persons of importance" who were friends of Egan, the United States would trade Mindanao and Palawan for Greenland and the Danish West Indies; Denmark could then trade Mindanao and Palawan to Germany for Northern Schleswig. Denmark regained Northern Schleswig from Germany after the German defeat in World War I following the 1920 Schleswig plebiscites.

=== Treaty of the Danish West Indies ===
Appendix to the
Treaty of the Danish West Indies

"... the undersigned Secretary of State of the United States of America, duly authorized by his Government, has the honor to declare that the Government of the United States of America will not object to the Danish Government extending their political and economic interests to the whole of Greenland".

— Robert Lansing, signed at New York, 4 August 1916,

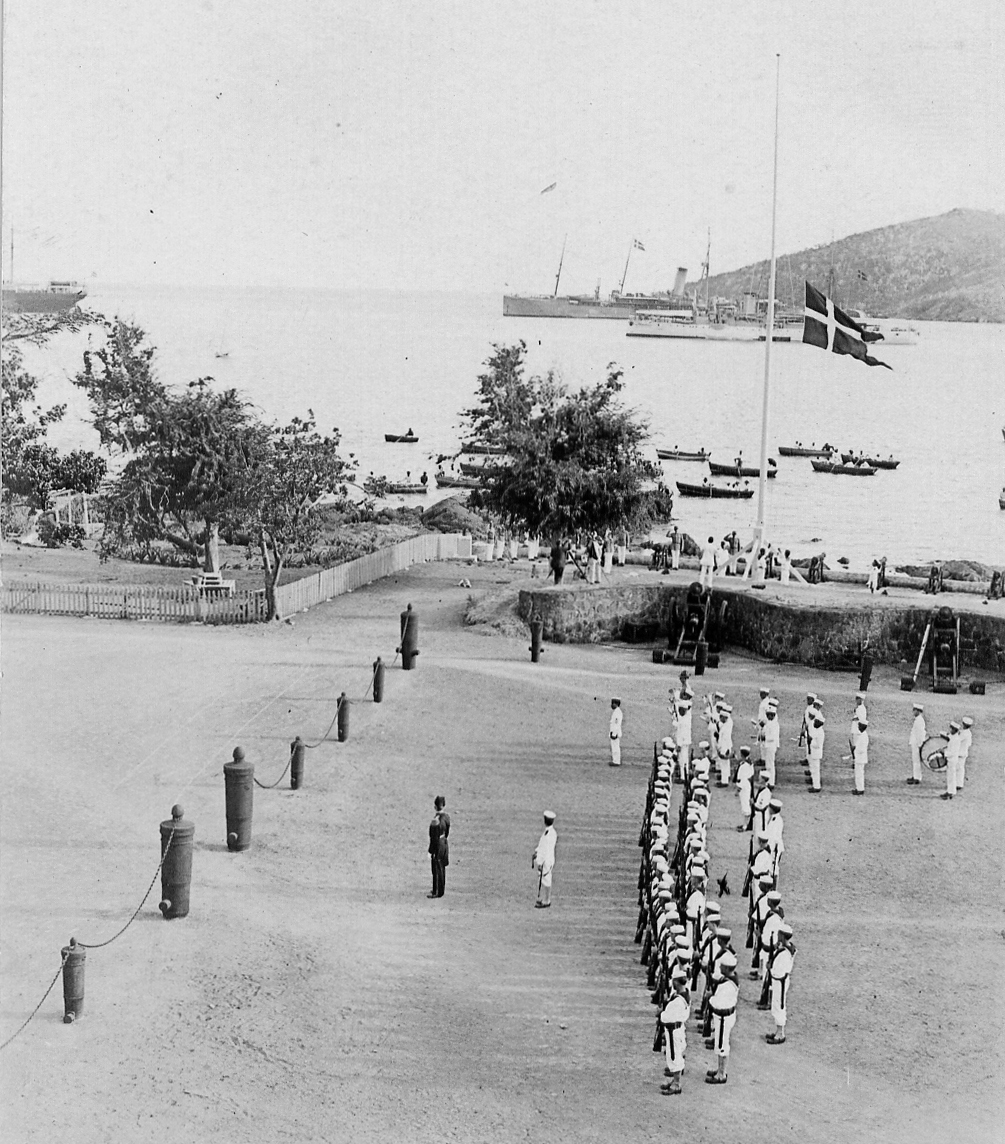
Pictured, the Danish evacuation of Saint Croix, after the United States acquisition of the Danish West Indies in 1917

Another American attempt to buy the Danish West Indies failed in 1902, this time because the Danish parliament did not pass the treaty. During the First World War, the United States again wanted to buy the Danish West Indies. Denmark wanted the United States to recognize the Danish claim over the whole of Greenland. United States secretary of state Robert Lansing proposed that the two issues be combined.

In 1916, Denmark sold the Danish West Indies to the United States, which were renamed the United States Virgin Islands and made an unincorporated territory of the United States. As part of the Convention between the United States and Denmark for cession of the Danish West Indies, President Woodrow Wilson authorized Secretary of State Robert Lansing to issue a unilateral declaration affirming the U.S. "will not object to the Danish Government extending their political and economic interests to the whole of Greenland". This recognition of Danish sovereignty over Greenland was a key concession that allowed expedition of the sale of the Virgin Islands by the reluctant Danes, as explained by Lansing in his memoirs.

Peary encouraged the United States to assert its claim to Greenland, believing that not doing so violated the Monroe Doctrine. He wanted to purchase the island for mineral wealth and to avoid foreign bases that would, as air and sea technology improved, threaten his country. During World War I, the United States decided that obtaining the Danish West Indies to defend the Panama Canal was more important, but in the 1920s General Billy Mitchell, advocating for expanding American air forces, wanted American bases on Greenland and Iceland.

=== Second World War ===
American servicemen in Greenland during World War II

In 1939, United States secretary of state Cordell Hull's staff advised him not to offer to buy Greenland. United States secretary of war Harry Woodring said that the island was too far from American sea or air routes. Within one year, however, the German invasion of Denmark on 9 April 1940 showed the American government that Peary had been correct about Greenland's importance to the Arctic policy of the United States. Before World War II, the island was part of Rainbow 4, a contingency plan to deal with a siege of North America in which the United States was simultaneously attacked from every direction by every great power. In Rainbow 4, American forces would preemptively seize all Dutch, Danish, and French possessions in the Western Hemisphere—including Greenland—and garrison them to form a defensive perimeter around the United States. Its conquest of Denmark now gave Germany a strong legal claim to Greenland. Britain and Canada were also possible foreign occupiers.

Due to its proximity to mainland North America, it being the only known significant source of cryolite at the time, and German attempts to use the island during the North Atlantic weather war, the United States for the first time applied the Monroe Doctrine on European colonies in the North Atlantic Ocean. The US landed armed United States Coast Guard personnel from USCGC Northland (WPG-49) in Greenland to begin the occupation of Greenland. Prior to landing, the Coast Guardsmen were formally discharged from service and reconstituted as a force of "volunteers" to create a legal fiction that would avoid charges of an American invasion of the country, the United States being neutral and the Danish government under German occupation not having agreed to the landing.

On 9 April 1941, Hull and Danish ambassador to the United States Henrik Kauffmann signed the "Agreement Relating to the Defense of Greenland". The American stated that defending Greenland was consistent with the Monroe Doctrine and Act of Havana of 1940. On 13 April 1940 Hull reiterated to Britain and Canada the United States' 1920 objection to the British reservation. The United States Army began construction of Bluie West One in July 1941, the first of several bases. Kauffmann acted without the consent of his government, which considered the agreement to be void and recalled Kauffmann. He stayed in the United States, and after the war the Danish government again recognized "the good traitor" as ambassador to the country.

=== Post-war efforts to repatriate U.S. forces ===
At the end of the war, Denmark expected U.S. forces to exit Greenland and was taken by surprise when the United States indicated it had no intention of leaving. Over the next several years, Danish officials attempted, unsuccessfully, to convince the United States to leave the island. According to Jeroen van Dongen, a period of tension between the two countries followed as, despite its desires, "Denmark was clearly not in a position to force the USA to leave Greenland" nor did it have any means at its disposal to deny the U.S. access to the territory.

By spring 1948, Denmark gave up on persuading the Americans to leave. Part of why the country joined NATO, Trade Minister Jens Otto Krag wrote in his diary, was that since "the USA's de facto partial occupation of Greenland (which we do not possess the power to prevent)" would cause the Soviet Union to see his country as an American ally, Denmark should benefit from the relationship. Some Danes hoped that as a NATO member the United States would discuss Greenlandic issues multilaterally, or vacate the bases as Denmark was an ally, but such did not occur.

=== 1946 proposal ===
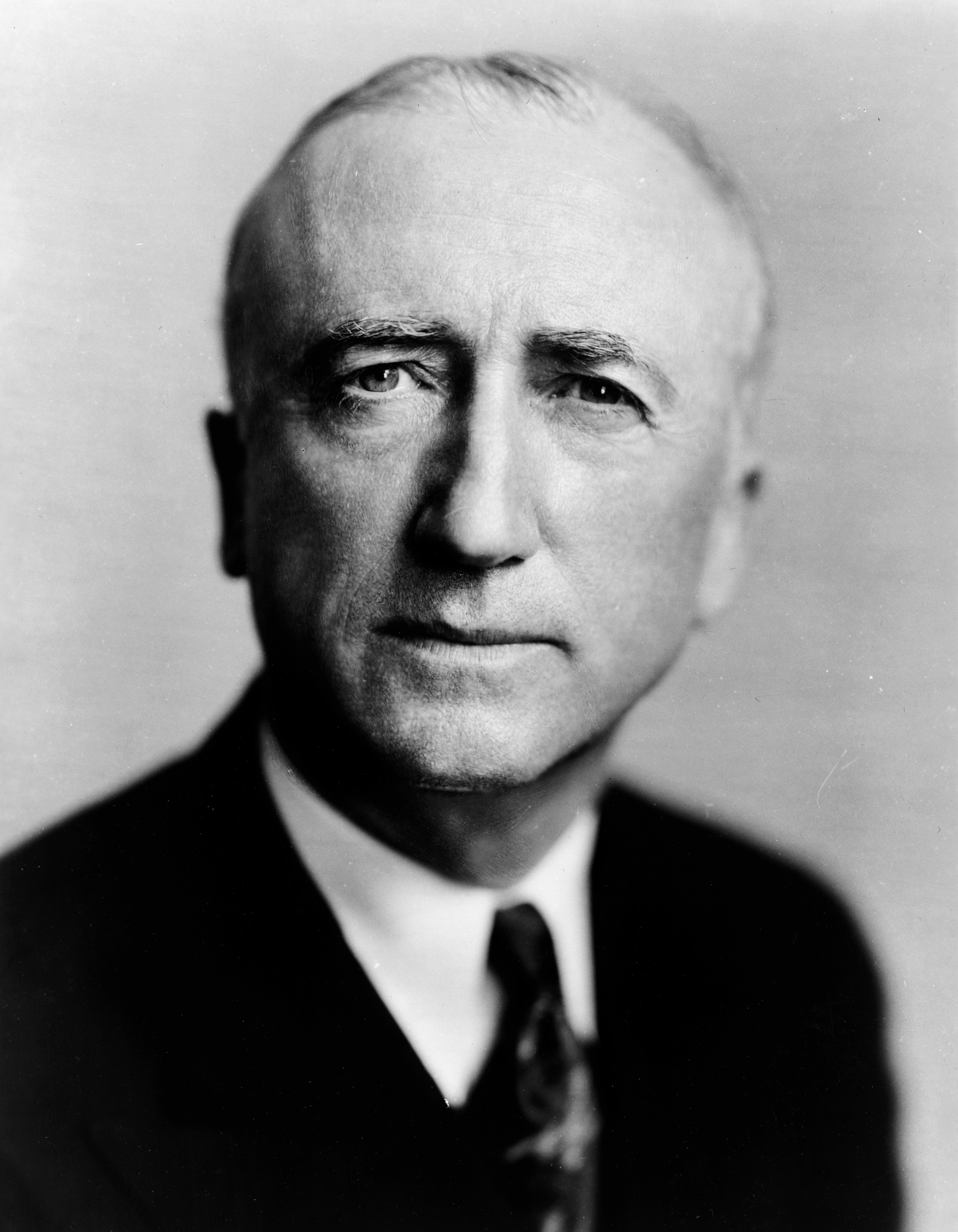
In 1946, U.S. secretary of state James F. Byrnes offered $100 million to Denmark in exchange for Greenland.

In 1946, the Joint Chiefs of Staff listed Greenland and Iceland as two of the three essential international locations for American bases. During the creation of NATO, the two islands were seen as more important to American and Canadian defense than some Western European countries; Greenland is on the shortest polar route between Washington and Moscow, and about midway between the two cities. Also in 1946, the United States offered Denmark $100 million ($1 billion today) in gold bullion for Greenland. United States senator Owen Brewster said in November 1945 that he considered buying the island "a military necessity". The planning and strategy committee of the Joint Chiefs of Staff determined in April 1946 that acquiring the "completely worthless to Denmark" island was vital to the United States.

William C. Trimble of the State Department argued that while "there are few people in Denmark who have any real interest in Greenland, economic, political or financial", owning it would give the United States staging areas from which to launch military operations over the Arctic against America's adversaries. He suggested the $100 million price, and discussed an alternate offer of land in Point Barrow, Alaska. Had the Alaska trade occurred, from 1967 Denmark would have benefited from Prudhoe Bay Oil Field, the richest petroleum discovery in American history. Secretary of State James F. Byrnes made the $100 million offer on 14 December 1946, in a memorandum delivered to Danish foreign minister Gustav Rasmussen when he visited the United States.

The memorandum described the American position on what to do about the informal 1941 agreement made in 1941 by Kauffmann to station United States forces on Greenland. It suggested three alternatives: Two variations on the 1941 agreement—A 99-year lease on the existing American bases there, or the United States wholly taking over the defense of the island—or the purchase of Greenland. The United States preferred to purchase and believed that doing so was better for Denmark, as it would prevent criticism of American bases on Danish soil and save Denmark the cost of supporting Greenland. The American told the Dane that a sale "would be the most clean-cut and satisfactory".

Byrnes said: "Our needs ... seemed to come as a shock to Rasmussen." The memorandum indeed surprised the Dane; rumors at the time stated that the United States wanted to purchase Greenland, but the Danish government's position was that the United States would withdraw its troops, based upon language in the 1941 Kauffmann agreement that it remained in force "until agreement has been reached that current threats to the peace and security of the American continent have ended". The Danish government understood that the threats were the world war; it did not know that the U.S. understood this to include postwar threats from the Soviet Union as well. Known as "Article X" of the Kauffmann agreement, the clause established that both sides would have to agree to ending it.

Rasmussen declined all three options, and returned to Denmark. He told United States ambassador Josiah Marvel, "[w]hile we owe much to America I do not feel that we owe them the whole island of Greenland". The American offer surprised Rasmussen because of duplicity by Kauffmann, who with a friend at the United States Department of State advocated for an American presence in Greenland while not fully informing the Danish government. Kauffmann had minimized in his reports the importance of proposals of a takeover or purchase in the U.S. House of Representatives, saying that the idea was considered ridiculous by the U.S. government, when in fact it was not. He had also not conveyed important parts of a 1945 American proposal to keep its bases on the island after the war. Rasmussen visited Washington in 1946 expecting to annul the 1941 agreement, not understanding because of Kauffmann's duplicity why nothing had happened with the Danish government's previous overtures in that regard.

Reporting on the United States military's interest in purchasing it, Time in January 1947 stated that Lansing had erred in relinquishing the American claim to "the world's largest island and stationary aircraft carrier". The magazine predicted that Greenland "would be as valuable as Alaska during the next few years" for defense. Time observed that despite national pride "Denmark owes U.S. investors $70 million" while the country had a shortage of dollars, and rumors in Copenhagen stated that the price for the island would be $1 billion ($11 billion today), or almost four times Denmark's aid from the Marshall Plan. Selling Greenland might have made a return to Denmark's traditional neutrality easier, and would have provided funds the country greatly needed after the war. All Danish political parties rejected selling the island when they heard the rumors, however. Jens Sønderup said in a 1947 budget debate:

There have been rumours in the newspapers about America wishing to acquire Greenland. King Dollar is, so to speak, about to become a major factor in all areas. I am not aware of any approach concerning the purchase of Greenland, but assume that it is a given that we will not embark on anything in that respect. Should the Greenlanders desire another relationship or secession, that would be another matter, but in this respect there can be no question of any form of financial transaction.

Rasmussen responded in the debate that the idea was absurd, and declared Denmark unwilling in any way to cede sovereignty over Greenland. The West Indies were only an investment to Danes, but from the Danish Golden Age of the 19th century they saw Danish overseas colonies in the North Atlantic, including Greenland, as part of their Viking history and national identity. The island was for Denmark similar to the British Raj for the United Kingdom, and Danes felt a paternalistic, "White Man's Burden"-like responsibility for its people. While Greenland did not contribute to the Danish economy, Denmark planned to expand trade and resource extraction there. By offering to purchase Greenland, the United States told Denmark that it was not likely to ever leave. Denmark would not fully understand for another decade the island's strategic importance to the United States. The Danish government's own outlook on national security was more parochial, and did not extend to viewing Greenland as a part of that. The legal status of the 1941 arrangement was unsettled, with the United States still pressing for purchase and Denmark rejecting the offer, leaving matters at the status quo ante until the 1960s.

After the November 1947 Danish Folketing election, the new government of Hans Hedtoft continued and expanded Kauffmann's strategy of duplicity. To the Danish public, it maintained that the United States would withdraw from Greenland as expected. To the United States the Hedtoft government stated that its own private position was that the American presence would remain. Its own private position was to persuade the United States to withdraw. Kauffmann likewise continued with his own personal agenda. The Danish government was not duplicitous on one point: It was not going to outright cede Greenland to a foreign power. Marvel told Rasmussen that he should not do anything that would lead to the disclosure of anything that had transpired in Rasmussen's meeting with Byrnes. The Danish government kept the American interest secret from the public, as part of its own strategy. The 1947 offer was classified until the 1970s, and Jyllands-Posten reported on it in 1991.

=== Cold War and 1955 proposal ===
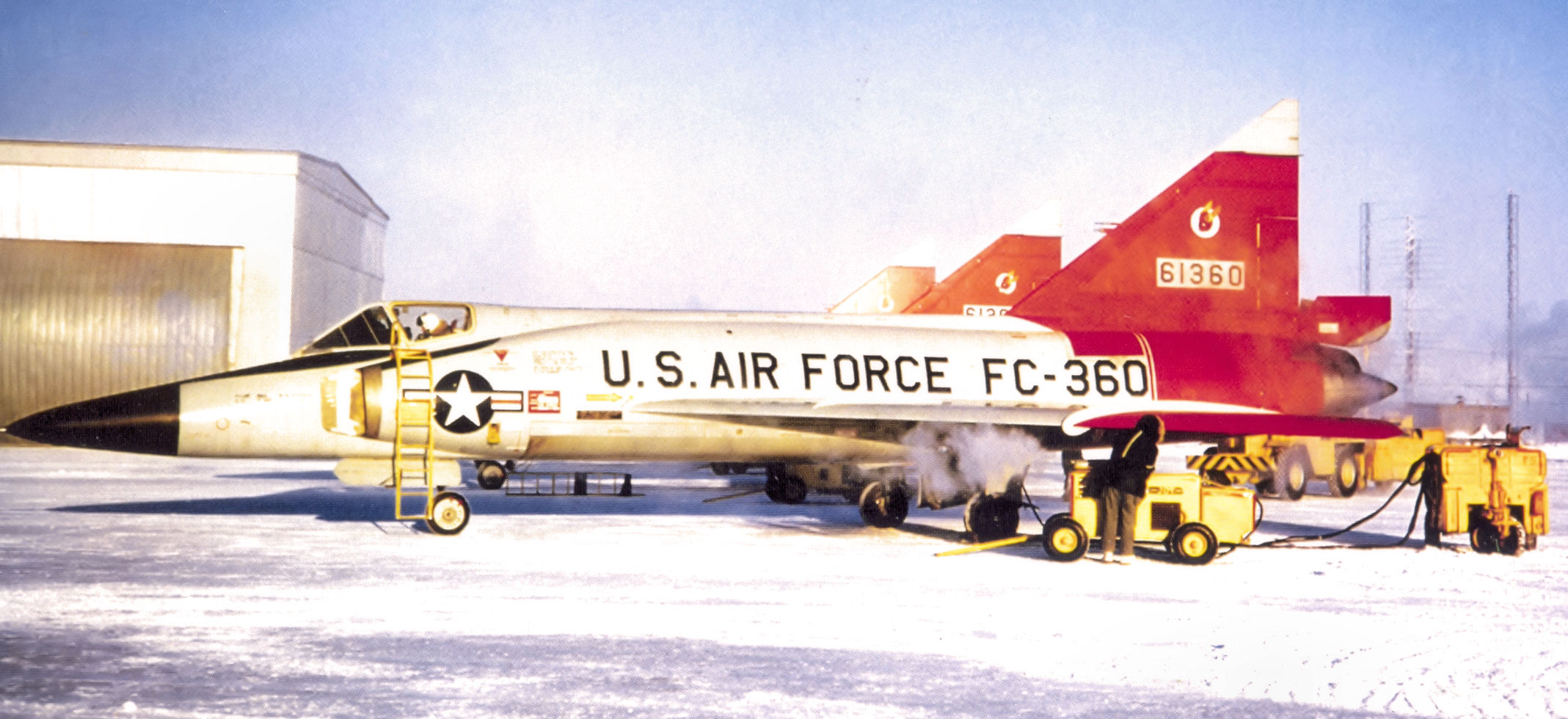
A United States Air Force F-102 interceptor at Thule Air Base, 1958

A scholar wrote in 1950 that, despite official denials of the rumors of an American purchase, because of Greenland's large expense to Denmark and strategic importance, "the potential sale of the island to the United States remains a distinct possibility". Postwar Denmark was not able to defend Greenland, an ice-covered island 50 times larger than itself. In April 1951, Denmark and the United States signed the Greenland Defense Agreement. Replacing the 1941 agreement, it allows the latter country to keep its military bases in Greenland, and to establish new bases or "defense areas" if deemed necessary by NATO. The American military can freely use and move between these defense areas, but cannot infringe upon Danish sovereignty in Greenland. The agreement remains in force as long as the NATO treaty does. Denmark recognized that without the agreement Greenland would become closer to the United States anyway, whether as a nominally independent country or with a Puerto Rico-like affiliation. The Pentagon told president Dwight Eisenhower that the Danes were "very cooperative in allowing the United States quite a free hand in Greenland". A Danish scholar later wrote that his country's sovereignty over the island during the Cold War was fictional, with the United States holding de facto sovereignty.

The BBC wrote that the 1951 agreement "in effect, gave the US whatever it wanted". In 1955, the Joint Chiefs nonetheless proposed to Eisenhower that the nation again try to purchase Greenland, writing that "sovereignty provides the firmest basis of assuring that a territory and its resources will be available for military use when needed. United States sovereignty over Greenland would remove any doubt as to the unconditional availability of bases". The State Department responded "the time was long past when such a plan would be feasible", because Greenland was constitutionally and psychologically an integral part of Denmark. An attempt to acquire the island might endanger American access, and unnecessary because "we are permitted to do almost anything, literally, that we want to".

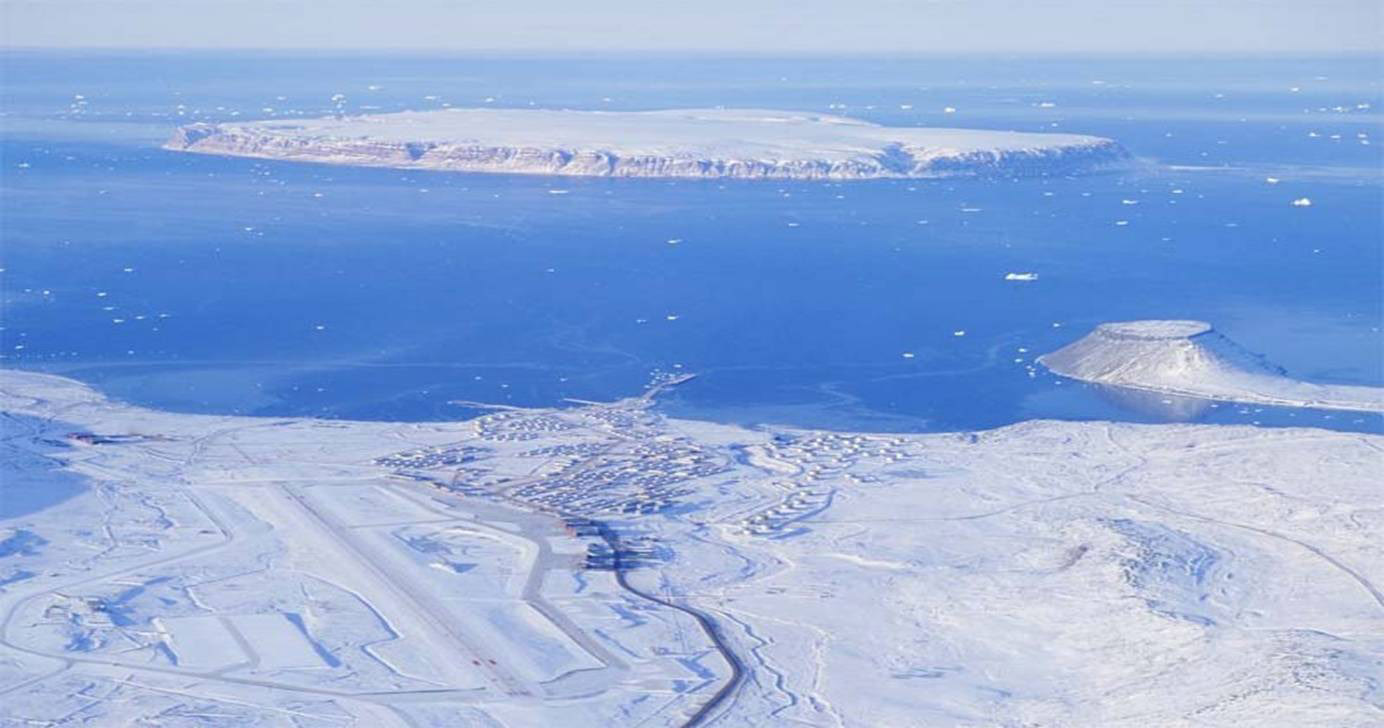
North Star Bay with Thule Air Base in the foreground. A nuclear accident occurred at North Star Bay in 1968 during the Cold War when a U.S. B-52 bomber carrying four thermonuclear bombs crashed, spreading contaminated material over the area.

Circa 1953, in Operation Blue Jay, the United States built Thule Air Base in northern Greenland. From 1959, the island was part of NORAD. Thule employed more than 1,000 Greenlanders and had almost 10,000 American personnel. It and about 50 other American bases performed duties such as tracking Soviet submarines in the GIUK gap. Camp Century was an experiment in polar engineering that presaged colonization of the Moon. The canceled Project Iceworm would have deployed 600 Minuteman missiles under the ice.

As the Portuguese Empire shrank, the Danish empire, with Greenland, became the world's largest. During the 1970s, vice president Nelson Rockefeller suggested buying Greenland for mining. The proposal was first publicly reported in 1982 by Rockefeller's speechwriter Joseph E. Persico in his book The Imperial Rockefeller. Writing in 1975, C.L. Sulzberger affirmed that it was the general American position that Greenland "must be covered by the Monroe Doctrine" and opined it was impossible for the island to function independently, stating that "25 percent of the islanders suffer from venereal disease" – the latter points to his inability or unwillingness to read health data correctly. In 1990, Patrick Buchanan suggested that American expansion to include Greenland was "not so wild a dream" and only required "patience".

United States interest abruptly declined after the Cold War; the NORAD radars were abandoned, "though Thule, the United States' northernmost air base houses the ...network of sensors, which provides early missile warning and space surveillance and control". and since 2004 Thule has been the only United States base, with a few hundred Americans. Post-Cold War United States disinterest in the island reportedly disappointed many Greenlanders; as late as 2004, proposals for American funding of climate research and scholarships did not succeed.

=== 21st century ===
The United States, Russia, and China increased their attention to Greenland and Arctic geopolitics in the early 21st century. American secretary of state Hillary Clinton and her Russian counterpart Sergey Lavrov attended the 2010 Arctic five meeting. Rasmus Nielsen said in 2019, "The last couple of years we can see a bigger focus and also involvement that the U.S. wants to have [in Greenland]. You can feel that the U.S. is really waking up to Arctic reality—partly because of Russia, partly because of China".

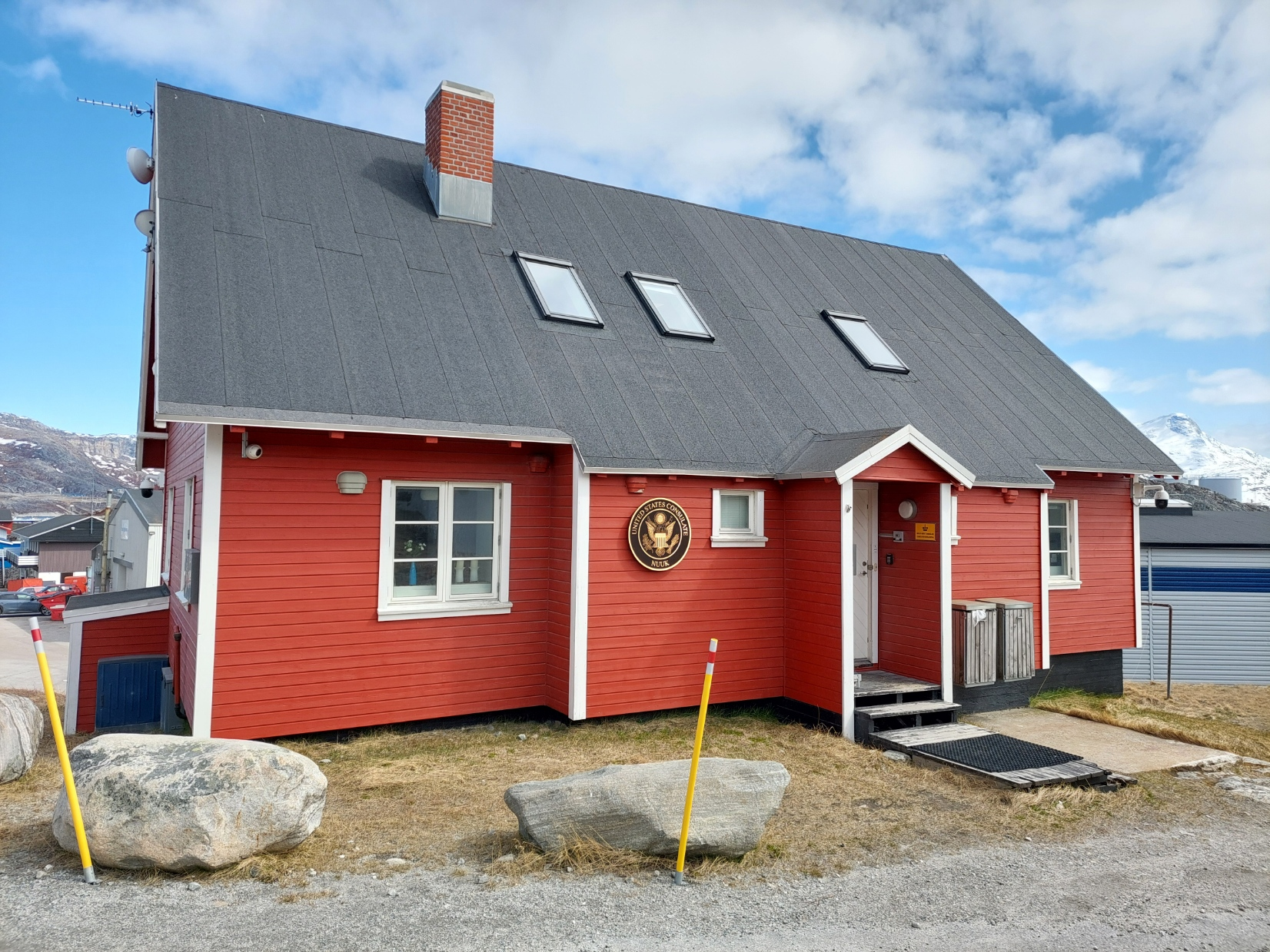
In 2020, the United States opened a consulate in Greenland (pictured) for the first time in more than 60 years.

The island is still important to American and NATO security; Walter Berbrick of the Naval War College said in 2019, "Whoever holds Greenland will hold the Arctic. It's the most important strategic location in the Arctic and perhaps the world". The United States emphasizes Greenland's North American geography, and American diplomatic and military officials and the United States Geological Survey (USGS) often visit the island. In 2018 the Americans reestablished the United States Second Fleet, responsible for the North Atlantic; Berbrick proposed basing the fleet in Greenland, and Under Secretary of Defense for Policy John Rood signed an agreement to invest in dual-use infrastructure. Henrik Breitenbauch of the University of Copenhagen said that the agreement, which Greenland welcomed, was part of increasing American emphasis on defending North America. The island could be where the United States builds the new strategic Arctic port that the National Defense Authorization Act for Fiscal Year 2020 mandates.

In 2019, Greenland asked the United States for an aerial survey. Planned before but occurring after the Trump administration purchase proposal, the United States Navy used hyperspectral imaging over Garðar and the USGS interpreted the data to search for mineral resources. Greenland, in April 2020, accepted a $12.1 million American grant. In December 2019, Denmark approved a Trump administration request for a consulate in Greenland. Opened during World War II and closed in 1953, the consulate reopened in June 2020, a day after the administration announced that it would build a new icebreaker fleet. Nick Solheim of the Wallace Institute for Arctic Security said that the two acts "are the most monumental things we've done in Arctic policy in the last 40 years".

=== Proposals by Donald Trump ===
Since 2019, during his first term and increasingly since being elected for his second term, Donald Trump has repeatedly asserted the claim that the United States should be in control of Greenland. He reportedly views an expanded United States as both vital to national security, and a way to strengthen his historical legacy as president akin to how predecessor William McKinley acquired new territory for the United States.

==== First presidency ====
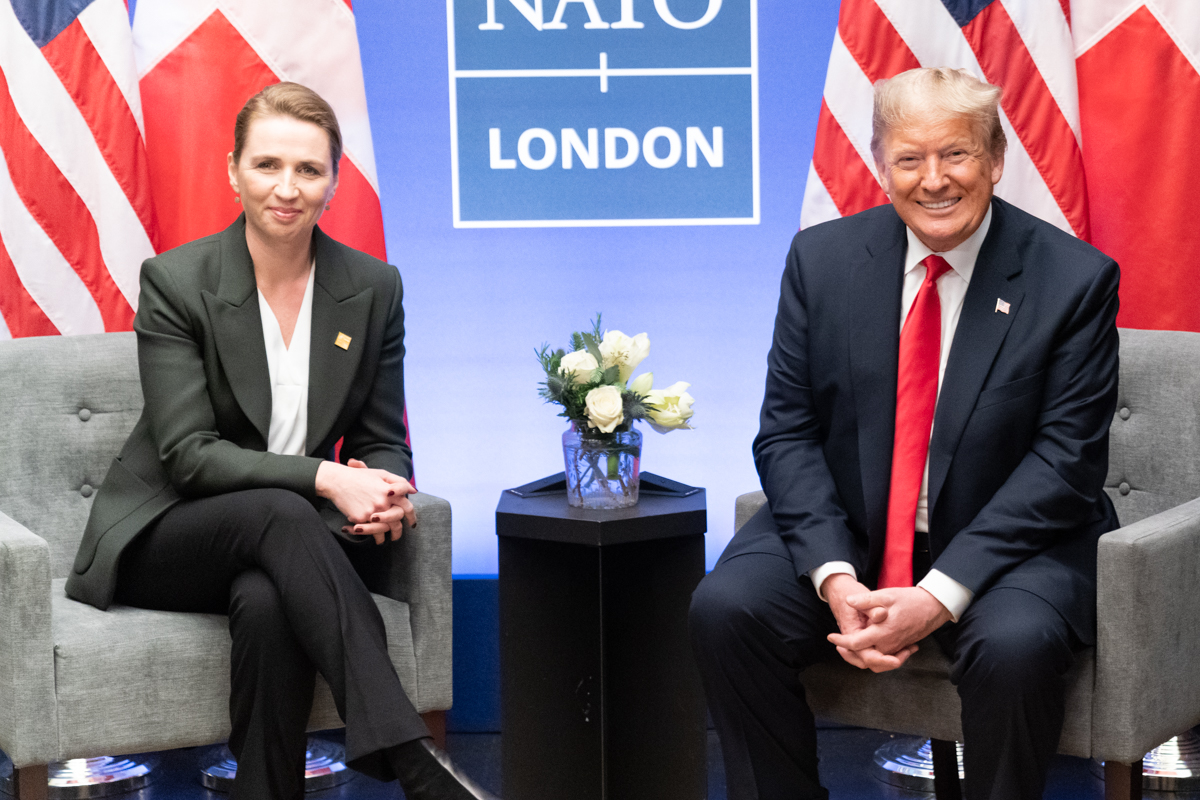
In August 2019, Trump canceled his state visit to Denmark over Mette Frederiksen's (left) remarks that called the possibility of purchasing Greenland "absurd".

Trump has reportedly discussed acquiring Greenland since 2017. During his first presidency, Ron Lauder suggested to Trump that the United States purchase Greenland and offered to act as a back channel to the Danish government. Trump later claimed the idea was his personal inspiration, and tasked National Security Advisor John Bolton to study it. Bolton tasked Fiona Hill to work on the proposal, assembled a small team to discuss options, and engaged in secret talks with Denmark's ambassador. Trump repeatedly suggested taking federal money for Puerto Rico to buy Greenland, and discussed trading the island for the territory. Trump later told New York Times journalists Peter Baker and Susan Glasser in an interview for their book, The Divider, that he was enamored by the deal for the size of the island, and thought it was a great real estate deal that would secure his place in history.

Trump discussed the idea of purchasing Greenland with senior advisers, and also with Senator Tom Cotton, who proposed buying the island to Danish ambassador Lars Gert Lose in August 2018. Australian geologist Greg Barnes discussed the island's rare earths with 20 administration officials at the White House in July 2019. Supporters of an acquisition, including the Bureau of Oceans and International Environmental and Scientific Affairs, reportedly discussed expanding American partnership with the island, including a possible purchase. One official stated that the United States can subsidize Greenland for much more than Denmark can; as of January 2020, the subsidy is less than the annual budget of El Paso, Texas. Cotton said that he suggested the purchase to the president because of the island's importance to American national security and great economic potential.

When The Wall Street Journal reported on Trump's discussions in August 2019, Premier of Greenland Kim Kielsen, Greenland's minister of foreign affairs Ane Lone Bagger, Greenlandic representatives in the Parliament of Denmark, Prime Minister of Denmark Mette Frederiksen, previous prime minister and opposition leader Lars Løkke Rasmussen, and members of other parties all rejected a sale. Statements ranged from simple diplomatic comments to strong refusals calling the idea of a sale of Greenland and its people "completely ridiculous". Some suggested that Trump's proposal had to be a joke. Frederiksen, already in Greenland, said it was "an absurd discussion", as "Greenland is not for sale. Greenland is not Danish. Greenland is Greenlandic". The prime minister emphasized Denmark's desire to continue close Denmark–United States relations, stating that she was open to increasing the American military presence.

On 20 August 2019, Trump canceled a planned state visit of the United States to Denmark over Frederiksen's remarks rejecting the possibility of a sale. The cancellation came shortly after Carla Sands, the American ambassador, tweeted that "Denmark is ready for the POTUS @realDonaldTrump visit! Partner, ally, friend" and reportedly surprised and bewildered the Danish government. The Danish government quickly communicated its support of American policy, including in the Arctic; the following day, Frederiksen invited "stronger cooperation" with the United States on Arctic affairs. After reiterating that Greenland was not for sale, Frederiksen repeated her statement about the importance of the United States alliance in English to ensure that American officials heard her words. The Danish attempt to placate the larger country apparently worked; later that day, United States secretary of state Mike Pompeo phoned Danish foreign minister Jeppe Kofod, praising the Danish–American cooperation in the Arctic region and the alliance between the two countries. Both also confirmed their intentions of strengthening the cooperation in the region. Danish analyst Kristian Mouritzen said that Pompeo helped Frederiksen "smooth things out with Trump", averting what was "becoming a very big problem for Denmark".

A diplomat in Beijing said that Trump was likely thinking of China when he offered to purchase Greenland. According to Bo Lidegaard, the president's interest underscored a long established reality dating back to 1941, namely that the United States has no intention of withdrawing from Greenland, a situation that neither Greenland nor Denmark has the power to change. He added that this reflects a world in which the strongest actors ultimately prevail, and that alternatives involving China or Russia would be worse. Andreas Bøje Forsby of the University of Copenhagen said that Trump's interest was "a very clear signal to both China and Denmark that Greenland is part of an exclusive American strategic zone". Admiral Nils Wang, former head of the Royal Danish Navy, said "Trump's approach may be wacky but it does send a serious message to Russia and China—don't mess with us on Greenland. This is a complete game-changer".

American purchase supporters do not mention the Greenlandic independence movement in official documents to avoid annoying the Danish. Due to the fact that the island can declare independence, it can affiliate with the United States. "The only way Trump would be able to buy Greenland would be to give them an offer they couldn't turn down", Ulrik Pram Gad of Aalborg University said. Jon Rahbek-Clemmensen of the Royal Danish Defence College predicted difficult negotiations for Denmark. He expected the island to seek diplomatic and financial benefits from Denmark and the United States, and Greenland and the United States possibly to negotiate bilaterally. Agreeing that they should negotiate without Denmark, The London Globalist suggested that "The United States should make clear that ... this [subsidy] will be enlarged enormously, however blunt and unseemly this instrument may be".

Islanders could use the possibility of American affiliation when negotiating with Denmark, said Thorsten Borring Olesen of Aarhus University. Poul Krarup, editor-in-chief of Sermitsiaq, said that the American interest started a new domestic debate that might result in the island becoming more autonomous or independent from Denmark. He said that Greenlanders do not want to sell to the United States but want to cooperate as an equal partner, suggesting that Trump visit the island instead of Denmark to negotiate. While a majority of Greenlanders prefer Denmark to the United States, most prefer the latter to China. Another Greenlander hoped that Trump's interest would cause Denmark to "wake up and show Greenland some respect. A lot of Danes think everyone here is just a drunk Inuit. But now that America wants to buy us, maybe they can see there is much of value here". A third said that "for hundreds of years [Danes] earned many, many billions of kroner from Greenland" while neglecting Greenlanders, and hoped that the American attention would give them more power when negotiating with Denmark.

Krarup said that Greenlanders were also angry at Denmark for discussing Greenland without them. While Trump needed to "change [his] attitude", Krarup hoped that the president's interest would change the island's political situation. Among Greenlandic politicians, Folketing MP Aaja Chemnitz said that the Danish government was already treating her island differently because of Trump. Frederiksen's "Greenland is not Danish. Greenland is Greenlandic" statement was, Gad said, the first time a Danish prime minister said that the island had some control over foreign or security issues. Pele Broberg of Partii Naleraq stated that with the American willingness to replace the Danish subsidy, Greenland had an alternative to Danish disinterest in Greenlandic independence. While rejecting a purchase he said that Denmark was not better than the United States, which already can do what it wants in Greenland. He proposed that the island begin the process in Danish law of becoming independent, and negotiate directly with the United States for American military and financial support. Steen Lynge of the Democrats agreed, stating that Greenland should use Trump's offer to become independent of the Danish subsidy.

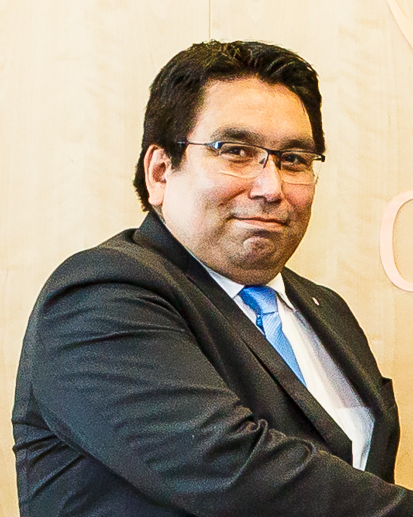
Greenland's finance minister Vittus Qujaukitsoq (pictured) was accused by Danish MP Søren Espersen of bypassing Denmark and engaging in secret negotiations with U.S. officials over the future of the island.

Tillie Martinussen of the Cooperation Party disagreed with replacing the Danish subsidy with another country's, and warned of risks to the island's education and health care with a United States affiliation. Describing Broberg's proposal as inappropriate, Siumut stated that Greenland needed to become independent without any subsidy, and that the island should cooperate more with Denmark and the United States. The Atassut Party said that remaining within the Danish Kingdom was preferable, with the subsidy, other Danish assistance, and Folketing representation among benefits Greenland would lose with an American affiliation. Søren Espersen of the Danish People's Party called Broberg naive for wanting to leave the kingdom, stating that "the United States will swallow Greenland in a single mouthful" after independence and would not replace the Danish subsidy. Former foreign minister Martin Lidegaard of the Danish Social Liberal Party also advised against Greenland negotiating for an American subsidy, as "the United States is not a type of nation that gives something for free". Aqqaluk Lynge—former head of the Inuit Circumpolar Conference—opposed affiliating with the United States, describing the offer as an attack on Danish sovereignty and Greenlandic independence.

Islanders hoped that the publicity from Trump's interest would increase outside investment and tourism in Greenland. A real-estate company in Nuuk reported that international inquiries rose from one or two a year to 10 in the week after Trump's proposal. Krarup said that the president had "done us a service; he has made Greenland known throughout the world. The best advertisement we could get". The island needs American investment and subsidy for airports, roads, and United States air routes, Krarup said, which would also make Greenland more independent from Denmark. After the president joked that he would not build a Trump Tower there, Nordic travel agencies saw significantly more interest in tourism on the island; Krarup said that Greenlanders enjoyed the joke and interpreted it as Trump saying that he does not want to destroy Greenlandic culture. Greenland's tourism bureau listed Trump's offer and previous American interest in the island on its website.

Martin Lidegaard, Weekendavisen, Breitenbauch, and Hans Mouritzen of the Danish Institute for International Studies were among those who said that Trump forced Denmark to not ignore Greenland as usual, and imagine the two apart. Kielsen and Frederiksen likely will support additional American bases; Breitenbauch said that because the United States is his country's most important security partner, he described as a nightmare for Denmark the possibility of Trump demanding it choose between fulfilling the Wales Summit Declaration of defense spending as 2% of GDP, or keeping Greenland. Whether the island is independent or affiliated with Denmark or America, Breitenbauch said, the United States would continue military supremacy and to restrict foreign investments that affect national security.

Reopening its consulate increased American influence on islanders, and was consistent with Cain's 2007 proposal for directly communicating with Greenland. Vice President of the United States Mike Pence said that reopening it was "the culmination of the administration's efforts to strengthen our engagement in the Arctic region". Chemnitz said in October 2019 that the consulate was part of "a massive charm offensive from the US and 'soft power' in diplomacy", and that because of Danish neglect of its responsibilities in Greenland, a majority on the island might support American annexation in five to ten years. Espersen in November accused Greenlandic finance minister Vittus Qujaukitsoq of secret bilateral negotiations with American officials, defying Danish authority over foreign and security policy. As part of the "American charm offensive" ambassadors since Cain in 2007 had, Espersen said, "methodically prepared for the day when Greenland declares itself independently—so that the US could move in on the island at the same time". He asked Greenland to choose between Denmark and the United States. Qujaukitsoq denied the claim and said that his schedule of American meetings was public. While criticizing Espersen for distrusting the island's officials, Martin Lidegaard said that the United States had "aggressive interest in ... Greenland and the Arctic".

During a 2021 interview, Trump said that following The Wall Street Journal's public leak of the proposal in August 2019, the Danish government "lost their political courage". Tom Dans, a Trump appointee to the United States Arctic Research Commission, said in 2025 that he worked on Greenland until the last day of the first Trump administration.

==== Second presidency ====
===== November 2024 to March 2025 =====
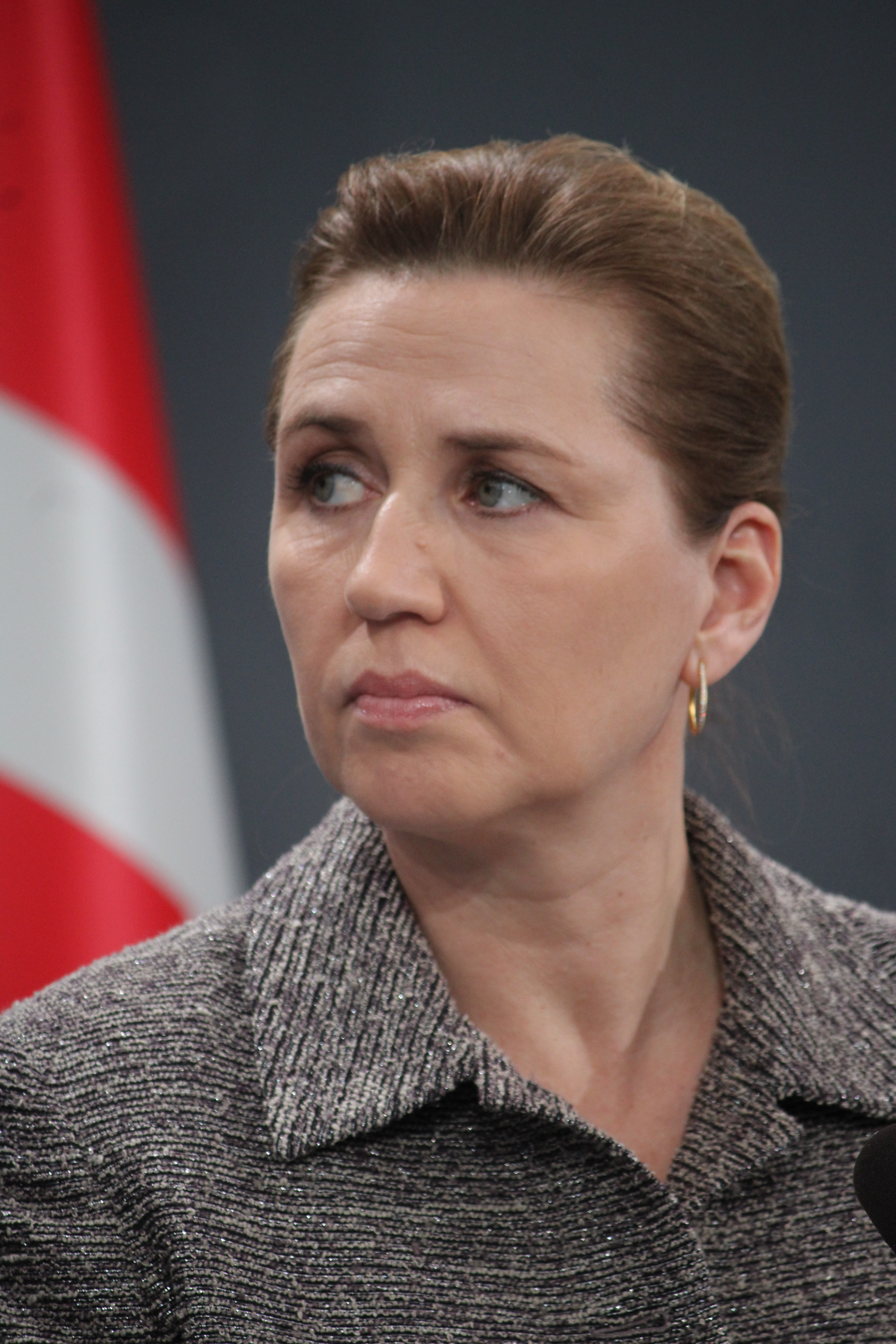
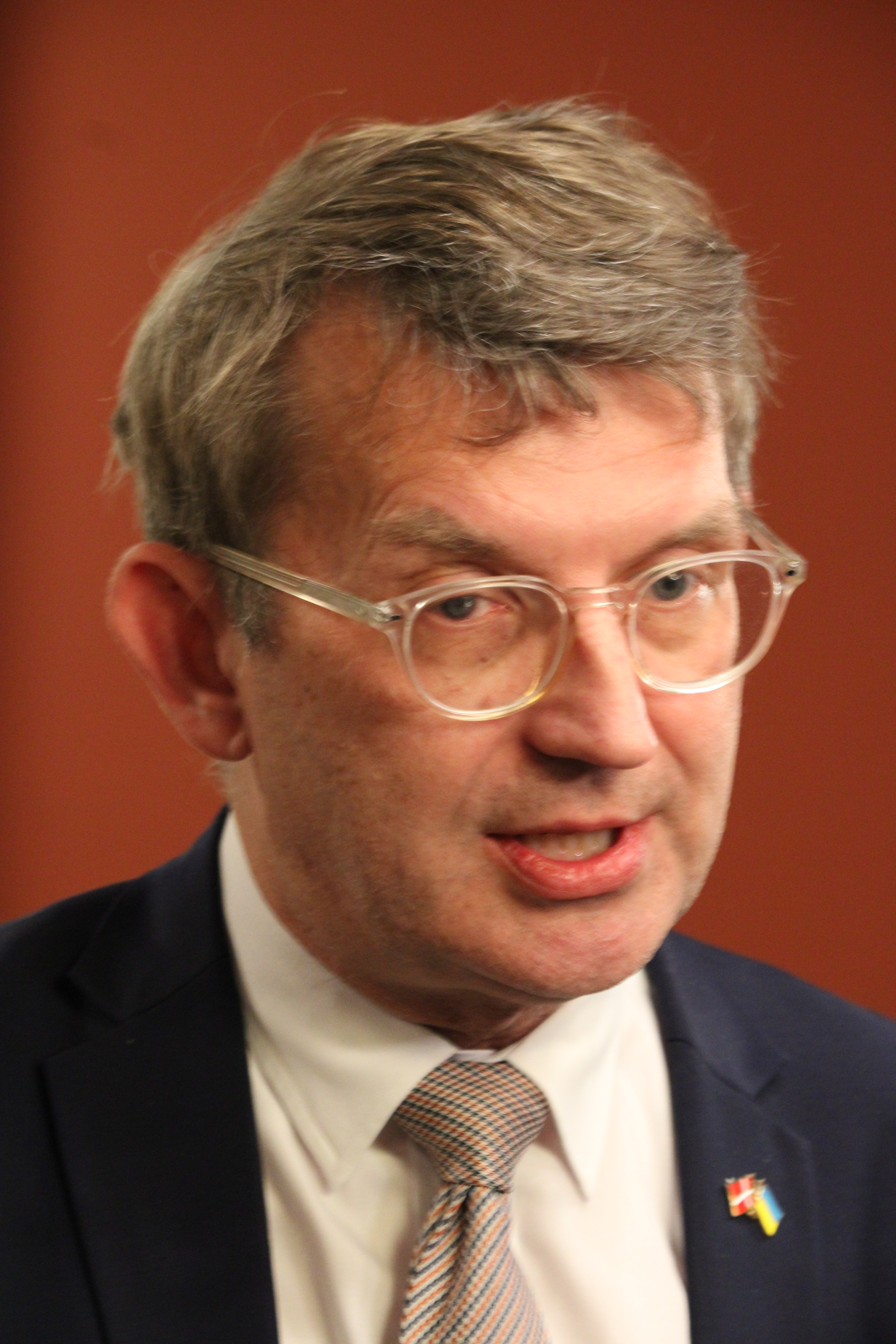
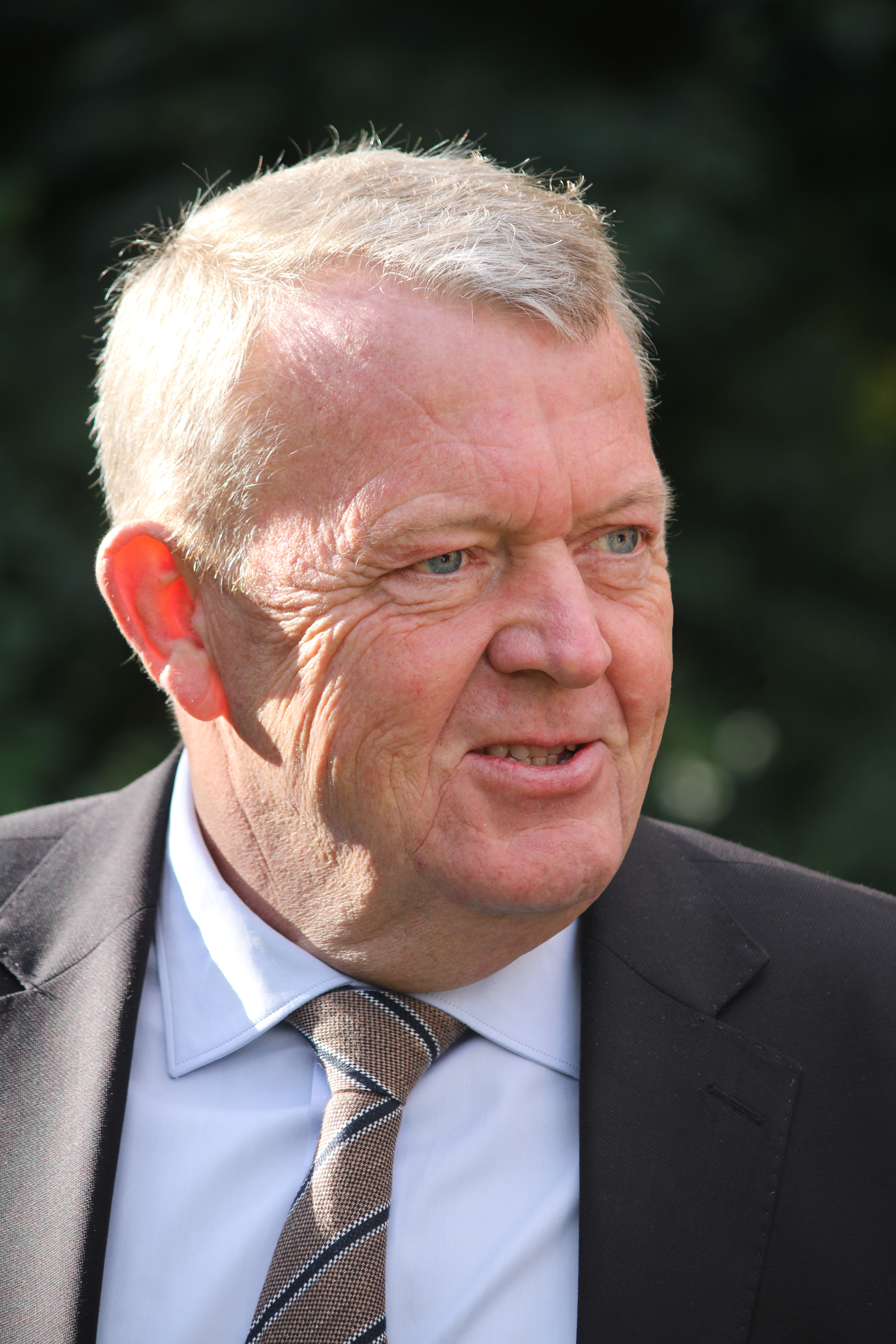
Prime Minister Mette Frederiksen, Defence Minister Troels Lund Poulsen, and Foreign Minister Lars Løkke Rasmussen

The Biden administration encouraged Western mining investment in Greenland. In 2024, American and Danish officials repeatedly told geologist Barnes's company Tanbreez Mining, developer of the island's largest rare-earths deposit, not to sell the project to Chinese developers. Tanbreez sold the project to Critical Metals of the United States, reportedly for much less than what the Chinese offered. The U.S. pressure is akin to similar American efforts to block Chinese influence in Africa's copperbelt. A week before Trump's re-election in November 2024, Nick Solheim of American Moment, a group preparing for the transition, said that the proposal had been serious. He reportedly cited the Homestead Act, implying that the government would encourage American settlement of the island.

Voice of America coverage of Donald Trump's desire to acquire Greenland at the beginning of his second presidency in January 2025

Shortly after the election, Trump ally Representative Mike Collins posted a picture of Greenland in an electoral-college map as voting Republican in "Project 2029", suggesting Trump would make another bid to purchase Greenland during his second term. "Buying Greenland" appeared on a list of foreign policy goals that the incoming administration prepared after the election, and the transition team began discussing business opportunities in Greenland with private industry, including Critical Metals. Gad said that Greenland had discussed their relationship with the two previous American administrations and was aware that "the US will never leave".

On 22 December 2024, Trump posted to Truth Social that the United States' "ownership and control of Greenland is an absolute necessity", citing reasons of "national security" and "freedom throughout the world". He did so while announcing the appointment of Ken Howery as ambassador to Denmark; Howery previously served as United States ambassador to Sweden. Trump's son, Eric Trump, in a post on X (formerly Twitter) with the caption "We are so back !!! ", showed map outlines of the Panama Canal, Greenland and Canada as items in an Amazon shopping cart, along with an image of his father looking at his phone with the same screen open. Responding to these statements, Greenlandic premier Múte Bourup Egede wrote: "Greenland is ours. We are not for sale and will never be for sale. We must not lose our long struggle for freedom". Denmark's Frederiksen repeated her comments from 2019. Danish minister of defense Troels Lund Poulsen, following Trump's comments, announced an increase in spending on defense in Greenland of a "double-digit billion amount" in Krone (between $876mn and $8.7bn USD).

"People don't even know if Denmark has any legal right to it, but if they do, they should give it up, because we need it for national security".

— Donald Trump, Mar-a-Lago, 6 January 2025,

In his first speech of 2025, King Frederik X appeared to rebuke Trump's offers of owning Greenland, when he stated, "We are all united and each of us committed for the kingdom of Denmark, from the Danish minority in South Schleswig and all the way to Greenland. We belong together". The royal household also ordered the changing of the Royal Arms of Denmark to include Greenland more significantly in the arms. After Trump's Christmas message on Greenland, Greenlandic minister of finance Erik Jensen invited the president-elect to the island (as Siumut chairman, and not on behalf of the government). On 7 January, Donald Trump Jr. arrived in Greenland, but did not meet with Jensen or the Greenlandic government. His guide was Jørgen Boassen, a pro-Trump islander who intends to run in the April 2025 election on a pro-United States platform, although he also stated his opposition to American acquisition of Greenland.

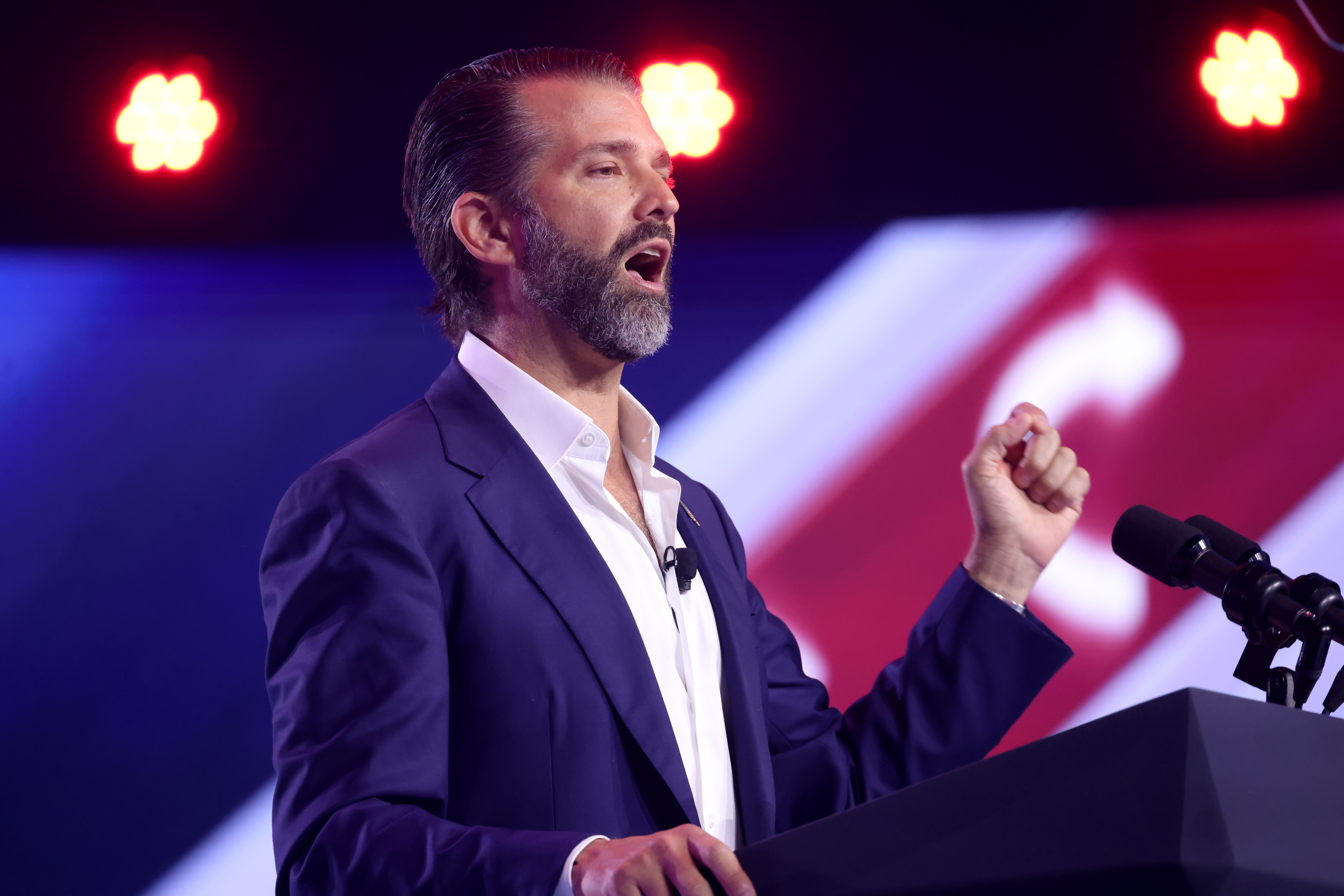
Donald Trump Jr. in 2025

Trump Jr. arrived ahead of his father's press conference in Florida where Trump announced that he would institute "very high" tariffs against Denmark if it resisted attempts to make Greenland a U.S. territory, questioned the legal status of Danish sovereignty in Greenland, and refused to rule out economic or military action against Denmark if they refused, citing national and economic security reasons. Egede urged calm among Greenlanders: "The announcements yesterday are of course worrying. However, it is necessary that we as a nation do not act hastily". Trump might use the International Emergency Economic Powers Act of 1977 to raise tariffs on Danish goods, such as Novo Nordisk's drug Ozempic; a 2024 study estimated that the GDP of Denmark would decline by 3% if the United States imposed 10% tariffs on European Union imports. Conversely, a deal with Denmark over Greenland might include favorable Medicare and Medicaid treatment for Danish pharmaceuticals. On 16 January, the CEOs of major Danish companies Novo Nordisk, Vestas and Carlsberg, among others, assembled for a crisis meeting in the Ministry of State to discuss the situation.

Trump Jr.'s arrival in Nuuk was greeted by a crowd of local residents, some of whom were opposed to annexation but attended because "it's exciting to have visitors from America". Donald Trump telephoned a luncheon Trump Jr. had at Hotel Hans Egede with local Nuuk residents, including homeless and otherwise socially vulnerable residents and a Nuuk drug dealer, in which he proclaimed that Greenland "is a very special place" and that the United States would "treat you well". Employees of the Brugseni supermarket affirmed that Trump Jr.'s public relations team distributed MAGA hats to people outside the supermarket and offered these people a free lunch at the hotel, and that several of these people appeared in Trump Jr.'s promotional picture of his visit; one local attendee said that Trump Jr.'s team had invited him to eat at the best local restaurant. Trump Jr. said that Danes were racist toward Greenlanders and treated them poorly, agreeing with Chemnitz and Løkke. On 14 January, the Trump-affiliated Nelk Boys also visited Godthåb, handing out dollar bills to locals.

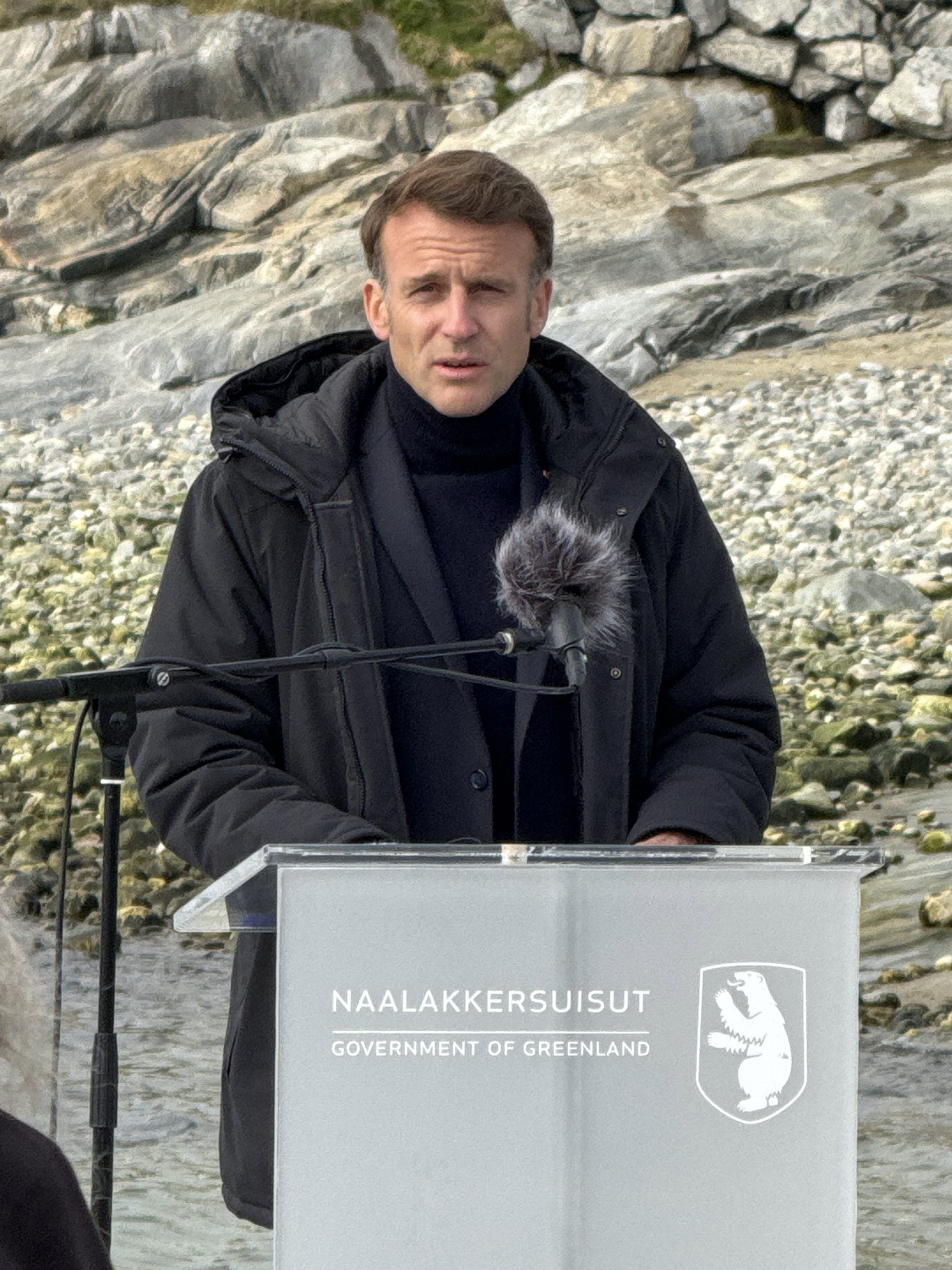
Emmanuel Macron speaking at a press conference in Nuuk on 15 June 2025

Frederiksen's priority is maintaining good relations with the Americans, because of the "Greenland map" barter that has been vital to her country's security for 80 years, and because the United States is Denmark's largest trading partner. She requested an audience with Trump. Her government privately reiterated to Trump aides that the island is not for sale, but that it will discuss increasing the United States military presence or any other request. Denmark wants to convince Trump that the United States does not need to possess Greenland. On 15 January, Frederiksen and Trump held a 45-minute phone conversation, whereafter Frederiksen stated: "There is no reason to believe ... Trump to not be serious in his statements about his increasing interest in Greenland". Two days later, foreign minister Lars Løkke Rasmussen told Politiken: "It's not as if I think it was good that she had that conversation, because then that problem is solved". The Financial Times reported that "Five current and former senior European officials briefed on the call said the conversation had gone very badly". One said "The intent was very clear. They want [Greenland]", and another said "the Danes are utterly freaked out about this". Trump reportedly threatened, according to the sources, "targeted tariffs" against Denmark. Frederiksen's office said it did "not recognise the interpretation of the conversation given by anonymous sources".

United States senator John Fetterman said that, while he opposed "taking it [Greenland] by force", acquisition along the same model used for the Louisiana Purchase or the Alaska Purchase would be a "reasonable conversation" to have. Senator Dan Sullivan of Alaska said to buy Greenland "if the price is right", but that his state "offers all of Greenland's benefits". Jared Polis, the governor of Colorado, was open to the proposal "if it's the choice of the people of Greenland". Bolton said that, while he supported the ultimate objective of United States annexation of Greenland, he disagreed with the way Trump was handling it and felt it needed a more sensitive and delicate approach. While reiterating that the island's goal was independence, Greenlandic parliament member Kuno Fencker said that a COFA with the United States and Denmark was possible, stating that "Greenland's economy needs to be diversified ... So Donald Trump Junior, and even his father and other (members of the incoming) administration from the US are extremely welcome here in Greenland as visitors ... and also maybe more officially in the future". Fencker and Boassen met with Dans when the latter arrived in Nuuk on 11 January. On 30 January 2025, U.S. Secretary of State Marco Rubio confirmed that when Trump said he wanted to buy Greenland, it was "not a joke." Trump believed that Denmark would eventually give in.

Statements by Trump and American officials prompted what the Copenhagen Post described as "widespread concern" in Denmark. Frederiksen met with opposition leaders on 9 January to discuss the crisis. Opposition MP Rasmus Jarlov criticized her stance that "Greenland belongs to the Greenlanders" and had control over its future, saying that Frederiksen should have more emphatically stated that Denmark opposed U.S. annexation of Greenland. All left parties in the Danish parliament support Greenlandic independence, while the right is divided. Denouncing "Greenlandic fantasists", the Danish People's Party leader Morten Messerschmidt said Greenlanders would prefer Denmark's social programs to those of the United States: "Greenland will never gain independence. We might as well say that. Greenland will never, ever get independence", he said, adding that Trump would have to negotiate with Denmark, not Greenland. On 14 January, Messerschmidt took part in a pro-Israeli conference held at Mar-a-Lago, but did not succeed in meeting Trump on the matter, instead talking to his former wife Marla Maples.

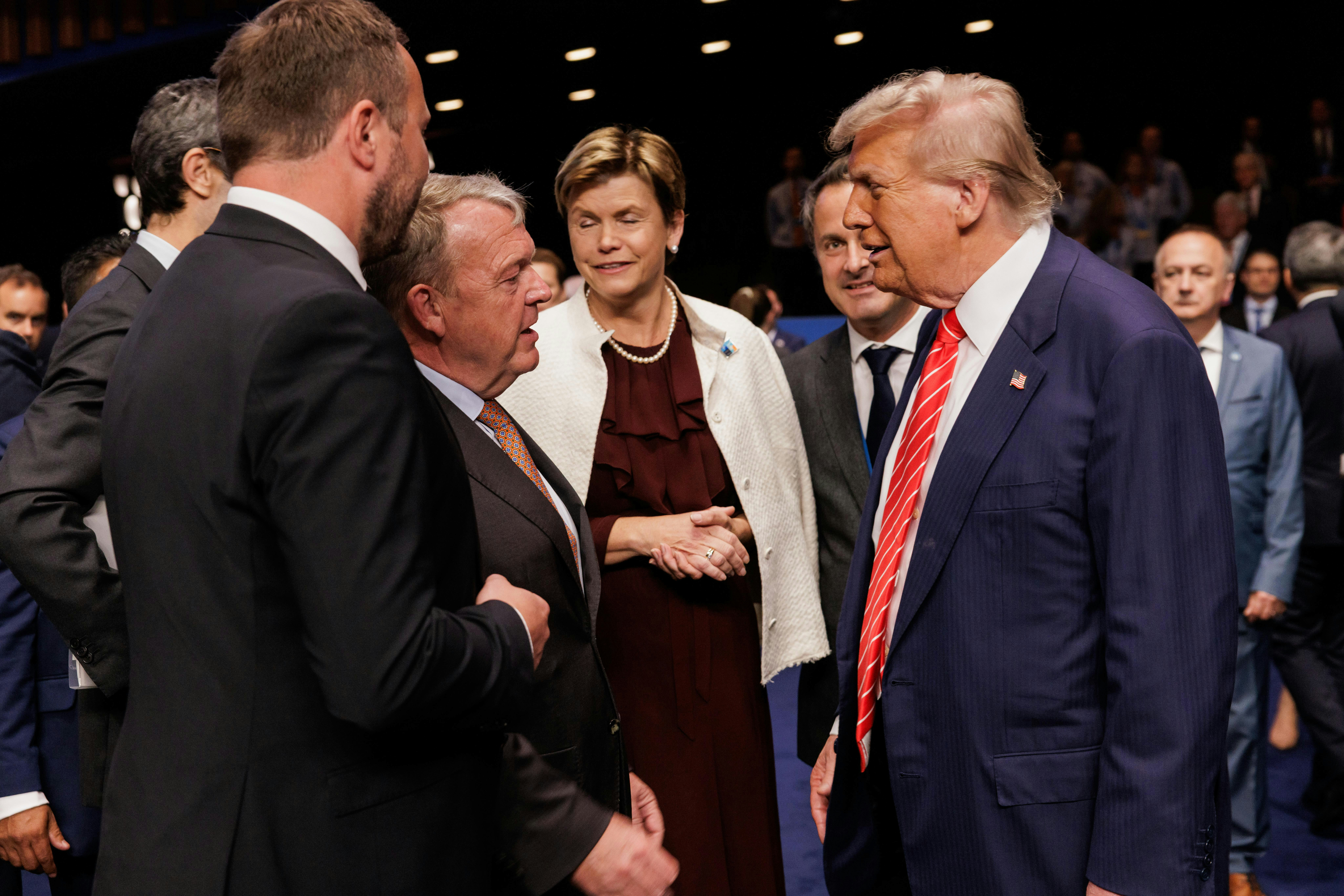
President Donald Trump and Danish foreign minister Lars Løkke Rasmussen at NATO summit in The Hague, 25 June 2025

The Red-Green Alliance said that Denmark should suspend a 2023 agreement allowing American troops on Danish soil. A spokesman for Frederiksen's Social Democrats rejected doing so, stating that the United States was vital to NATO and Danish security. Speaking on 17 January, former chief executive Friis Arne Petersen in the Danish Ministry of Foreign Affairs described the situation as "historically unheard of", while Noa Redington, special adviser to former prime minister Helle Thorning-Schmidt, compared the international pressure on Denmark to that during the Jyllands-Posten Muhammad cartoons controversy in 2005.

The Trump offer gave Greenland the ability to use the United States and Denmark against each other. Jacob Kaarsbo, formerly with the Danish Defence Intelligence Service, said "Trump is absolutely capitalizing on Greenland's push for independence. I can easily see a scenario where Greenland moves away from Denmark after the upcoming elections". Peter Viggo Jakobsen of the University of Southern Denmark said that if Trump offered more money than the current Danish subsidy "I can easily imagine that a majority of the population will declare independence". Greenlandic cabinet minister Naaja Nathanielsen said that her government had for years sought more cooperation with the United States or European Union, and that she rarely spoke to Danish media about her island's natural resources, the forced IUD case, or separation of Greenlandic children and parents in Denmark. Her island would use the great Danish and worldwide attention from Trump's interest to settle the scandals, she said. Reiterating that "We are not Danes, nor Americans", Nathanielsen asked for more American mining and infrastructure investment in a Washington Post op-ed, stating that Canadian and British companies held most licenses.

Gad said that Denmark might now be willing to continue subsidizing Greenland for some time after independence. On 9 January 2025, Trump wrote "The people of Greenland would love to become [an American state]. Denmark maybe doesn't like it. But then we can't be too happy with Denmark". While stating his opposition to joining the United States, Broberg said that Trump's interest in Greenland had confirmed the island's importance, and that other nations could help it become independent. Many Danish professionals on the island did not speak Greenlandic, he said, and that an independent Greenland would teach English instead of Danish: "Then it will not matter so much whether it is an American or an Englishman or a third person who speaks English who is going to be a doctor or a teacher. Then you will actually be able to communicate with each other". On 11 January leaders of all five parties in Inatsisartut (the Parliament of Greenland) refused the idea of becoming part of the US, though expressing an interest in maintaining a good relationship with the country.

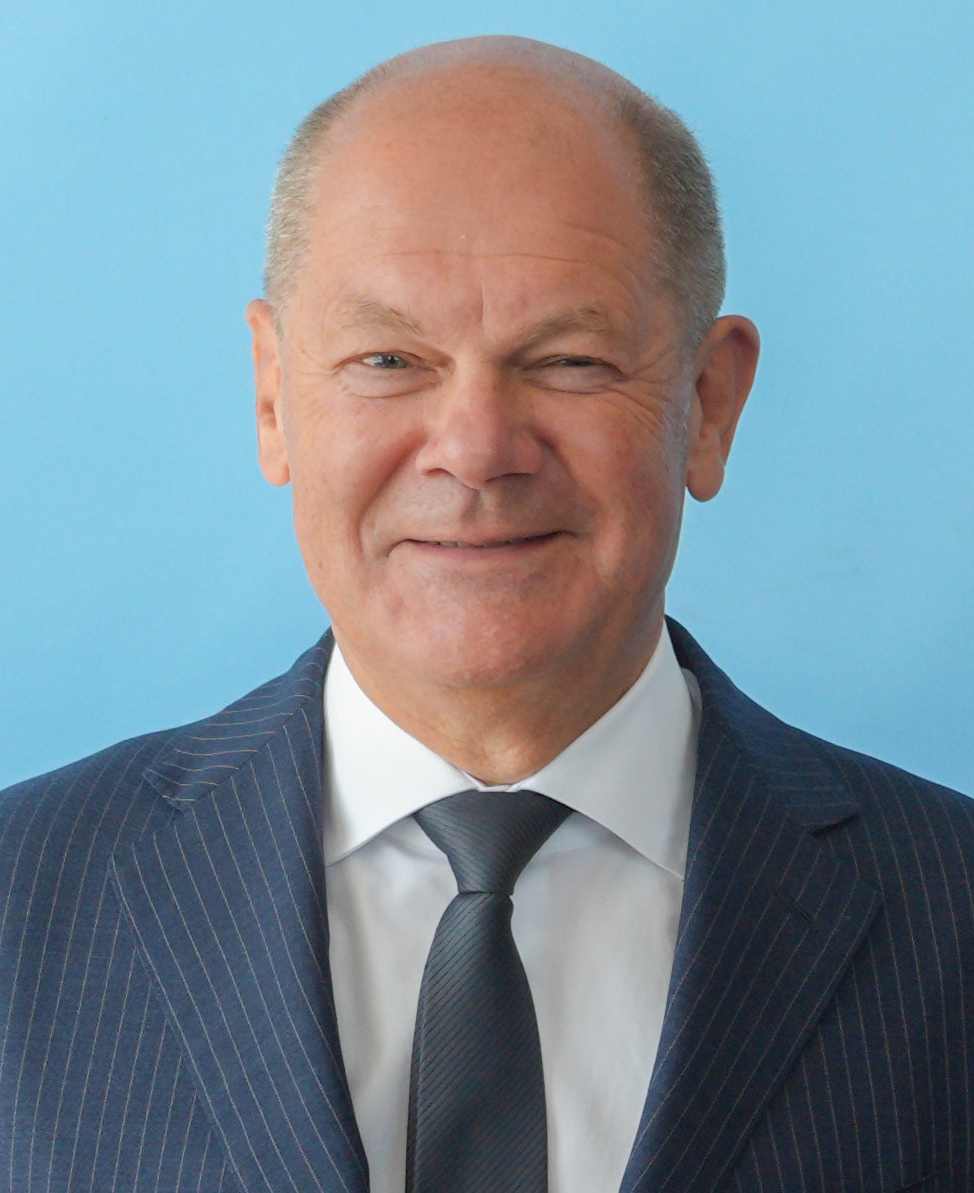

Borders must not be moved by force. This principle applies to every country, whether in the East or the West. In talks with our European partners, there is an uneasiness regarding recent statements from the US. It is clear: We must stand together.

— Olaf Scholz on 8 January 2025

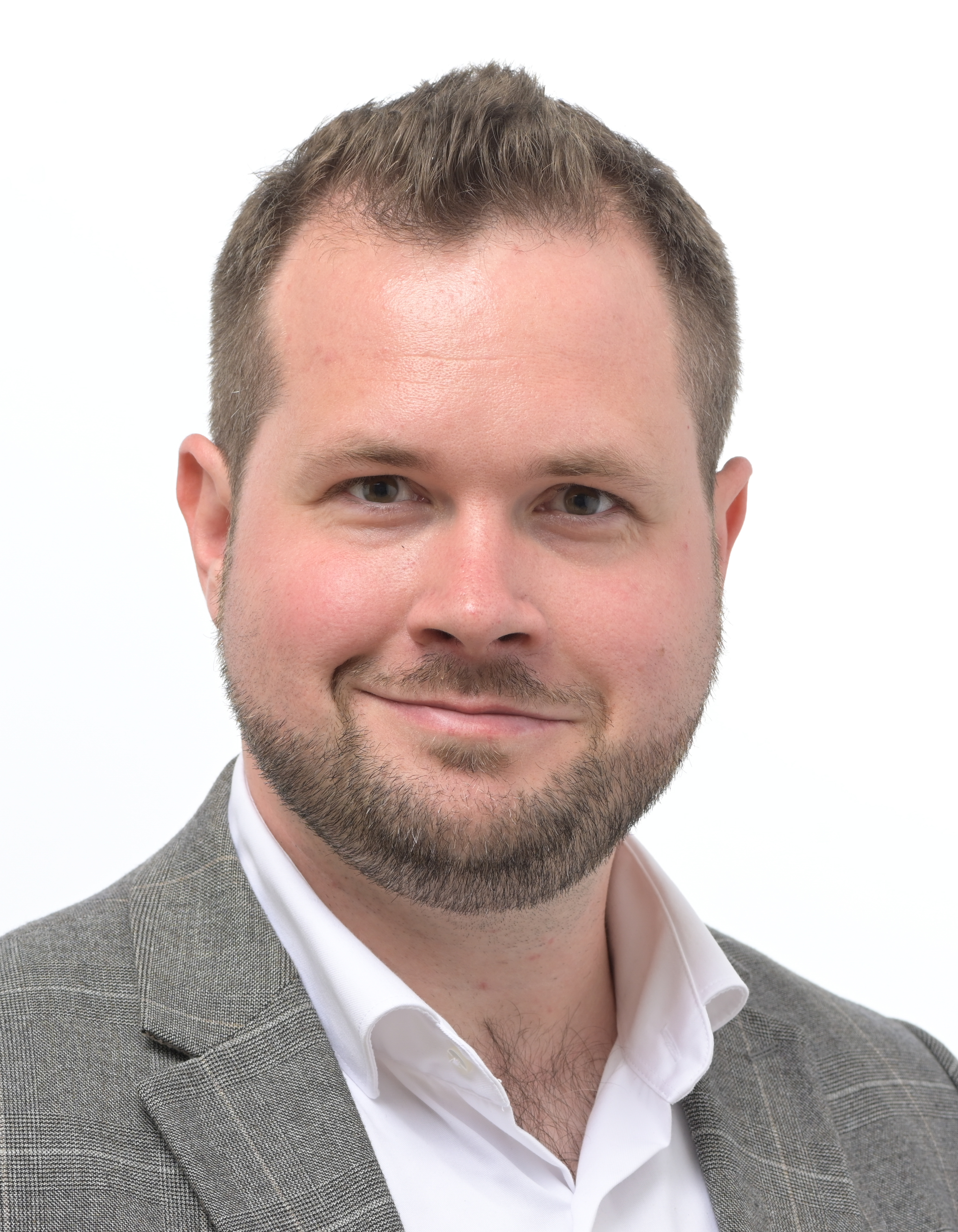

Dear President Trump,

Listen very carefully. Greenland has been part of the Danish kingdom for eight hundred years. It's an integrated part of our country. It is not for sale. Let me put it in words you might understand: Mr. Trump, fuck off.

— Statement by Anders Vistisen, a Danish member of the European Parliament from the Danish People's Party, in the European Parliament, 21 January 2025

Some European leaders expressed concern at Trump's increasing adamance in the annexation of Greenland. Speaking for the Russian Federation, Dmitry Peskov declared the Arctic "a zone of our national interests" and indicated Russia's opposition to changes in the status quo. French foreign minister Jean-Noël Barrot warned Trump against threatening the European Union's borders. Chancellor of Germany Olaf Scholz, in a post to X, stated "there is an uneasiness regarding recent statements from the US". Other figures, including Norwegian prime minister Jonas Gahr Støre, Swedish prime minister Ulf Kristersson, and UK foreign secretary David Lammy, reacted negatively to the acquisition wishes of the Trump administration. Jacques Hartmann of Dundee University Law School wrote that even if the Danish parliament voted against Greenlandic independence, Denmark could not stop secession because of the island's right to unilaterally declare independence, which the United States would likely recognize.

Greenlandic Premier Egede canceled a planned audience with Frederik X, scheduled to coincide with the date of Trump Jr.'s visit, in what officials attributed to a scheduling conflict but the Copenhagen Post noted was "not a normal occurrence". The meeting with the king was shortly after rescheduled and took place, four hours later than initially planned; royal historian Sebastian Olden-Jørgensen said that Egede rescheduled the meeting to prove that he did not "bow to Denmark". At a previously scheduled joint press conference on 10 January, Frederiksen and Egede said that the incoming Trump administration had not contacted either. "The status quo is not an option", the latter said: "Greenland is for the Greenlandic people. We do not want to be Danish, we do not want to be American. We want to be Greenlandic", but he understood America's strategic interest in his island. Egede said he wanted to be able to speak to a foreign leader without a Danish ambassador present. Elisabeth Svane of Politiken thought that Egede had recently become less strident, describing his tone as "yes, we want independence but in the long run". Back in Greenland, Mark Leibovich wrote that Egede seemed overwhelmed, regretting the sudden immense global interest Trump's interest had caused in him and his island.

Frederiksen described American interest in Greenland as positive, by causing the island and her country to reevaluate each other. She said that Greenlandic desire for independence was "legitimate and understandable" but that she wanted the island to remain within the kingdom. Gad stated that Frederiksen—unlike previous Danish governments—was not completely against a Danish COFA with Greenland. She might decide that, given the Trump discussion, a looser relationship with the island was better than completely losing Denmark's Arctic role, the scholar said. Dans and Boassen traveled to the United States on 13 January, having organized a Greenlandic delegation to the second inauguration of Donald Trump, while Broberg attended a watch party at parliament of Trump's inauguration speech formed in case the president would mention Greenland. He did not, but Broberg nonetheless welcomed Trump's interest, both for increasing the island's value and, Leibovich said, "freaking out Denmark". On 20 January, Trump reiterated threats, stating that there is "no going back" on his plan to annex Greenland, claiming "Greenland is imperative for national and world security". On 26 January Frederiksen had dinner with other Nordic leaders, and on 28 January she met with Scholz, President of France Emmanuel Macron, and NATO secretary-general Mark Rutte to discuss the crisis.

Citing the Northwest Passage, GIUK gap, and missile defense, General Philip Breedlove (USAF, Ret.) said "Guaranteeing a western-leaning Greenland is extremely important". While stating that the United States did not need to own the island to do so, and deploring the "rough public conversation" between the United States and Denmark, the former SACEUR said "It is incredibly important that we do not allow Russian and Chinese influence to grow". Admiral James Stavridis (USN, Ret.) said Greenland "is an immensely valuable piece of real estate" because of its strategic location, natural resources, and potential for post climate-change agriculture. Since he did not expect American acquisition of the island, and advised against independence, the former SACEUR proposed that the United States improve the island's infrastructure, police, military, and tourism. Gad, the author of Greenland in Arctic Security, said that while the GIUK gap and Pituffik are important for American national security, "neither the US nor Danish and Greenlandic authorities have so far found anything that warrants further military buildup in Greenland".

===== March 2025 to present =====
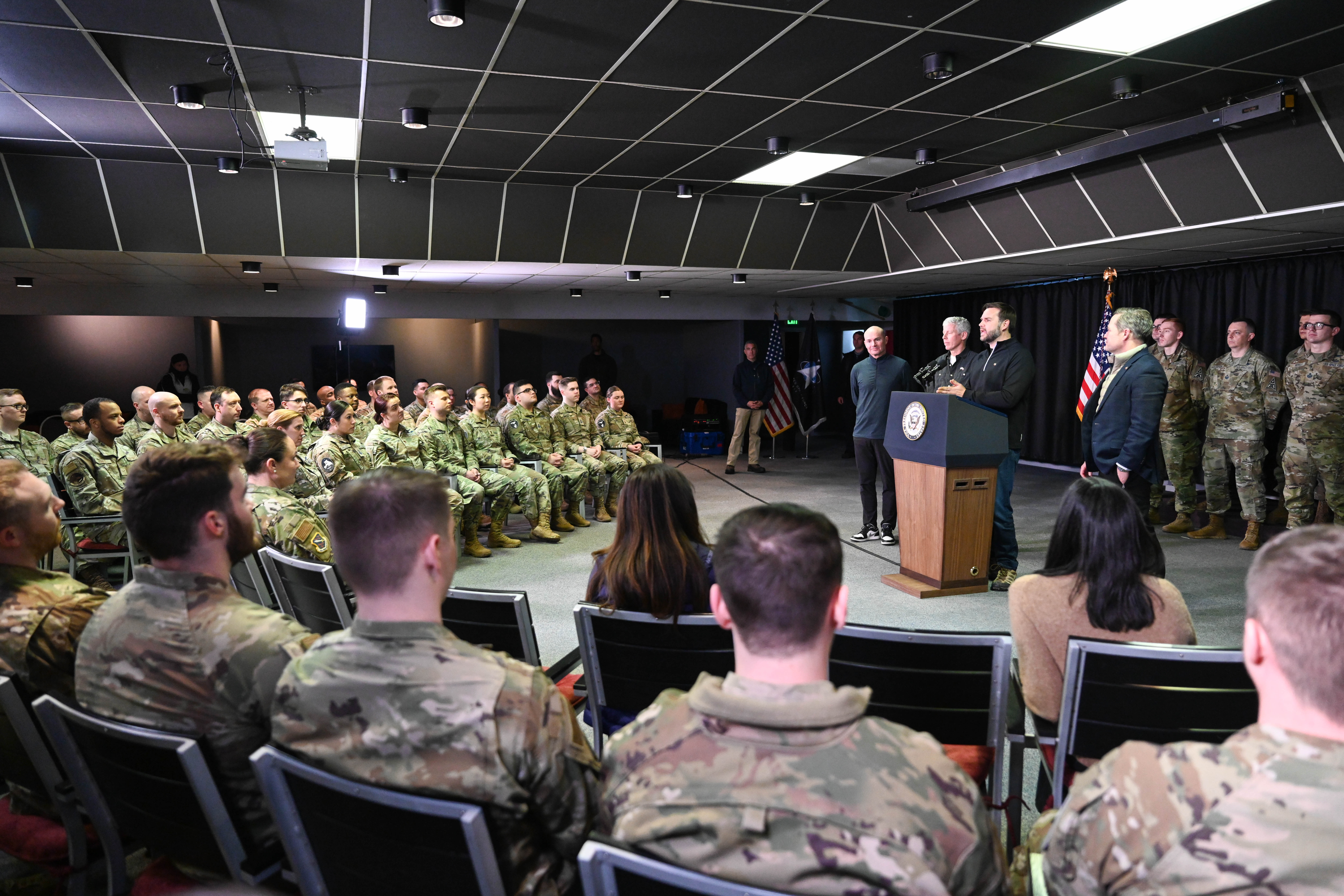
Vice President JD Vance at Pituffik Space Base in Greenland, 28 March 2025

During his speech to a joint session of Congress on 4 March 2025, Trump discussed the strategic importance of controlling Greenland and declared that "one way or the other, we're going to get it." In a 13 March 2025 meeting with NATO Sec. Gen. Rutte, Trump suggested that he would be working with NATO when annexing Greenland, which he said he thought would happen. Rutte responded saying that he wanted to "leave that [issue] outside... I do not want to drag NATO into that" while agreeing with Trump on the need for Arctic security cooperation. On 14 March 2025, Jens-Frederik Nielsen, the leader of the Greenland Democrats that won the most seats in the 2025 Greenlandic general election, called for a grand coalition to show unity in the face of American annexation threats. The same day, leaders of all five parties in the Inatsisartut issued a joint statement rejecting Trump's repeated comments about annexation. Denmark's prime minister Frederiksen also issued a statement supporting the Greenlandic leaders.

On 7 May 2025, the Danish government summoned the United States ambassador to Denmark following a Wall Street Journal report that officials working for Director of National Intelligence Tulsi Gabbard had ordered the heads of the Central Intelligence Agency, National Security Agency and Defense Intelligence Agency to collect intelligence on Greenland's independence movement and the attitudes to American resource extraction efforts in the territory. In response, Danish foreign minister Lars Løkke Rasmussen said: "It worries me a lot, because we don't spy between friends."

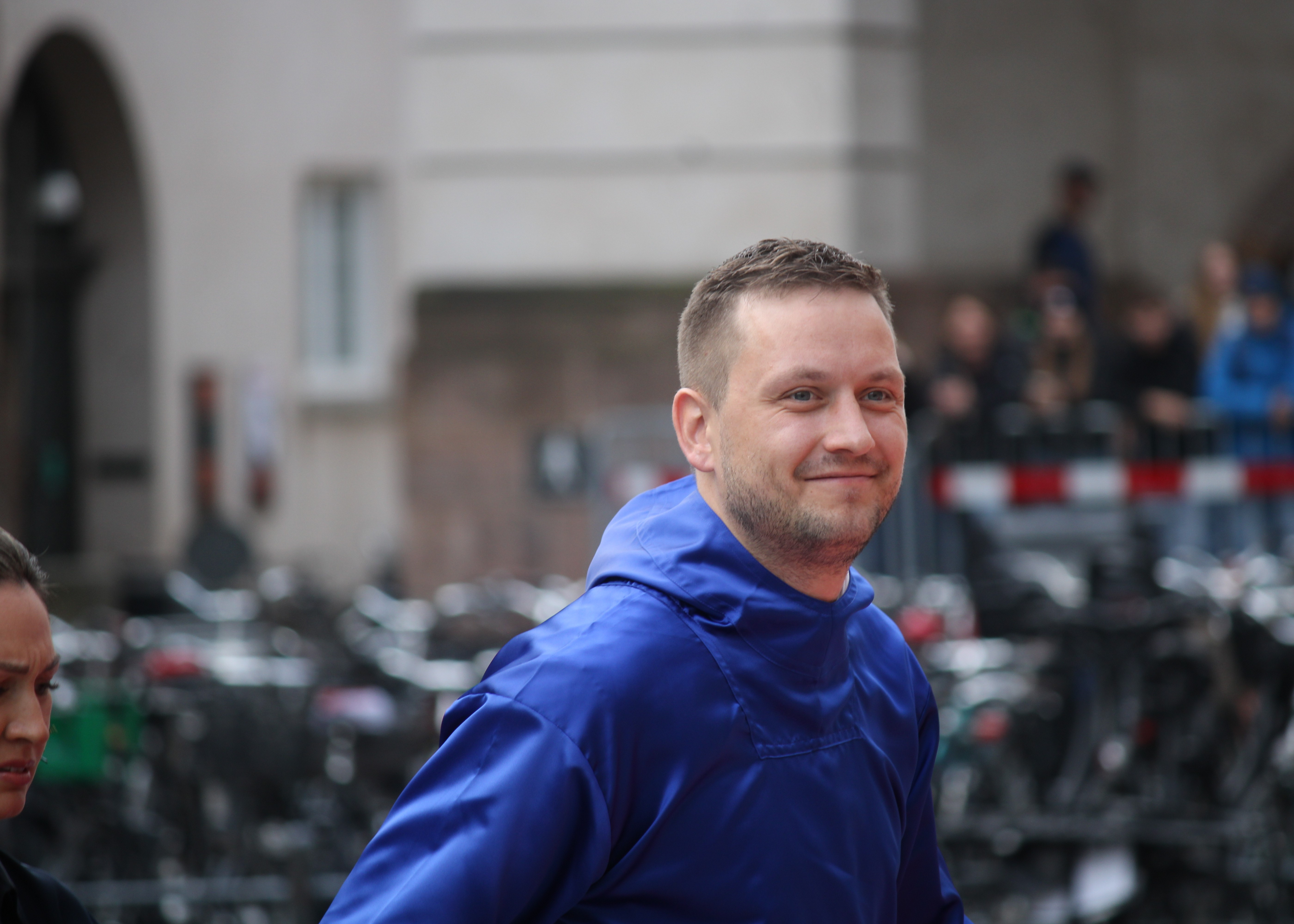
Jens-Frederik Nielsen at the 2025 opening of the Danish parliament in Copenhagen on 7 October

On 27 August 2025, the Danish government again summoned the US chargé d'affaires Mark Stroh after at least three American citizens, allegedly with ties to Trump, were reported attempting covert operations to foment secessionism. Danish media including DR reported that these three individuals were conducting influence operations in Greenland such as collecting lists of American-friendly individuals, Trump critics, and arguments to use against Danish rule.

As a result of the US government's insistence on acquiring Greenland and causing diplomatic tensions between the two NATO members, the country's military intelligence agency has classified the United States as a potential threat to its national security and, more broadly, to Europe in its annual report, published on Wednesday, 10 December. This is an unexpected conclusion in a country that has long considered itself one of Washington's closest partners. The report refers to the use of economic weapons, in particular tariffs, while also noting that Washington no longer rules out the possibility of resorting to force, even against one of its partners.

On 22 December 2025, Trump announced that he had appointed Louisiana governor Jeff Landry as special envoy to annex the territory, stating that "we have to have it" for national security. Greenland prime minister Jens-Frederik Nielsen reaffirmed in response that decisions about Greenland's future would be made on the island, and the position was supported by the European Union, France, and Canada. Denmark summoned the United States ambassador together with Greenland's representative to state their stance and asked for an explanation.

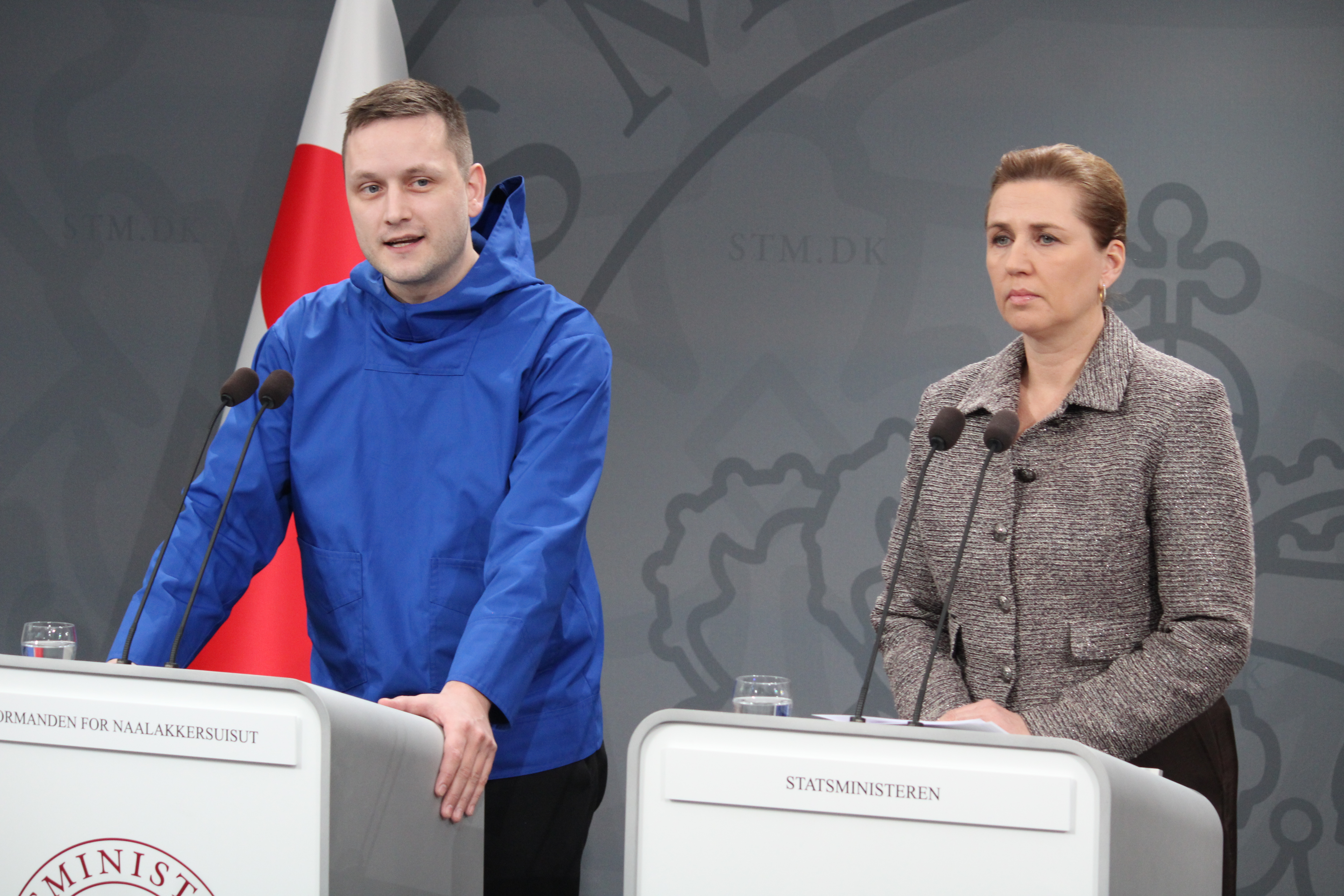
Greenlandic leader Jens Frederik-Nielsen announcing "We choose Denmark" at a January 2026 press conference with Mette Frederiksen in response to Trump's threats to invade or annex the country

After the U.S. bombed Venezuela and captured Nicolás Maduro on 3 January 2026, Trump reiterated his wish to acquire Greenland, stating that the U.S. needed Greenland for "national security". Prime Minister Frederiksen responded by urging Trump to "stop threatening Greenland" and that a forcible American takeover of the island would mean the end of NATO. On 6 January, Frederiksen and the leaders of France, Germany, Italy, Poland, Spain and the United Kingdom issued a statement jointly, which opposes Trump's comments about acquiring Greenland. The foreign ministers of Denmark, Finland, Iceland, Norway and Sweden also issued a statement, which stated that matters concerning Greenland is for Greenland to decide alone.

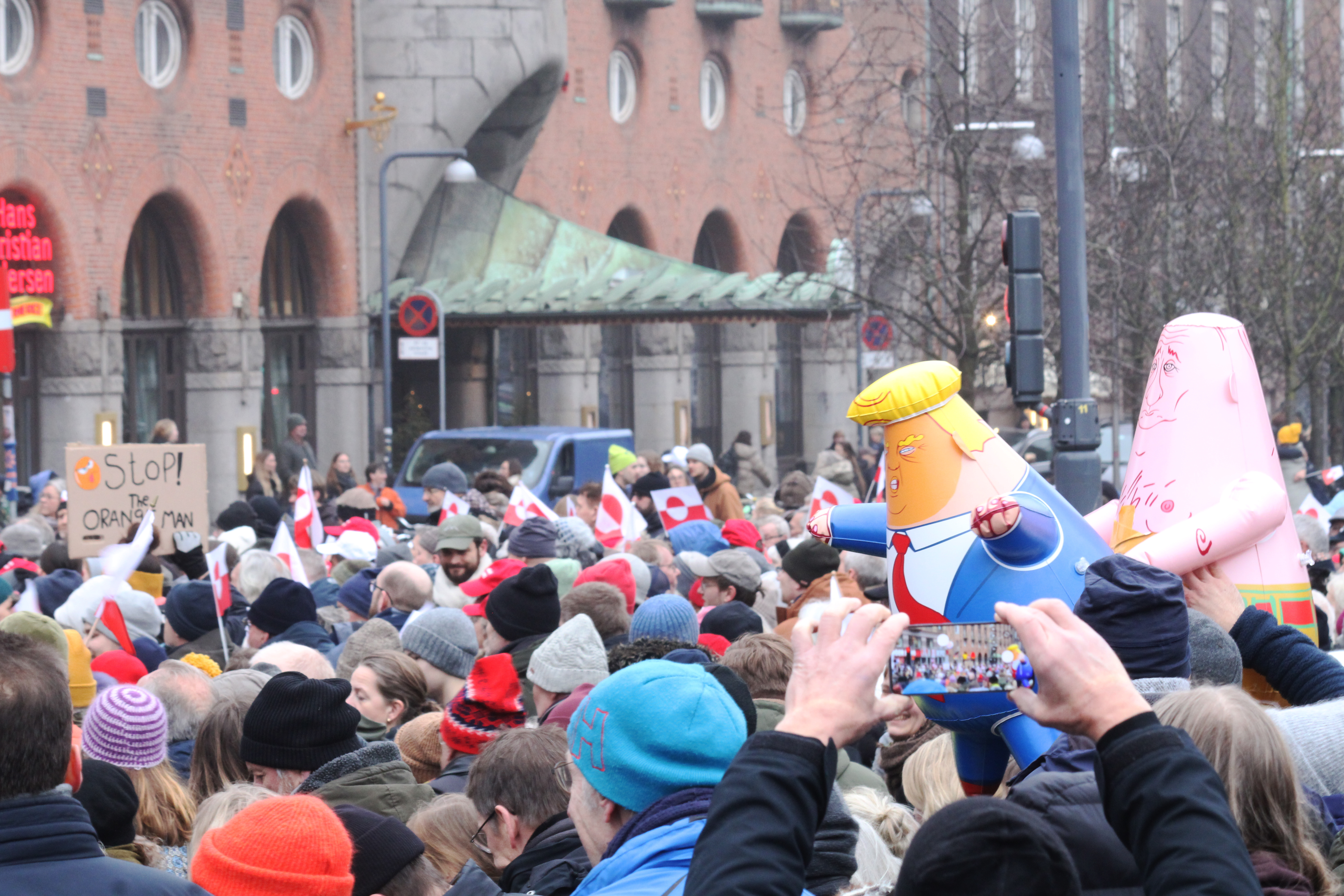
2026 saw widespread protests against the US across Greenland and Denmark, prominently featuring the slogan "Greenland is not for sale".

On 6 January 2026, The New York Times published an interview with Trump where he stated "it may be a choice" whether or not acquiring Greenland or keeping NATO was more important. He also described his reasoning for the acquisition as "Because that's what I feel is psychologically needed for success. I think that ownership gives you a thing that you can't do, whether you're talking about a lease or a treaty. Ownership gives you things and elements that you can't get from just signing a document." When pressed whether or not it was psychologically important for him or the country, Trump stated: "Psychologically important for me. Now, maybe another president would feel differently, but so far I've been right about everything." He added that "We are going to do something on Greenland, whether they like it or not, because if we don't do it, Russia or China will take over Greenland, and we're not going to have Russia or China as a neighbor". He also said that he is not opposed to using nuclear force if he "needed it" but that "it might upset NATO". In a speech at the World Economic Forum in Davos, however, Trump ruled out the use of force and repeated his claim that only the US was capable of defending Greenland. Later that day, Trump also walked back his tariff threats after saying he reached a "framework of a future deal" with NATO Secretary-General Mark Rutte.

When asked if there were any limits on using his global powers, Trump stated: "Yeah, there is one thing. My own morality. My own mind. It's the only thing that can stop me." He further stated that "I don't need international law" and that "I'm not looking to hurt people". He later clarified that he intended to abide by international law, but that "It depends what your definition of international law is".

On 22 September 2026, during the general debate of the eighty-first session of the United Nations General Assembly, the United States, Denmark, and Greenland signed a security agreement that increases US involvement in Greenland's defence while affirming Danish sovereignty and Greenland's right to self-determination. Later that month, Frihedsbrevet linked U.S. Arctic Research Commission Tom Dans, using hidden recordings of conversations between him, Jørgen Boassen, Kuno Fencker and its mole, 21-year old theology student Christian Ursilva, to efforts to secure backdoor U.S. investments in Greenland. Danish experts stated that Dans seemed to be mixing official and private interests.

===== HR 361 =====
HR 361: Make Greenland Great Again Act

United States House of Representatives
- Long title: To authorize the President to seek to enter into negotiations with the Kingdom of Denmark to secure the acquisition of Greenland by the United States
- Citation: H.R. 361
- Territorial extent: United States
- Introduced by: Andy Ogles
- Committee responsible: United States House Committee on Foreign Affairs

Keywords
- U.S. territorial sovereignty
- Status: Pending

On 13 January 2025, proposed legislation was introduced in the U.S. House of Representatives by Representative Andy Ogles to authorize the U.S. government to acquire Greenland on behalf of the United States, granting to Congress a 60-day review period prior to integration of Greenlandic territory into the United States. As of the date of introduction, the bill had 12 co-sponsors and had been referred to the United States House Committee on Foreign Affairs for review.

===== HR 1161 =====
HR 1161: Red, White, and Blueland Act of 2025

United States House of Representatives
- Long title: To authorize the President to "purchase or otherwise acquire" Greenland and to rename the island "Red, White and Blueland"
- Citation: H.R. 1161
- Territorial extent: United States
- Introduced by: Buddy Carter
- Committee responsible: United States House Committee on Foreign Affairs and United States House Committee on Natural Resources

Keywords
- U.S. territorial sovereignty
- Status: Pending

On 10 February 2025, Representative Buddy Carter introduced a proposal for legislation which would rename Greenland to "Red, White, and Blueland" and allow President Trump to "purchase or otherwise acquire" Greenland. Carter further stated, "When our Negotiator-in-Chief signs this historic agreement, we will proudly welcome the people of what is now Greenland to join the freest nation in history. President Trump has rightly identified this purchase as a national security priority." The legislation gives the office of the US secretary of the interior six months after its passage to ensure that federal documents are updated to reflect the name change. The Danish MEP Anders Vistisen commented on the proposed bill with the statement: "There is clearly a need for more adults in the room when the U.S. administration formulates foreign policy."

===== Nobel Peace Prize text exchange =====
On 19 January 2026, the government of Norway released messages from a text exchange between President Trump and Prime Minister Jonas Gahr Støre. In this exchange, Trump linked his desire to take over Greenland with his failure to win the 2025 Nobel Peace Prize. He stated that since the country of Norway (which has no control over the Norwegian Nobel Committee) had not awarded him the Peace Prize, he was no longer invested in peace, and demanded that Denmark transfer control of Greenland to the United States.

== Purchase price estimates ==
Despite repeated statements from the Greenlandic government that Greenland is not for sale, some estimates with regard to a possible price have been made. In August 2019, The Washington Post estimated a purchase price of Greenland between $200 million and $1.7 trillion, with a middle estimate of $42.6 billion. The lower figure was based on an inflation and size-adjusted valuation of what the United States paid for Alaska, and the higher figure based on a price-to-earnings ratio of 847, which the newspaper said might be justified based on future valuations of its mineral deposits, and the possibility that it might become a residential destination due to becoming a United States territory and the effects of climate change. The Financial Times's FT Alphaville estimated a $1.1 trillion price for the territory. Its sum-of-the-parts analysis valued potential oil fields at $300 billion to $400 billion, rare-earth minerals at $500 billion to $700 billion, and real estate at $200 billion to $220 billion. The newspaper wrote that the US has "a history of accretive land acquisitions", with a 7.1% internal rate of return for the Louisiana Purchase, 7.4% for Manhattan, and 9.0% for Alaska.

24/7 Wall Street estimated a purchase price for Greenland of $533 billion, using Wyoming as a comparable, and concluded: "If the United States wants it for the strategic value of its property, both on land and offshore, and to project military power, the answer is that a value of $500 billion is not overly rich." FT Alphaville reiterated its $1.1 trillion estimate in 2025. The Economist said of its $50 billion valuation using discounted cash flows—one twentieth of annual US defense spending—or about $1 million to each resident, not including its value to American national security: "Given the territory's riches and importance, America could probably make every Greenlander a multimillionaire and still benefit enormously from the purchase".

Noel Maurer of George Washington University estimated that royalties and mining tax revenues would be worth $16 to $20 billion to the U.S. federal government, net of the cost of continuing the existing Danish subsidy to Greenland. He discounted future mining revenues for the risk that they might not materialize. Maurer also estimated an additional strategic value between $12 and $24 billion, based on past U.S. offers for similar territories, for a total value between $29 billion and $45 billion, or $518,000 and $804,000 per Greenlandic citizen. David R. Barker estimated a $12.5 billion to $77 billion purchase price, observing that if Greenland benefited national security, "its value increases with the size of the U.S. economy". Nikola Swann of credit consultant SwissThink stated that the island's mineral wealth was more important because of the existing American military presence. Barker thought the Financial Times estimate was too high because the government and private industry would share the benefits of drilling and mining rights. Swann said that the importance of pharmaceuticals to the Danish economy strengthened Trump's tariffs threat. Several estimates agreed that buying Greenland would be "the deal of the century".

Summary
| Source | Estimate (middle estimate if applicable) (US$billions) |
|---|---|
| The Washington Post | 42 |
| Financial Times | 1100 |
| 24/7 Wall Street | 533 |
| The Economist | 50 |
| Noel Maurer | 37 |
| David R Barker | 31 (geometric mean) |

== Governance proposals ==
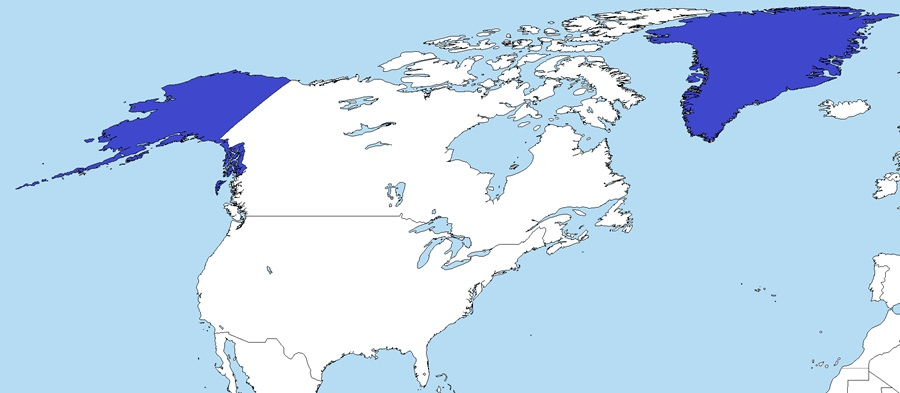
A map of North America shows Alaska and Greenland shaded in blue. Robert C. O'Brien suggested merging Greenland and Alaska to form a single polity under the United States.

Several proposals have been advanced for governance of Greenland in the event of its acquisition by the United States. Former U.S. national security advisor Robert O'Brien suggested that the United States could award Greenland to Alaska, noting that "the native people in Greenland are very closely related to the people of Alaska". A report issued by Audubon found that harmonizing Alaska's common law legal system with the Danish civil law used in Greenland would present issues, and that "indigenous populations could face challenges related to rights, cultural preservation, and social integration". The report also found that merging the two countries would offer "several advantages for the United States, spanning economic, strategic, and environmental domains".

Barry Scott Zellen, a scholar of Arctic strategy at the United States Coast Guard Academy, suggested Greenland could become an organized and unincorporated territory of the United States but with a clear pathway to eventual admission as a constituent state "not unlike that which Alaska followed". According to Zellen, "Greenlandic Inuit, who suffer from a long legacy of neglect and whose colonial experience, despite recent gains in autonomy, has not been entirely positive, may indeed stand to benefit in many ways" from this arrangement.

In November 2024, Gray proposed that an independent Greenland sign a Compact of Free Association (COFA) with the United States which would guarantee American economic and military assistance, describing it as "the deal of the century". Trump officials reportedly discussed creating a COFA and Greenlanders are aware of the proposal, in addition to their own longstanding internal discussions of seeking a COFA with Denmark or the United States. Writing in the Volokh Conspiracy, Josh Blackman suggested—in a post-acquisition scenario—the United States Congress could place Greenland within the fifth judicial circuit whose judges, he opined, might be more friendly to permitting resource extraction. Trevor Filseth of The National Interest wrote that in addition to promising that "life in Greenland will remain the same or improve under the American flag" as an autonomous territory, Trump should commit to a subsidy larger than Denmark's and exemption from the Jones Act.

A suggested compromise is for the United States to have sovereign bases on Greenland.

== Public opinion ==
=== Greenland ===
A January 2025 poll shows that 85% of Greenlanders oppose becoming a part of the United States. A 2019 article in Arctic Today said that about two-thirds of Greenlanders supported "the vision of independence from Denmark at some point in the future", but most believed that it would not be viable if it led to a cessation of Danish subsidies. The article observed that "president Trump's notion that Greenland, including all of its 57,000 inhabitants with their distinct language, unique culture, democratic institutions and the rest of it could be sold and bought as a simple piece of real estate collided head on with all current views in Denmark and Greenland of normality, the status of the kingdom, the value of history and respectful interchange between peoples as the foundation of the current order of our times."

The first survey of the island on foreign policy, by the Konrad Adenauer Foundation in 2021, found that 68% of islanders wanted more cooperation with Denmark. Martin Breum of the Arctic Council said that the finding was not contradictory with the strong support for independence, as many supporters believe that post-independence cooperation with Denmark would be voluntary for Greenland. 69% of Greenlanders wanted more cooperation with the United States, and 75% viewed NATO positively. The survey found that 85% of 704 islanders polled wanted more cooperation with Canada, which Breum interpreted as wanting closer ties with the Inuit of Nunavut and not with Canada as a whole. He said, "If I am right, this might disturb a few influential people in Nuuk" who have deemphasized transnational Inuit ties and support for the Inuit Circumpolar Council.

A January 2025 poll of 416 residents of Greenland, conducted by the U.S. survey firm Patriot Polling, found that 57.3% of respondents approve of Greenland joining the United States, while 37.4% disapprove and 5.3% are undecided. The poll and the firm behind it was severely criticized by professor Scott Lucas from University College Dublin, however, who called the poll very suspect, criticizing the lack of information on how the respondents were chosen, which questions were asked, and what was its statistical uncertainty. He also named the firm behind it as a start-up organization having a political purpose performing push polls. The CEO of the organization, Lucca Ruggieri, came under criticism due to his ties to Republican donors and politicians.

A poll of 497 adult residents of Greenland between 22 and 26 January 2025, made by Verian for the national Greenlandic newspaper Sermitsiaq and the national Danish newspaper Berlingske, found that 85% of respondents rejected a proposition that Greenland should leave the Danish Realm to become part of the United States, whereas 6% supported the proposition and 9% were undecided. In the same poll, when asked whether they would prefer a Danish or an American citizenship, 55% preferred a Danish one and 8% an American one, whereas 37% were undecided. Furthermore, the poll explored opinions on Donald Trump's interest in Greenland: The results indicate that 45% of responders consider Donald Trump's interest in Greenland to be a threat, while 43% view it as an opportunity and 13% of answered "Don't know". The statistical uncertainty was reported as between 1.9% and 4.4%. Trump's interest in Greenland has strengthened the cause of Greenland's independence from Denmark. Only the party leader of Qulleq stated his support for Trump but the party failed to win any seats in the 2025 regional election which was won by the moderate and highly Trump-critical Democrats. The separatist Naleraq which has pro-Trump members came in second place.

=== United States ===
A January 2025 poll of 1,000 U.S. registered voters conducted by Suffolk University found approximately 53 percent of respondents oppose acquiring Greenland, while 40 percent supported the idea. A poll of 6,933 U.S. adults by YouGov, fielded on 8 January 2025, found 31% "strongly support" or "somewhat support" the U.S. seeking ownership of Greenland, 35% "strongly oppose" or "somewhat oppose" such a move, and 34% weren't sure. Responses indicating strong support for the proposal were highest among men, 18 to 29 year-olds, and persons in the Southern United States. Responses indicating strong opposition to the proposal were highest among persons over the age of 65 and those in the Midwestern United States. A week later, another poll by YouGov joint with The Economist, comprising 1,558 U.S. adults, reported that 28% supported the U.S. seeking ownership of Greenland, whereas 47% opposed this and 25% were not sure. About one-fourth of those in favor of U.S. ownership of Greenland, corresponding to 6% of all poll participants, supported using military force to take over Greenland.

Another poll of 1,077 U.S. adults, conducted by Ipsos for Reuters during 20–21 January 2025, showed little support for plans of extending U.S. territory, finding that only 16% of respondents agreed that the U.S. should pressure Denmark into selling Greenland to the U.S. and 21% agreed that the U.S. has a right to expand its territory in the Western Hemisphere. A January 2026 Quinnipiac poll, found that 86% opposed using military force to take over Greenland, and 55% opposed buying it.

=== Denmark ===
A January 2025 YouGov poll found that nearly half of Danes consider the United States a significant threat, surpassing concerns about North Korea and Iran, while 78% oppose selling Greenland to the United States. In response to Trump's statements during his second term, Danish residents issued a satirical petition for Denmark to purchase California from the United States that went viral and attracted several hundred thousand Danish signatures in support. The petition parodied Trump's rhetoric as president, bearing the slogan "Måke Califørnia Great Ægain" and vowing to "bring hygge to Hollywood, bike lanes to Beverly Hills and organic smørrebrød to every street corner."

== European Union reaction ==
As of January 2026, French president Macron has urged the EU to consider the use of the Anti-Coercion Instrument in regard of tariffs imposed on some EU members by US President Trump as part of Trump's proposals for the annexation of Greenland.

== See also ==
- Greenland crisis
- 51st state § Greenland
- American expansionism under Donald Trump
- American imperialism
- Former organized territories of the United States
- Hans Island – Greenland island previously subject of a territorial dispute between Canada and Denmark
- List of territory purchased by a sovereign nation from another sovereign nation
- Movements for the annexation of Canada to the United States
- Territorial evolution of the United States
- Treaty of the Danish West Indies, whereby in 1917 the United States purchased the United States Virgin Islands from Denmark
