= Dear Jonas =

2026 text message in response to the Greenland crisis

Dear Jonas are the first words of a January 2026 text message in response to the Greenland crisis written to Jonas Gahr Støre, the prime minister of Norway, by Donald Trump, the 47th president of the United States. Trump shared the message widely with world leaders. In the text, Trump outlines his political worldview and justification for threatening to annex Greenland, declaring that he no longer "feel[s] an obligation to think purely of Peace" after his failure to win the 2025 Nobel Peace Prize. He also asserts he has stopped "8 Wars PLUS" and demands "Complete and Total Control of Greenland." Trump also promoted several falsehoods about Greenland's history. The message became the subject of widespread commentary, condemnation and ridicule. (Note: Attributed to multiple sources:) It prompted renewed scrutiny of Trump's age and fitness for office.

Although many news outlets described the message as a letter, it was sent as a text message.

== Background ==
The message was written amid the escalation of the Greenland crisis, a diplomatic confrontation initiated by Donald Trump during his second term as president, in which he repeatedly asserted that the United States should annex Greenland, an autonomous territory of the Kingdom of Denmark. At the same time, Trump displayed a growing fixation on the 2025 Nobel Peace Prize, which was awarded by the Norwegian Nobel Committee to Venezuelan opposition leader María Corina Machado. Trump repeatedly asserted, incorrectly, that Norway bore responsibility for his not receiving the prize. According to reporting by The New York Times, Norwegian prime minister Jonas Gahr Støre and Finnish president Alexander Stubb engaged in an exchange with Trump in mid-January 2026 aimed at "de-escalating" tensions urging restraint in rhetoric toward Greenland and Denmark. Instead, Trump responded by circulating the message later known as Dear Jonas, explicitly linking his reduced commitment to peace to the Nobel decision and asserting that he no longer felt "an obligation to think purely of Peace" after his failure to win the Nobel Peace Prize, and insisting on "Complete and Total Control of Greenland." Trump asked his staff to share the message with numerous European ambassadors in Washington and request that they forward it to world leaders.

== Text ==
In the text to Støre, Trump wrote:

Message from Donald Trump to Norway

Dear Jonas:

Considering your Country decided not to give me the Nobel Peace Prize for having stopped 8 Wars PLUS, I no longer feel an obligation to think purely of Peace, although it will always be predominant, but can now think about what is good and proper for the United States of America.

Denmark cannot protect that land from Russia or China, and why do they have a "right of ownership" anyway? There are no written documents, it's only that a boat landed there hundreds of years ago, but we had boats landing there, also.

I have done more for NATO than any other person since its founding, and now, NATO should do something for the United States.

The World is not secure unless we have Complete and Total Control of Greenland.

Thank you!

President DJT

== Reactions ==
Opposition lawmakers were quick to condemn Trump's communique to Norway, even questioning Trump's mental fitness for office: Senator Andy Kim of New Jersey described it as "unhinged and embarrassing", and Chris Murphy, a member of the Senate Foreign Affairs Committee, as "the ramblings of a man who has lost touch with reality". Senator Brian Schatz said "I don't see how you can be a serious person and not find this extremely worrisome. He is not stable at all". CNN's medical analyst Jonathan Reiner called for a bipartisan congressional inquiry into Trump's mental fitness. Vin Gupta, the medical analyst for NBC News, said the message "crossed a line of proper adult behavior" and should have had a "more thorough public assessment of his neurological fitness," stating that Trump's behavior including his message to Støre could be signs of early Alzheimer's or frontotemporal dementia.

CNN reported that Trump falsely claimed that "no written documents" existed formalizing Danish sovereignty, although the US has on many occasions recognized Danish sovereignty over Greenland. Norwegian experts said Trump's "stupidity is so great that it's hard to know where to begin."

American historian Anne Applebaum wrote that Trump is "maniacally, unhealthily obsessive" about the Nobel Peace Prize and uses it as justification for an invasion of Greenland. Trump later claimed that he doesn't care about the Nobel Prize and that it is "controlled by Norway."

Støre, the recipient of Trump's message, said that "I have several times clearly explained to Trump what is well known, namely that it is an independent Nobel Committee, and not the Norwegian government, that awards the prize."
