= Greenland crisis =

Diplomatic crisis over US annexation threats

- Part of American expansionism under Donald Trump
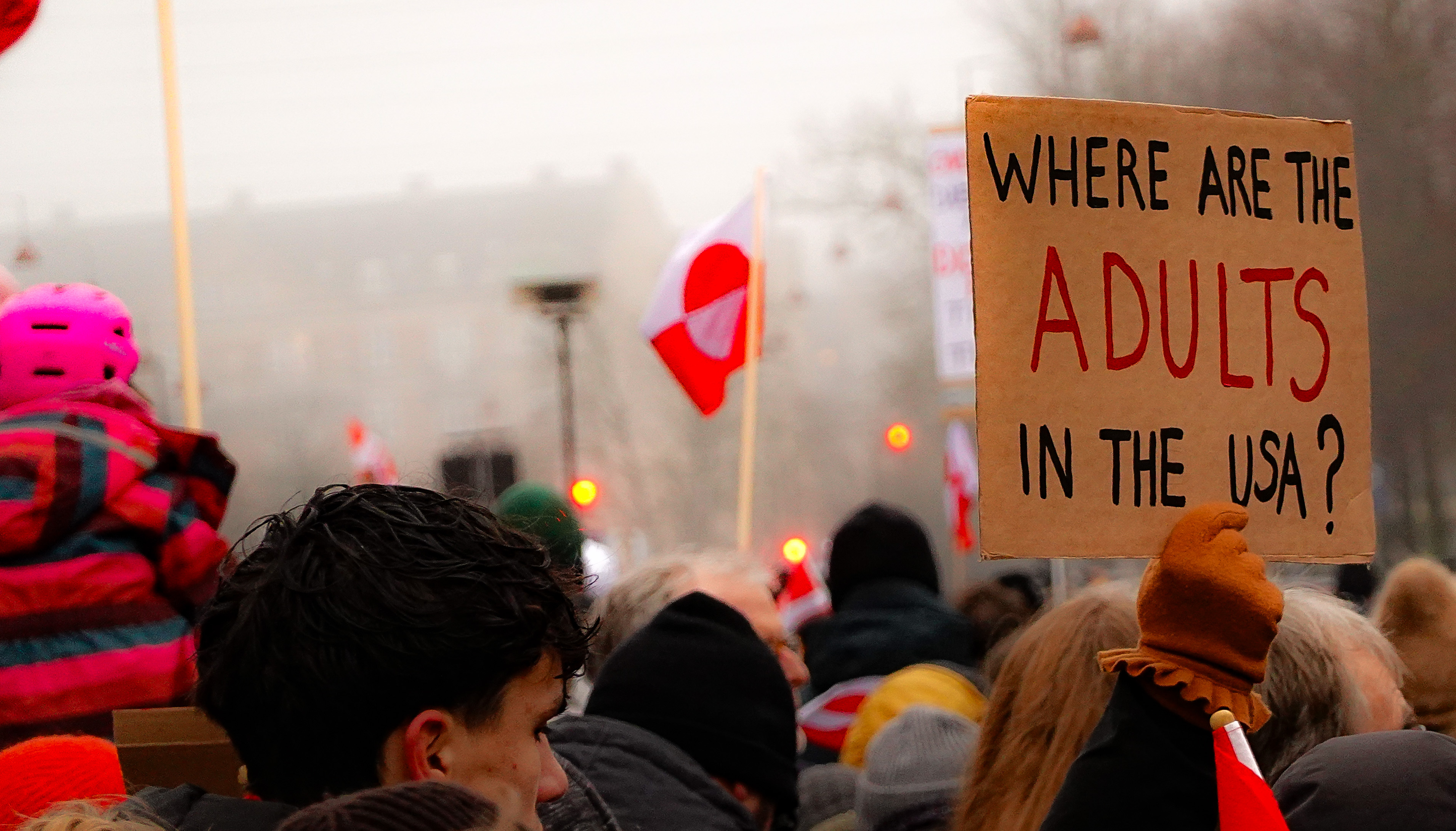
- "Hands off Greenland" protests in Copenhagen, 2026
- Date: 20 January 2025 – 22 September 2026 (1 year, 8 months and 2 days)
- Caused by: Threats of annexation of Greenland by the United States
- Status: Settled by the defence agreement of 22 September 2026: Operation Arctic Endurance and Operation Arctic Sentry; Hands off Greenland protests; Trump rules out use of military force to take Greenland

Parties
United States	Danish Realm; Denmark; Greenland; Faroe Islands; Operation Arctic Endurance members; Belgium; Estonia; Finland; France; Germany; Iceland; Netherlands; Norway; Slovenia; Sweden; United Kingdom; Canada; European Union

Lead figures
(United States) Donald Trump; (United States) JD Vance; (United States) Marco Rubio; (United States) Pete Hegseth; (United States) Stephen Miller; (United States) Jeff Landry	(Danish Realm) Mette Frederiksen; (Danish Realm) Troels Lund Poulsen; (Danish Realm) Lars Løkke Rasmussen; (Greenland) Jens-Frederik Nielsen; (Greenland) Múte Bourup Egede; (Greenland) Vivian Motzfeldt

A diplomatic crisis began in 2025 when the United States, under the second presidency of Donald Trump, sought to annex Greenland, an autonomous territory of the Danish Realm—a treaty ally of the United States and co-member of NATO, and a member of the European Union (EU). (Note: The Kingdom of Denmark has been a member of the EU since 1973. Since 1985, Greenland has not been in the EU but rather an Overseas Country and Territory associated with the union, with Greenlanders, as Danish citizens, having EU citizenship. The Faroe Islands is also an autonomous territory of the Kingdom of Denmark and is not part of the EU.) The crisis intensified in early 2026 when Trump refused to rule out the use of military force for this annexation and threatened a 25% import tax on goods from several European nations unless Denmark ceded the territory to the United States. Denmark's refusal was supported by the EU and several other NATO members, reigniting earlier concerns of a US–EU trade war. Within weeks, Trump backed down, pledging not to use force or tariffs to annex Greenland.

Trump had tried to purchase Greenland during his first presidency. After his 2024 re-election, in January 2026, he said "it may be a choice" whether to preserve NATO or seize Greenland, and in Dear Jonas, a letter leaked by Norwegian prime minister Jonas Gahr Støre, Trump had said that he "no longer [felt] an obligation to think purely of Peace" after not receiving the Nobel Peace Prize. A report by the Danish Defence Intelligence Service mentioned the United States as a potential threat to national security for the first time in its history, and Danish officials raised concerns about reports that Director of National Intelligence Tulsi Gabbard had assigned agents to spy on Greenland.

The Greenlandic and Danish prime ministers rejected any American takeover, saying they would defend Greenland in the event of an attack. Both NATO and EU members would be obliged to assist Denmark in the event of an attack. Denmark and eight NATO allies deployed forces to defend the territory. In response, Trump threatened a trade war against the EU, leading European politicians to suspend a proposed EU–US trade agreement and consider placing sanctions on the US.

Trump's threats led to large protests in Greenland and Denmark. (Note: Attributed to multiple references:) A YouGov poll found that only 8% of Americans supported an invasion of Greenland, with 73% opposed. Trump's actions faced heavy opposition in Congress from both major parties, with Republican speaker of the House Mike Johnson describing Trump's threats as "completely inappropriate" and a bipartisan congressional delegation travelling to Copenhagen to support Denmark–United States relations. The crisis was described as one of the most erratic episodes involving an American president, prompting scrutiny of Trump's age and fitness for office.

On 21 January, Trump reversed course, first ruling out military force and then abandoning tariff threats after talks with NATO secretary-general Mark Rutte reached what Trump called a "framework of a future deal". Greenland and Denmark ruled out any deal altering the sovereignty of Greenland and Denmark, with Trump's comments referring to pre-existing commitments from a 1951 US–Denmark treaty. At the 2026 Ankara NATO summit in July, Trump restated his opinion that it would be better if Greenland was controlled by the US and not by Denmark. On 18 September 2026, the United States, Denmark, and Greenland reached an agreement in which the United States would receive the rights to an expanded military footprint in Greenland with greater security control, without, according to the Danish and Greenlandic governments, conditionally transferring much military sovereignty of Greenland to the United States. The agreement was signed on 22 September 2026.

== Background ==
During the first Trump administration, US president Donald Trump said that the United States should buy Greenland. The governments of Denmark and Greenland clarified that Greenland is not for sale and cannot be sold under the Danish constitution, and the Danish government has always rejected such proposals, which Prime Minister Mette Frederiksen called "an absurd discussion". Greenland invited American investment, however, stating that "we're open for business, not for sale".

In December 2024, President-elect Trump, before the onset of his second administration, reiterated his interest in the United States assuming control of Greenland, stating that "for purposes of national security and freedom throughout the world, the United States of America feels that the ownership and control of Greenland is an absolute necessity."

=== History of Greenland ===
Greenland is part of the Nordic region.

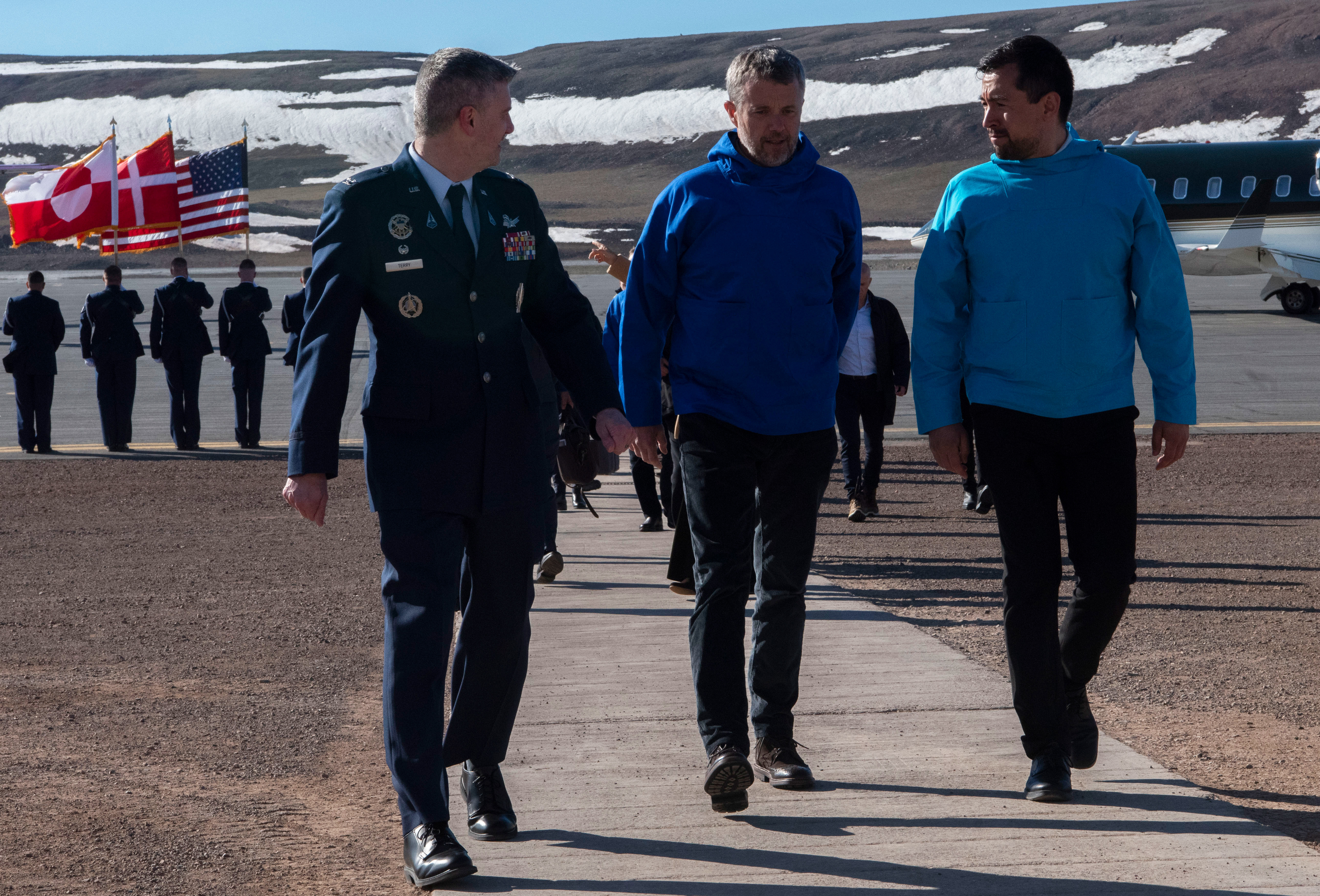
Greenland's head of state, King Frederik X, and the Greenland prime minister Múte Bourup Egede visit Pituffik Space Base and are greeted on the runway by US base commander Jason Terry, with Greenlandic, Danish, and US flags in the background, 29 June 2024. The King and the Prime Minister made a stop at the base when travelling to Qaanaaq in the north of Greenland and are wearing traditional Greenlandic blue anoraks.

Greenland is an autonomous territory of the Kingdom of Denmark, and has been associated with the Scandinavian kingdoms of Denmark and Norway for more than a millennium, beginning in 986 AD when Norse settlers from what is now Norway and Iceland settled Greenland. The 13th century saw the arrival of the Inuit, the ancestors of today's majority population. After around 400 years, the Norse settlement in Greenland is believed to have died out in the late 15th century, but the legends of it persisted in Scandinavia. This prompted King Christian IV to send an expedition to Greenland in 1605 to locate the lost Eastern Norse Settlement and reassert sovereignty over Greenland. Norwegian priest Hans Egede reestablished a permanent Dano-Norwegian presence in 1721, founding the town of Godthaab (now Nuuk). Today's population is mainly Inuit, with a smaller Danish population, and many people are of mixed Inuit and Danish origin. Greenlanders often have close family, personal, and cultural ties to Denmark, with thousands living there.

Greenland formally became part of the Kingdom of Norway in 1261, when the Norse inhabitants submitted to the King of Norway. Norway then entered a union with Denmark in 1380. Under the 1814 Treaty of Kiel, Greenland remained with the Danish Crown as part of the settlement with Sweden following the Napoleonic Wars. Denmark declared full sovereignty over all of Greenland, including the uninhabited parts, in 1921, in the aftermath of the Treaty of Versailles. In 1933, Norway, which occupied part of Eastern Greenland, accepted a ruling of the Permanent Court of International Justice affirming Danish sovereignty over all of Greenland and renounced its claim.

The 1953 Constitution of Denmark ended Greenland's status as a colony, integrating it fully into the Danish state as a regular county, as part of decolonization efforts and with the consent of the Greenland Provincial Council. In the 1979 Greenlandic home rule referendum, Denmark granted home rule to Greenland, leading to the establishment of a local government authority with responsibility for local matters, but Greenland remains part of the Kingdom of Denmark, with the central government in Copenhagen solely responsible for defence and foreign policy. As part of the Nordic region and the Kingdom of Denmark, Greenland is an associate member of the Nordic Council. Greenland is one of the Overseas Countries and Territories of the EU. Greenlanders are Danish citizens and therefore also EU citizens.

In 2009, Greenland was recognised by the Kingdom of Denmark and under international law as a people entitled to external self-determination. Most political parties in Greenland favour independence from Denmark as a long-term goal, with a draft constitution for an independent Greenlandic state presented by lawmakers in 2023, but the majority does not favour severing ties with Denmark in the short term.

=== Military presence in Greenland ===
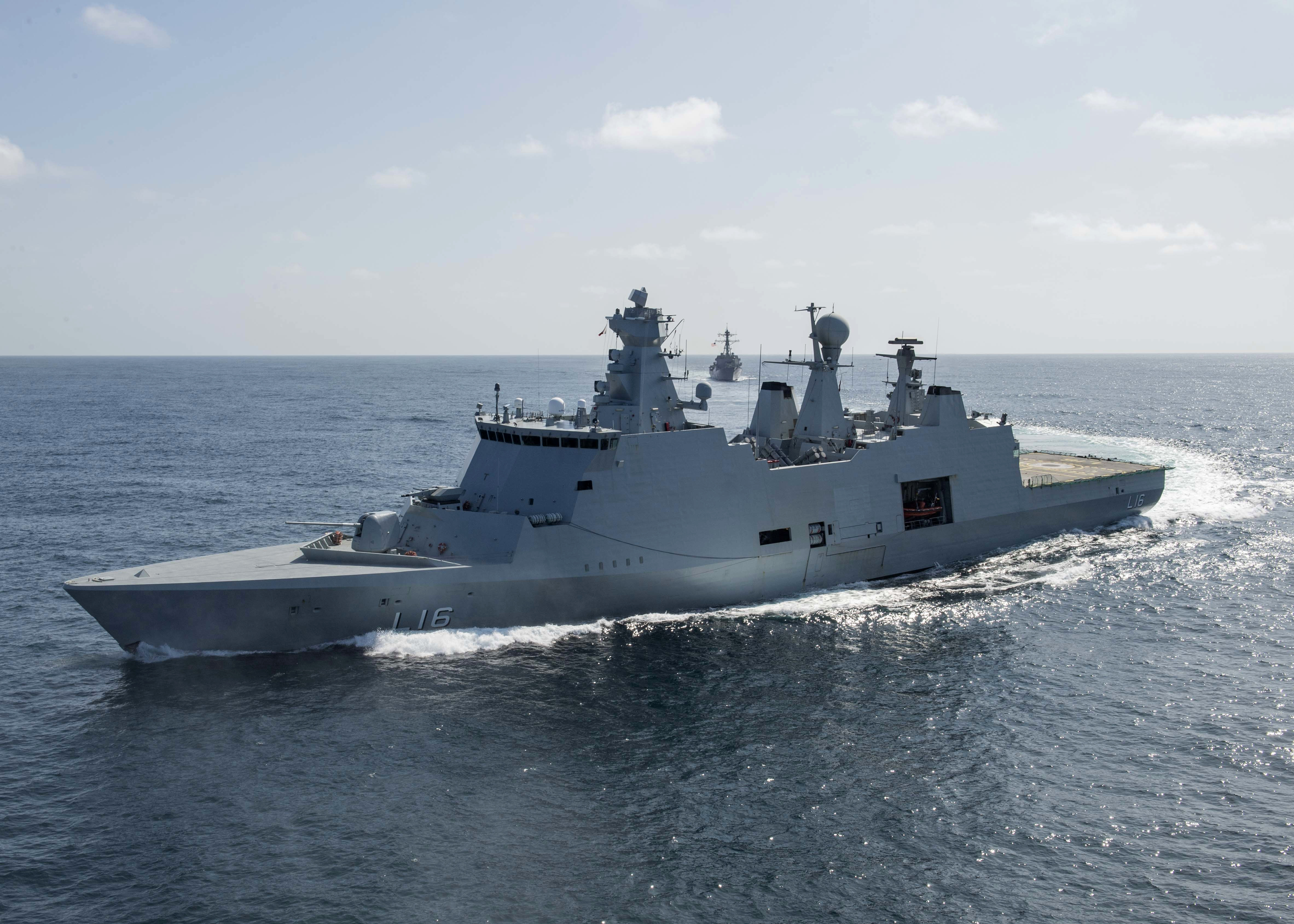
Royal Danish Navy frigate HDMS Absalon (F341) off the coast of Greenland

Denmark is one of the twelve original founding member states of NATO, and signed the Greenland Defense Agreement with the United States in 1951, allowing the American military to operate in Greenland with Danish consent under a NATO framework. At its peak, approximately 10,000 American military personnel were stationed in Greenland, including about 6,000 at what is now Pituffik Space Base. After the Cold War, Greenland became a lower strategic priority for the United States, which gradually reduced its presence to roughly 150 personnel by 2026. After the September 11 attacks in 2001, Denmark supplied military aid to the United States as part of its NATO Article 5 obligation, incurring 44 deaths in the Afghan War.

Denmark increased its Arctic defence and led a large NATO exercise in Greenland in 2025. The exercise involved more than 550 soldiers, including special forces, from Denmark, Norway, Sweden, France, and Germany. The Nordic countries also collaborate on Arctic defence through NATO exercises conducted across the region, such as the Joint Viking exercise in 2025. In 2025, Denmark announced a 14.6 billion kr. plan to boost Arctic defence.

Greenland is under the military command of the Joint Arctic Commander, Danish general Søren Andersen. The Arctic Command has around 150 permanent personnel, but regularly deploys units from across the Danish Defence forces, including the Arctic Response Force with aircraft and ships that stand ready to support forces in Greenland. The Sirius Dog Sled Patrol special forces unit operates around Daneborg in the northeast of Greenland, a national park, but only comprises a small part of Danish and allied military capabilities in Greenland. As of 2026, NATO members are in discussions about establishing a permanent NATO mission in Greenland, Arctic Sentry, modelled on the Baltic Sentry, following a proposal by Germany. Law enforcement in Greenland employs around 350 people. As of 2026, hundreds of elite Danish combat soldiers trained in arctic warfare have been deployed to Greenland, including the Chief of the Royal Danish Army, General Peter Harling Boysen, with Denmark stating its intention to send a "substantial contribution" of its armed forces there in response to the Greenland crisis. Denmark said the deployment might stay in Greenland for 1–2 years.

=== History of US recognition of Danish sovereignty over Greenland ===
In the 1826 General Convention of Friendship, Commerce and Navigation with the king of Denmark, the United States recognised Greenland as a northern possession of the king, and accepted the trade restrictions that Denmark imposed there. In the Treaty of the Danish West Indies, signed in 1916, the US government explicitly recognised Danish sovereignty over all of Greenland. In the 1941 US–Danish agreement, the American Government "reiterate[d] its recognition of and respect for the sovereignty of the Kingdom of Denmark over Greenland". During World War II, the United States defended Greenland at the request of Danish and Greenlandic officials acting without approval from the central government of Denmark, while it was under Nazi occupation. In the 1951 Greenland Defense Agreement, the United States again recognised the sovereignty of the Kingdom of Denmark over all of Greenland. In the 2004 amendment to the Greenland Defense Agreement, the United States recognised Greenland as "an equal part of the Kingdom of Denmark under the Constitution [with] a wide ranging Greenland Home Rule".

=== Donald Trump's first presidency ===
Since late 2018, Trump repeatedly privately and publicly discussed buying Greenland. The Trump administration "courted Greenlandic politicians with promises of American business investment, educational opportunities, and development aid". According to a report in the New Yorker, a 2019 delegation of American diplomats and national-security officials, dispatched to discuss mining of mineral and particularly rare-earth mineral resources, included members of the Greenland Policy Coordination Committee, a committee within the National Security Council "working to subvert the Kingdom of Denmark".

== Timeline ==
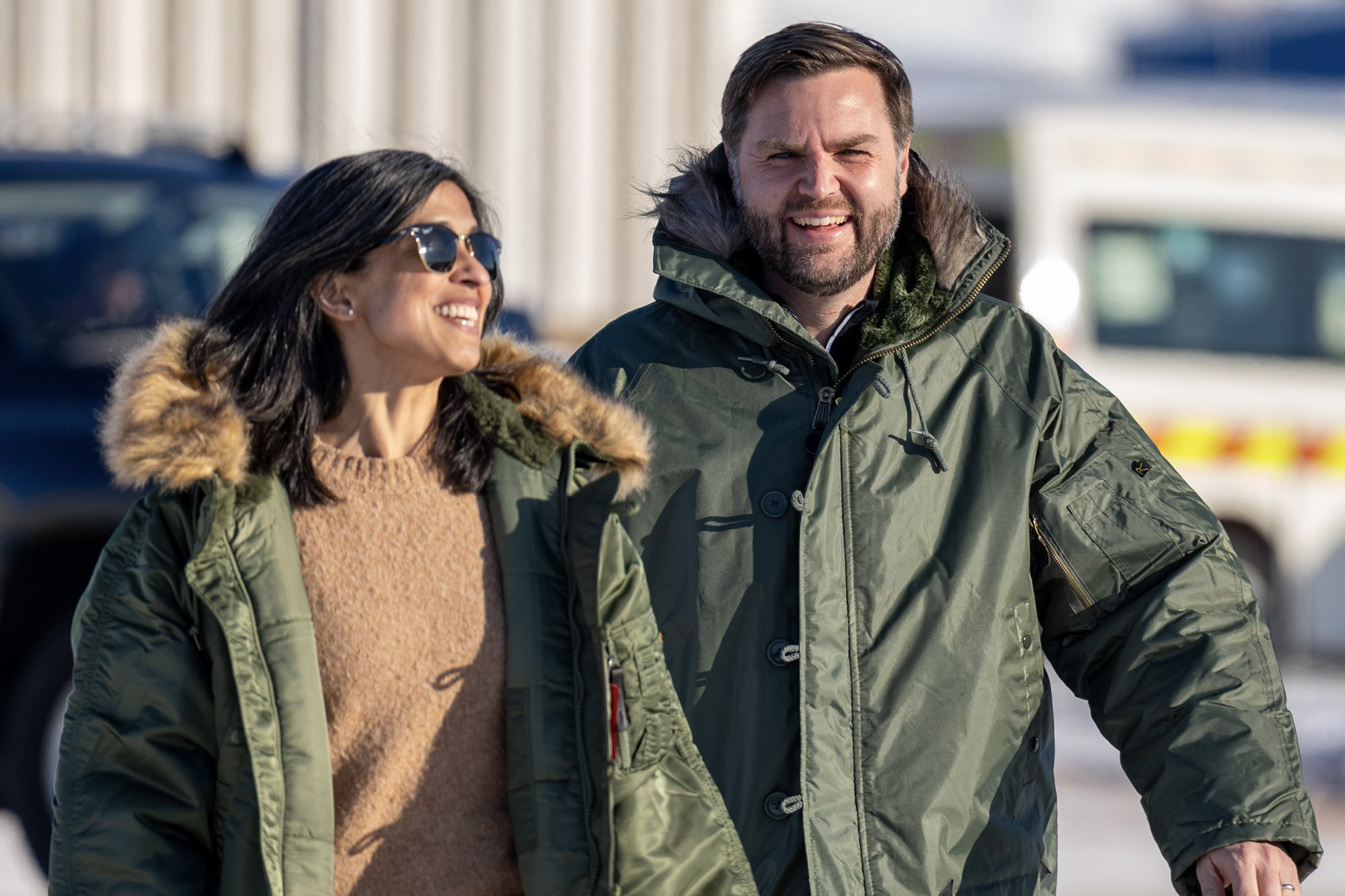
US vice-president JD Vance and his wife Usha Vance at Pituffik Space Base, March 2025

From Donald Trump's reelection in 2024 and until his public reversal in January 2026, he refused to rule out an invasion of Greenland and engaged in actions and comments seen as provocations against Denmark. Danish national broadcaster DR divided Trump's plans to take over Greenland into three main phases, starting from December 2024: a charm offensive, pressure on the Danish government, and Greenlandic societal infiltration.

=== 2025 ===
In January 2025, before taking office, Trump stated he would not exclude using economic or military force against Greenland and that the United States needed the territory for national security. On 6 January 2025, he threatened to "tariff Denmark at a very high level" if it did not agree to Trump's plan.

On 11 January, Donald Trump Jr. went on a private visit to Greenland. Local media reported that his entourage passed out MAGA hats to locals and attempted to speak to residents on a speakerphone. Pipaluk Lynge, a Greenlandic member of parliament, called the visit "staged". Berlingske reported that an American military person asked the Joint Arctic Command to provide information about Greenlandic infrastructure.

In the following months, Republican congressman Buddy Carter introduced a bill in the United States Congress to advance efforts to annex Greenland and rename it Red, White, and Blueland and US vice president JD Vance visited, without invitation, the Pituffik Space Base, where he gave a speech about how Denmark had failed Greenlanders. Vance's visit was condemned by Greenlandic and Danish politicians, and described as a provocation. In connection with the visit, commander Susannah Meyers, the highest-ranking US officer in Greenland, said the Trump administration's threats against the Kingdom of Denmark "are not reflective of Pituffik Space Base". In response, Meyers was fired by Trump. American defence secretary Pete Hegseth all but acknowledged that The Pentagon had plans to invade Greenland, by refusing to rule out the option and by saying the Pentagon plans for all contingencies, although the Pentagon later clarified that it had not been asked to draw up such plans.

Denmark accused the Trump administration of conducting covert marketing campaigns intended to persuade Greenlanders to secede from Denmark. American influencers handed out dollar bills in the streets of Nuuk. This led to at least three American men with connections to Trump to be monitored by the Danish Security and Intelligence Service (PET) for attempting to infiltrate Greenland, with the purpose of creating discord with Denmark by exploiting existing or fabricated disagreements.

In December 2025, Trump appointed Jeff Landry as special envoy to Greenland. The role was described as informal and one-sided. Landry said he would work to make Greenland part of the United States and intended to attend, uninvited, a traditional dog sled race. Denmark summoned the American ambassador, Ken Howery and Foreign Minister Lars Løkke Rasmussen called Landry's statements "completely unacceptable", adding, "we insist that everyone – including the US – must show respect for the territorial integrity of the Kingdom of Denmark".

=== 2026 ===
Asked: Are there limits on your global power?

Yeah, there is one thing. My own morality. My own mind. It's the only thing that can stop me. I don't need international law. I'm not looking to hurt people.

— Donald Trump, 7 January 2026

New York Times White House correspondents wrote that "Mr. Trump's assessment... was the most blunt acknowledgment yet of his worldview. At its core is the concept that national strength, rather than laws, treaties and conventions, should be the deciding factor as powers collide."

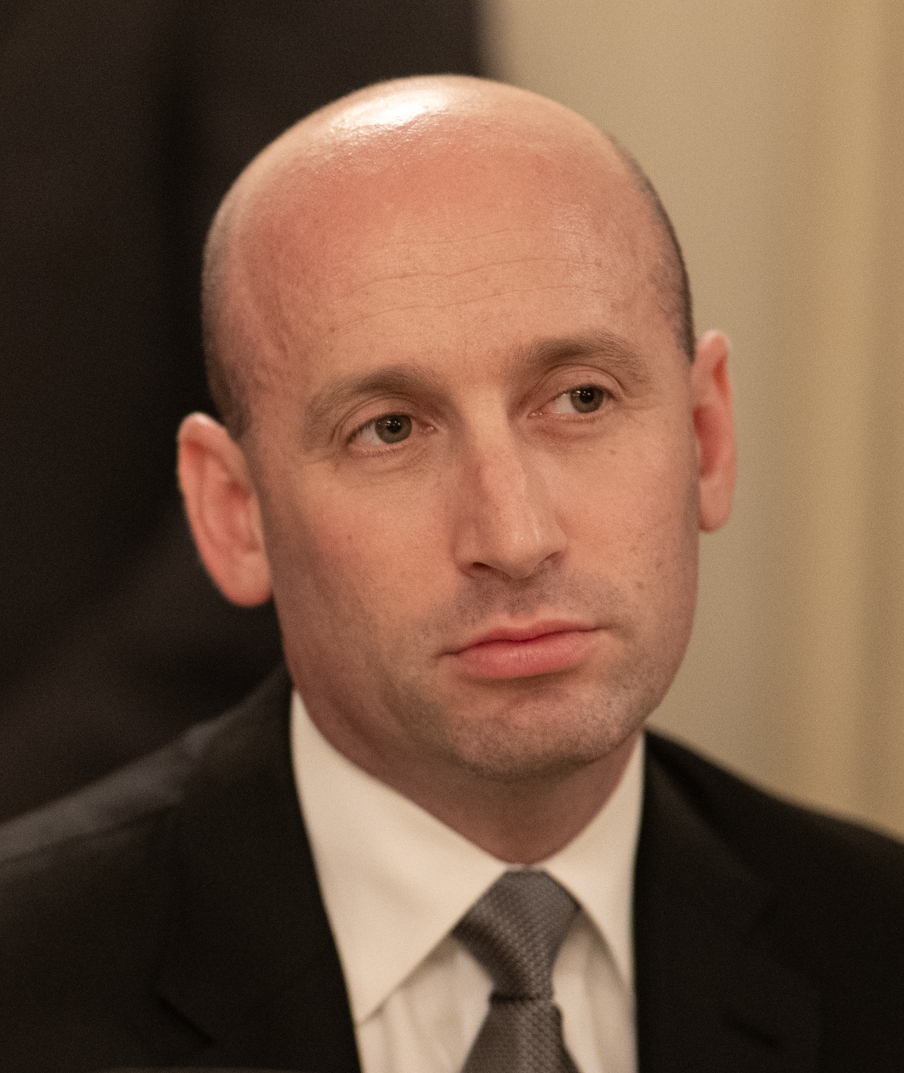
White House operative Stephen Miller was described as being a driving force behind Trump's threats to invade Greenland.

Right after the 2026 United States intervention in Venezuela on 3 January, which led to the capture of Nicolás Maduro and Cilia Flores and their subsequent extraction from the country, White House deputy chief of staff Stephen Miller stated that the US has the right to take Greenland. His wife Katie Miller published a map of Greenland covered in the American flag with the word "SOON", which drew widespread condemnation. The Trump administration threatened military action to take control of Greenland as an option, while Secretary of State Marco Rubio stated that the goal is to buy the island from Denmark. Trump did not request any military plans for invading Greenland.

A few days later, Trump claimed that "I don't need international law" and that it "may be a choice" for the United States between seizing Greenland or preserving NATO. Trump said existing treaty rights are insufficient, arguing that full ownership is "psychologically needed for success" and that the United States would "do something" on Greenland "whether they like it or not". The president also said that he would take Greenland "the hard way" if Denmark does not give up its territory, claiming that "the fact that [Denmark] had a boat land there 500 years ago doesn't mean they own the land". Trump was quoted saying "One way or the other, we are going to have Greenland" and that "we're talking about acquiring, not leasing, not having it short-term".

Republican congressman Randy Fine proposed that the United States annex Greenland, in what he called the Greenland Annexation and Statehood Act. In response, the Greenlandic prime minister Jens-Frederik Nielsen stated that Greenland had no wish to become part of the US. Trump proceeded to threaten him and denied he knew Nielsen. Trump officials again threatened that the American president could take action against Greenland within weeks.

Letter from Donald Trump to Norway

Dear Jonas: Considering your Country decided not to give me the Nobel Peace Prize for having stopped 8 Wars PLUS, I no longer feel an obligation to think purely of Peace, although it will always be predominant, but can now think about what is good and proper for the United States of America. Denmark cannot protect that land from Russia or China, and why do they have a "right of ownership" anyway? There are no written documents (Note: The Treaty of the Danish West Indies, ratified by the United States in 1917, permanently recognised Danish control over Greenland.) it's only that a boat landed there hundreds of years ago, but we had boats landing there, also. I have done more for NATO than any other person since its founding, and now, NATO should do something for the United States. The World is not secure unless we have Complete and Total Control of Greenland. Thank you! President DJT

— Donald Trump

In mid-January, Trump posted on his website Truth Social "NATO: Tell Denmark to get them out of here, NOW!" and reiterated false claims that the Danish Defence forces protecting Greenland consists of "two dogsleds". He said he would impose tariffs on countries that participated in Operation Arctic Endurance; a 10% import tariff would be imposed on Denmark, Norway, Sweden, France, Germany, the United Kingdom, the Netherlands, and Finland starting 1 February 2026, and it would increase to a 25% tariff on 1 June unless Denmark agreed to sell Greenland to the US.

In a message to the Norwegian prime minister Jonas Gahr Støre, that Trump asked be shared widely with world leaders, Trump reiterated his demand for "Complete and Total Control of Greenland [sic]" and ascribed his own attitude therein to not being awarded the 2025 Nobel Peace Prize, writing that he no longer feels an "obligation to think purely of Peace". Støre said that "I have several times clearly explained to Trump what is well known, namely that it is an independent Nobel Committee, and not the Norwegian government, that awards the prize." The prize is awarded for laureates' work in the preceding year; Trump was not in office in 2024.

On 19 January, Trump again refused to rule out invading Greenland and reiterated his tariff threats. On 20 January, Trump reiterated threats, stating that there is "no going back" on his plan to annex Greenland, claiming "Greenland is imperative for national and world security". Trump also indicated that what he called the UK's "stupidity" in transferring the Chagos Islands to Mauritius justified his demands on Greenland. Trump posted an image of a map showing Canada and Greenland as part of the US and an AI image of him along with JD Vance and Marco Rubio planting a US flag on Greenlandic soil.

On 21 January, Trump had asked the chairman of the Joint Chiefs of Staff Dan Caine to present potential options and the impacts of using military force to seize Greenland, ultimately resulting in Trump deciding against an invasion, Trump administration officials told NBC News.

==== Trump's reversals ====
At the World Economic Forum in Davos on 21 January 2026, Trump gave a speech containing numerous false claims about Greenland, Denmark and NATO. He falsely claimed that Greenland is a US territory, despite it being associated with the kingdoms of Denmark and Norway for over a millennium, which was inherited by the Danish Unitary State, and later by modern-day Danish Realm. He stated he would not use military force in his attempt to annex Greenland, while not ruling out economic coercion, insisting on "immediate negotiations" despite Denmark telling him Greenland is not for sale. He appeared to issue a veiled warning to European leaders, stating that they could consent to Washington's annexation of Greenland and earn America's gratitude, or refuse and face the assurance that the United States would "remember". During his speech, Trump also repeatedly confused Iceland with Greenland, which Marco Rubio later confirmed.

Shortly after, Trump abruptly announced that he and NATO secretary general Mark Rutte had "formed the framework of a future deal with respect to Greenland" and withdrew his threats of punitive tariffs against NATO members. Trump said the proposed deal involved military cooperation related to his Golden Dome project and cooperation between Greenland, the United States and European allies on mineral development. Rutte said his discussion with Trump did not cover control of Greenland, instead focusing on broader Arctic security. Danish and NATO officials denied that any deal had been formed that would compromise the sovereignty of the Kingdom of Denmark and Greenland. Both Danish and Greenland officials said sovereignty is not negotiable. Greenland prime minister Múte Egede had previously said the country would be open to strengthening its defence and mining ties with the United States and was ready to start a dialogue with the United States.

EU lawmakers said they would need greater clarity about Trump's intentions, with Bernd Lange stating that "nobody knows exactly what the details of this so-called solution or deal are".

Aaja Chemnitz, one of Greenland's two members of the Danish parliament, said Trump's statements were "completely crazy" and denied the existence of any "deal", stating that "NATO has no mandate whatsoever" to negotiate anything on behalf of Greenland. She said that "total confusion" was being created by Trump's statements. Chemnitz's statement was echoed by another MP who said the claim of a "deal" is "not real" and described the meeting as "not real negotiations, it's two men who have had a conversation". According to Sky News, the supposed deal referred to a meeting where "pre-existing commitments in the 1951 US–Denmark treaty were reemphasised and European nations re-committed to increase their own defence of Greenland", while highlighting the "serious damage to the trans-Atlantic alliance" inflicted by Trump. A NATO spokesperson said, "discussions among NATO allies on the framework [Trump] referenced will focus on ensuring Arctic security through the collective efforts of allies, especially the seven Arctic allies". Greenland prime minister Jens-Frederik Nielsen emphasised that "nobody else than Greenland and the Kingdom of Denmark have the mandate to make deals or agreements about Greenland and the Kingdom of Denmark".

Trump's comments in Davos were described as a great climbdown. Reuters reported that his reversal of policy followed pressure by his own aides opposing an invasion of Greenland. Former American NATO ambassador R. Nicholas Burns said Trump had clearly backed down in the face of tough military, economic, and political resistance from the Europeans that the Trump administration had not calculated. Trump's behaviour during 2025 and 2026 was described as having damaged the United States standing in the world and how allies see the nation in the long term, while resulting in no other outcome than maintaining Greenland's status quo. CNN reported that no actual document exists yet and that the information available indicates that the supposed deal "sounds a lot like what the United States already had", and described the affair as "one of the most erratic episodes involving a modern president on the world stage". Greenlandic politician Tillie Martinussen said: "We can never really trust America again."

Trump's reversal was widely referred to as a TACO moment. The New York Times argued that it showed the "limits of his coercive powers".

==== Partial re-escalation ====
In February, Frederiksen warned that Trump was still "very serious" about acquiring Greenland.

On 21 February, Trump announced that he was sending a "hospital boat" to Greenland, claiming that many Greenlanders were sick and not receiving care. Earlier in the day, the Danish military had announced the evacuation of a crew member from an American submarine for a medical emergency. It is unknown if Trump was getting confused with that incident or was referring to something else. Trump's announcement drew widespread ridicule, with Prime Minister Nielsen saying "It's a no thank you from here" and many noting Greenland (and the Danish Realm) has nationalised healthcare, unlike the United States.

On 8 April, during the 2026 Iran war, Trump posted on Truth Social about NATO allies "not being there" to join the war effort when the US "needed" them, referencing Greenland and referring to it as "that big, poorly run, piece of ice".

On 7 July, during the 2026 Ankara NATO summit, Trump reiterated that the United States should have control of Greenland. Denmark rejected the proposal, with Prime Minister Mette Frederiksen reaffirming that Greenland was not for sale and that its sovereignty must be respected.

=== Security deal and ending of the crisis ===
President Donald Trump (left) signs the security agreement with Denmark's Prime Minister Mette Frederiksen (middle) and Greenland's Prime Minister Jens-Frederik Nielsen (right) during the general debate of the 81st session of the United Nations General Assembly, in New York City, 22 September 2026.

On 18 September, Donald Trump posted on Truth Social that the US, Denmark, and Greenland had agreed to a new security deal that addressed all of the US's concerns, and provided for a larger US military footprint. Trump claimed that the deal gives the US "permanent control" over security in Greenland, while officials from Denmark and Greenland said that the deal does not transfer sovereignty of Greenland to the US. Trump also said that his administration would begin cooperating with local authorities to maintain a "large Military presence in the appropriate part of Greenland, of which there are many." An anonymous State Department official said the deal would remain in effect even if Greenland became independent in the future, that it bans non-NATO states from maintaining a military presence in Greenland; bars investments in Greenland by Russia and China, and grants the US permanent rights to install military bases and use Greenland's airspace. US Secretary of State Marco Rubio said that the deal "permanently and completely addresses our national security concerns in Greenland" and described it as a "huge win for the United States and the American people."

Danish Prime Minister Mette Frederiksen said the deal strengthens "security in the Arctic and the North Atlantic area" and that the deal would be signed at the upcoming United Nations General Assembly. She did not discuss specific policies and stressed that it required parliamentary approval to be enacted. Greenland Prime Minister Jens-Frederik Nielsen called the deal "gratifying" and "for the benefit of us all."

On 22 September 2026, during the general debate of the eighty-first session of the United Nations General Assembly, the United States, Denmark, and Greenland signed a security agreement that increases US involvement in Greenland's defence while affirming Danish sovereignty and Greenland's right to self-determination.

== Response ==
=== Danish legal framework ===
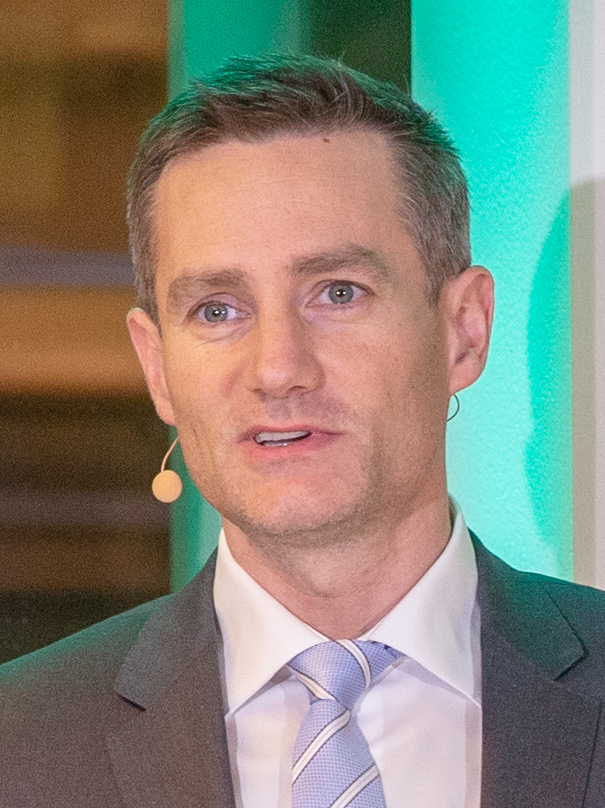
The chairman of the Danish government's Defence Committee, Conservative Rasmus Jarlov, said that Denmark would defend its territory and invoke Article 5 of NATO if attacked by the US.

In January 2026, Thomas Crosbie, an American military expert working at the Royal Danish Defence College, said that any attempt to seize Greenland would constitute a criminal act, and that Denmark, with the backing of its allies, would have the legal right to arrest any Americans involved in such actions and prosecute them under Danish criminal law. Danish troops in Greenland are legally obligated to defend Danish territory under military law. Under a 1952 standing order, Danish troops are ordered to "immediately take up the fight without waiting for, or seeking orders" in "the event of an attack on Danish territory". The Danish government confirmed in January 2026 that the order remains in place and that Danish soldiers would shoot back if Greenland is attacked.

The Ministry of Defence said Danish troops would immediately respond to an invasion of Greenland with force and the chairman of the Defence Committee, Rasmus Jarlov, said Denmark would invoke Article 5 if attacked by the US. Jarlov said an American attack would mean war with Denmark and that retaliation would include deadly force. As of January 2026, Article 5 has been invoked only once in NATO history: in response to the September 11 attacks on the US in 2001, when Denmark volunteered "to fight alongside American soldiers in two different conflicts ... [deploying] tens of thousands of troops to Afghanistan and Iraq over two decades ... [suffering] the third-highest per capita casualty rate".

=== Military and intelligence response ===
==== Danish Realm ====
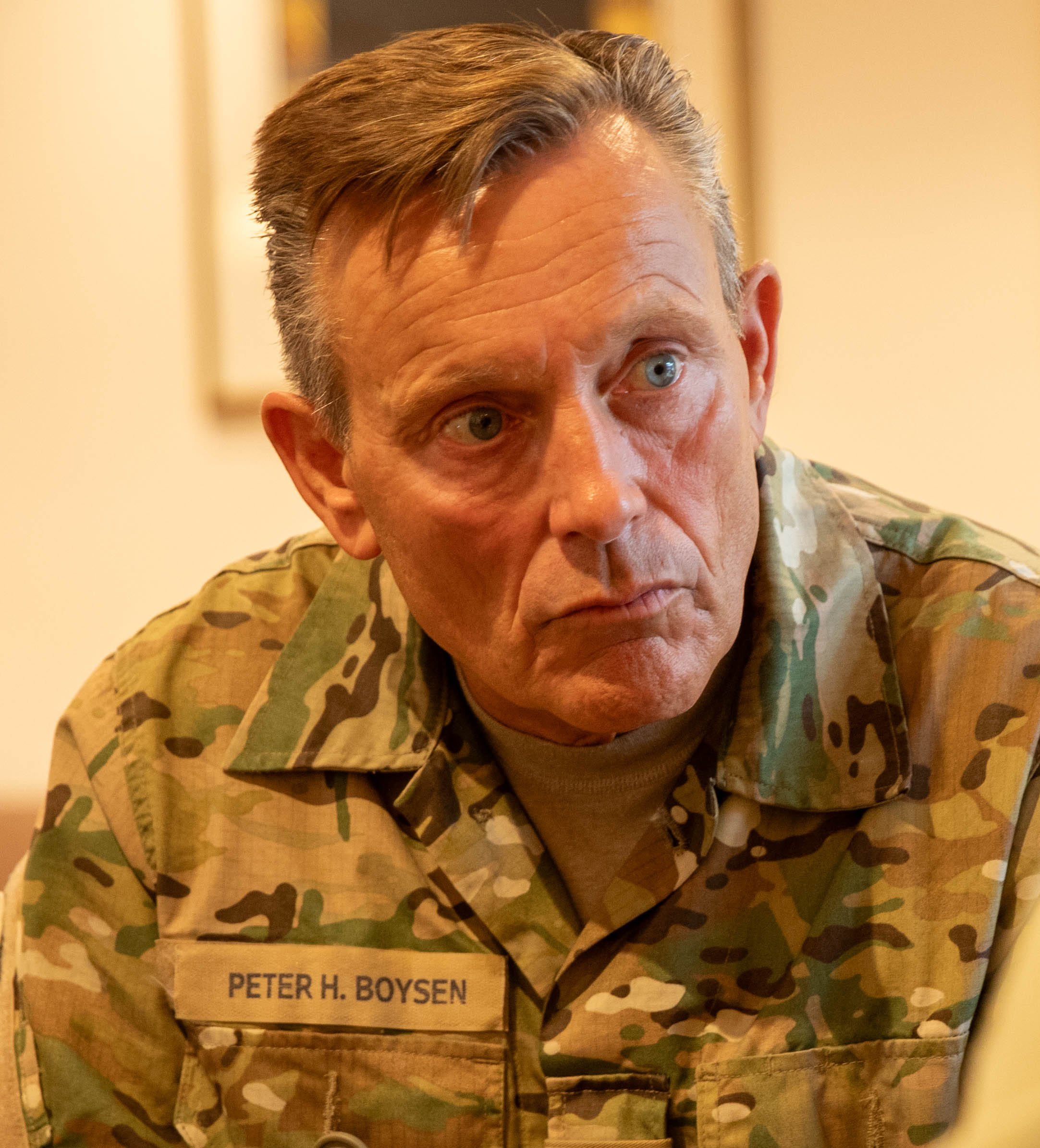
General Peter Harling Boysen, the Chief of the Royal Danish Army, arrived in Greenland with a "substantial" force on 19–20 January 2026, saying he is ready to defend Greenland. General Boysen has extensive experience from international warzones and special operations.

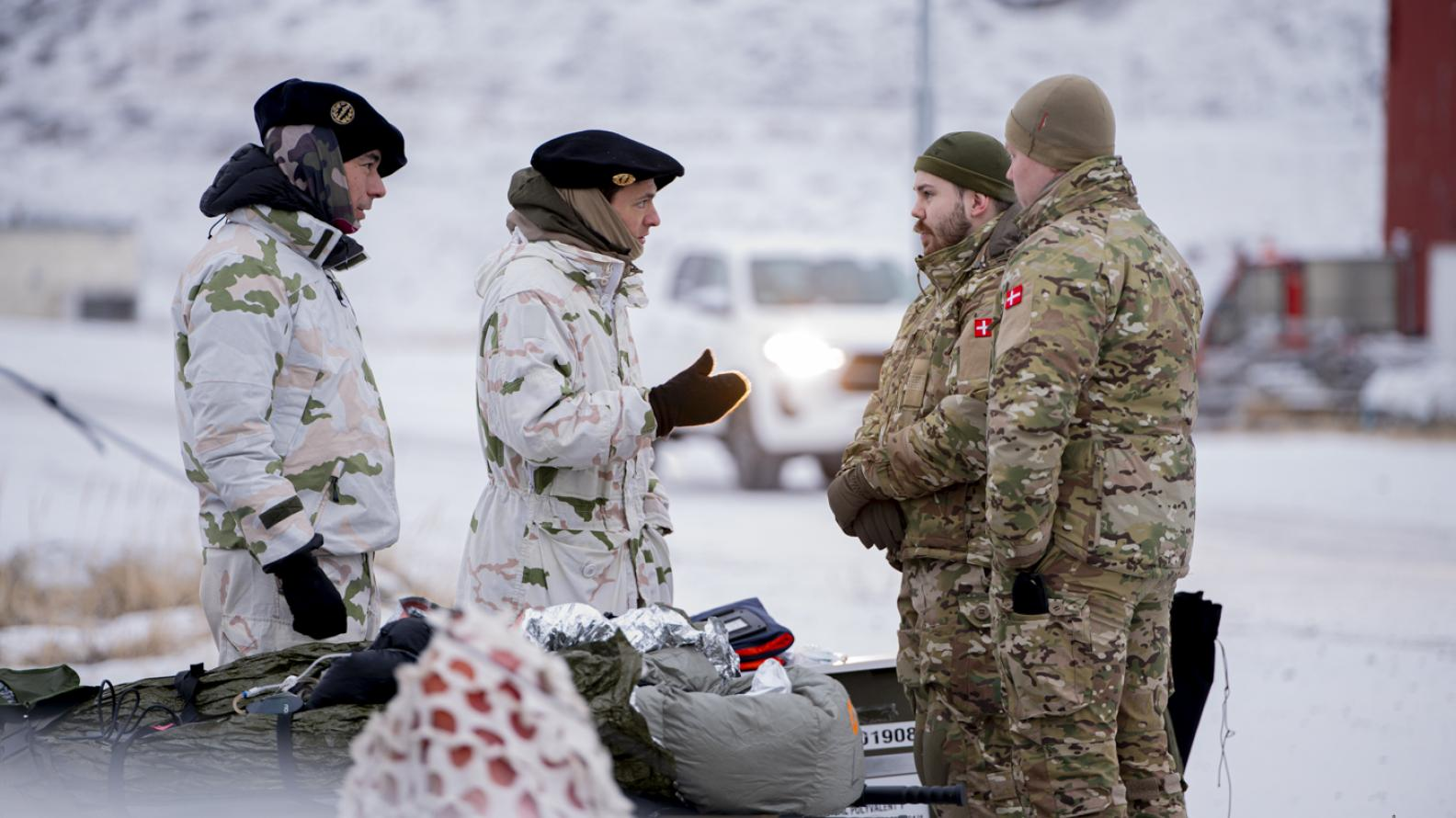
Danish and French soldiers during Operation Arctic Endurance, widely considered a tripwire force to deter a US invasion

Shortly after the start of the crisis, the Danish Realm began rapidly expanding its military presence in the Arctic. On 27 January 2025, its governments agreed to the First Agreement on the Arctic and North Atlantic, which invested a total of kr. 14.6 billion (US$2.05 billion) into warning systems in the Faroe Islands and Greenland, new naval vessels, drone warfare training, a new radiation monitoring station in East Greenland, upgrades to the Joint Arctic Command in Nuuk and intelligence, satellite surveillance, two new coastal radars, and Arctic basic military training in Kangerlussuaq. This was followed by the Second Agreement on 10 October 2025, providing upgrades worth kr. 27.4 billion (US$4.26 billion) for improvements of what was presented in the First Agreement, alongside upgrades to Kangerlussuaq Airport, a new specialised Arctic unit under the Jaeger Corps of the Special Operations Command that could operate anywhere in Greenland, establishment of radar capability in East Greenland, establishment of a Greenlandic reconnaissance Unit, and the construction of a new undersea cable connecting Greenland to mainland Denmark.

In summer 2025, the Greenlandic government and the Danish Defence both announced that Greenland would have increased military presence by September, as part of Operation Arctic Light. On 18 August 2025, the Ministry of Justice allocated a package worth more than kr. 850 million to their operations in Greenland and the Faroe Islands. Alongside promotions of general law enforcement and upgrades to courts, the package also provided funding for strengthening the PET's activities in the North Atlantic, and provided new maritime equipment to Greenlandic and Faroese police in response to the crisis.

By 19 January 2026, a total of over kr. 88 billion (US$13.7 billion) had been committed to "strengthen defense and security in the Arctic", with kr. 29 billion allocated to acquiring F-35 fighter jets alone, and kr. 27.8 billion for anti-aircraft warfare, according to the Ministry of Defence, and at that point Denmark had sent 200 additional soldiers to Greenland. On the same day, more soldiers together with the Chief of the Royal Danish Army, General Peter Harling Boysen, started arriving in Greenland, and Denmark announced that a "substantial contribution" of its armed forces would be sent there. Also on 19 January, Defence Minister Troels Lund Poulsen and Greenlandic Minister of Foreign Affairs Vivian Motzfeldt met NATO secretary general Rutte and their Nordic Security ministers in Brussels about the situation in Greenland. General Boysen said he is ready to defend Greenland. According to Boysen, the soldiers landed in Kangerlussuaq in western Greenland.

On 20 January 2026, Denmark deployed additional troops to Greenland, sending dozens of soldiers and senior military leadership to the Arctic territory to reinforce its presence and participate in ongoing multinational exercises, increasing the Danish Armed Forces' personnel stationed there amid heightened international tensions. The same day, Greenland's government mulled the creation of a task force with representatives from local authorities to prepare residents for potential disruptions to daily life, including guidance recommending that households keep five days of food supplies. Additionally, PM Jens-Frederik Nielsen stated that a military conflict could not be ruled out.

The Joint Arctic Command announced plans to expand its military exercises, potentially conducting them on a year-round basis. A Danish defence analyst interviewed by Times Radio said Denmark discussed plans to station around 1,000 Danish ground forces in Greenland, in addition to other capabilities and allied contributions. An investigation by Times Radio suggested that it would be very hard for the US to successfully invade Greenland due to a combination of lack of US Arctic capabilities, the geography of Greenland, and Danish knowledge of the area, preparedness and Arctic training.

==== International collaboration ====
Many NATO countries began deploying troops to Greenland as part of Operation Arctic Endurance in response to the crisis. Status as of 29 January 2026: United States Greenland / Participants Rest of NATO

On 14 January 2026, Denmark started to send military reinforcements to Greenland to strengthen its military presence. Later that day, it became known that both Sweden and Norway sent military forces to support the Danish Defence in protecting Greenland. The Ministry of Defence on 14 January 2026 announced "an increased military presence in and around Greenland, comprising aircraft, vessels and soldiers, including from NATO allies". After consultations between a group of European countries, Germany announced it was sending a small contingent to Greenland on a reconnaissance mission with other European nations. On 15 January 2026, a French military contingent arrived in Greenland.

On 16 January, Danish F-35 and French A330 MRTT jets conducted a training mission in southeast Greenland. On 17 January, Major General Søren Andersen stated that at least 100 units have arrived in Nuuk, and another 100 in Kangerlussuaq. By 18 January, the deployment involved Belgium, France, Germany, Sweden, Norway, Finland, the Netherlands, the United Kingdom, Estonia, Slovenia, and Iceland, with Estonia's deployment yet to be executed. French president Emmanuel Macron stated that the deployment would soon be reinforced with land, air, and sea assets as part of Operation Arctic Endurance. Denmark is planning a larger and more permanent NATO presence.

On 18 January, Germany's reconnaissance team returned to Germany, with the Bundeswehr stating that the mission to plan for future engagements had been "completed, as planned". On 19 January it became known that Canada considered sending troops to Greenland to reinforce Danish sovereignty.

Despite Poland's recent interest and participation in military exercises in the Arctic region, and having signed a bilateral defence agreement with Denmark in the 1990s, Polish prime minister Donald Tusk and Defence Minister Władysław Kosiniak-Kamysz stated that Poland would not deploy troops in Greenland. This decision was criticised by former Major General Roman Polko as "sheer cowardice", to which Kosiniak-Kamysz defended it as protecting NATO unity.

Between 19 January and 3 February, NORAD deployed their aircraft to Pituffik Space Base in Greenland for long-planned activities, describing the deployment as routine and coordinated with the Kingdom of Denmark with diplomatic clearances and with the Government of Greenland informed of the planned operations.

On 21 January, France proposed a larger NATO exercise in Greenland and said they are willing to participate.

==== Operation Arctic Sentry ====
On 11 February, NATO launched Operation Arctic Sentry, a military exercise led by JFC Norfolk aimed to strengthen NATO's posture in the Arctic, with Supreme Allied Commander Europe Alexus Grynkewich stating that it "underscores the alliance's commitment to safeguard its members and maintain stability." While the operation is not intended to be permanent, Canadian Foreign Affairs minister Anita Anand urges it to be otherwise, commenting that "defending the Arctic is defending NATO's northern flank and North America itself".

Despite being officially intended to counter Sino–Russian threats in the Arctic, Operation Arctic Sentry has often been interpreted that it's largely meant to "appease Trump" regarding Greenland instead.

According to Deutsche Welle, participating countries would include the United States, Canada, Denmark, Norway, Sweden, Finland, and Iceland.

==== Invasion preparedness ====
The Greenlandic government has asked citizens to prepare for a possible attack on Greenland by the United States, including by stockpiling supplies.

According to a report by Danish broadcaster DR, published in March 2026, Danish forces also prepared defensive measures in early 2026, including the deployment of special forces units and the pre-positioning of medical supplies such as blood for potential casualties. Troops reportedly brought explosives intended to disable key airstrips in Nuuk and Kangerlussuaq to prevent American landings.

=== "Hands off Greenland" anti-Trump protests ===
Large anti-Trump protests, named "Hands off Greenland", took place across Greenland and Denmark on 17 January to protest against Trump's threats against Greenland. The solidarity protests are organised by Greenlandic associations in Copenhagen, Aarhus, Aalborg, Odense and Nuuk. Uagut, an association of Greenlanders in Denmark, said the aim of the protests is to send a message of respect for Greenland's democracy and fundamental human rights. In Copenhagen, thousands of Greenlanders and Danes filled City Hall Square. Protesters chanted "Greenland is not for sale" and "Kalaallit Nunaat" (Note: "Greenland" in the Greenlandic language) and marched to the US embassy in Copenhagen in solidarity with Greenlanders. The slogan "Make America Go Away" soared in popularity in response to the protests, becoming a symbol of anti-Trump defiance. (Note: Attributed to multiple references:)

In addition to earlier protests, on 21 May 2026, after the opening of a new United States consulate in Nuuk, hundreds of people protested in the capital of Greenland. Demonstrators chanted slogans such as "Greenland for Greenlanders", opposing the expansion of American diplomatic presence in the autonomous territory.

== US–EU trade war ==
In response to Operation Arctic Endurance and European countries' refusal to support his annexation of Greenland, Trump threatened to increase tariffs against several EU and NATO members, reigniting concerns of a US-EU trade war. Trump said he would impose tariffs on any trading partner that did not support American annexation of Greenland.

In January 2026, he threatened Denmark, Norway, Sweden, France, Germany, the United Kingdom, the Netherlands, and Finland with tariffs of up to 25% tariffs until they supported his takeover of Greenland, stating that they had "journeyed to Greenland, for purposes unknown. This is a very dangerous situation for the Safety, Security, and Survival of our Planet". On 21 January, Trump announced that he would not impose the tariffs, having agreed to a deal with NATO secretary general Mark Rutte.

=== European response ===
In response to Trump's threats, EU leaders promised a firm, EU-wide joint response. European Council president António Costa said the EU will be "very firm in defending international law ... starting within the territory of the European Union's member states". European Commission president Ursula von der Leyen promised an "unflinching, united and proportional" response. Kaja Kallas, the EU's High Representative for Foreign Affairs and Security Policy, said China and Russia "must be having a field day" as a result of Trump's tariffs. The EU Parliament suspended approval of a proposed EU–US trade agreement on 21 January, and substantial retaliatory tariffs against the US were readied.

French president Macron described Trump's threats as unacceptable and said that "no intimidation nor threat will influence us, neither in Ukraine, nor in Greenland". Norwegian prime minister Jonas Gahr Støre condemned Trump's threats and wrote that "Norway's position is firm: Greenland is part of the Kingdom of Denmark. Norway fully supports the sovereignty of the Kingdom of Denmark." British prime minister Keir Starmer said Trump's trade war is "completely wrong". Danish prime minister Mette Frederiksen said Europe would not be blackmailed by Trump. A joint statement by Denmark, Finland, France, Germany, the Netherlands, Norway, Sweden and the United Kingdom emphasised the principles of sovereignty and territorial integrity and accused Trump of creating a "dangerous downward spiral" with his threats. On 18 January, ambassadors from all 27 member states of the EU held an emergency meeting on Trump's threats. After Trump reversed his decision on implementing tariffs, EU officials were sceptical, but announced on 22 January that approval of the trade agreement would resume.

==== Anti-Coercion Instrument ====
Several European leaders including France's Emmanuel Macron advocated using the EU's Anti-Coercion Instrument, a security and trade policy tool known as the "trade bazooka", to target the United States in retaliation. Under the not-previously-used instrument, the EU may adopt countermeasures, sometimes described as sanctions, including tariffs, restrictions on public procurement, and measures affecting trade and investment. Bernd Lange, chair of the European Parliament Committee on International Trade, supported its activation. By 21 January EU countries were described as being increasingly open to using the ACI against the United States, with Germany stating it will ask the Commission to explore its use.

=== US opposition ===
Senior Republicans as well as Democrats described Trump's tariff threats as bad for the United States, bad for business, and a strategic gift to Vladimir Putin and Xi Jinping. On the other hand, Trump said that Greenland was a US national security priority because he did not want Russia or China as neighbours, although Russia is already a neighbour of the United States; at their closest points, the American island of Little Diomede and the Russian island of Big Diomede in the Bering Strait are only 3.8 km (2.4 mi) away from each other. (Note: In contrast, at their closest the US and Greenland are 1,973 km (1,226 mi) away from each other.) Senate minority leader Chuck Schumer announced that Democrats would introduce legislation to block any tariffs "before they do further damage to the American economy and our allies in Europe".

=== Russian reaction ===
Russia welcomed Trump's tariffs against its NATO allies, with Kremlin officials saying it was evidence that the transatlantic alliance was collapsing. The Russian government newspaper Rossiyskaya Gazeta praised Trump's push to take over Greenland and welcomed the strain it was causing between the US and Europe.

== Reactions ==
=== Danish Realm ===
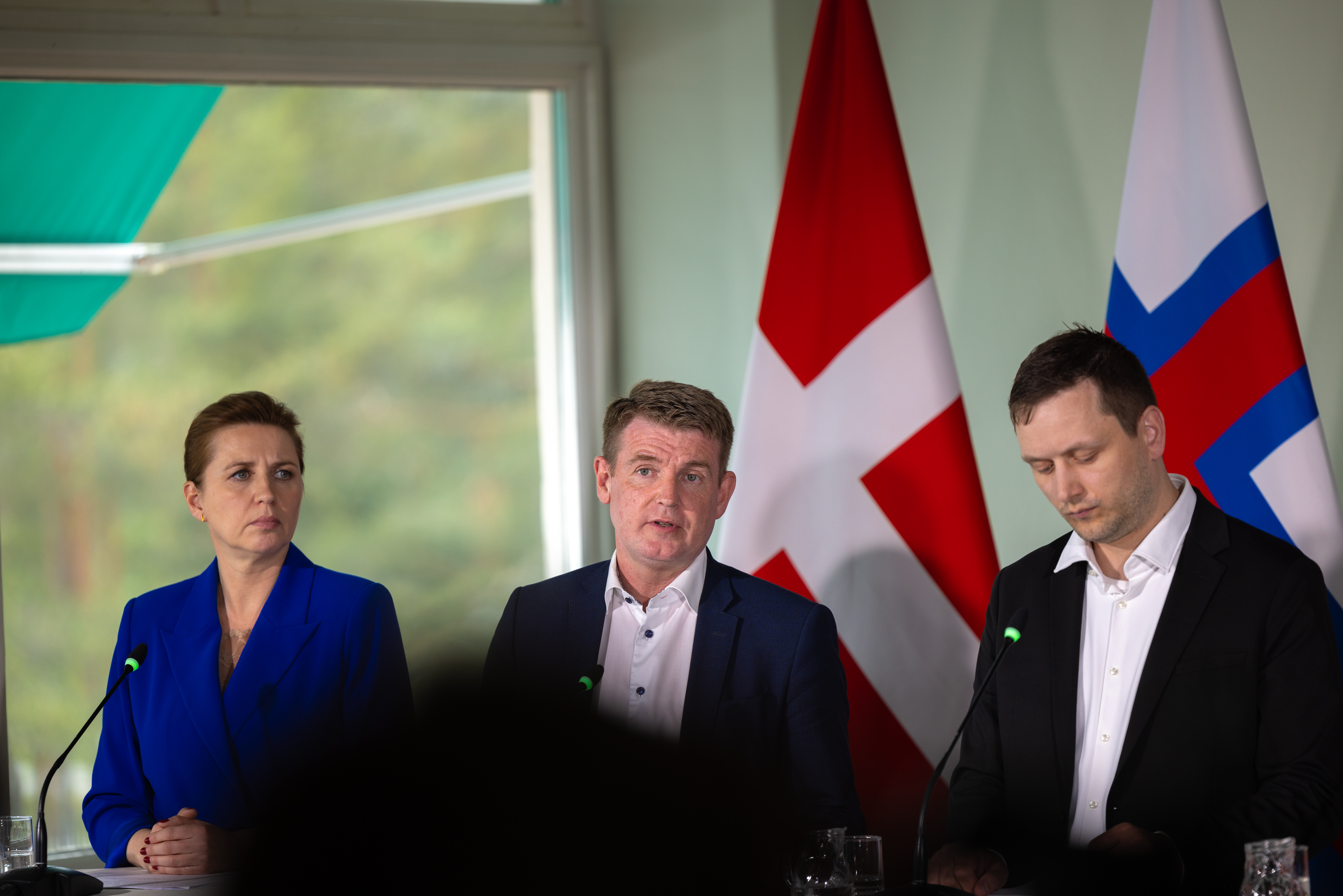
From left to right: Prime Ministers Mette Frederiksen, Aksel V. Johannesen, and Jens-Frederik Nielsen in Finland, May 2025.

On 16 and 17 June 2025, the governments of Greenland, Denmark, and the Faroe Islands participated in their biannual meeting in Tórshavn in light of the crisis. While Danish prime minister Mette Frederiksen didn't want to elaborate on her negotiations with Greenland and the Faroe Islands at the time, she called for unity among all three governments of the Kingdom of Denmark, with Faroese PM Aksel V. Johannesen calling for more foreign policy autonomy for the Faroe Islands.

In response to US threats against Greenland and the Kingdom of Denmark, Prime Minister Mette Frederiksen reminded Trump that an attack on the Kingdom of Denmark is an attack on NATO and that all members are obligated to come to Denmark's defence, urging the US to cease its threats, which threaten the existence of NATO and the security framework established since the end of World War II.

The official Danish threat assessment published by the Danish Defence Intelligence Service in 2025 for the first time mentioned the US as a threat to national security, alongside Russia and China. In response to American influence operations, both Prime Minister Mette Frederiksen and King Frederik X visited the Danish territory. After Trump resumed his threats in December 2025, Foreign Minister Lars Løkke Rasmussen insisted on respect for the territorial integrity of the Kingdom of Denmark.

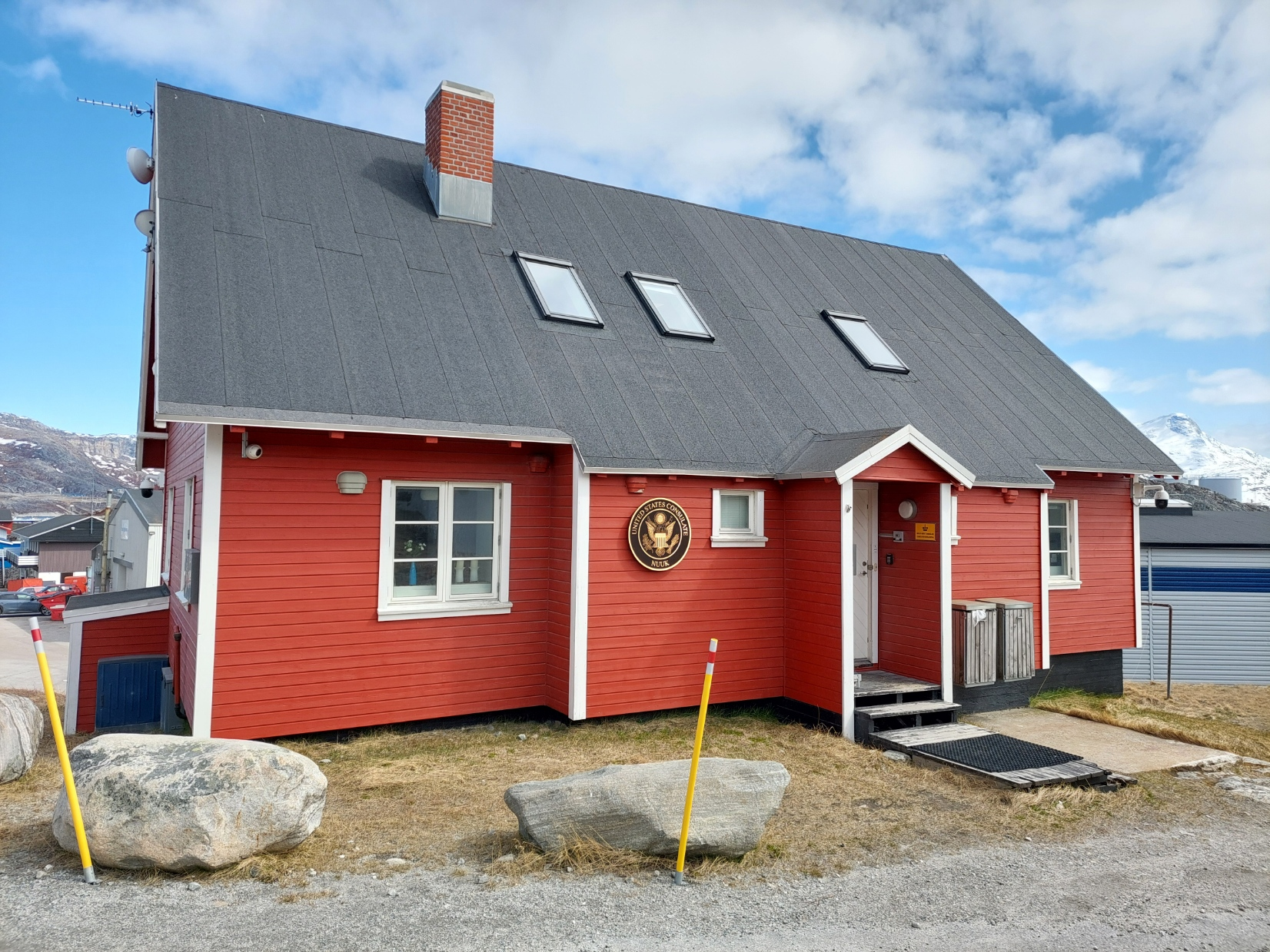
US consulate in Nuuk. Danish politicians have called for its closure.

Danish politicians have called for closing the US consulate in Greenland over its role in undermining Danish sovereignty. Former Danish foreign minister Per Stig Møller said Trump's behaviour has destroyed the US relationship with Denmark and compared it to German demands on Polish territory in the 1930s. Former Danish European Commissioner Margrethe Vestager called Trump's threats an existential threat for NATO and Europe. Rasmus Jarlov stated in an interview that a US military invasion of Greenland would constitute a war, with Denmark and the US fighting each other.

Former Danish prime minister and NATO secretary general Anders Fogh Rasmussen said the US actions are widely seen as a betrayal in Denmark. Rasmussen emphasised that Greenland is not for sale, that Greenlanders don't want to become part of the US, and that the only way for the US to take it would be to invade the Kingdom of Denmark and destroy NATO. He said Denmark has no other choice than to defend its territory, and that non-resistance is not an option. He further said that Trump is "the biggest threat to world peace." He said Trump speaks like a gangster in his threats against Greenland. He also stated that time for "flattering Trump" was over while suggesting hard economic actions by Europe. He also suggested the establishment of a "European NATO" without the US.

On 23 January 2026, Danish prime minister Mette Frederiksen visited Greenland to express support for the people and the island's self-governing government, following comments by US president Donald Trump indicating his willingness to annex the territory. Trump had previously discussed strengthening security in the Arctic region with NATO secretary general Mark Rutte. Both the Danish and Greenlandic governments have affirmed that the island's sovereignty is indisputable, but remain open to discussions on issues such as security and economic development. The crisis eased after Trump withdrew threats of force and new tariffs.

==== Greenland ====
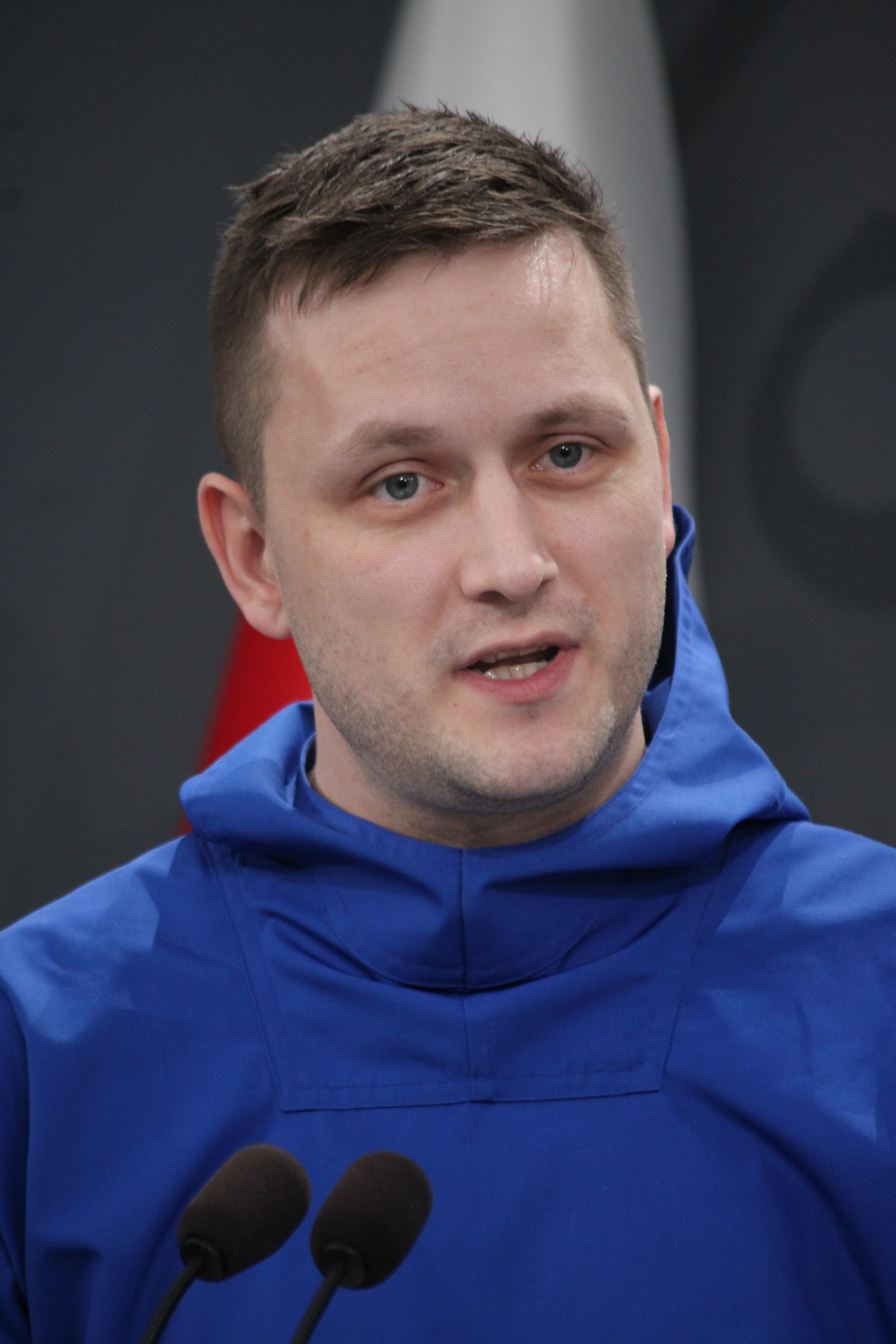
Greenland's prime minister Jens-Frederik Nielsen said that Trump would not "get" Greenland.

In response to US threats, Greenland's prime minister Jens-Frederik Nielsen said Trump would not "get" Greenland and that it is not for sale. The US threats have caused a pause in independence discussions, which Nielsen promoted during the previous elections. The PM stated that, "when faced with the choice between US and Denmark, Greenland chooses Denmark". A joint statement published by all parties in the Parliament of Greenland demanded that the US show respect and that they do not want to become part of the US, that they "do not want to be Americans." Greenland has moved to ban foreign political funding in response to US interference.

2025 and 2026 saw large demonstrations against the US in Greenland, with Greenlanders emphasising that "we are not for sale". Demonstrators carried placards bearing the slogans "no means no", "stop threatening us", and "Yankee go home!" On 12 January 2026, the government of Greenland issued a statement that they can "not under any circumstances" accept US demands for Greenland to become part of the US and that "Greenland is part of the Kingdom of Denmark", underlining the role of NATO in its defence. The government welcomed the initiative by six NATO members (reported to be the UK, Germany, France, Italy, Poland, and Spain) to increase NATO activity in Greenland.

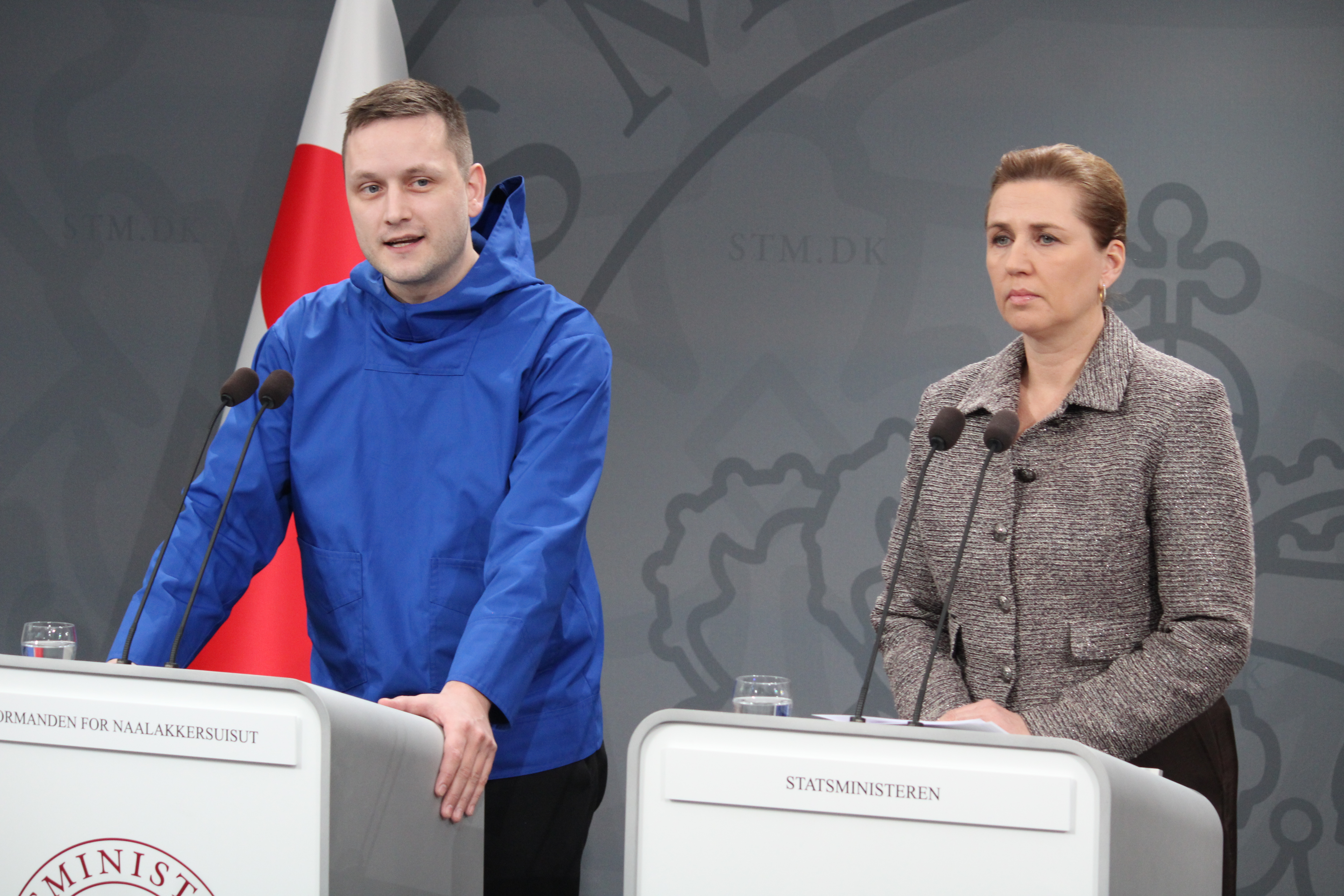
Jens-Frederik Nielsen announcing "We choose Denmark" at a press conference with Mette Frederiksen in response to Trump's threats to invade or annex the country, 13 January 2026

In a joint statement on 13 January 2026, the prime ministers of Greenland and Denmark said that Greenland was facing an "unacceptable pressure" campaign and a "geopolitical crisis" caused by the US. They said that Greenland is not for sale under any circumstances. Frederiksen said, "our message is clear: Greenland is not for sale" and "you can't buy another people". Nielsen emphasised that talk about buying another people shows a lack of respect, and that Greenland does not want to be owned nor governed by the US. Greenlandic politicians have welcomed a NATO mission in Greenland to protect the island following Trump's threats.

==== Faroe Islands ====
On 21 November 2025, Danish Defence Minister Troels Lund Poulsen visited the Faroe Islands, where both parties discussed Faroese participation regarding the situation in Greenland. Faroese Speaker of the Løgting Bjørt Samuelsen sent an official letter of support to their Greenlandic counterpart, Kim Kielsen. Denmark and NATO did not deploy troops to the Faroe Islands as part of Operation Arctic Endurance.

=== United States ===
==== Support ====
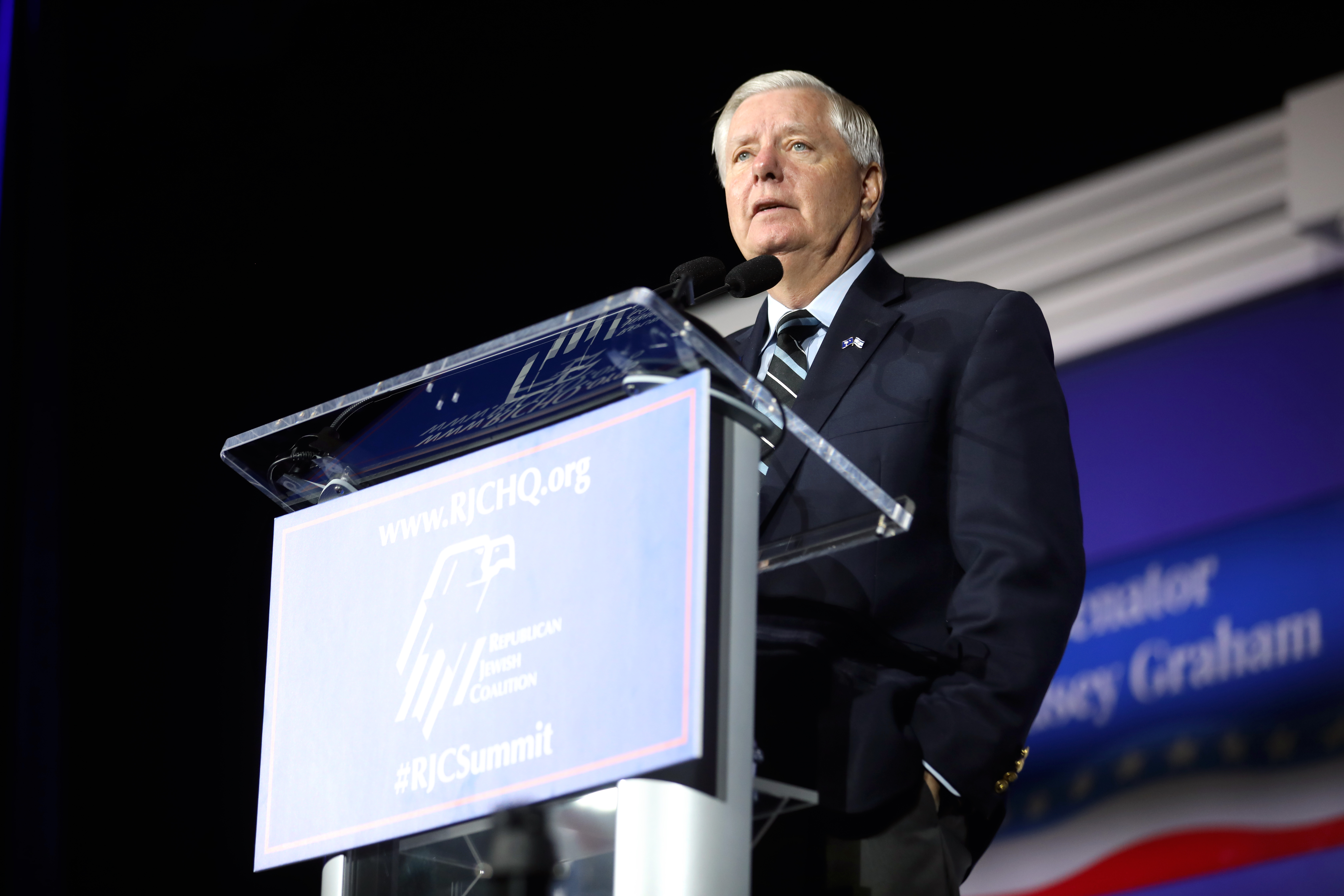
US senator and Trump ally Lindsey Graham urged Europeans to allow the United States to take control of Greenland and dismissed European discomfort over Trump's annexation threats.

US president Donald Trump stated his belief that the EU would not "push back too much". US treasury secretary Scott Bessent stated that both NATO and Greenland were essential to United States national security. Interior Secretary Doug Burgum argued that Europeans should be "cheering" for the United States to acquire Greenland from Denmark because of it being critical to American and European security. On January, senator Lindsey Graham, a close ally of Trump, urged Europeans to allow the United States to control Greenland and criticised them as being "weak and humorless" on social media. The following month at the 62nd Munich Security Conference, he was asked at a Politico interview what he would say to Europeans who were nervous about Greenland. Graham responded, "Greenland is behind us, but the goal is to get outcomes. Who gives a shit who owns Greenland? I don't." Afterward according to sources reporting to Puck and Berlingske, he met with the Greenlandic and Danish prime ministers, swearing at them often and disrespecting them by yawning loudly and calling the latter "little lady."

==== Opposition ====
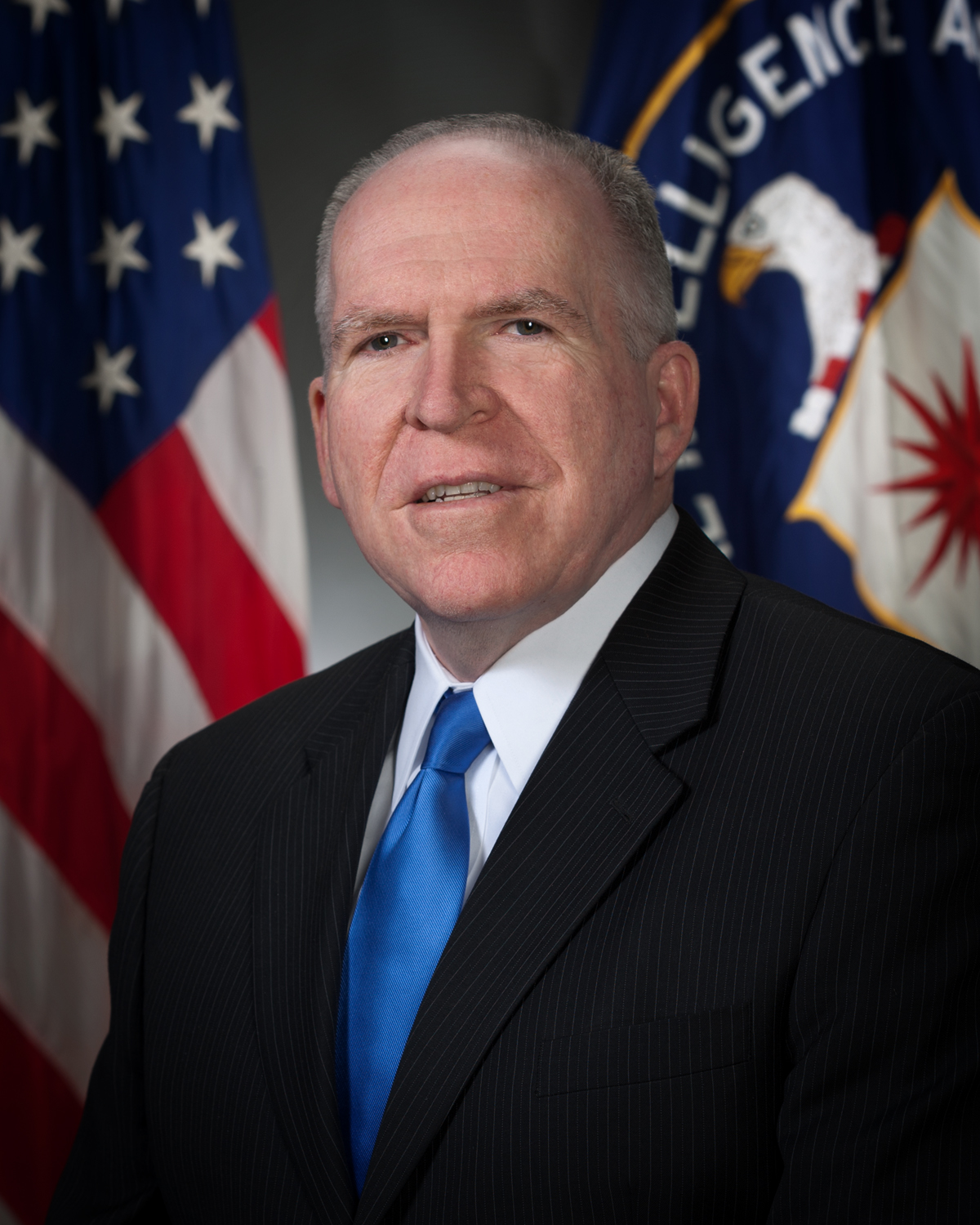
Former CIA director John O. Brennan said Americans were ashamed of Trump's threats against Greenland.

Former CIA director John O. Brennan called it "outrageous that we are threatening Denmark" and that there is a "sense of shame" among Americans over Trump's international behaviour. US Republican senator Thom Tillis and Democratic senator Jeanne Shaheen, co-chairs of the Senate NATO Observer Group, said that "the United States must honor its treaty obligations and respect Greenland and Denmark's sovereignty and territorial integrity". Republican senator Roger Wicker, the Senate Armed Services chair, said Trump's threats to seize Greenland was "a topic that should be dropped" and cautioned Trump against spending time "antagonizing allies". After meeting Danish officials, Wicker said it was clear that there was no room for negotiation and that Trump's attempt to obtain Greenland was not realistic.

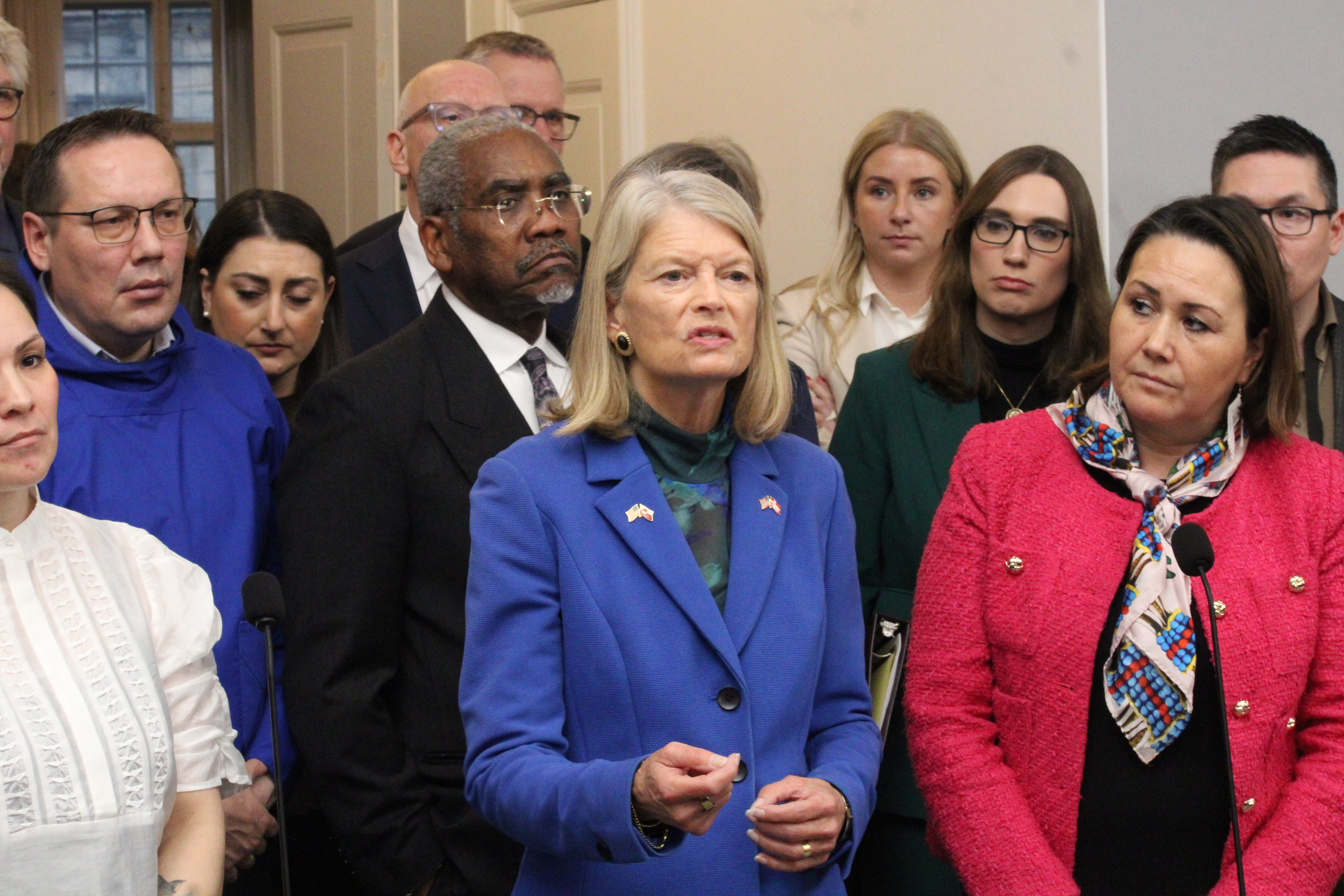
Lisa Murkowski speaking during a press conference with Danish, Greenlandic and US politicians at Christiansborg in Copenhagen, 16 January 2026

Mitch McConnell, who led Trump's Republican Party in the Senate from 2007 to 2025, characterised attempts to seize Greenland as "trampling the sovereignty, respect, and trust of our allies" and that "the use of force ... would be an especially catastrophic act of strategic self-harm to America and its global influence". Republican senator Susan Collins and Speaker of the House of Representatives Mike Johnson called the threats and possible US military actions as "completely inappropriate". In mid-January, a delegation of US congresspeople from both major political parties, including senators Chris Coons, Lisa Murkowski, Jeanne Shaheen, and Thom Tillis, travelled to Copenhagen to meet with Danish and Greenlandic officials to underscore the value of their partnership. Former assistant secretary of state for arms control, verification, and compliance Frank A. Rose, the last US official to negotiate a defence agreement with Denmark, said Trump's behaviour threatened to undermine the access the United States had to the Danish territory, since, under the 1951 agreement, the US already had all the military access it needed.

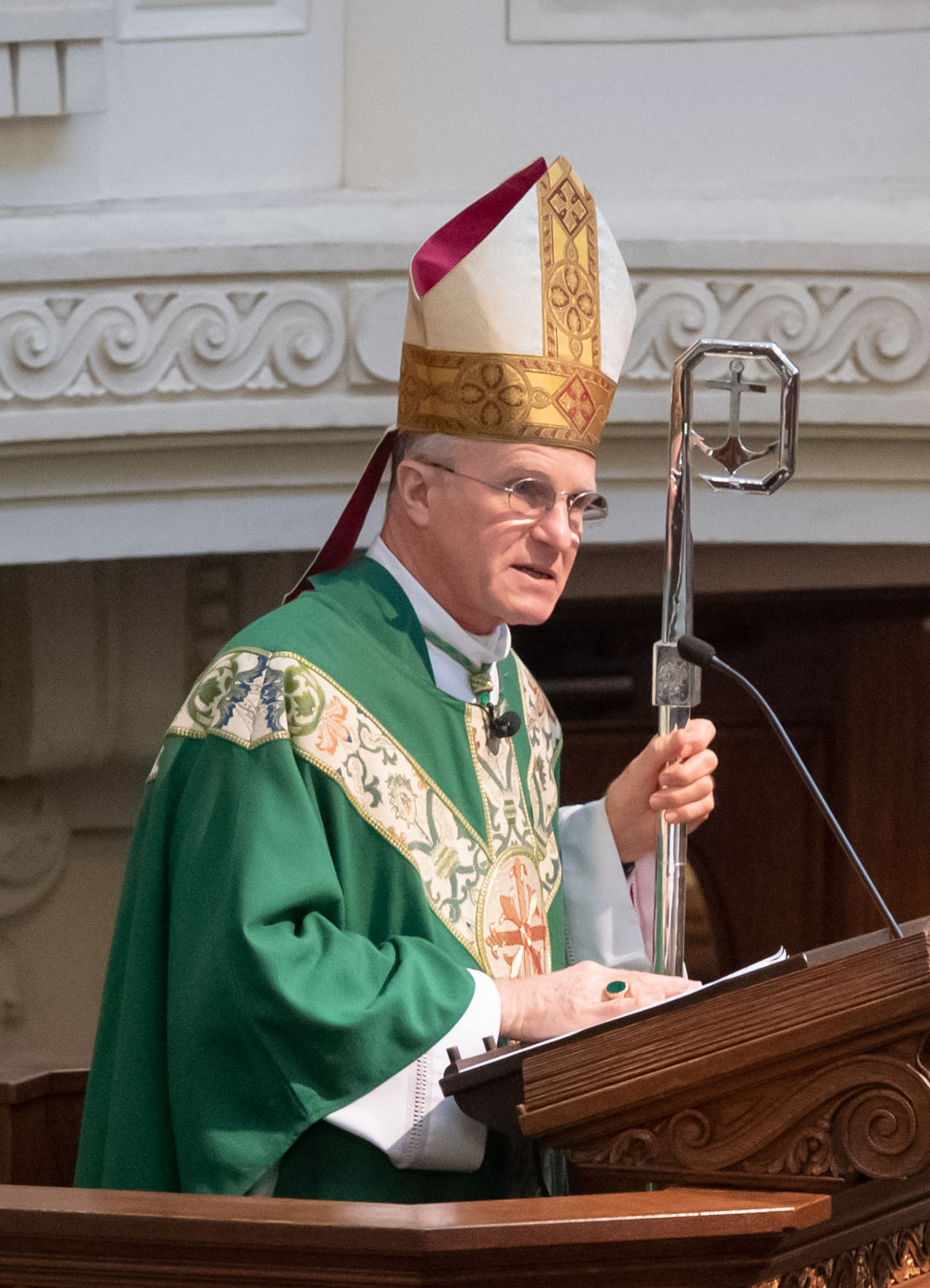
US archbishop for the Military Services Timothy Broglio stated that American troops could in good conscience refuse orders to invade Greenland.

On 7 January 2026, US senator Ruben Gallego introduced a resolution in the US senate to block Trump from invading Greenland. A few days later, Democratic and Republican senators introduced the bipartisan No Funds for NATO Invasion Act, which prohibits the use of federal funds for the invasion of any NATO member state or NATO-protected territory, as well as the bipartisan NATO Unity Protection Act to "prohibit the use of US Department of Defense or Department of State funds to blockade, occupy, annex or otherwise assert control over the sovereign territory of a NATO member state without that ally's consent or authorization from the North Atlantic Council", introduced by Republican senator Lisa Murkowski and Democratic senator Jeanne Shaheen. According to Murkowski, the Act seeks to stop Trump's threats against Greenland. Timothy Broglio, the Archbishop for the Military Services, USA, and former president of the United States Conference of Catholic Bishops, said Trump's actions tarnish the image of the US and that it would be morally acceptable for US soldiers to disobey "morally questionable" orders to attack Greenland. Former Trump spokesperson Sarah Matthews said Trump's Greenland threats were "the most mentally ill, deranged thing" he had done.

In particular, opposition lawmakers were quick to condemn the communique to Norway about the Nobel Prize, widely questioning Trump's mental fitness for office: Andy Kim, who sits on the House Foreign Affairs Committee, described it as "unhinged and embarrassing", and Chris Murphy of the Senate Foreign Affairs Committee as "the ramblings of a man who has lost touch with reality". American historian Anne Applebaum wrote that Trump is "maniacally, unhealthily obsessive" about the Nobel Peace Prize and uses it as justification for an invasion of Greenland.

Gavin Newsom criticised Europe's response to Trump's tariff threats as weak and "pathetic" while speaking on the sidelines of the World Economic Forum in and called on EU leaders to present a unified and more assertive stance toward the US.

Experts said a US invasion of Greenland would violate US law and could spark a constitutional crisis.

A poll from YouGov in mid-January found only 8% of Americans supported using military force to take Greenland from Denmark, with 73% opposition. "Buying" Greenland had only 28% support, with 45% opposition.

==== Expatriate Americans ====
Stephen Barnes, an American law professor based in Oslo, said that Americans in Europe now feel like Russians did in the aftermath of the 2022 Russian invasion of Ukraine. He expressed a deep sense of shame and embarrassment among Americans, adding that he considers the reaction justified.

==== Potential third impeachment ====
Republican congressman Don Bacon predicted an invasion of Greenland would lead to the immediate impeachment of Trump with Republican support. Bacon said he would lean towards impeaching Trump and that many Republicans are angry about Trump's threats against Greenland, emphasising that Trump would need to back off if he wished to save his presidency.

=== European Union and NATO members ===
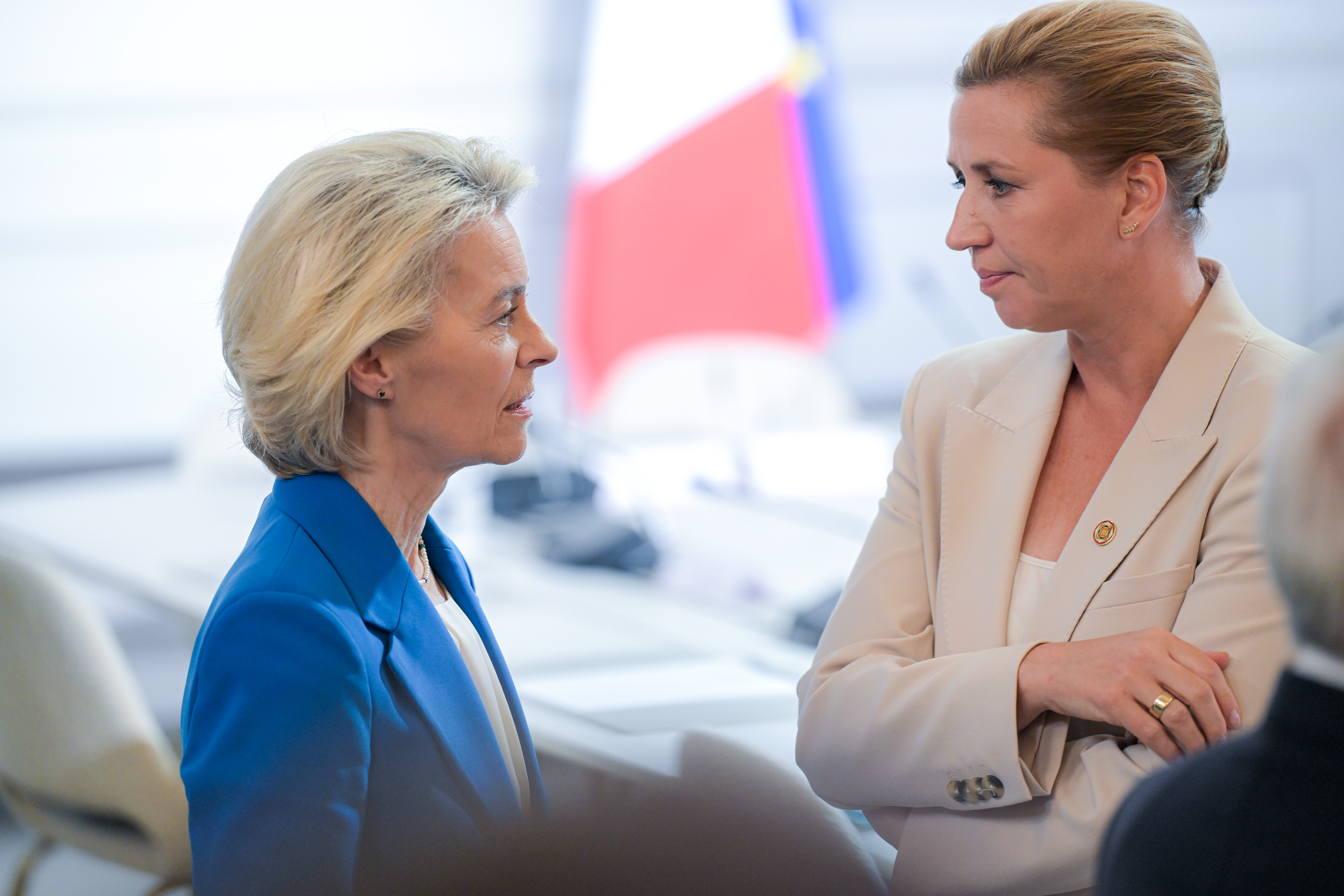
Danish prime minister Mette Frederiksen (right) urged "the United States to cease its threats against a historically close ally", while European Commission president Ursula von der Leyen (left) said that the EU stands in "full solidarity with Denmark and the people of Greenland".

Private text message sent to Donald Trump

"From président [sic] Macron to President Trump,

My friend,

We are totally in line on Syria

We can do great things on Iran

I do not understand what you are doing on Greenland"

— French president Emmanuel Macron,

The EU, the United Kingdom, Norway, and Canada have united behind Denmark, and condemned the US threats. The European Commission president Ursula von der Leyen said that the EU stands in "full solidarity with Denmark and the people of Greenland" against US threats. EU Defence Commissioner Andrius Kubilius warned that it would be the end of NATO if the US invaded Greenland and said that EU members would be under obligation to come to Denmark's assistance. European countries have united behind Denmark, emphasising that Greenland belongs to its people, not to the United States.

European Council president António Costa said the EU would support Greenland and ‍Denmark when ‍needed and that the EU would not accept violations of international law. European allies said they are working on a plan to support Denmark. EU lawmakers have called for freezing a proposed trade deal with the US.

A joint statement, dated 6 January 2026, by President Emmanuel Macron of France, Chancellor Friedrich Merz of Germany, Prime Minister Giorgia Meloni of Italy, Prime Minister Donald Tusk of Poland, Prime Minister Pedro Sánchez of Spain, Prime Minister Keir Starmer of the United Kingdom and Prime Minister Mette Frederiksen of Denmark emphasised "sovereignty, territorial integrity and the inviolability of borders" and said that "Greenland belongs to its people. It is for Denmark and Greenland, and them only, to decide on matters concerning Denmark and Greenland." A joint statement by foreign ministers of the Nordic countries have echoed the same message. Greenland's prime minister Jens-Frederik Nielsen thanked the European allies for their support.

Ursula von der Leyen said in a speech at the World Economic Forum on 20 January that geopolitical "shocks" and Trump's worldview require a "new form of European independence." She underlined that the sovereignty and integrity of the Kingdom of Denmark including Greenland is non-negotiable. Hungarian Foreign Minister Péter Szijjártó stated that the EU does not need to deal with the Greenland crisis because it is only a dispute between Denmark and the US. There have been claims that Hungary and Prime Minister Viktor Orbán have provided behind the scenes support for Donald Trump's territorial claims concerning Greenland. At the same time, Szijjártó's statement violates several obligations and expectations associated with EU membership, given that Denmark is also a member of the EU.

At the height of the crisis, there also emerged calls and petitions to boycott the 2026 FIFA World Cup, planned for the next summer and co-hosted by the United States.

On 6 February, France and Canada announced the opening of their respective consulates in Nuuk in support of Greenlanders.

== Public opinion ==
In January 2026, Pew Research Center published a poll on American public opinion regarding the Greenland crisis. The results showed that 58% of respondents oppose efforts to take over Greenland, either strongly (45%) or somewhat (13%), while 22% support either strongly (10%) or somewhat (12%), and another 20% were unsure.

In Greenland, a poll from January 2025 showed that public opinion was overwhelmingly against American takeover, with 85% reporting opposition to becoming a part of the United States, while 6% supported and 9% were unsure.

In a YouGov poll in February 2026 among major European countries, a majority of respondents in all countries polled reported unfavourable views of the United States because of the Greenland crisis. At the same time, a majority in all polled countries reported are sceptical that European countries collectively are able to stand up to the United States, and a plurality of respondents in all countries (except Germany) reported their belief that this US foreign policy is temporary and will only last during the Trump presidency.

== Analysis ==
=== Use of hybrid warfare ===
The Trump administration's actions against Greenland and Denmark, initially referred to as the Greenland crisis, have been described by academics and commentators as hybrid warfare, a broad umbrella concept that may include the use of political warfare, fake news, diplomacy, lawfare, regime change, and foreign electoral intervention, among other methods. Greenland was united in condemnation of the US, describing it as "an entirely new and unsettling situation", given that Greenland lacked realistic countermeasures.

Danish media interviewed several experts who said that the US actions against Greenland clearly amount to hybrid warfare. André Ken Jakobsson, a researcher on hybrid warfare, said, already in the spring of 2025, that "the tools the United States uses to achieve its objectives [in Greenland] also fall within the gray zone typically associated with hybrid warfare". Jakobsson believes the United States is now deliberately seeking to fracture the Kingdom of Denmark with the use of intelligence agencies and that the US has been using all of its means short of conventional war in its campaign to try to get Greenland.

Speaking on US hybrid warfare and espionage, DR commentator Niels Fastrup said that the US has shifted from an attempt to buy Greenland in 2019 to hybrid influence operations, conducted by private individuals close to Trump. Swedish foreign affairs commentator and terrorism expert Wolfgang Hansson compared Trump's actions to Russian hybrid warfare, stating that "Trump realised that taking over Greenland militarily would be expensive, risky, and look very bad, but hybrid warfare is cheap and easy to deny".

=== Implications for NATO ===
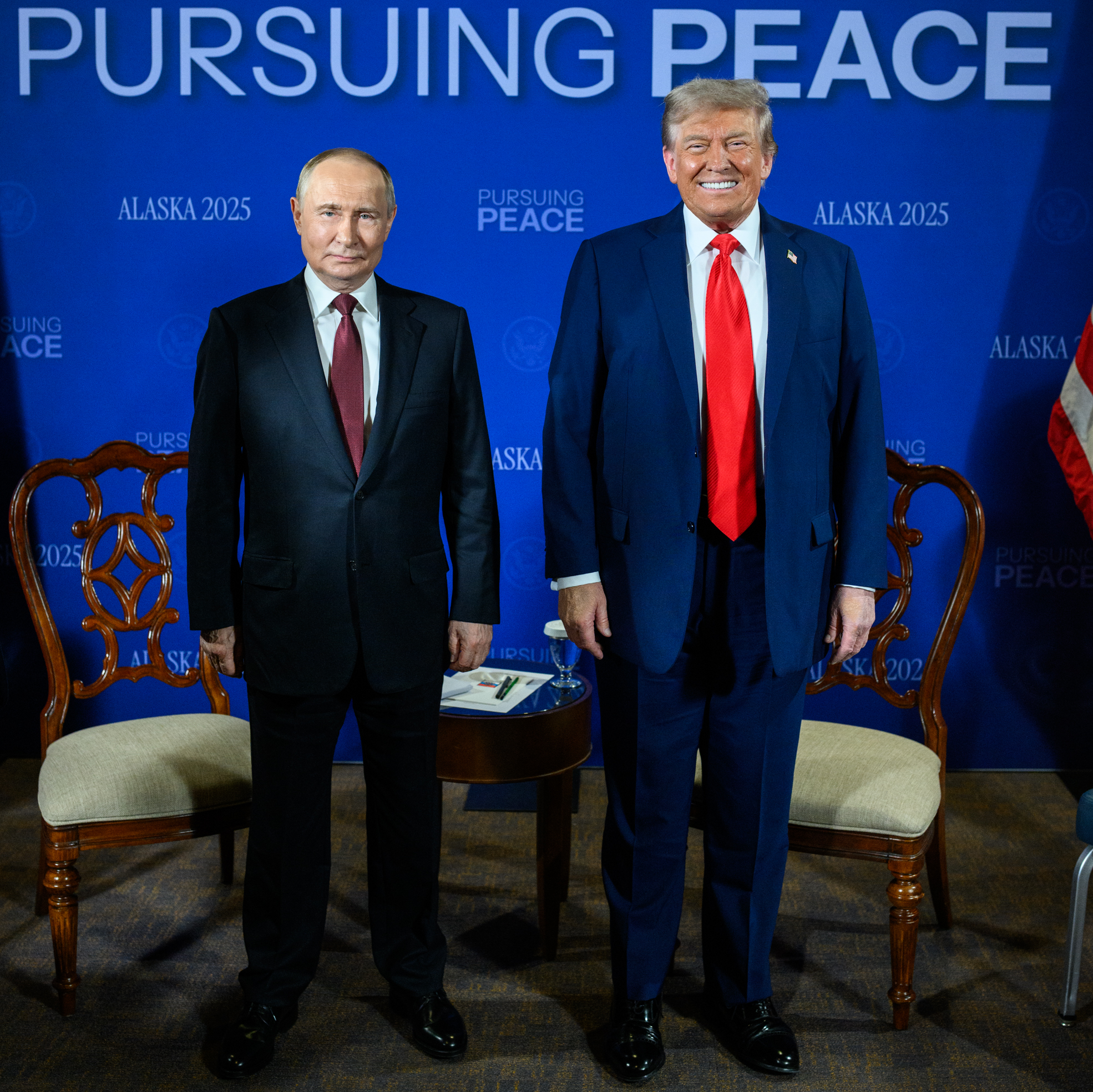
Donald Trump and Vladimir Putin at the 2025 Alaska summit

Trump's threats against Greenland have been described as a new, potentially unprecedented challenge to NATO, given that the US military already has full access to Greenland, Denmark has been a very loyal ally of the US, and has kept Chinese investments and technology out of Greenland. Former head of the NATO Defense College, Arne Bård Dalhaug, said that Trump's threats against Greenland "comes across as a gift-wrapped present from Trump to Putin", allowing him free hands in Eastern Europe. According to international relations scholar Iver B. Neumann, Trump is splitting the West on behalf of the Russians, which has been a key aim of Russian and Soviet foreign policy for years.

Anders Puck Nielsen, a military analyst at the Royal Danish Defence College, and Andrius Kubilius, the EU Commissioner for Defence and Space, agree that, if an American invasion of Greenland were carried out, it would be the end of NATO. Nielsen emphasised that it is now clear Denmark can no longer rely on the US, and that the future lies in a European defence cooperation without US involvement.

Kori Schake said it will take a generation to repair the damage and collapse of trust among the US's closest allies that Trump has caused. Richard N. Haass said Europeans have come to see the US as a threat and no longer trust the US, and that Trump's actions are "turning upside down" what America has worked for over 75 years. In an editorial, The Wall Street Journal said Trump was enabling "the fondest dream of Russian strategy ... to divide Western Europe from the US and break the NATO alliance." European leaders warned that Trump's threats have fundamentally undermined trust in the United States as a security and economic partner, accelerating efforts to reduce reliance on them and to develop independent European defence, security, and political coordination structures.

Christopher S. Chivvis, a senior fellow and director of the American Statecraft Program at the Carnegie Endowment for International Peace, argues that the tariff threat to facilitate a US annexation of Greenland represents a fundamental break with the post-1945 transatlantic order. He contends that by linking trade access to the territorial sovereignty of a NATO ally, the United States would shift from a security guarantor to a form of imperial power. Chivvis describes the demand as a revival of nineteenth-century imperial practices, contrasting it with China's tendency to frame its territorial ambitions as the recovery of historically claimed lands.

David Ignatius argued that Trump's efforts to annex Greenland had triggered a serious crisis that could undermine US security for decades, with potential costs far exceeding any strategic benefits of controlling the island. He characterised the initiative as self-destructive, remarking that it amounted to "shooting yourself in the head." Joshua Yaffa wrote that Trump needlessly caused a crisis in NATO and exacerbated European distrust toward the US only to "end up with basically the same set of options that existed months ago."

=== American expansionism under Trump ===
The escalation of American threats against Greenland has been linked by several commentators to the apparent success of the 2026 United States intervention in Venezuela. Some commentators have also linked the Greenland Crisis to Trump's threats against Canada. Former Premier of Ontario and Permanent Representative of Canada to the United Nations Bob Rae stated that Trump "doesn't take Canada's sovereignty seriously", while former Principal Secretary to the Prime Minister Gerald Butts stated that, although he didn't believe Trump would invade Canada directly, "we're going to see a lot of threats, and we're going to see a lot of seeding of pro-American activity by the Americans in Canadian life". NBC News reported in mid-January 2026 that, according to senior American officials, Trump was "privately ramping up his focus on another target in the Western Hemisphere, increasingly complaining to aides in recent weeks about Canada's vulnerability to US adversaries in the Arctic".

Trump's aggressive negotiation tactics have prompted comparisons with the madman theory. James D. Boys argues that Trump uses the theory, deliberately projecting unpredictability and issuing extreme threats to force concessions, citing Venezuela as an example of where defiance was punished, and warning that no country is immune, adding, "I'd be trying to stay well away from everything that's going on with Greenland and the NATO alliance." An article from South China Morning Post suggested that Trump's interest in controlling Greenland, the Panama Canal, Venezuela, and both Iran and the Strait of Hormuz amid the 2026 Iran war and 2026 Strait of Hormuz crisis connects to a wider pattern of superpower nations attempting to seize control of passages and resources.

=== Use of trolling, disinformation, and far-right rhetoric ===
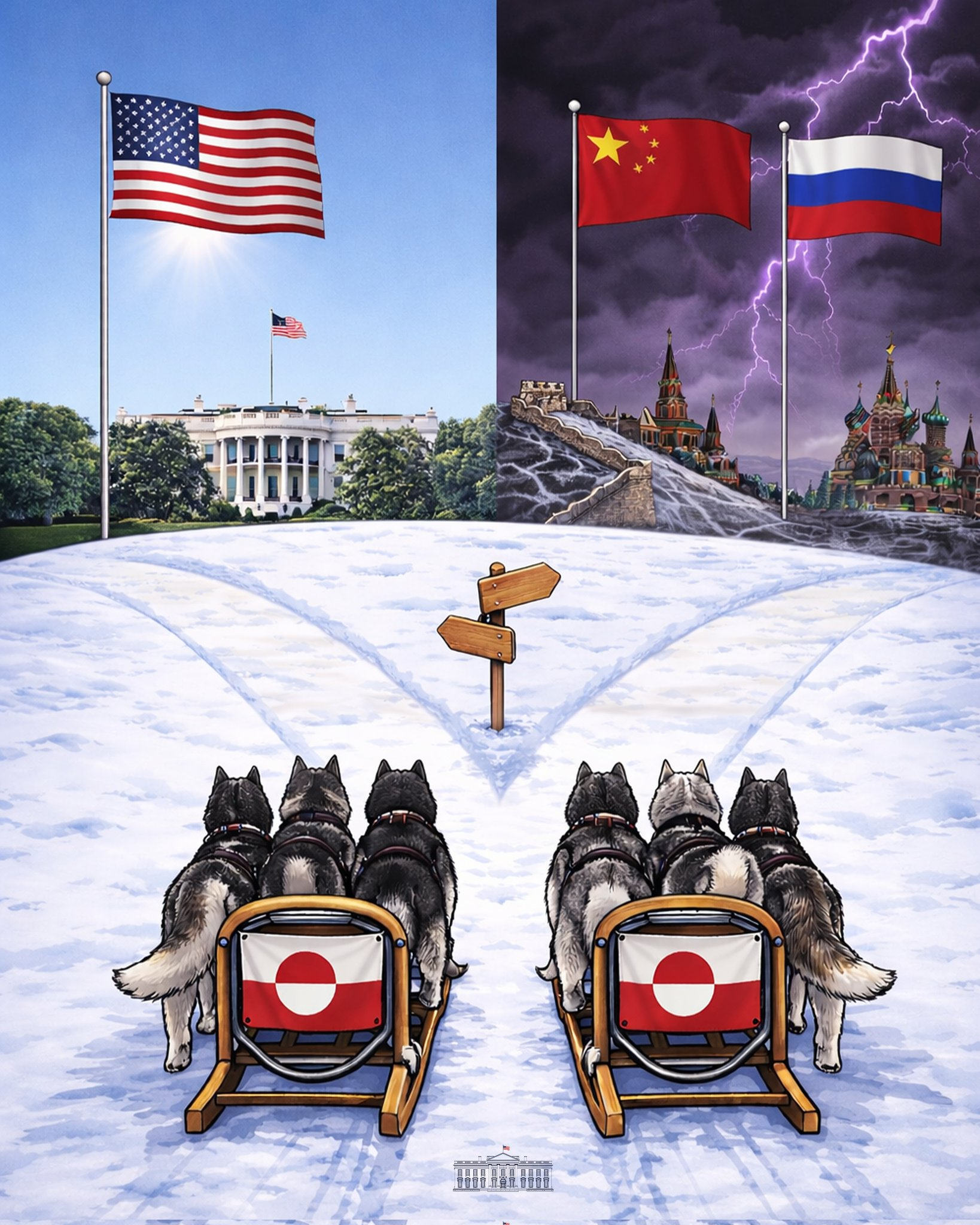
An AI-generated image posted by the White House on 14 January 2026 during the Greenland crisis

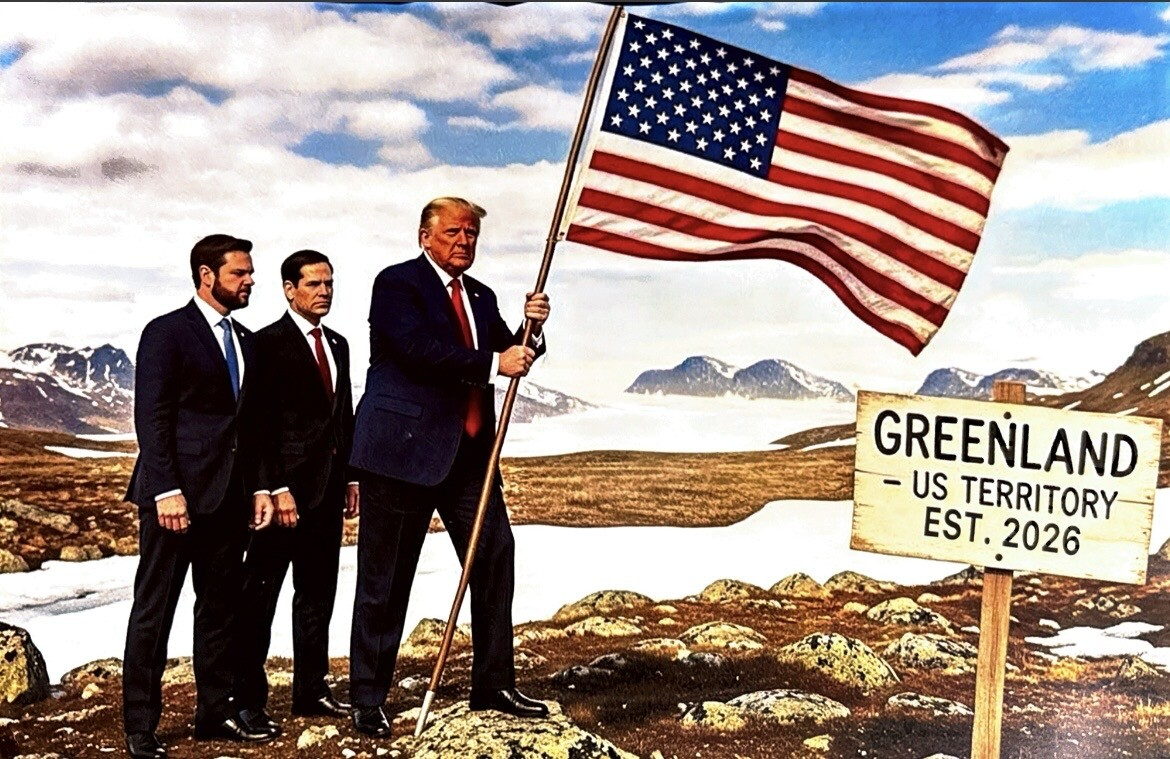
An image posted by Donald J. Trump on his Truth Social account on 20 January 2026 during the Greenland crisis, showing him planting a US flag on Greenlandic soil with JD Vance and Marco Rubio

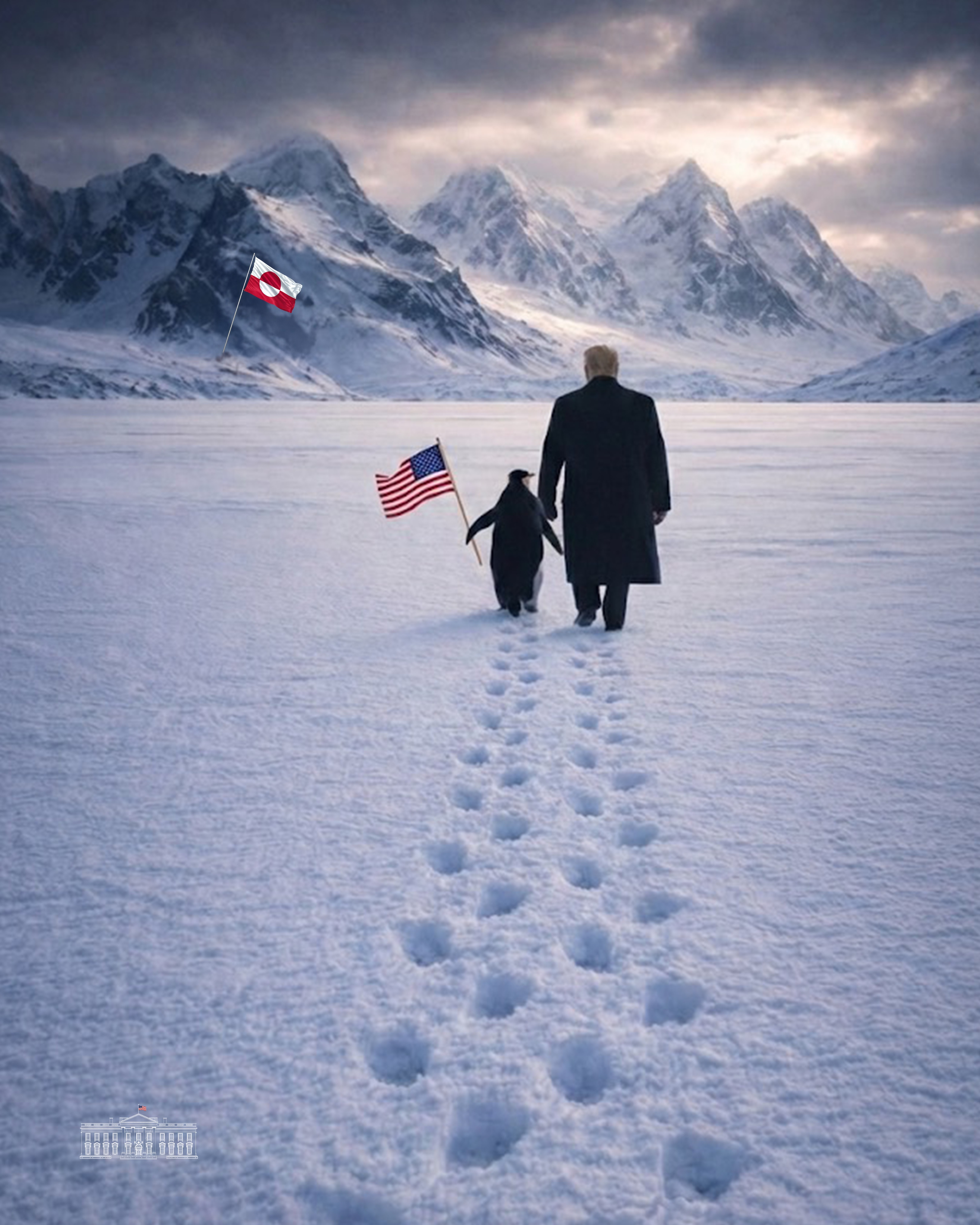
An image posted by the White House on 23 January 2026 during the Greenland crisis, showing Donald Trump walking along with a penguin carrying a US flag with a Greenlandic flag in the background. Penguins live in Antarctica, not in Greenland. The image seems to replicate a viral meme in 2026 known as "nihilistic penguin" taken from a clip of Encounters at the End of the World.

As JD Vance and Marco Rubio met the Danish and Greenlandic foreign ministers Lars Løkke Rasmussen and Vivian Motzfeldt, the White House posted a meme on Twitter with the question: "Which way, Greenland man?" with imagery implying a choice between the United States and an ominous-looking China and Russia. Heidi Beirich of the Global Project Against Hate and Extremism described the meme as reflecting a key concept in neo-Nazi and white supremacist subculture, explaining that "Western man is code for white man, and one of the most popular racist books in these subcultures is Which Way Western Man, which has been featured in a Department of Homeland Security post celebrating manifest destiny."

Trump has engaged in online trolling, posting an altered image that features the US flag covering Canada, Greenland, and Venezuela and an AI image of himself planting a US flag in Greenland, marked as "US territory" and "EST. 2026."

Paul Buvarp, a researcher on disinformation and propaganda at the Norwegian Defence Research Establishment, described Trump's claims about imminent Chinese and Russian threats to Greenland as detached from observable reality and emblematic of information manipulation rather than genuine security analysis. Buvarp argued that the rhetoric functions as propaganda by deliberately creating uncertainty, anxiety, and confusion.

On 29 January 2026, German broadcaster Norddeutscher Rundfunk was fined by Greenlandic police after comic artist Maxi Schafroth attempted to raise the US flag near a cultural centre in Nuuk as part of a stunt. The broadcaster has since apologised and expressed "its regret to the people of Greenland".

=== Attitudes towards the US ===
Trump's threats have been described by Le Monde as turning the Greenlanders decidedly against the US. While Greenland is a longtime ally of the US with a traditionally positive view of the country, the view of the US has become strongly negative as a result of Trump's behaviour.

=== Trade war ===
Political scientist Hilmar Mjelde called Trump's actions a "political own goal of historic proportions", and said he believes Trump has underestimated European steadfastness. Annie Genevard said the EU has strong leverage and can retaliate in a trade war with the US, and that it could be "deadly for the United States", emphasising that Europeans will not let the US do as it pleases.

=== US bases ===
In legal analysis of the crisis, some commentators suggested sovereign bases as a solution, similar to the United Kingdom's retention of sovereign base areas in Cyprus, under which limited territory is held under foreign sovereignty primarily for military purposes. Commentators suggested that such a model could allow a foreign power to exercise sovereign control over specific installations in Greenland without a broader transfer of territory, though the proposal was described as legally complex and politically contentious. Danish MP Sascha Faxe said giving up any sovereignty is completely out of the question, specifically stating that the Cyprus situation is not an option, whilst emphasising that military bases already have a significant degree of operational autonomy and jurisdiction under existing agreements, in line with what is normal for US bases abroad. Both Danish and Greenland officials said sovereignty is not negotiable. On 26 January, Greenland's government said the idea of transferring "sovereignty" of any Greenlandic land, including bases, is not possible and described it as a "red line."

=== Age and mental health of Donald Trump ===
Trump's behaviour drew commentary on his fitness for office. Vin Gupta, a US doctor who works as a medical analyst for NBC News, suggested that Trump's behaviour could be signs of early Alzheimer's or frontotemporal dementia. He said that Trump's letter to Norway "crossed a line of proper adult behavior" and should have had a "more thorough public assessment of his neurological fitness." Trump also repeatedly confused Greenland with Iceland. Democratic lawmakers called for invoking the US 25th Amendment.

=== Mercator projection ===
Analysts noted that Trump's fixation on Greenland was likely fuelled by its appearance on the common Mercator projection of the globe, which greatly exaggerates the island's area relative to other landmasses. In 2021, Trump exclaimed, "I love maps. And I always said, 'Look at the size of this. It's massive, and that should be part of the United States.'"

== Impact ==
=== Domestic ===
The January 2026 escalation was cited by Danish prime minister Mette Frederiksen as a factor behind her decision to call snap elections, stating that "We must define our relationship with the U.S. We must arm ourselves to ensure peace on our continent. We must keep Europe together". Opinion polls indicated that the crisis boosted the popularity of Frederiksen's party, the Social Democrats.

=== Deterioration of Euro-American far-right relations ===
Many far right and nationalist parties in Europe, including Alternative for Germany, National Rally, Sweden Democrats, Brothers of Italy, and Reform UK were described as repulsed by Trump's threats against the sovereignty of a European country. Italian prime minister Giorgia Meloni called Trump's statements "unacceptable" and said, "friendship requires respect." Nigel Farage called Trump's threats against Greenland a "very hostile act" against Europe. According to a YouGov poll from February 2026, the crisis also led to an increase of people in Western Europe with an unfavourable opinion of the United States.

== See also ==
- America shock – Effects of European dependencies on the United States' services
- Arctic policy of the United States
- Arctic resources race – Competition over resources in the Arctic
- Cod Wars – Series of disputes between Iceland and the UK
- Gunboat diplomacy – Pursuit of foreign policy objectives with the aid of conspicuous displays of naval power
- NATO strategy in the Arctic
