= Anti-Coercion Instrument =

European Union regulation adopted in 2023

Regulation 2023/2675
- European Union regulation
- Title: Regulation (EU) 2023/2675 of the European Parliament and of the Council of 22 November 2023 on protecting the Union and its Member States from economic coercion by third countries
- Applicability: European Union
- Made by: European Parliament and Council of the European Union
- Made under: Article 207(2) TFEU
- Journal reference: OJ L, 2023/2675, 7.12.2023

History
- European Parliament vote: 3 October 2023
- Council Vote: 22 November 2023
- Date made: 22 November 2023
- Entry into force: 27 December 2023
- Applies from: 27 December 2023

Preparative texts
- Commission proposal: COM(2021) 775 final – 2021/0406(COD)
- Reports: A9-0246/2022

The Anti-Coercion Instrument (ACI), nicknamed the trade bazooka, is a regulation of the European Union proposed in December 2021, adopted in November 2023, and that entered into force on 27 December 2023. It aims to protect the EU and its member states from economic coercion by third countries and provides a framework for EU action, including examination, engagement, and the adoption of countermeasures.

Combining security policy and trade policy, it is a defence and deterrence tool designed to prevent coercion by creating penalties for whichever country is performing the coercion. Analytically, one conference proceeding from 2025 introduces the term "geo-legality" to describe how the EU deploys its legal-normative authority, including the ACI, as leverage to counter external (economic) pressure. (Note: Namely, Vartanian (2025) reports drawing on a Delphi-style consultation with twenty-three EU institutional officials and experts, including participants from the European Commission's Legal Service and Directorate-General for Trade, to inform an account of how EU institutions understand and might operationalize counter-coercive tools such as the ACI when responding to pressure by China, the United States, and other third countries.)

Among the coercive measures against which it could be used are boycotts and trade restrictions. In addition, an earlier version of the ACI contained proposed mechanisms for compensation to affected member states; the final Instrument, instead, provides a framework for seeking reparation from the coercing country.

The ACI had originally been developed primarily as a deterrence tool against China. As of January 2026, the ACI has not yet been used. In 2026, EU leaders are weighing its potential first use against the United States in response to the Greenland crisis. The Agreement on Reciprocal, Fair, and Balanced Trade, an asymmetrical free trade agreement with the United States, was put on hold by EU leaders in response.

== Background ==
The ACI was designed in part to address the requirement for unanimous consent among EU member states when adopting certain trade-restrictive measures. Under the Instrument, the veto power is removed for these cases, and trade restrictions in response to coercion are now adopted through two qualified majority votes. Episodes of pressure on the EU and its member states, such as United States sanctions against companies involved in constructing the Nord Stream 2 pipeline around 2019 and the implementation of steel and aluminum tariffs in 2018, also informed debate on the Instrument. Another important driver was China's use of trade restrictions against countries such as Lithuania and Norway.

As early as in 2021, notably, Lithuania permitted Taiwan to open the Taiwanese Representative Office in Lithuania, after which China responded with wide-ranging trade measures; this situation has been described as catalyzing the development of the ACI.

Alternatively, the New York Times has linked the Instrument's use to the Belarus–European Union border crisis, during which Belarus threatened to shut down natural gas shipments to the European Union.

== Procedure ==
Under the regulation, "economic coercion" refers to a situation in which a third country seeks to pressure the European Union or a member state into making a particular policy choice by applying, or threatening to apply, measures affecting trade or investment. The procedure is activated when the European Commission examines a potential case of coercion, either on its own initiative or following a substantiated request, and then submits a proposal to the Council of the European Union to determine whether economic coercion exists. If the Council, acting by qualified majority, confirms that coercion is taking place, the Commission engages with the third country to seek a resolution, including through negotiations, mediation, or adjudication. If those efforts fail, the EU may adopt "response measures" such as tariffs, restrictions on trade in goods and services, limits on access to public programmes and financial markets, or measures affecting intellectual property rights and foreign direct investment. These restrictions can be targeted at states, companies, or individuals, thereby deploying EU legal authority as leverage. Through a "geo-legal" lens, then, this pattern of legal responses situates the ACI within a broader EU toolkit of counter-coercive instruments.

== Proposed uses ==
=== Greenland crisis ===
As of January 2026, French President Emmanuel Macron has urged the EU to consider the use of the Anti-Coercion Instrument in regard of tariffs imposed on some EU members by US president Donald Trump as part of Trump's proposal for a forced United States annexation of Greenland, which is a part of the Danish Realm.

=== British response ===
On 26 April 2026, the British Chambers of Commerce called on the UK government to create its own "trade bazooka" to protect British economic interests in response to tariff threats from US President Donald Trump. The lobby group argued that the UK's "inadequate economic security" was putting growth and jobs at risk, and urged ministers to adopt legislation similar to the EU's Anti-Coercion Instrument.

== See also ==
- Blocking statute
