= Vin Gupta (pulmonologist) =

American pulmonologist

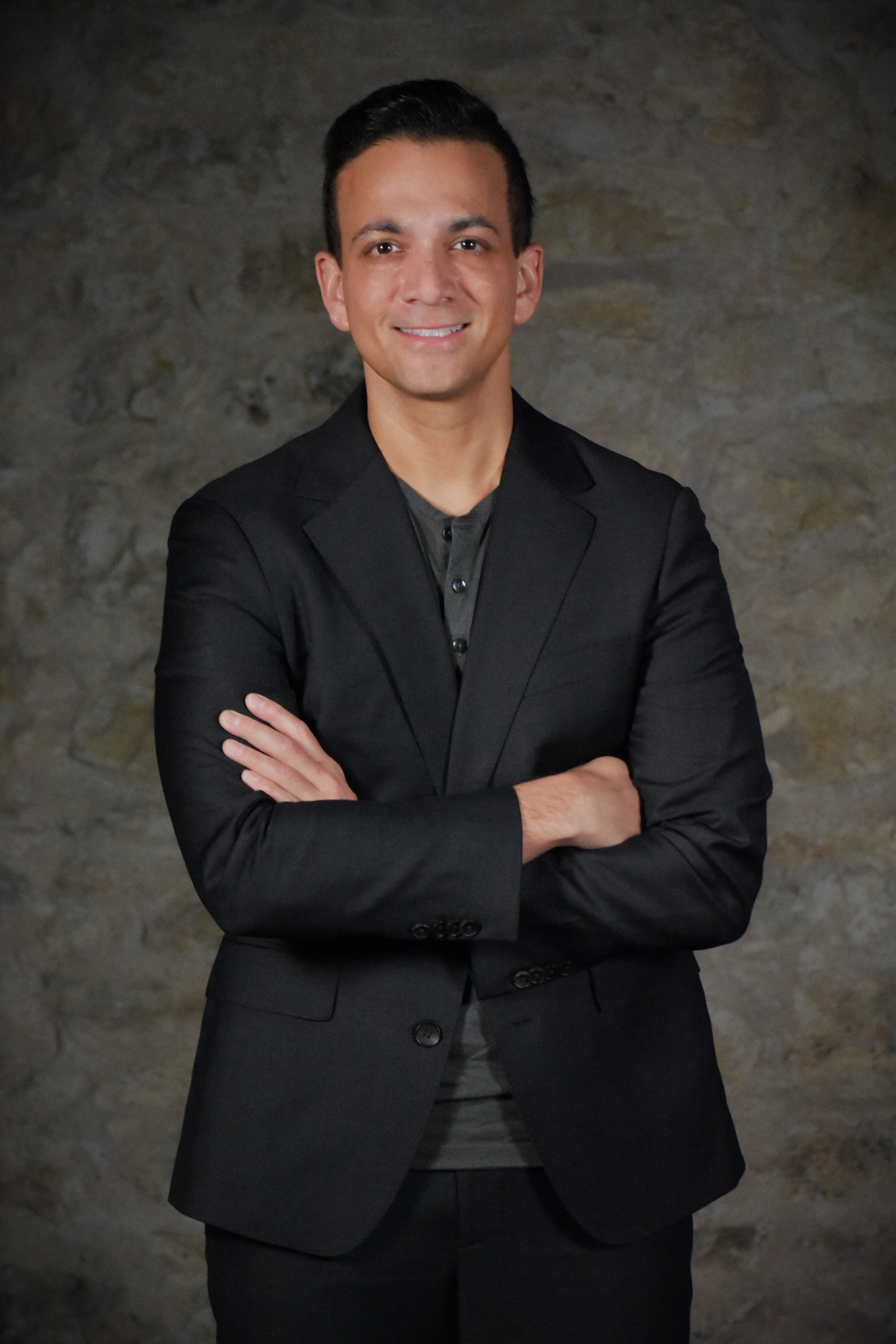
- Education: Princeton University (BA); Columbia University College of Physicians and Surgeons (MD); University of Cambridge (MS); Harvard Kennedy School (MPA)
- Occupation: Pulmonologist
- Years active: 2011–present
- Employers: Manatt; Institute for Health Metrics and Evaluation; Virginia Mason Medical Center; United States Air Force Medical Service Reserves; Amazon
- Board member of: Center for Environmental Health; Northwest Harvest
- Military career
- Rank: Major
- Unit: United States Air Force Medical Reserve Corps

Vin Gupta is an American public health physician and pulmonologist who is a prominent medical analyst for MS NOW (formerly MSNBC). In November 2026, MS NoW announced the launch of Gupta's own healthcare franchise, "On Call with Dr. Vin Gupta." He is also a Managing Director of Health Innovation at Manatt, Phelps and Phillips, LLP and was formerly a Chief Medical Officer at Amazon. He continues to serve as a Distinguished Scholar with the University of Washington's Evans School of Public Policy and Governance, attending physician at Virginia Mason Medical Center, and lead officer of the Critical Care Air Transport Team for the United States Air Force Medical Service Reserves, based at Joint Base Lewis–McChord.

== Career ==
=== Education and medical career ===
Gupta attended Princeton University, where he received a Bachelor of Arts degree in 2005. He received his Doctor of Medicine degree from the Columbia University Vagelos College of Physicians and Surgeons in 2011, and completed his residency in internal medicine at University of Washington.

He did a fellowship in Pulmonary & Critical Care Medicine at Brigham and Women's Hospital in Boston from 2014 to 2017. As part of the United States Air Force Medical Service Reserves, he completed commissioned officer training in 2015. He also received his Master of Studies in International Relations from the University of Cambridge in 2015, and a Master of Public Administration from Harvard Kennedy School at Harvard in 2017.

In 2018, Gupta moved back to the Seattle area to work with the University of Washington Medical Center and the Swedish Medical Center. In January 2020, Gupta joined Amazon where he later was the company's chief medical officer across a range of efforts, including the lead for COVID-19 response and later their Devices and Services group as well as Amazon Health. Also in 2020, he left Swedish Medical and joined the Virginia Mason Medical Center; he remains an affiliate faculty member at the Institute for Health Metrics and Evaluation and Evans School; both organizations are part of the University of Washington in Seattle.

=== Media analyst work ===
Since 2020, Gupta has worked as a high-profile medical analyst for NBC media, as an NBC News and MSNBC medical contributor on issues related to the COVID-19 pandemic and other public health issues. According to The Seattle Times, he made "hundreds" of appearances in 2020 alone to provide medical guidance to the public. Prior to the pandemic, Gupta has spoken and written on a range of public health issues, including climate change, vaping, and gun violence.

=== Political speculation ===
In July 2022, Politico first reported that Gupta was the leading candidate for a top role within the Biden administration, specifically as Principal Medical Advisor to the US Food and Drug Administration. In this role, Gupta would have been "charged primarily with improving the FDA's image and boosting public trust in the agency as a public health authority." It was later reported he declined the position due to family considerations. This follows prior speculation that Gupta was short-listed for United States Surgeon General by President Biden shortly after the latter's election in 2020, amid other reporting that he was under consideration, given his skills as a "gifted" communicator.

In October 2026, Gupta was named to the Public Health for America Working Group, one of five members, by Senator Patty Murray. The mission of the Working Group will be to develop a legislative "blueprint to build America's public health system stronger, more resilient and insulated from political interference."

=== Other ventures and honors ===
Gupta has delivered several major healthcare keynotes, including at South by Southwest as a featured speaker in 2024, where he discussed how the myriad ways technology is impacting the delivery of care to patients across the United States; as a recurring moderator at Aspen Ideas Health Festival; and as a headliner for major events. In January 2026, Gupta was announced as the recipient of the Senator Frank R. Lautenberg Award Recipient by the Rutgers University School of Public Health, given in recognition of his "extraordinary" contributions to the field. He will also serve as the school's 40th commencement speaker during its May 2026 ceremony. Gupta was also tapped as the 2026 commencement speaker for the Kaiser Permanente Bernard J Tyson School of Medicine, citing his role as a national public health leader, and was named as one of America's most influential healthcare leaders in 2026.

Gupta is on the board of directors of the American Lung Association, Center for Environmental Health and Climate Solutions. He is also a life Member of the Council on Foreign Relations.

== Awards and honors ==
- America's Most Influential Healthcare Leaders of 2026, The Industry Leaders, 2026
- Senator Frank R. Lautenberg Award in Public Health, Rutgers School of Public Health, 2026
- Gold Medal - Video Series, Academy of Digital and Interactive Arts, 2025
- Hero in Healthcare, VNA Care, 2024
- Hero of the Deep, Seattle Kraken, 2023
- Most Influential People, Seattle Magazine, 2021
- Science Awareness Award: Communicating complex science topics in innovative, engaging ways, Novim, 2021
- 40 under 40 Leaders in Health Award: National Minority Quality Forum, 2017
