= American expansionism under Donald Trump =

An AI-generated image shared by Donald Trump on Truth Social depicting the United States' closest geographic neighbors under U.S. control, covered in the pattern of the U.S. flag.

Throughout both of his presidencies, U.S. president Donald Trump has expressed a desire to expand the United States' territory and influence through both land purchases and military means. Trump first stated his desire to annex Greenland during his first presidency; he has pursued a campaign to acquire Greenland during his second presidency. He has also suggested annexation or taking control of Canada, Iceland, Mexico, Cuba, the Panama Canal and Gaza Strip. After proposing an invasion of Venezuela during his first presidency, Trump's second administration removed President Nicolás Maduro as part of Operation Absolute Resolve and stated the U.S. would "run" Venezuela; the Venezuelan government, led by acting president Delcy Rodríguez, remains in place but is far more amicable to American interests than it was under Maduro. Threats were also made against Colombia and then-president Gustavo Petro, whom Trump accused of drug trafficking. Amid the 2026 Iran war, Trump has commented about invading and seizing control of both the Strait of Hormuz and Kharg Island from Iran.

Asked: Are there limits on your global power?

Yeah, there is one thing. My own morality. My own mind. It's the only thing that can stop me. I don't need international law. I'm not looking to hurt people.

— Donald Trump, January 7, 2026

New York Times White House correspondents wrote that "Mr. Trump's assessment... was the most blunt acknowledgment yet of his worldview. At its core is the concept that national strength, rather than laws, treaties and conventions, should be the deciding factor as powers collide."

Trump's determination to treat the Western Hemisphere as a U.S. sphere of influence has been characterized as a revival of the Monroe Doctrine in what has become known as the Donroe Doctrine. On his orders, U.S. federal agencies adopted new names for shared international waters, renaming the Gulf of Mexico as "Gulf of America" in 2025 and Lake Ontario as "Lake America" in 2026. Deputy Chief of Staff Stephen Miller and Secretary of State Marco Rubio defended the second Trump administration's foreign policy as a matter of operating as a superpower nation and for national security purposes. Numerous politicians outside the U.S. have criticized Trump's annexation comments. The Democratic Party has introduced bills to prevent the Trump administration from invading countries without the approval of Congress.

== Background ==
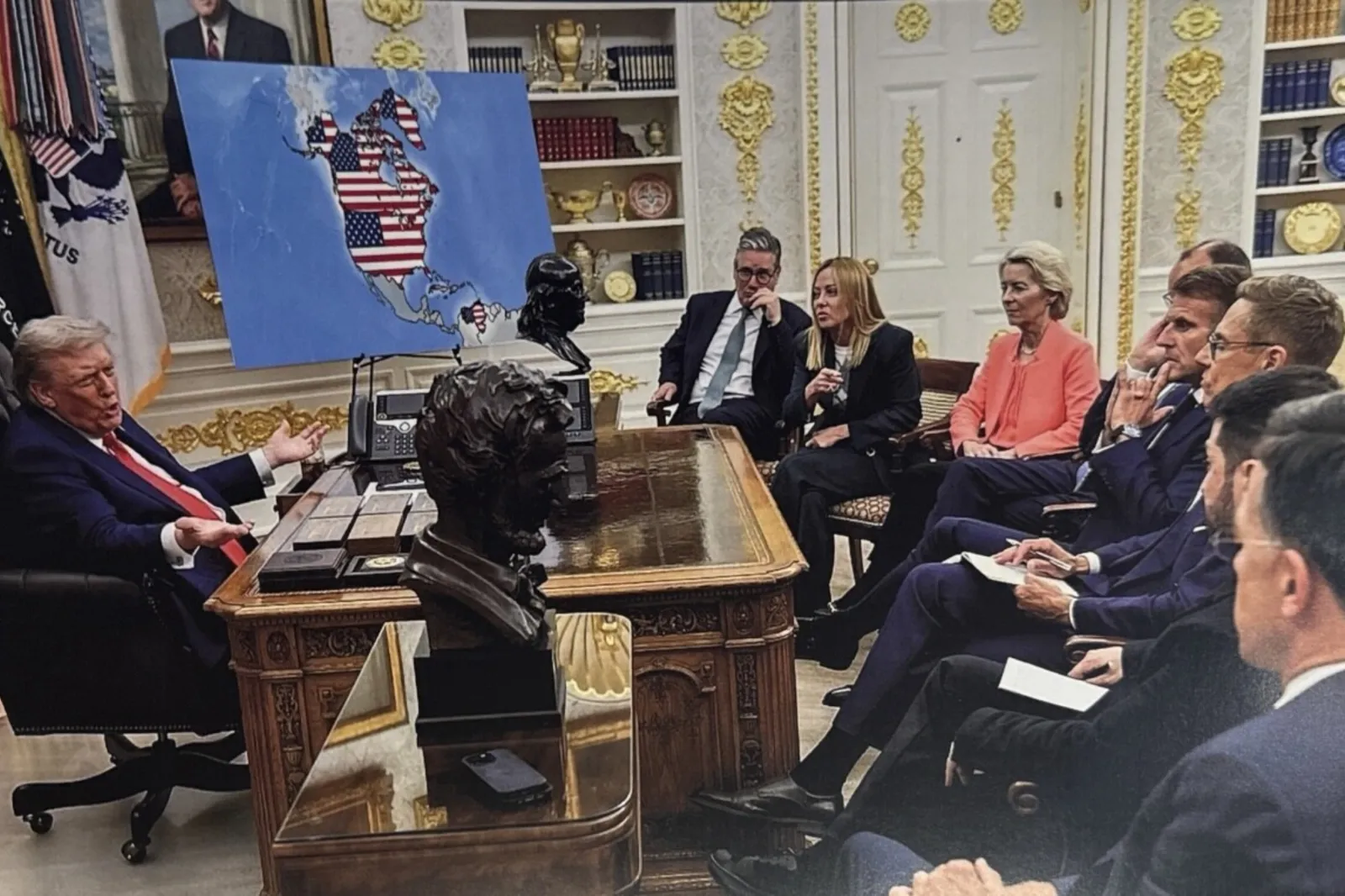
AI-generated Truth Social image of European leaders meeting with Donald Trump featuring Greenland, Canada, Cuba, and Venezuela covered with the U.S. flag posted by Trump, 20 January 2026

The last territory acquired by the United States came in 1947 with the acquisition of the Northern Mariana Islands, Caroline, and Marshall Islands. Of these islands, only the Northern Mariana Islands would become a U.S. territory, with the others becoming independent in the 1980s and 1990s under Compacts of Free Association.

During both of his presidencies, U.S. president Donald Trump expressed a desire to expand the United States' territory through both land purchases and military means. Multiple authors have observed that Trump's imperialist and expansionist mentalities had intensified in 2026 as proven by patterns of increased aggression against multiple countries.

Trump's determination to treat the Western Hemisphere as a U.S. sphere of influence has been characterized as a revival of the Monroe Doctrine. The 2025 National Security Strategy announced the "Trump Corollary" to the Monroe Doctrine, also known as the Donroe Doctrine. Secretary of State Marco Rubio claimed that the European Union has no right to define how the United States can operate its national security and that Trump is responding to defend their country. Deputy Chief of Staff Stephen Miller explained the administration's foreign policy by invoking the country's position as a superpower: "We're a superpower. And under President Trump, we are going to conduct ourselves as a superpower." According to a February 2025 poll by YouGov, only 4% of Americans support American expansion if it requires force, 33% of Americans support expansion without the use of force, and 48% of Americans oppose expansion altogether.

== North America ==
On September 7, 2026, President Trump posted a map with an American flag covering all of North America, as well as Iceland and islands in the Caribbean.

=== Canada ===
Upon retaking office in January 2025, President Trump began tying his agenda of trade tariffs to the U.S. annexation of Canada. Two separate crises, one of fentanyl smuggling, and one of migrant flows from Canada, were key U.S. grievances. In fact, Ontario noted a substantial increase of illicit narcotics moving from the U.S. into Canada.

This form of economic coercion started a Buy Canadian movement in Central Canada and tourism boycott of the U.S. in Eastern Canada. Ex-prime minister Justin Trudeau and some political figures on the ideological spectrum were in opposition to tariffs. Trudeau resigned as PM shortly afterwards, to be replaced by former central bank governor Mark Carney. Since then, President Trump has repeatedly reiterated his call for Canada to join the United States as "a state" with negligible uptake in Central Canada. These "51st state" calls have formed a backdrop against the ongoing Canada–U.S. trade dispute. Calls to rename Lake Ontario into "Lake America" were also floated by the president in August 2026; on August 27, he signed an executive order renaming the lake in the U.S. Geographic Names Information System.

=== Greenland ===
==== Proposed acquisition ====
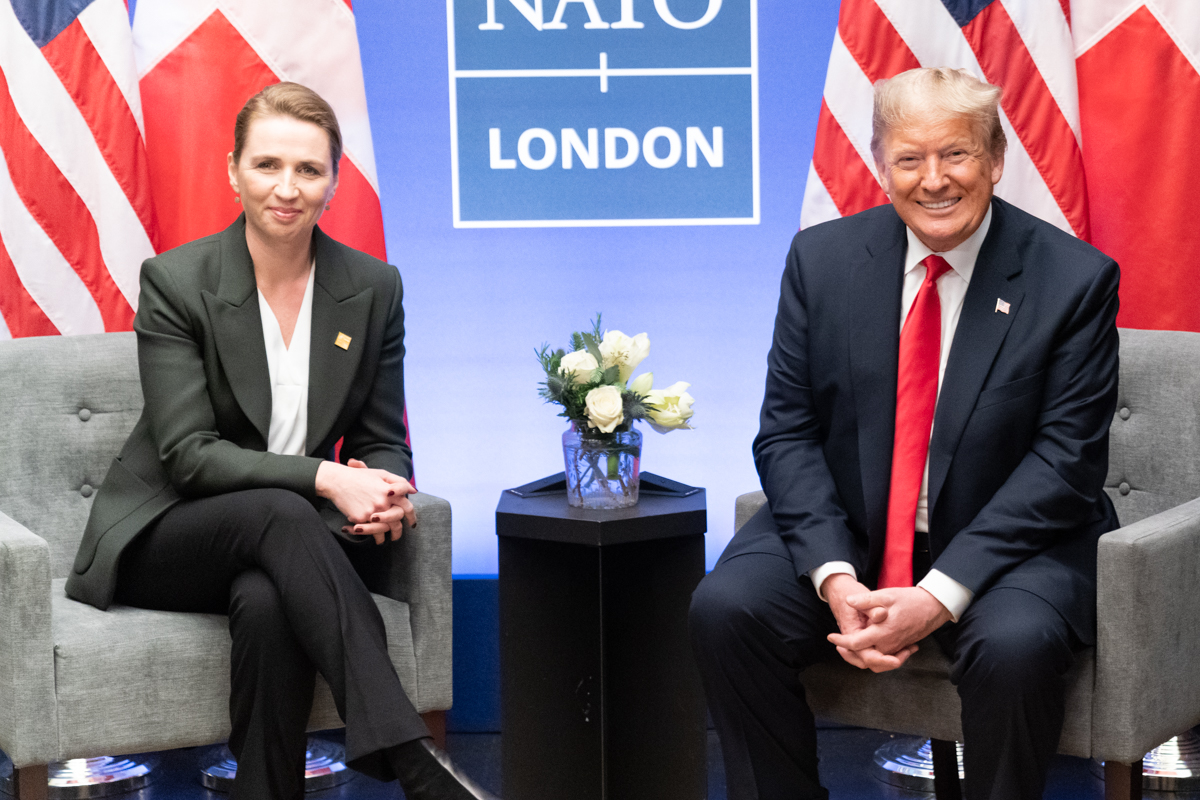
Trump with Danish prime minister Mette Frederiksen in 2019

Trump first stated his desire to annex Greenland in 2019, during his first presidency. In his second presidency, Trump has pursued a campaign to acquire Greenland. In December 2024, Trump stated a further proposal for the United States to purchase Greenland from Denmark, describing ownership and control of the island as "an absolute necessity" for national security purposes. This builds upon a prior offer from Trump to buy Greenland during his first term, which the Danish Realm refused, causing him to cancel his August 2019 visit to Denmark. On January 7, 2025, Trump's son Donald Trump Jr. visited Greenland's capital city Nuuk alongside Charlie Kirk to hand out MAGA hats. At a press conference the following day, Trump refused to rule out military or economic force in order to take over Greenland or the Panama Canal. However, he did rule out military force in taking over Canada. On January 12, then-Vice President-elect JD Vance repeatedly stated that controlling Greenland is critical for U.S. national security and said there's "a deal to be made in Greenland". Asked on January 14 by Senator Mazie Hirono about the potential use of military force to integrate Greenland into the United States, Pete Hegseth stated he would not provide details in a public forum. On January 14, the Trump-affiliated Nelk Boys also visited Nuuk, handing out dollar bills to locals.

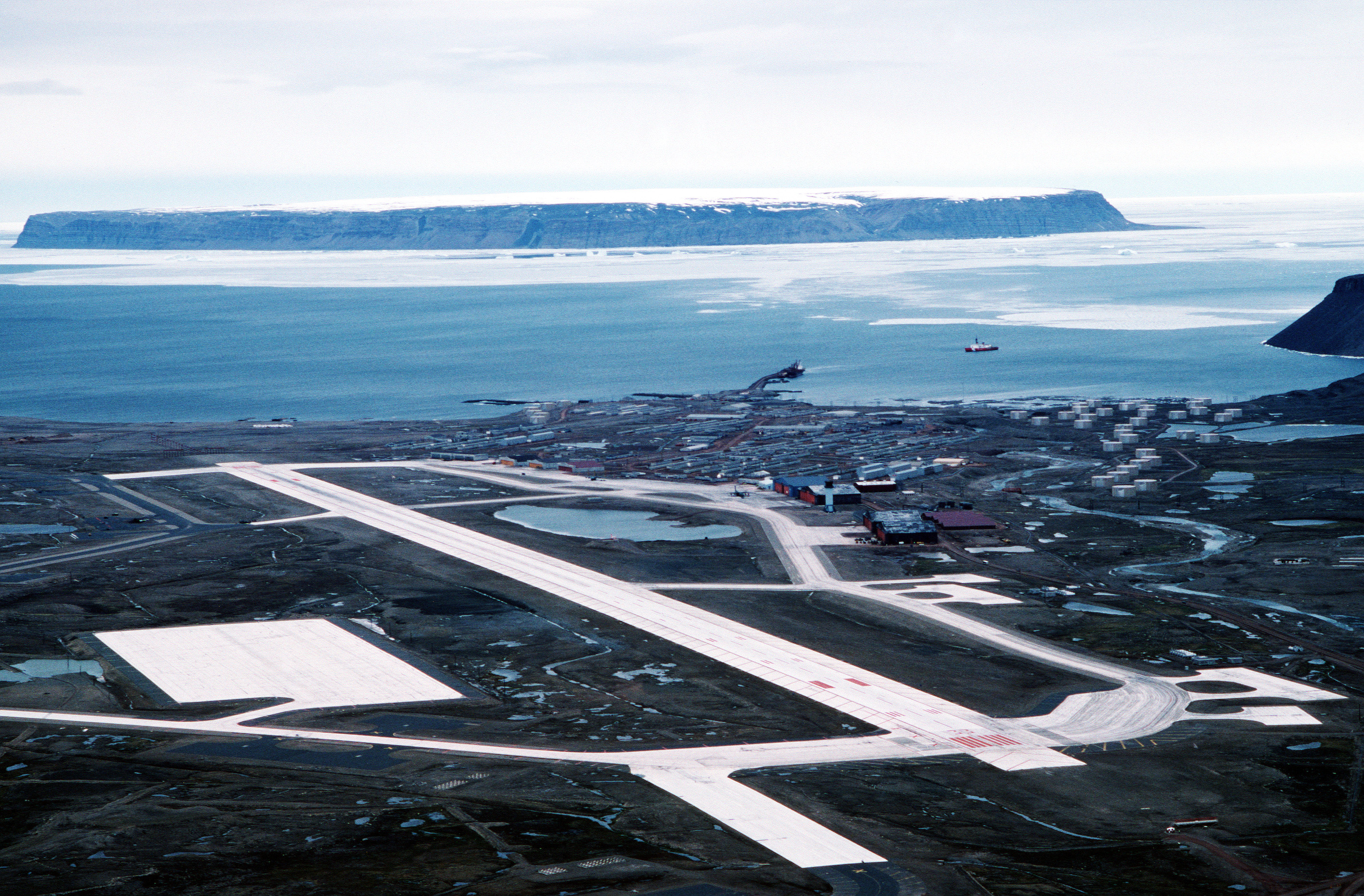
Pituffik Space Base, the U.S.-run ballistic missile-warning site in Greenland

On January 16, the CEOs of major Danish companies Novo Nordisk, Vestas and Carlsberg among others were assembled for a crisis meeting in the Ministry of State to discuss the situation. On the subsequent day, former chief executive Friis Arne Petersen in the Danish Ministry of Foreign Affairs described the situation as "historically unheard of", while Noa Redington, special adviser to former prime minister Helle Thorning-Schmidt, compared the international pressure on Denmark to that during the 2005 Jyllands-Posten Muhammad cartoons controversy. Political commentator Henrik Qvortrup stated on the 17th that a mention of Greenland during Trump's inaugural address on January 20 would confirm Trump's seriousness, making the situation one of Denmark's largest international crises since World War II.

On February 6, 2025, a poll conducted by USA Today between January 7, 2025, and January 10, 2025, was released which showed that only 11% of Americans said that Trump should purchase or annex Greenland. 29% of Americans said that they thought that acquiring Greenland was a good but unrealistic idea, and 53% of Americans said that they don't support the idea of annexing Greenland. On May 4, 2025, during an interview on NBC's Meet the Press, when asked about the potential use of military force to annex Greenland, Trump replied, "I don't rule it out. I don't say I'm going to do it, but I don't rule out anything. No, not there. We need Greenland very badly. Greenland is a very small amount of people, which we'll take care of, and we'll cherish them, and all of that. But we need that for international security."

In January 2026, Trump expressed renewed interest in annexing Greenland, refusing to rule out military force and threatening tariffs on participating countries of Operation Arctic Endurance, A January 2026 Quinnipiac poll, found that 86% of American respondents opposed using military force to take over Greenland, and 55% opposed buying it.

===== Make Greenland Great Again Act =====
On January 13, 2025, legislation was introduced in the U.S. House of Representatives by Rep. Andy Ogles to authorize the United States Government to acquire Greenland on behalf of the U.S., granting to Congress a 60-day review period prior to integration of Greenlandic territory into the United States. As of the date of introduction, the bill had 12 co-sponsors and had been referred to the United States House Committee on Foreign Affairs for review. On January 26, 2025, former Minister for Greenland Tom Høyem stated that the 1917 agreement with the United Kingdom still stood, giving them the right of first refusal in the event of any sale of the islands.

===== Red, White, and Blueland Act of 2025 =====
On February 10, 2025, Republican representative Buddy Carter introduced legislation which would rename Greenland to "Red, White, and Blue land" and allow U.S. president Donald Trump to "purchase or otherwise acquire" Greenland. Carter further stated, "When our Negotiator-in-Chief signs this historic agreement, we will proudly welcome the people of what is now Greenland to join the freest nation in history. President Trump has identified this purchase as a national security priority." The legislation gives the office of the Secretary of the Interior six months after its passage to ensure that federal documents are updated to reflect the name change.

==== Espionage ====
In early May 2025, the Danish government summoned the United States Ambassador to Denmark in response to a Wall Street Journal report that officials working for Director of National Intelligence Tulsi Gabbard had instructed the heads of the Central Intelligence Agency, National Security Agency and Defense Intelligence Agency to collect intelligence on Greenlandic independence movement and the attitudes toward American resource extraction efforts in the territory. In late August 2025, the Danish government again summoned the U.S. ambassador after at least three American citizens, allegedly with ties to Trump, were reported attempting covert operations to foment secessionism. DR reported that one American was attempting to gather a list of Greenlanders to recruit for a secessionist movement.

=== Iceland ===
In November 2024, Trump called Icelandic Prime Minister Bjarni Benediktsson and made comments about Iceland becoming the 51st state; this was not publicly revealed until September 2026.

In January 2026, then upcoming U.S. ambassador to Iceland Billy Long made a joke about converting Iceland into the 52nd state before apologizing for the joke following backlash. Later the same month at the 56th World Economic Forum at Davos, Switzerland, Trump repeatedly confused Greenland with Iceland in his speech that touched upon the Greenland crisis and how Iceland "costed" the U.S. stock market a "lot of money".

A map showcasing Iceland as part of the United States prompted Icelandic Foreign Minister Þorgerður Katrín Gunnarsdóttir to summon its U.S. ambassador. Þorgerður Katrín added in a separate comment that "There's nothing funny or normal about making fun of the sovereignty of states, especially today when it's not a given".

== Latin America ==
Trump alongside Argentine President Milei, Salvadoran President Bukele, Chilean President Kast and other leaders at the Shield of the Americas summit in Florida, March 2026

=== Colombia ===
In January 2026, following the 2026 United States intervention in Venezuela that captured Venezuelan president Nicolás Maduro, Trump made several comments about Colombian president Gustavo Petro, accusing him of facilitating or taking part in cocaine trafficking into the United States. Trump said during a interview that "Columbia is very sick too, run by a sick man who likes making cocaine and selling it to the United States. And he's not going to be doing it very long, let me tell you". Asked by a reporter if there would be a military operation against Colombia similar to the one in Venezuela, Trump responded "It sounds good to me".

=== Cuba ===
During the 2026 Cuban crisis and American blockade of the island, Trump stated, "I do believe I will have the honor of taking Cuba." When questioned by a journalist, Trump clarified "in some form," then going on to say, "whether I free it, take it, I think I can do anything I want with it." The following day Trump stated, "we will be doing something with Cuba very soon." Trump's Secretary of State Marco Rubio is a Cuban-American and has called for new leadership on the island.

=== Mexico ===
Trump has alleged that the United States is subsidizing Mexico and that this suggests that Mexico should become a state. In an interview with NBC, Trump said, "We're subsidizing Mexico for almost $300 billion. We shouldn't be — why are we subsidizing these countries? If we're going to subsidize them, let them become a state." Trump also proposed renaming the Gulf of Mexico to the "Gulf of America". Trump first proposed the idea in a news conference, and he mentioned it in his inaugural address. Upon taking office on January 20, Trump signed an executive order renaming the portion of the gulf from the U.S. shoreline to "the seaward boundary with Mexico and Cuba" as the "Gulf of America" in federal usage.

=== Panama ===
==== Panama Canal ====
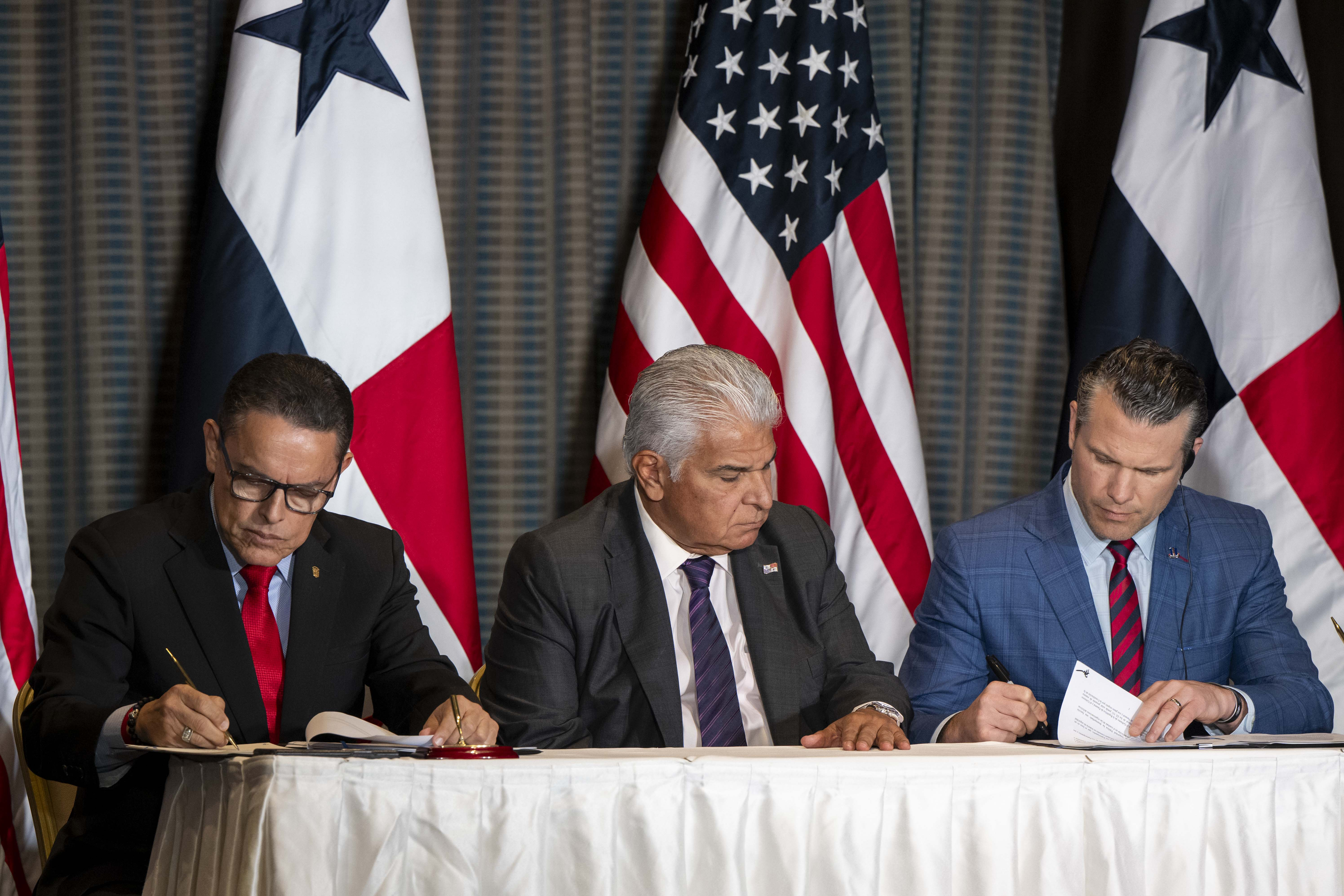
Signing of the joint deal between United States and Panama (April 9, 2025)

In December 2024, Trump demanded that Panama return control of the Panama Canal to the United States due to 'excessive rates' being charged for American passage. If the United States were to take control of the Panama Canal, it would mark the first time the United States controlled Panamanian territory since the 1989 United States invasion of Panama. On January 7, 2025, Trump stated that he had not ruled out the use of military to take control of the Panama Canal. The next day on January 8, 2025, Deputy Pentagon Press Secretary Sabrina Singh declined to answer a reporter's question regarding the potential use of military force to annex the Panama Canal. On January 14, 2025, presumptive nominee for the United States Secretary of Defense Pete Hegseth declined to answer a question by Senator Mazie Hirono about the potential use of military force to take the Panama Canal and Greenland and if he would comply with an order to do so.

In his first official trip abroad, Secretary of State Marco Rubio traveled to Panama to push to reclaim the Panama Canal for the United States. On January 28, 2025, the United States Senate held a hearing on the Panama Canal. During the hearing, a bipartisan group of senators claimed China maintains influence over the Panama Canal, with Democratic Senator Maria Cantwell saying: "I am concerned about the Chinese-owned ports in Panama and their proximity to the Canal." The Hong Kong-based company manages two of the canal's five ports, and CCP General Secretary Xi Jinping integrated the canal into his Belt and Road Initiative.

On February 2, 2025, President Trump told reporters that he vowed to "take back" the Panama Canal and warned of a "powerful" U.S. action saying, "China is running the Panama Canal that was not given to China, that was given to Panama foolishly, but they violated the agreement, and we're going to take it back, or something very powerful is going to happen". On March 5, 2025, the American investment company BlackRock announced that a consortium, including also Global Infrastructure Partners and Terminal Investment Limited, would buy CK Hutchison's 80% holding in Hutchison Port Holdings, which owns ports at either end of the canal. According to the New York Times, the Hong Kong-based Li family felt "under political pressure to exit the ports business"; discussions with BlackRock about the Panama Canal had begun only a few weeks prior, coinciding with the beginning of the Trump administration.

Trump told Congress in March 2025 that his "administration will be reclaiming the Panama Canal." Also that month, Defense Secretary Pete Hegseth instructed the Trump administration to "immediately" present "credible military options to ensure fair and unfettered U.S. military and commercial access to the Panama Canal".

===== Panama Canal Repurchase Act =====
On January 9, 2025, legislation was introduced in the U.S. House of Representatives by Rep. Dusty Johnson to authorize the United States Government to acquire the Panama Canal zone on behalf of the U.S. As of the date of introduction, the bill had 16 co-sponsors and had been referred to the United States House Committee on Foreign Affairs for review.

==== Joint security deal ====
On April 9, 2025, during a visit to Panama, United States Secretary of Defense Pete Hegseth suggested that the United States could "revive" military bases or naval air stations in Panama by stationing American soldiers in them. The next day, a joint deal was signed between the United States and Panama, which would allow American troops to be deployed to Panama as long as the Panamanian government agrees to the deployments.

On August 12, 2026, Defense Secretary Hegseth would visit Panama as part of a summit for the Shield of the Americas initiative created by Donald Trump. As part of this summit in Panama City, Panama, Hegseth would praise Panama, calling it a "Role Model for other countries to follow". Following the summit, Hegseth would visit The Jungle School at Fort Sherman and would be interviewed by multiple media outlets. In this interview, he called the reactivation of Fort Sherman a success and, when asked if the US would reactivate even more military facilities in Panama, called the Jungle School "Home" and mentioned that it will be used as part of the MoU and Shield of the Americas to train both American personnel as well as personnel from surrounding countries such as Colombia.

=== Venezuela ===
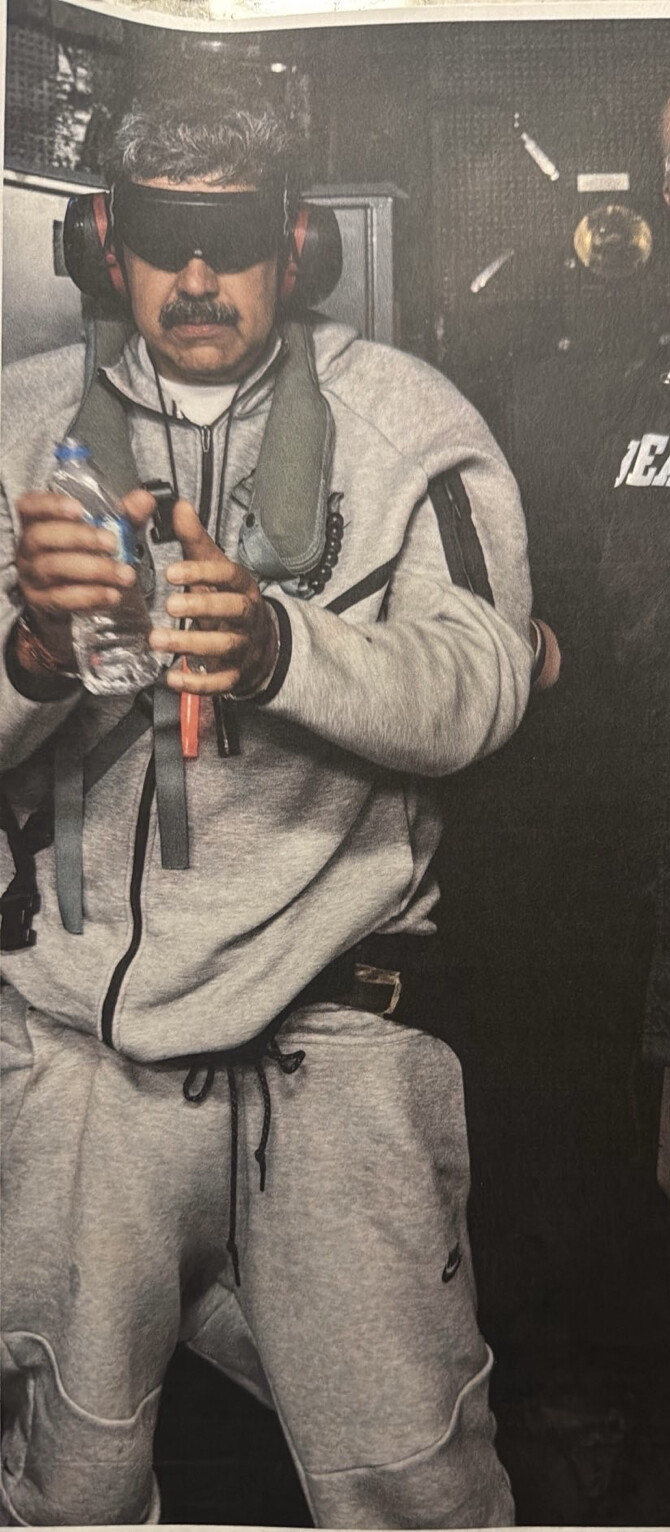
Nicolás Maduro aboard USS Iwo Jima following his abduction

While campaigning in North Carolina in June 2023, Trump told reporters, "When I left, Venezuela was ready to collapse. We would have taken it over, we would have gotten all that oil." Secretary of State Marco Rubio said that "all options should remain on the table" to remove Venezuelan President Nicolás Maduro from power and restore democracy in Venezuela. Axios reported that President Donald Trump and his team wanted a regime change in Venezuela to go in a similar fashion to the fall of the Assad regime. Puerto Rican governor Jenniffer González-Colón said in a letter to U.S. president Donald Trump that Maduro "is an open threat to the United States, our national security and stability in the region".

On April 27, 2025, the Trump administration began designating a Venezuelan gang known as the Tren de Aragua as a Venezuelan state-sponsored international terrorist organization. When asked about the possibility of removing Maduro from power, Trump responded, "We'll see what happens". On August 7, 2025, Attorney General Pam Bondi announced a $50 million reward for information leading to the arrest of Maduro, calling him one of the "world's most notorious narco-traffickers" and a "threat to national security." On August 18, 2025, the U.S. deployed three warships and approximately 4,000 sailors and Marines to the coast of Venezuela, citing the need to combat drug cartels. On September 2, 2025, the U.S. Navy began carrying out airstrikes against Venezuelan vessels in the Southern Caribbean, alleging they were being operated by Tren de Aragua.

After proposing invasion of Venezuela, Trump's second administration abducted President Nicolás Maduro as part of Operation Absolute Resolve and claimed the U.S. would "run" Venezuela, although the Venezuelan government remains in place. On the morning of January 3, 2026, the United States launched Operation Absolute Resolve, a strike on Venezuela. After bombing military installations there, US Special Forces captured Venezuelan President Nicolás Maduro and his wife, Cilia Flores. The attack was met with mixed reactions both domestically and internationally. Questions over what the U.S. would do with Venezuela led to Trump's Deputy Chief of Staff Stephen Miller declaring "We're a superpower. And under President Trump, we are going to conduct ourselves as a superpower." In the days following the strike, Trump posted an altered Wikipedia screenshot on Truth Social listing himself as acting president of Venezuela rather than Delcy Rodríguez; Trump additionally responded affirmatively to another social media user's proposal of appointing United States Secretary of State Marco Rubio in the position.

In March 2026, following several wins and an ultimate victory by Venezuela during the 2026 World Baseball Classic, Trump on two occasions called for the eventual inclusion of Venezuela as the 51st state.

A report by The New York Times in July 2026 described Rubio as the de facto "viceroy" of Venezuela, effectively controlling its finances, natural resources, and government in a manner not seen since the Iraq War.

== Middle East ==
=== Iran ===
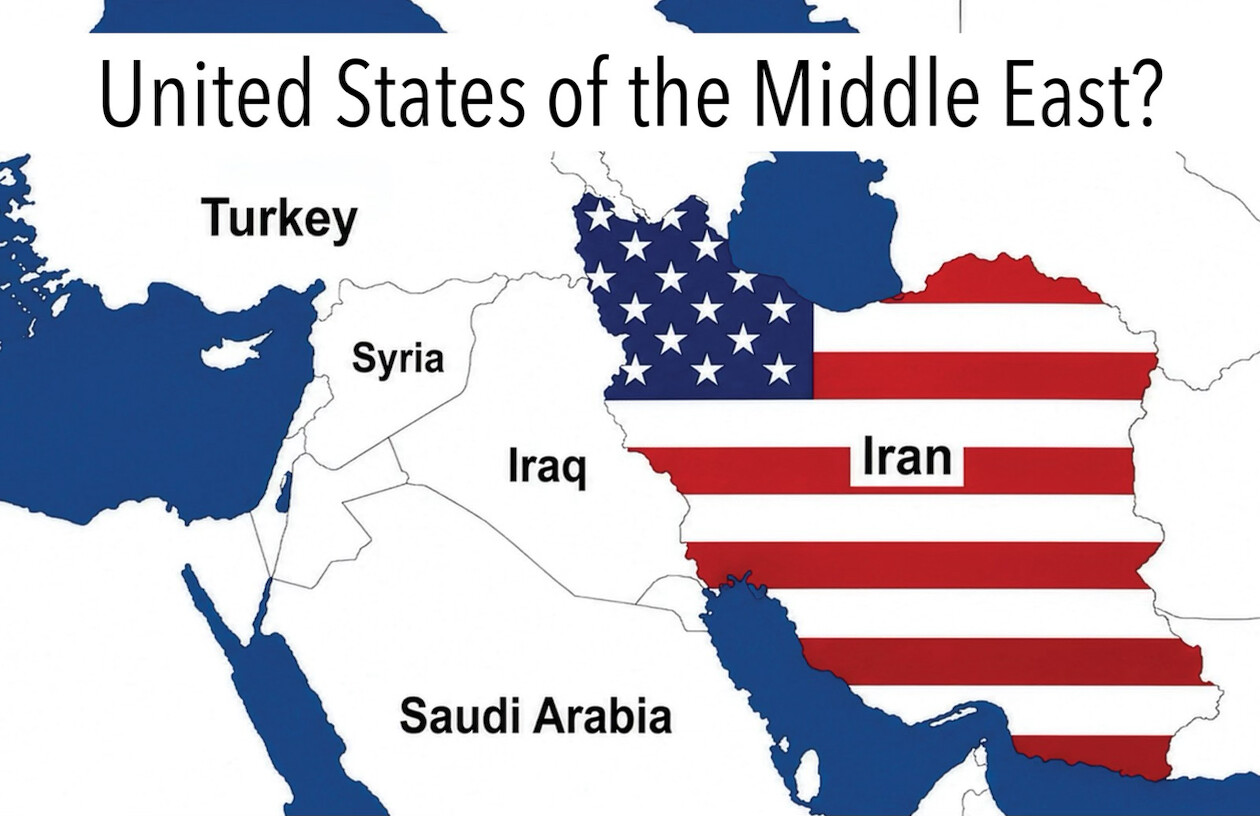
Truth Social image by Trump of a map of the U.S. flag covering Iran

Trump tried to apply the "Venezuela model" towards Iran in 2026 during the beginning of the 2026 Iran war by forcefully removing Iranian government with the intention of installing new and more "pragmatic" leadership that would be more compliant with U.S. demands such as greater access to oil reserves and other resources.

The Trump administration had refused to rule out military force to seize control of Kharg Island, which accounted for 90% of Iran's oil exports. However, it has since been reported that Trump has resisted launching an invasion of the island, due to the high number of predicted casualties, despite being advised that doing so would give the administration control over the strait. On May 23, Trump posted on Truth Social an image of the United States flag covering Iran in a map, the question reading "United States of the Middle East?" The post raised concerns about potential American occupation of Iran. Later, Trump again threatened to seize Kharg Island and take control of Iran's "oil infrastructure points".

US secretary of state Marco Rubio said in a speech in Athens on October 7th that US and Europe must "rediscover the values of conquest and expansion", comparing the 2026 Iran war to the Greco-Persian war that resulted in the burning of Athenian Acropolis. However, according to Touraj Daryaee, the war was about taking revenge on the burning of Sardis by the Athenians, rather than a clash between East and West. Indeed, the Persian Empire included Greek-speaking peoples who fought alongside Persians.

==== Strait of Hormuz ====
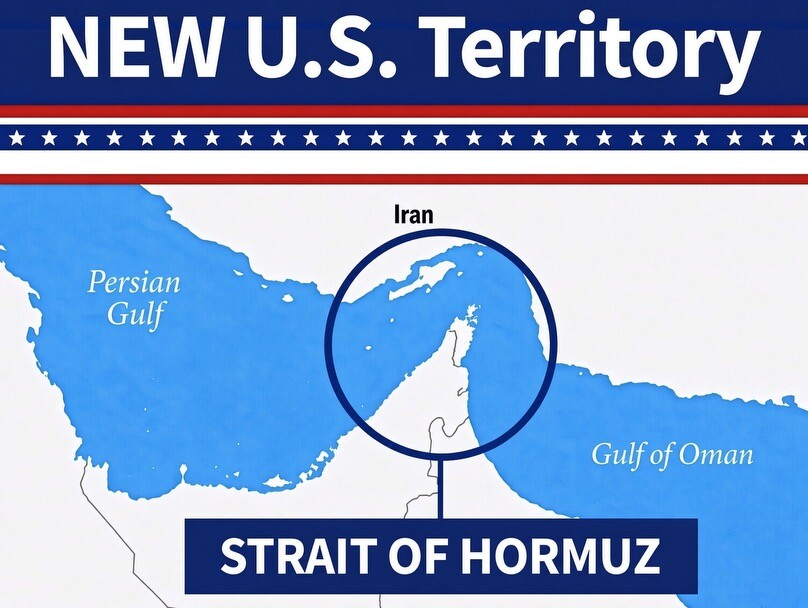
Truth Social post by Trump of a map depicting the Strait of Hormuz as an U.S. territory

During the war, Trump expressed interest in taking control of the Strait of Hormuz to secure it so that Iran is unable to close it during the conflict and thus squeeze oil exports in the region. In March 2026, Trump reaffirmed his interest in taking control of the strait and considered renaming it to the "Strait of America", also making a quip about the strait being named the "Strait of Trump" during a speech. In a speech at a police academy in New York on August 14, 2026, Trump said that "after winning the 2026 Iran war", he will "declare the Strait of Hormuz a territory of the United States". On August 18, Trump posted an image on Truth Social labelling the Strait a US territory. At the moment, Iran claims sovereignty over the strait.

=== Palestine ===
==== Gaza Strip ====
Trump and Israeli Prime Minister Netanyahu at a joint press conference announcing the U.S. peace plan for Gaza at the White House, September 29, 2025

Trump has proposed resettling Palestinians in the Gaza Strip elsewhere in places such as neighboring Egypt and Jordan, with the United States taking over and rebuilding it, following the Gaza war. Trump described ambitions to make Gaza "the Riviera of the Middle East," in which "the world's people" would live. According to reports, the United States was interested in resettling Gazans to either Syria, Sudan, Morocco, or the separatist Somali regions of Puntland and Somaliland. In May 2025, reports emerged that the Trump administration was working on a plan to permanently relocate 1 million Gazans to Libya, while offering the release of around $30 billion in funds frozen by the U.S. since the toppling of the regime of Muammar Gaddafi in exchange for Libyan authorities agreeing to the deal.

On February 21, 2025, after opposition from Arab states, Trump said he would "recommend" but not enforce his plan for the U.S. takeover of Gaza and the resettlement of the Palestinian population. On May 15, 2025, during his presidential visit to Qatar, Trump reiterated his desire for the United States to take over the Gaza Strip and "make it a freedom zone." On February 26, 2025, Trump posted an AI video on Truth Social. The video opens on war-torn images of Gaza before transitioning to videos of a beachfront resort, including shots of Elon Musk eating and dancing, bearded belly dancers performing and Trump and Israeli prime minister Benjamin Netanyahu—both shirtless—drinking poolside. The creators of the video said they did not know how Trump obtained the video and criticized Trump for posting the video without credit or permission, adding that they did not support Trump's "propaganda machine."

== Oceania ==
=== Marshall Islands and Micronesia ===
Donald J. Trump posted a map on Truth Social showcasing various flags he claimed to be U.S. territories alongside the Strait of Hormuz, amongst those flags and names, the flags of Marshall Islands and the Federated States of Micronesia were also present, with a part calling it an example of Trump's "ignorance", whilst other defined it as a threat or ambition. Marshall Islands President Hilda Heine called for "mutual respect" and recognition of "sovereignty" following the incident. The official X account of the Congressional Asian Pacific American Caucus commented that the post was a threat to the "ally" island nations.

== International reactions ==
Numerous politicians outside of the United States have criticized Donald Trump's annexation comments. Many have also compared Trump's comments about Canada, Greenland and Panama to Russian President Vladimir Putin's comments about Ukraine and CCP General Secretary Xi Jinping's comments about Taiwan. Experts believe that the U.S. president possesses an imperialist outlook, to the extent that former U.S. ambassador to NATO Ivo Daalder stated that under Trump's administration, the rules-based order has effectively ceased to exist.

According to a joint Washington Post-ABC News-Ipsos poll that was conducted in April 2025, 68% of Americans (including 81% of Democrats, 58% of Republicans and 65% of Independents) think that Trump is serious about trying to take control of Greenland. In the same poll, 53% of Americans (including 75% of Democrats, 35% of Republicans, and 49% of Independents) think that Trump is serious about trying to take control of Canada. The poll also showed the percentage of Americans who would support taking control of Canada and Greenland. 22% of Americans supported annexing Greenland and 76% of Americans opposed it, while 13% of Americans supported annexing Canada while 86% of Americans opposed it.

=== Canadian reaction ===
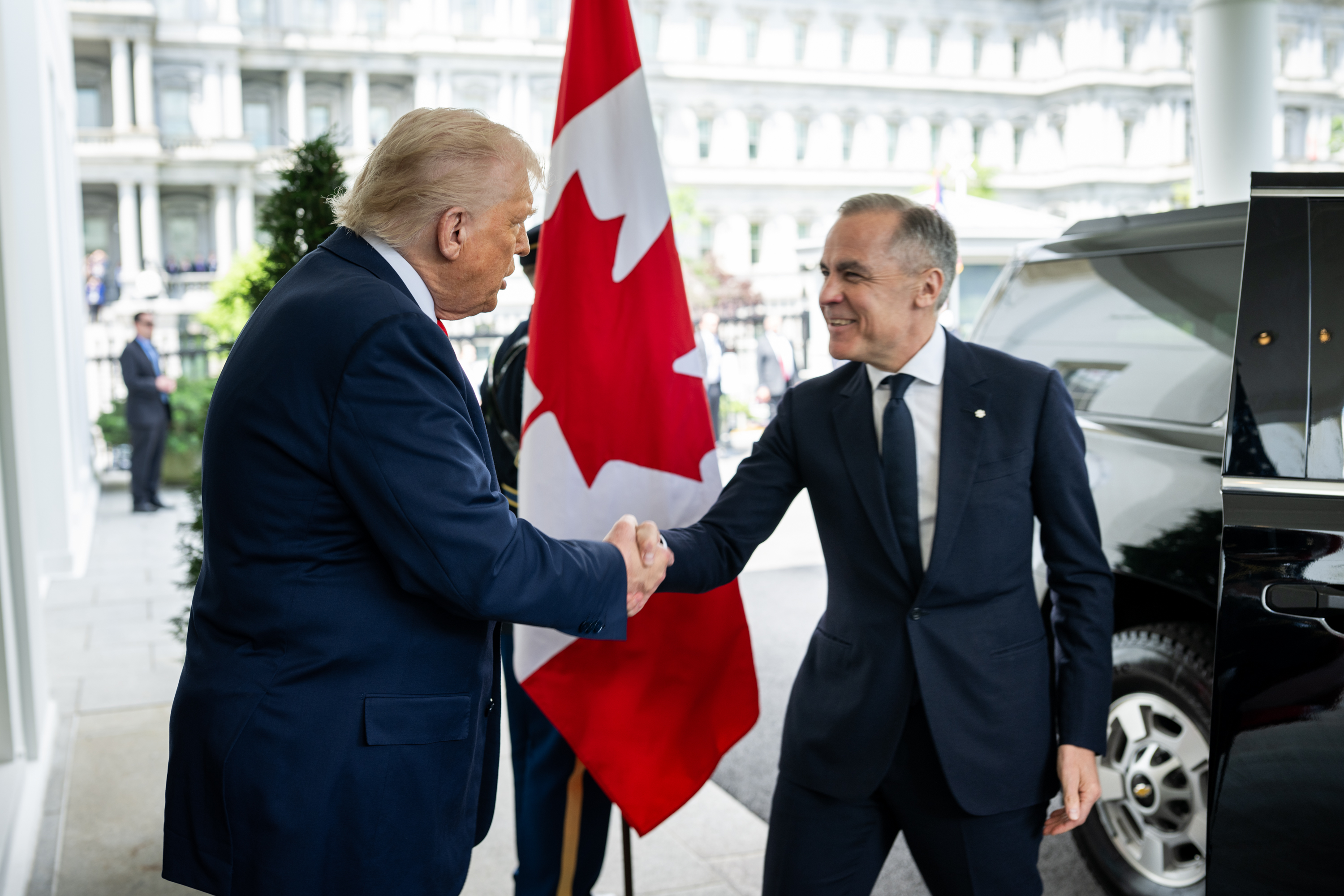
Trump with Canadian Prime Minister Mark Carney, May 6, 2025

Donald Trump's proposals have been received negatively across Canada, with it being condemned by all major federal political parties and leaders as well as causing an increasing strain on Canada–United States relations. Polling conducted on Trump's proposals have received extremely little support among Canadians to the proposal of Canada becoming the 51st State with an Angus Reid poll showing that 90% of Canadians are against being annexed by the United States. In a poll that was conducted on April 23, 2025, 82% of Canadians said that they would rather become a dominion of the British Empire again, than be annexed by the United States. Polls also showed a sharp rise in Canadian nationalism, especially among Quebecers.

An assessment by the University of Toronto showed that even if the United States successfully invaded Canada, carried out strategic bombing of Ottawa, and destroyed the Canadian Army, the United States Armed Forces would still have to deal with decades of resistance from Ontario and Quebec alone. Aisha Ahmad, a historian who has studied insurgencies for more than 20 years said, "Even if only 1% of Canada's population waged a war of resistance against American forces, that would be 400,000 insurgents. That's about 10 times the number of Taliban fighters who outlasted the American-led coalition in Afghanistan."

Canadian prime minister Justin Trudeau responded to Trump saying that there's "not a snowball's chance in hell" that Canada would be annexed by the United States. Conservative Leader Pierre Poilievre stated that Canada would never become the 51st state of America. On February 7, 2025, Poilievre further stated that Trump's 51st state comments are not a joke saying: "I've always taken it seriously, and I've always clearly and consistently condemned it. Canada will never be the 51st state. We will be a strong, independent, sovereign country when I'm prime minister." After winning the 2025 Canadian federal election, Canadian prime minister Mark Carney told the BBC during an interview, "He has territorial views. That's never, ever going to happen, with respect to Canada — frankly I don't think it's ever going to happen with respect to any other, whether it's Panama or Greenland or elsewhere."

=== Danish and Greenlandic reactions ===
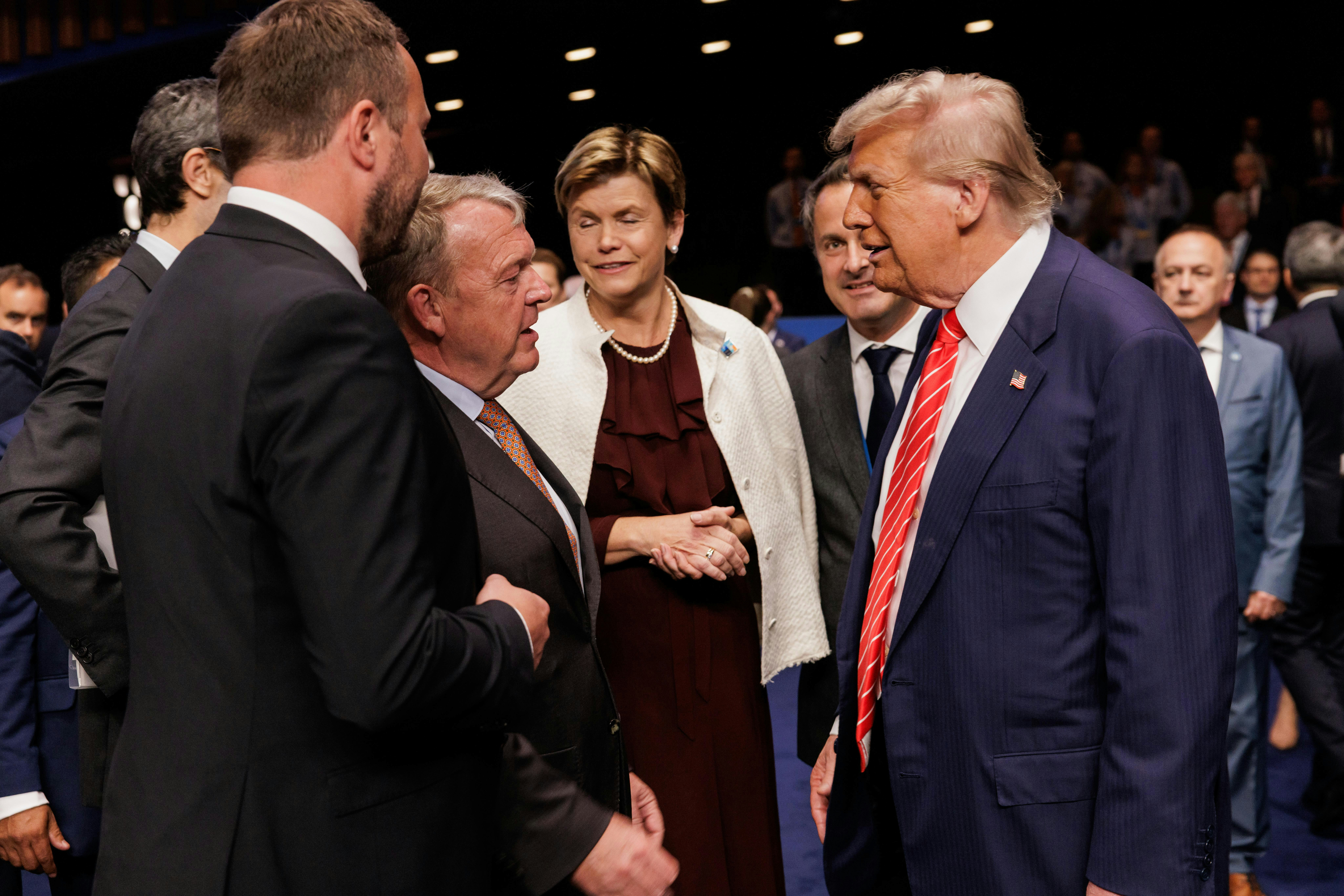
Trump with Danish Foreign Minister Lars Løkke Rasmussen at NATO summit in The Hague, June 25, 2025

The Danish government has repeatedly stated that "Greenland is not for sale". In a poll published by Berlingske and Sermitsiaq, 85% of Greenlanders have stated that they are against being annexed by the United States. The poll also showed that 45% of Greenlanders view Trump as a threat while 43% view Trump as an "opportunity" and 13% are undecided. Trump's interest in Greenland has bolstered the cause of the Greenlandic independence from Denmark.

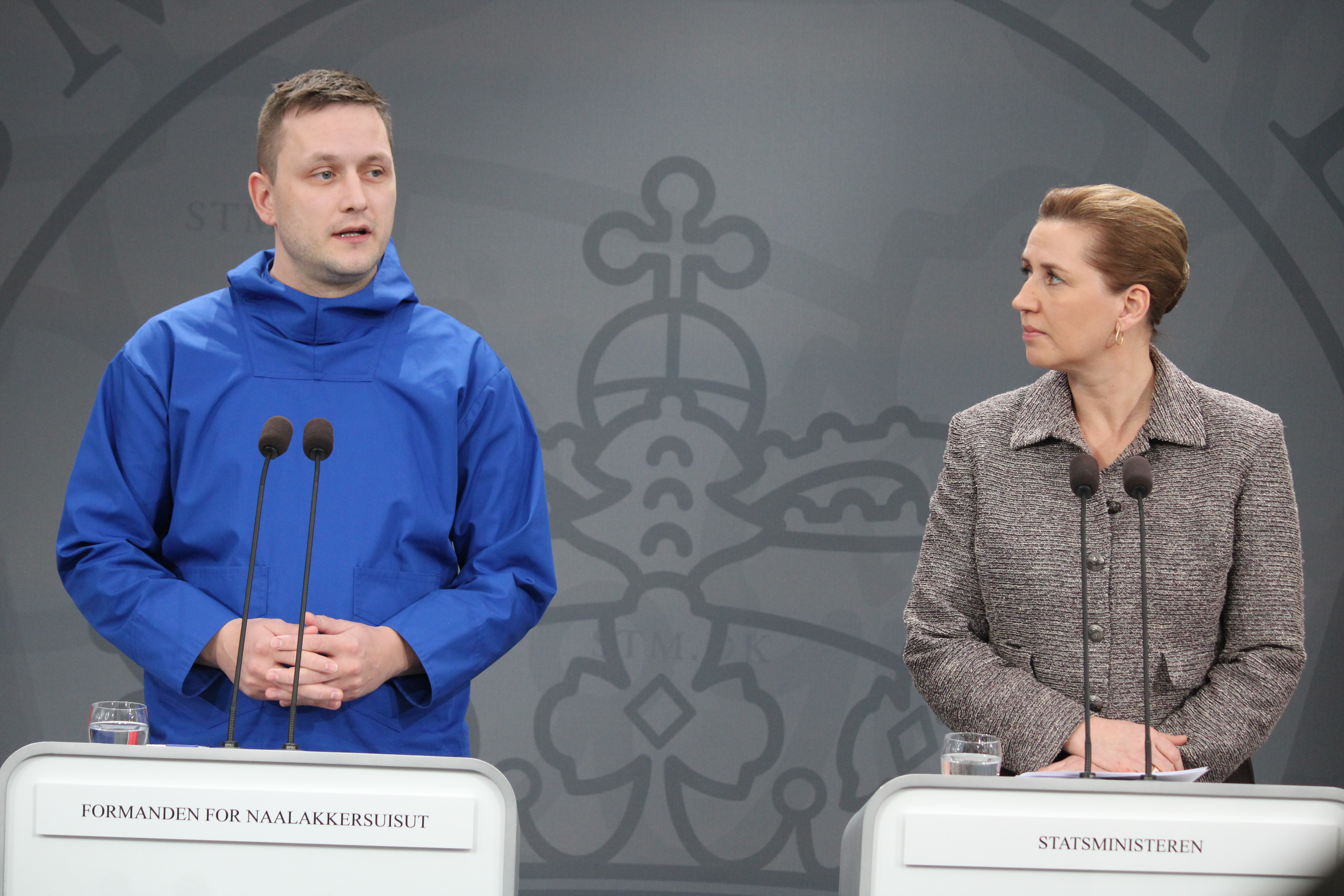
Greenlandic leader Jens Frederik-Nielsen announcing "We choose Denmark" at a January 2026 press conference with Mette Frederiksen in response to Trump's threats to invade or annex the country

Danish prime minister Mette Frederiksen said that "Europe must stand together" against Trump. During a press conference on January 21, 2025, Greenlandic prime minister Múte Bourup Egede stated, "We are Greenlanders. We don't want to be Americans. We don't want to be Danish either. Greenland's future will be decided by Greenland". Kristian Søby Kristensen, a defense researcher from the University of Copenhagen said that Denmark could not defend Greenland from America on its own and that the Danish Armed Forces are neither equipped nor trained to stop an American invasion from happening. Furthermore, Kristensen stated that Denmark's military stocks have been significantly depleted by arms transfers to Ukraine. On February 2, 2025, during an EU meeting in Brussels, Danish prime minister Mette Frederiksen told reporters "I will never support the idea of fighting allies. But of course, if the U.S. puts tough terms on Europe, we need a collective and robust response." On February 4, 2025, Greenland introduced a bill which would ban "foreign political donations". The bill is viewed as a way to safeguard the 2025 Greenlandic general election which was held on March 11, 2025.

==== Third-party reactions ====
Most European politicians have voiced their support for Denmark. French foreign minister Jean-Noël Barrot said that if Denmark were to request "solidarity" from EU countries, "France will be there." He also stated that France would not tolerate American military intervention. France also debated with Denmark about the possibility of the deployment of French troops to Greenland. In a private message to Donald Trump, French president Emmanuel Macron stated: "I do not understand what you are doing on Greenland". On February 4, 2025, NATO secretary general Mark Rutte sat down with EU leaders for lunch and suggested the deployment of NATO soldiers to Greenland in order to "defang the threat from the U.S. president".

Trump signing a trilateral agreement with Danish Prime Minister Frederiksen and Greenlandic Prime Minister Nielsen at the UN Headquarters in New York City, September 22, 2026

During a meeting with Danish prime minister Mette Frederiksen, German chancellor Olaf Scholz stated that, "Borders must not be moved by force. To whom it may concern." Russian press secretary Dmitry Peskov said, "We are watching very closely this rather dramatic development of the situation, so far, thank God, at the level of statements." In contrast, Italian prime minister Giorgia Meloni was rather skeptical regarding Trump's statements, stating that she did not believe President-elect Trump has a plan to purchase Greenland, Panama or Canada or acquire them through military force, suggesting that instead it was merely a "message" to other "Great Powers" (such as China).

==== Danish counter-proposal to purchase California ====
In response to Trump's statements during his second term, Danish residents issued a satirical petition for Denmark to purchase California from the United States for $1 trillion. The petition parodied Trump's rhetoric as president, bearing the slogan "Måke Califørnia Great Ægain" and vowing to "bring hygge to Hollywood, bike lanes to Beverly Hills and organic smørrebrød to every street corner." It also stated that California's name would be changed to "New Denmark". The petition surpassed 200,000 signatures in less than 12 hours.

=== Mexican reaction ===
Mexican president Claudia Sheinbaum responded to Trump's annexation suggestion by saying, "Mexico is a free, sovereign, and independent country, and we will always defend that." Sheinbaum responded to Trump renaming the gulf by saying that Google Maps should present the map of América Mexicana over the United States. She also explained that territorial waters only extend up to 12 nautical miles, and that the renaming could not apply to the entire gulf.

=== Venezuelan reaction ===
On January 13, 2025, Venezuelan president Nicolas Maduro called for a military campaign to "liberate" Puerto Rico with the aid of Brazilian, Cuban, and Nicaraguan troops. Maduro said in a speech during a rally, "Just as in the north they have an agenda of colonization, we have an agenda of liberation. And the agenda was written for us by Simon Bolivar, the freedom of Puerto Rico is pending and we will achieve it, with the troops of Brazil. We are preparing together with Cuba and Nicaragua and together with our older brothers in the world so that if one day we have to take up arms and defend the right to peace and sovereignty, we will fight in the armed struggle and win it again. We are not lukewarm leaders, we are the Bolivarian Revolution of the 21st century. If it is by fair means, we will advance by fair means. If it is by foul means, we will also defeat them so that they respect us".

On 18 August 2025, in response to the United States increasing the bounty on his head to $50 million USD, Venezuelan President Nicolás Maduro announced a mass mobilization of the Bolivarian Militia of Venezuela. 4.5 million men and women were reported to have been mobilized. On 3 January 2026, the United States launched strikes on Venezuela, captured Maduro and his wife Cilia Flores, and flew them to New York City to face drugs and weapons charges. Trump said the U.S. would "run" Venezuela until there was a transition of power. Trump made it clear that access to Venezuelan oil was a major reason for the attack.

=== Panamanian reaction ===
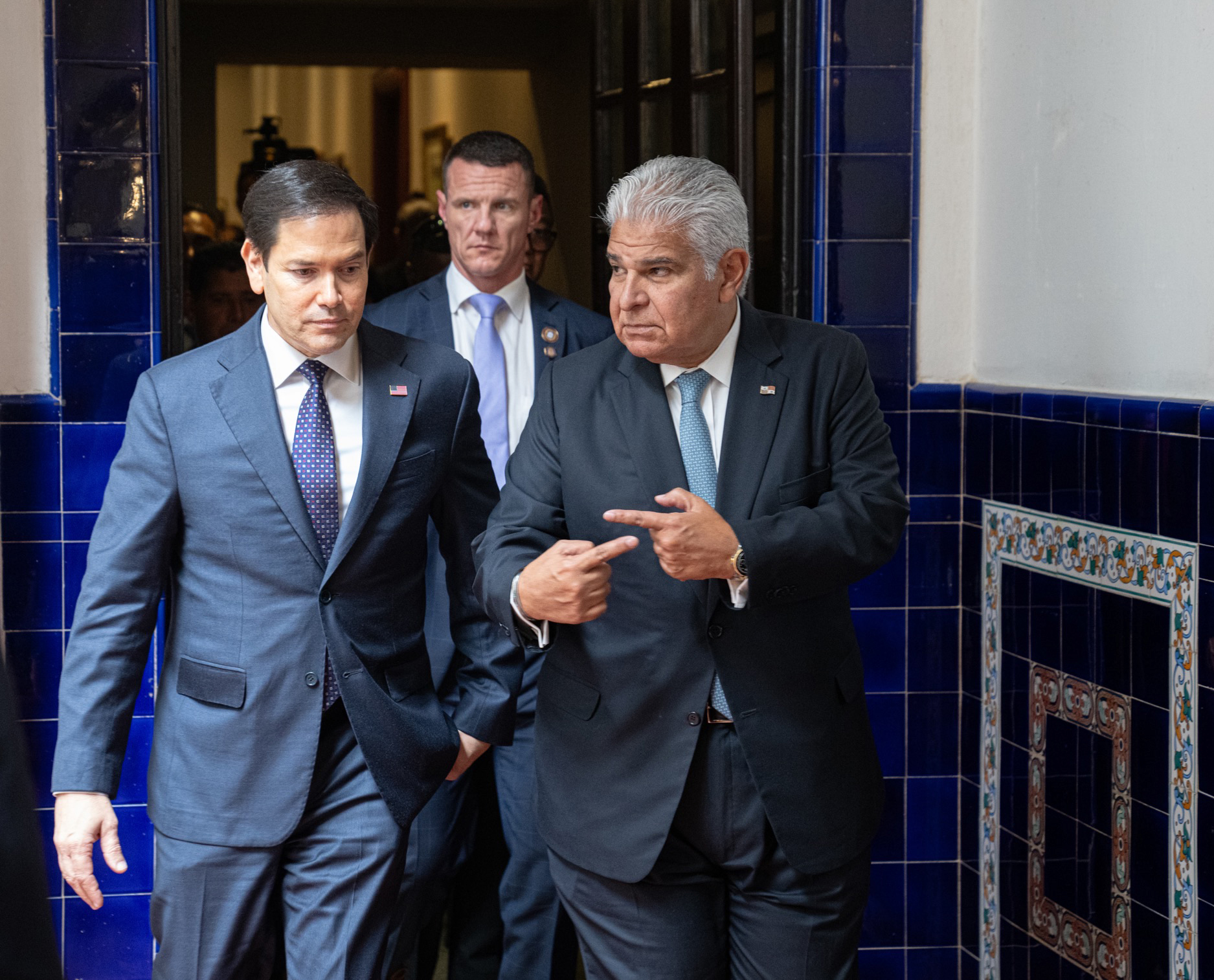
Secretary of State Marco Rubio with Panamanian President José Raúl Mulino in Panama City, February 2, 2025

Panamanians say the Panama Canal is part of their national identity. Paula Rodriguez, a cafe owner told the Guardian, "Panamanian people – we rise, you know, we defend and we unite, after all, to defend our country and our people. Because it's not about the canal, it's about our integrity. If you can see in the social media, people are angry, angry, and writing: 'No way – this is not gonna happen again." Numerous anti-American protests have taken place across Panama since December 24, 2024. On January 28, 2025, a coalition of civil society groups released a joint statement which condemned "any foreign political intervention". Political scientist Osvaldo Jordán told CNN on February 21, 2024, that Panama was "already in a situation of instability... then President Trump jumps onto the scene." In a poll that was conducted by DoxaPanamá in April 2025 asking "who would you want managing the Panama Canal?" 81% of Panamanians said the Panama Canal Authority, 16% said the U.S. Government, and 3% said that they don't know.

Panamanian president José Raúl Mulino rejected Trump's claims about "retaking" the Panama Canal. He further stated, "Every square meter of the Panama Canal and its adjacent area belong to Panama and will continue to be. The sovereignty and independence of our country are not negotiable." On March 19, 2025, Mulino said that Panama "will not give in to Trump's canal threats." Saúl Méndez of SUNTRACS said in an interview, "Trump tries to erase with a single whim, what was conquered here with the life of patriots, but today more than ever the defense of sovereignty is intact in the Panamanian people."

Panama's UN Ambassador Eloy Alfaro de Alba stated that the United States should refrain from the threat or use of force against the territorial integrity or political independence of any state. Panama City mayor Mayer Mizrachi posted on his X account that Panama would never become the 51st state. Former Panamanian president Ernesto Pérez Balladares said that if the U.S. were to invade there would be "many, many casualties on our side, and international condemnation of the U.S." After Pete Hegseth's comment on April 9, 2025, about the idea to station American soldiers in military bases and airfields in Panama, Panama's Defense Minister Frank Abrego said during a joint press conference in Panama City, "Panama has made it clear through President Mulino that we cannot accept military bases or defensive installations." On June 12, 2025, Panamanian political analyst José Stouten said that, "Trump's impact has been devastating for the internal situation. The Trump effect has deepened the delegitimization of the government."

==== Reactions to the joint security deal ====
After the signing of the joint security deal with the United States, many Panamanian politicians and citizens have criticized the government. On April 10, 2025, several groups of workers protested while chanting "No bases!". More protests were planned for April 12, 2025. Panamanian trade union leader Saul Mendez told Agence France-Presse about the joint security deal, "What we have here is a setback to national sovereignty. What the Panamanian government has done is an act of treason. They are traitors and must be tried." On April 11, 2025, leader of the opposition Ricardo Lombana called the joint security deal, "an invasion without firing a shot." On April 12, 2025, protesters took to the streets of Panama City, shouting that President José Raúl Mulino is a traitor to the country for signing the security deal with the United States. Saul Mendez, a trade union leader and one of the protest organizers said about the protests, "Both Trump, Rubio and now Pete Hegseth have indicated that they are going to take the canal, and obviously the Panamanian people cannot accept this. And that is why we, a handful of patriots, are on the street today, rejecting the presence of the 'secretary of war' in Panama and repudiating Mulino, the traitor, who behind the people's back is giving away our sovereignty and our self-determination."

On April 13, 2025, The United People's Alliance of Panama issued a statement which reads, "The country is being handed over with the four military bases that have been talked about. We cannot accept that. In this country, several generations of Panamanians fought for the sovereignty of the country, and today the dictator [Mulino] wants to hand over the sovereignty of this country and that cannot go unnoticed. We request international solidarity from peoples around the world and progressive, democratic, and revolutionary governments. We call for struggle and popular mobilization in defense of our national sovereignty. We reject Pete Hegseth's presence in Panama." On April 28, 2025, SUNTRACS and several Panama teachers' unions announced the beginning of an "indefinite strike" and began protesting in the streets. On April 29, 2025, hundreds of people took to the streets of Panama City to protest the joint security deal. Protesters claimed that the deal undermines the sovereignty of Panama.

On April 30, 2025, thousands of people took to the streets of Panama City in order to protest the joint security deal. Protest organizer Camila Aybar told the media, "We protest because they have stomped over the sovereignty of entire generations who have fought. They dumped our sovereignty to the trash by signing a memorandum of understanding that allows foreign military presence in Panama. Down with the memorandum! Down with the memorandum! Sovereign Panama!" On May 6, 2025, thousands of students and workers protested on the streets of Panama City. France 24 reported that this protest was, "the biggest in three weeks of strikes and protests." Tony Ruiz, one of the striking students, told reporters, "We feel like our president is acting against the wishes of many Panamanians and in very sensitive affairs. He signs an agreement behind our back that compromises our sovereignty, our neutrality with the world." On May 8, 2025, Panamanian president José Raúl Mulino announced that despite the protests, he would not renegotiate the security agreement that his government had made with the United States. On May 11, 2025, The National Coordinator of Indigenous Peoples of Panama announced that they were preparing for street closures as a protest measure. On May 14, 2025, the protests entered their third week. On May 23, 2025, thousands of people took to the streets across Panama in order to protest the arrest of two labor union leaders who were both vocal opponents of Panamanian president José Raúl Mulino's government. On June 4, 2025, protesters and police officers clashed in Arimae, Darién Province causing casualties on both sides.

==== Legal actions ====
On April 11, 2025, local lawyer Neftalí Jaén filed a legal case with the National Assembly of Panama against Panamanian president José Raúl Mulino. Jaén claims that Mulino violated Article 425 of the Penal Code of Panama which criminalizes "crimes against the international personality of the state". Jaén also stated that under Article 425, the signing of agreements, conventions, or treaties that affect Panama's sovereignty could carry penalties of 20 to 30 years in prison if the act is committed by a public servant.

On April 16, 2025, lawyer Juan Ramón Sevillano, on behalf of the Sal de las Redes civic coalition, filed a case to Panama's Supreme Court. Sevillano's case states that the joint security deal that the Mulino government signed was "unconstitutional" due to the joint security deal violating 6 articles of Panama's constitution as well as violating the Torrijos–Carter Treaties. In a document submitted to the supreme court, Sevillano also accused the security deal of being signed under pressure from the United States, saying that the "memorandum is a response to the pressures and threats we have been subjected to by the American nation, which, taking advantage of its greater military and economic power, has imposed its will in this agreement."

==== Third-party reactions ====
Chinese Foreign Ministry Spokesman Lin Jian condemned the United States' "irresponsible remarks on the Panama Canal issue, and intentionally distorted, attacked and mischaracterized relevant cooperation". On April 9, 2025, Chinese Foreign Ministry spokesman Lin Jian "firmly rejected" the remarks made by Hegseth stating, "The malicious attack against China and attempt to smear and undermine China-Panama cooperation once again revealed the bullying and hegemonic nature of the U.S. The U.S. should take a hard look in the mirror and reflect on who is truly threatening the sovereignty, security, and development of other countries."

On April 10, 2025, the Chinese Embassy in Panama accused the Trump administration of blackmailing Panama with "repeated threats of seizing the Panama Canal" in order to diminish Chinese influence in the region. On April 23, 2025, Chinese Foreign Ministry spokesman Guo Jiakun stated, "The comments made by Panama's media have accurately exposed the essence of U.S. hegemonic behavior. The U.S. has fabricated the lie of 'China controlling the Panama Canal' and maliciously attacked China, which is merely an excuse to justify its control over the Canal and push forward its expansionist and 'Monroe Doctrine'-style hegemonic agenda. The international community and the people of Panama see this very clearly. Panamanian President José Raúl Mulino also rejected the false claim of Chinese interference because this is not based on facts."

=== French reaction ===
After Trump posted a map on September 7, 2026 with an American flag covering all of North America, as well as Iceland and islands in the Caribbean, French presidential candidate Jean-Luc Mélenchon reacted by stating "Macron should send the [Charles de Gaulle] aircraft carrier to keep control of our sovereignty and reassure threatened populations." France is present in the Caribbean through its French West Indies islands of Saint Martin, Saint Barthélémy, Martinique and Guadeloupe, which are an integral part of the French Republic.

On September 19, 2026, French president Emmanuel Macron visited Saint Pierre and Miquelon, the first French president to do so in 12 years. The visit was seen as a reaction to the map posted by Trump, and served to affirm French control over the territory. He was joined by Canadian PM Mark Carney. Both leaders emphasized their common values during the visit.

== United States reaction ==
=== No Invading Allies Act ===
On March 6, 2025, Democratic representative Seth Magaziner introduced legislation which would prevent Trump from going to war with Canada, Greenland, or Panama without a vote from Congress. The bill would also prevent the United States Armed Forces from using federal funds in an invasion of Canada, Greenland or Panama without the approval of Congress.

=== Bill Against Military Actions Against Venezuela ===
On October 17, 2025, Democratic senators Tim Kaine of Virginia, Adam Schiff of California, and Republican senator Rand Paul of Kentucky announced that they would force a bipartisan vote on a war powers resolution that would prevent the United States from taking military action against Venezuela without the approval of Congress. The bill advanced out of the Foreign Relations Committee on January 8, 2026 after five Republicans joined the Democrats in voting for it. The bill failed final approval after Josh Hawley of Missouri and Todd Young of Indiana flipped their votes resulting in a 50–50 tie, which was then voted down by Vice President JD Vance in his role as President of the Senate.

== See also ==
- 51st state
- Donroe Doctrine
- Foreign interventions by the United States
- Imperialism by the Trump administration
- Manifest destiny
- Movements for the annexation of Canada to the United States
- North American Union
- Pax Americana
- Proposals for the United States to purchase Greenland
- Proposed United States invasion of Venezuela
- Territorial expansion of the United States
- United States involvement in regime change
- America shock
