= Proposed United States invasion of Venezuela =

Proposed invasion

Map of the United States (green) and Venezuela (orange)

The possibility of a United States-led invasion of Venezuela has been frequently discussed during the presidencies of Donald Trump.

In 2017, during his first presidency, Trump said that he was "not going to rule out a military option" to address the worsening crisis in Venezuela. In 2025, during his second presidency, the United States surged military assets to the Caribbean as part of Operation Southern Spear, citing the fight against drug cartels as its stated objective. During this buildup, experts, analysts and current and former government officials stated that the assets deployed were insufficient for an invasion and that they viewed an invasion as unlikely.

In 2026, the United States launched Operation Absolute Resolve, conducting airstrikes on Venezuela and capturing President Nicolás Maduro and his wife Cilia Flores. This led to questions being raised about the possibility of long-term military intervention involving ground troops in Venezuela.

== First presidency of Donald Trump ==
According to the Associated Press, within the framework of the crisis in Venezuela, unnamed administration officials stated that an intervention was raised in 2017 to Trump's advisors, including U.S. Secretary of State Rex Tillerson and national security advisor H. R. McMaster (who left the Trump administration from that moment on) and later to several presidents of Latin American countries including Juan Manuel Santos. Gustavo Petro, president of Colombia, declared in May 2023 that Trump had made a proposal to then-president Iván Duque to invade Venezuela through Colombia, but that his advisors had stopped him. On both occasions, everyone present asked Trump not to proceed with the plan.

On the possibility of intervention in Venezuela during the Venezuelan presidential crisis, Assistant Secretary of State for Western Hemisphere Affairs Kimberly Breier said: "Although our policy is based on a peaceful transition, we have made it very clear that all options are on the table." John Bolton, National Security advisor at the time, published in a 2020 book, The Room Where It Happened, that Trump said that invading Venezuela would be "cool" because it is "really part of the United States". In his 2019 memoir, The Threat, former Deputy Director of the FBI, Andrew McCabe, quotes Trump as saying of Venezuela "That's the country we should be going to war with, they have all that oil and they're right on our back door."

Trump stated on 11 August 2017 that he is "not going to rule out a military option" to confront the autocratic government of Nicolás Maduro and the deepening crisis in Venezuela. CNN wrote in July 2018 that a senior administration official stated that, in an August 2017 meeting about imposing diplomatic and financial sanctions on Venezuela, Trump asked senior advisers about the possibility of invading Venezuela. Then-National Security Advisor H. R. McMaster and other aides strongly advised against military action, warning that it could backfire and that regional allies opposed such measures. The official emphasized that there was "no imminent plan" for an invasion, describing Trump's remarks as thinking "out loud". Trump's comments were first reported by the Associated Press and came a day before he publicly stated that a "military option" against Venezuela remained possible.

Trump raised the issue with Latin American leaders on the sidelines of the 72nd session of the United Nations General Assembly, though they uniformly rejected the idea. The Trump administration subsequently pursued a policy of sanctions and diplomatic pressure on Venezuela while continuing to call for free and fair elections. One week after U.S. federal prosecutors indicted Maduro on narcoterrorism charges, Trump announced at a White House press conference in April 2020 that the U.S. was deploying Navy destroyers, surveillance aircraft, and additional military personnel to the Caribbean near Venezuela; the Associated Press reported that there was "no indication ... that any sort of U.S. invasion is being planned".

Trump said on Fox News in May 2020 that "If we ever did anything with Venezuela", in that case, "it would be called 'invasion'", explaining: "if I wanted to go into Venezuela I wouldn't make a secret about it", and "I wouldn't send a small, little group, no, no, no. It would be called an army". An Argentine online paper wrote in August 2020 that Senator Marco Rubio had suggested a U.S. invasion of Venezuela during at least two meetings with senior White House officials, aiming to secure President Trump's Latino vote in Florida ahead of the 2020 presidential election. Vice President Mike Pence and Secretary of State Mike Pompeo opposed the proposal, rejecting the use of military force. This disagreement was among the reasons Bolton resigned as National Security Advisor.

=== Interregnum ===
In May 2022, during an interview with CBS's 60 Minutes, former U.S. Secretary of Defense Mark Esper told host Norah O'Donnell that President Trump had considered taking military action against Venezuela, as well as launching strikes on Iran (which made possible in his second term), and imposing a naval blockade on Cuba. Esper stated that he opposed such proposals, describing them as "dangerous things". and said he worked to prevent them. The remarks came shortly before the release of his memoir A Sacred Oath.

In January 2023, former United States Secretary of State Mike Pompeo published his memoir Never Give an Inch: Fighting for the America I Love. In the book, Pompeo claimed that during the first Trump administration, the United States adopted a series of aggressive measures aimed at influencing Venezuelan politics. These included applying economic pressure during the 2018 presidential election, attempting to persuade Maduro to step down, acknowledging the diplomatic status of businessman Alex Saab, and even discussing the possibility of a military intervention.

In May 2023, Colombian president Gustavo Petro said that Trump had made a proposal to then-president Iván Duque to invade Venezuela through Colombia, but that his advisors had stopped him. In June 2023, Trump said at a press conference in North Carolina, "When I left, Venezuela was ready to collapse. We would have taken over it, we would have gotten all that oil."

== Second presidency of Donald Trump ==
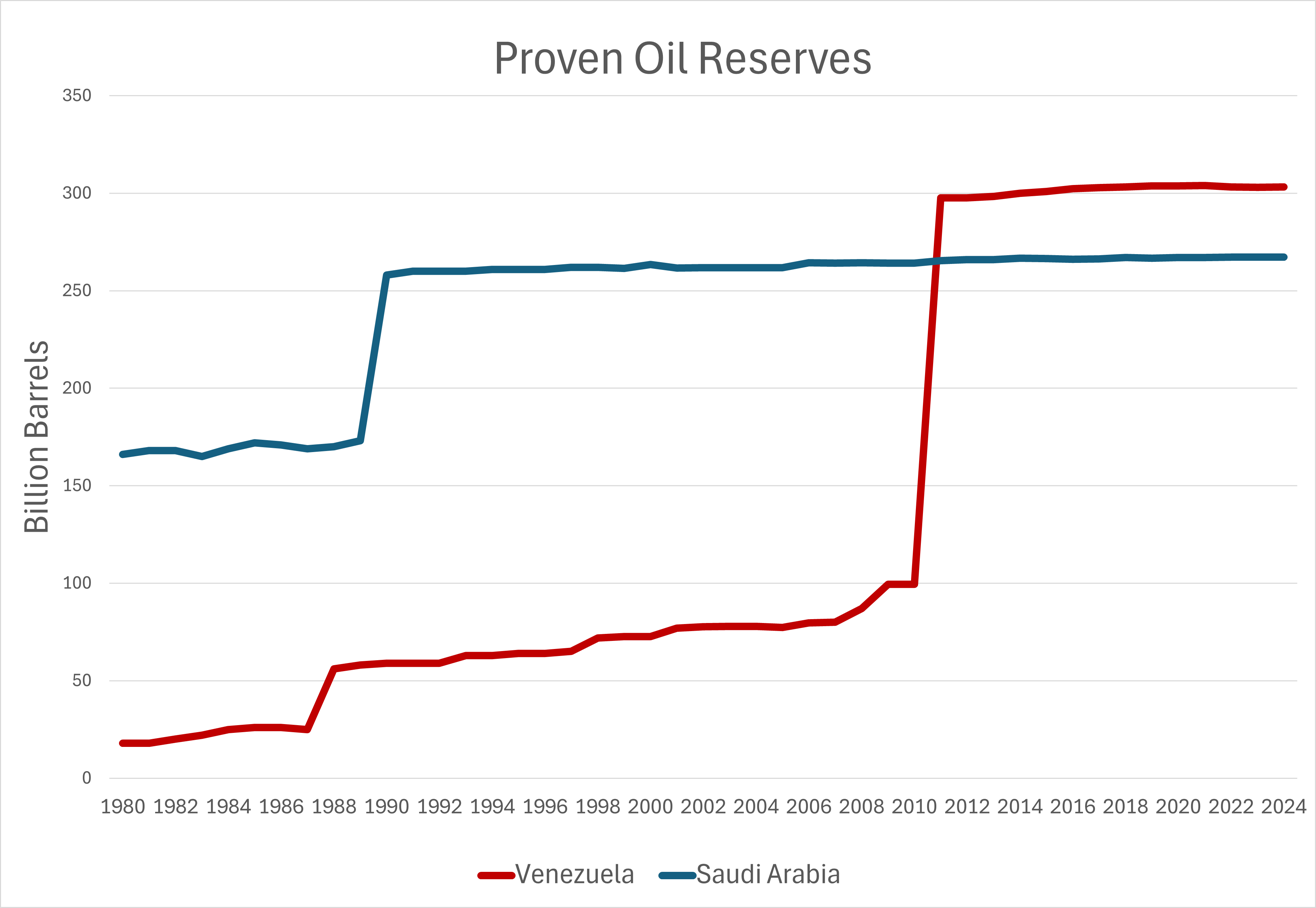
Trump has expressed interest in Venezuela's oil. The country has the largest proven oil fields in the world.

In November 2024, President-elect Trump nominated Senator Marco Rubio to serve as U.S. Secretary of State in his second administration. Rubio has long advocated for an interventionist U.S. response to the crisis in Venezuela during his time in the Senate, stating that "all options should remain on the table to remove Maduro from power and restore democracy in Venezuela", while recognizing Edmundo González as the rightful winner of the 2024 Venezuelan presidential election. In July−August 2025, the United States targeted drug cartels, designated the Venezuelan Cartel of the Suns as a terrorist organization, and doubled the reward on Maduro to $50 million. Attorney General Pam Bondi described Maduro as one of the "world's most notorious narco-traffickers" and a "threat to national security."

The United States began deploying naval assets to the Caribbean in August 2025 with the stated goal of opposing drug cartels; the Associated Press reported that the "U.S. government has not signaled any planned land incursion from the thousands of personnel being deployed, and analysts and current and former government officials see no possibility of an invasion in Venezuela". Maduro responded to the deployment by calling for people to join the Bolivarian Militia, and stated that the country was at "maximum preparedness" for a possible American attack.

Time stated that four million members of the Bolivarian Militia were mobilized on 18 August. PBS stated that the authorities' 4.5 million estimate of the Bolivarian Militia membership had been "long" unchanged, and in August 2025 was "certainly an overcount". CNN reported in September 2025 that Trump was considering a range of options for military strikes against drug cartels operating on Venezuelan soil, including potential targets inside the country, as part of a broader strategy aimed at weakening Maduro, according to multiple sources briefed on the administration's plans.

=== 2026 strikes and capture of Maduro ===
In the early morning on 3 January 2026, multiple explosions were reported in Caracas. U.S. officials confirmed that Trump had ordered strikes on Venezuelan targets, including military facilities. President Maduro announced a state of emergency and the government said the strikes had occurred in Caracas and in the states of Miranda, Aragua and La Guaira. U.S. forces captured Maduro and his wife, Cilia Flores, during a "large-scale strike" on the country. The announcement, made via Truth Social, stated that the operation was conducted in conjunction with U.S. law enforcement and that the couple had been removed from Venezuela.

In the aftermath of Maduro's capture, Trump stated in a press conference on 3 January 2026 that "[w]e are going to run the country until such time as we can do a safe, proper and judicious transition". Trump also expressed openness to the possibility of deploying ground troops to Venezuela, saying that the United States was "not afraid of boots on the ground", though at the same time downplayed the idea of a long-term military intervention when asked. In terms of the country's oil supply, Trump stated that the industry would be "up and running" in eighteen months or less" and suggested the United States could reimburse the oil companies that paid the upfront cost; he stated, "A tremendous amount of money will have to be spent, and the oil companies will spend it, and then they'll get reimbursed by us or through revenue." Maduro's allies remain in power in Venezuela.

== Analysis ==
The Wall Street Journal reported that there were too few U.S. naval and air assets in the Caribbean as of October 2025 to carry out an invasion, with military expert Mark Cancian from the Center for Strategic and International Studies stating there were too few troops deployed by a factor of between 5 and 20. International relations professor Stephen Kinzer compared the idea of invading Venezuela to arrest Maduro on U.S. drug trafficking charges to the actual 1989 United States invasion of Panama, in which it arrested Manuel Noriega on U.S. drug trafficking charges. In September 2025, Kinzer warned against thinking such an operation would be as easy, given the United States had many troops based in the Panama Canal Zone, and that Panama was a much smaller country with a smaller military. Both Maduro and Noriega attracted ire for anti-American stances, though Noriega had previously collaborated with the Central Intelligence Agency (CIA) and had been offered the option to quietly leave power.

Shannon K. O'Neil from the Council on Foreign Relations opined in 2018 that an American military intervention in Venezuela would "be a disaster". She assessed that the United States would need over 100,000 troops to invade the country and that American troops would have to deal with Venezuela's destroyed infrastructure, armed militias, local drug cartels, and the blame from international observers if they were unable to rebuild the nation. Al Jazeera stated on 5 December 2025 that "what nearly all experts have ruled out is a ground invasion".

== María Corina Machado ==
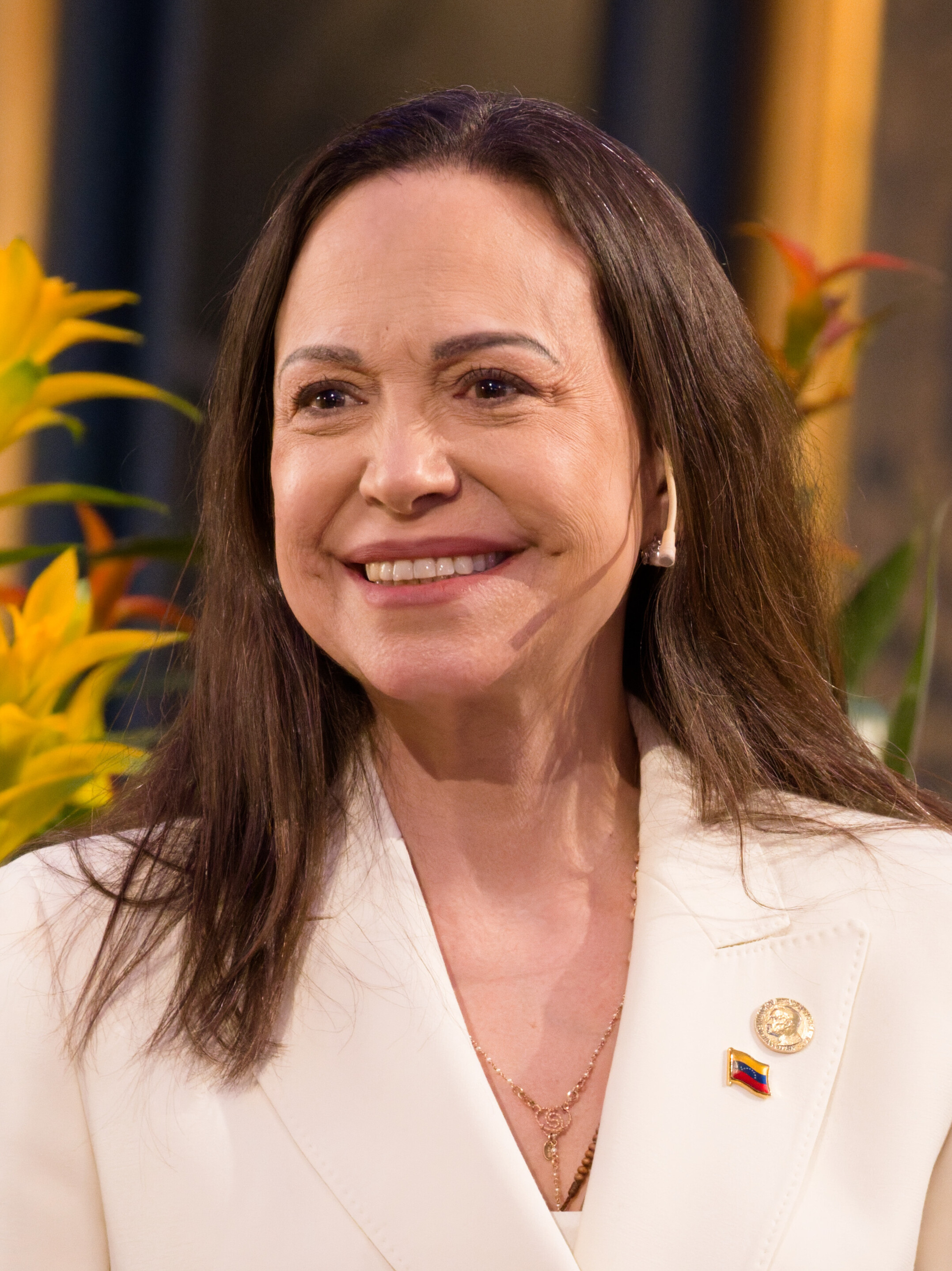
Venezuelan opposition leader María Corina Machado

After being asked if she supported a United States invasion, Venezuelan opposition leader María Corina Machado stated in a press conference after receiving the 2025 Nobel Peace Prize that she believed "Venezuela has already been invaded", and alleged that the Maduro government has allowed the presence of foreign actors and criminal organisations to be "operating freely in accordance with the regime" and turning "Venezuela into the criminal hub of the Americas". She claimed "what sustains the regime" is funding "from drug trafficking, from the black market of oil, from arms trafficking, and from human trafficking, and those flows need to be cut." Machado said she would restore diplomatic relations with Israel if Maduro were ousted and she came to power.

Trump himself commented that he believes it would be "very tough for her to be the leader", arguing that Machado on "doesn't have the support or the respect within the country". Two sources close to the White House told The Washington Post that Trump had all but dropped his support for Machado because she had accepted the 2025 Nobel Peace Prize, which Trump had wanted for himself: as put by one of the sources, "If she had turned it down and said, 'I can't accept it because it's Donald Trump's,' she'd be the president of Venezuela today." Alternatively, The New York Times reported that Trump was persuaded against supporting Machado after testimony from several senior advisors, including his Secretary of State Marco Rubio, who warned supporting Machado would create further destabilization in Venezuela and force the deployment of U.S. military assets. A source with access to a classified CIA analysis said much the same to The New York Times, which also reported Trump's White House had been growing annoyed with Machado after she falsely reported Maduro's government was on the "verge of collapse".

== See also ==
- American imperialism – Expansion of American political, economic, and military influence
- Foreign interventions by the United States
- American expansionism under Donald Trump
- United States involvement in regime change – List of U.S.-backed regime change operations
- Venezuelan crisis of 1902–1903 – Naval blockade against Venezuela
- War on drugs – U.S.-led campaign against illegal drug use and trade
- War on terror – Military campaign following the September 11 attacks
