= Expansionism =

Consists of policies of states that involve territorial or economic expansion

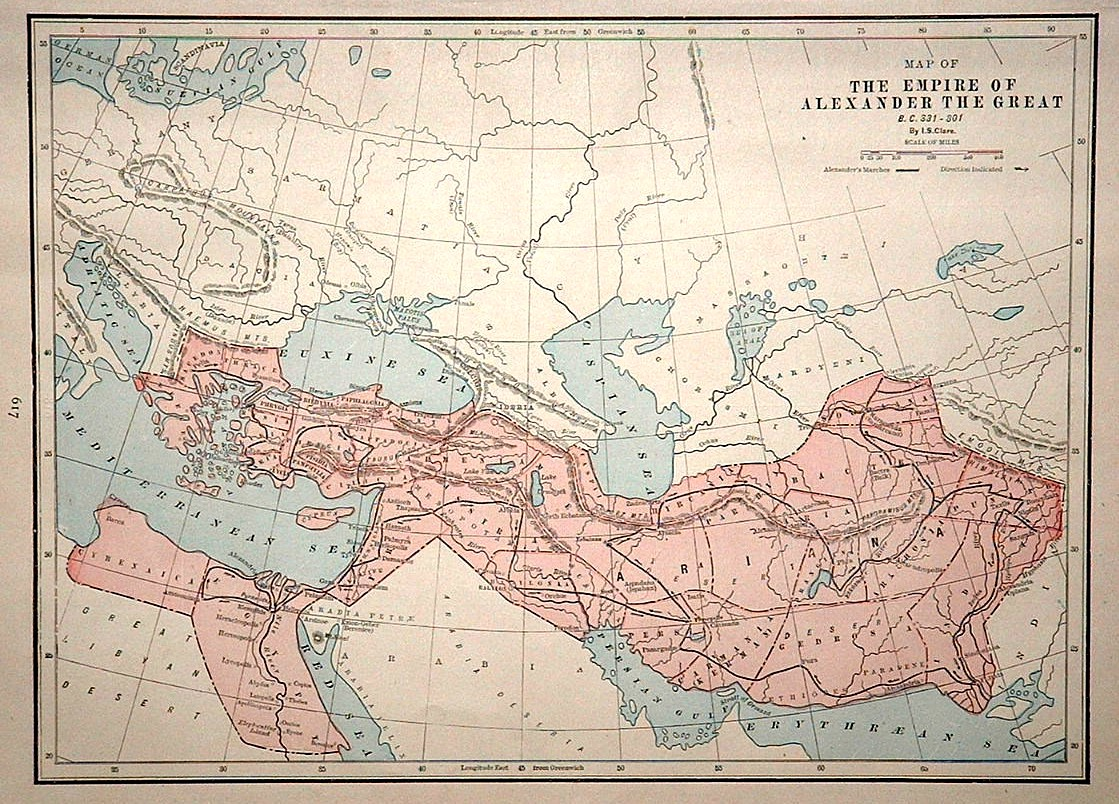
The full extent of the empire of Alexander the Great, assembled in the 4th century BCE as he strove to conquer the lands of Asia and the Mediterranean

Expansionism refers to states obtaining greater control of territories, especially through direct annexation of territory, through military empire-building (e.g. imperialism) or colonialism. In the classical age of conquest, the moral justification for territorial expansion at the direct expense of another established polity was often as unapologetic as "because we can", treading on the philosophical grounds of "might makes right".

As political conceptions of the nation state evolved, especially in reference to the inherent rights of the governed, more complex justifications arose. State-collapse anarchy, reunification or pan-nationalism are sometimes used to justify and legitimize expansionism when the explicit goal is to reconquer territories that have been lost or to take over ancestral lands. Lacking a viable historical claim of this nature, would-be expansionists may instead promote ideologies of promised lands, perhaps tinged with a self-interested pragmatism that targeted lands will eventually belong to the potential invader anyway.

== Theories ==
Ibn Khaldun wrote that newly established dynasties, because they have social cohesion or Asabiyyah, are able to seek "expansion to the limit." The Soviet economist Nikolai Kondratiev theorized that capitalism advances in 50-year expansion/stagnation cycles, driven by technological innovation. The UK, Germany, the US, Japan and now China have been at the forefront of successive waves. Crane Brinton in The Anatomy of Revolution saw the revolution as a driver of expansionism in, for example, Russia under Stalin, the United States and the Napoleonic Empire. Christopher Booker believed that wishful thinking can generate a "dream phase" of expansionism such as in the European Union, which is short-lived and unreliable. According to a 2023 study, important historical instances of territorial expansion have frequently happened because actors on the periphery of a state have acted without authorization from their superiors at the center of the state. Leaders subsequently find it difficult to withdraw from the newly captured areas due to "sunk costs, domestic political pressure, and national honor."

== Examples ==
Expansion of the Mongol Empire from 1206 to 1294

Every part of the world has experienced expansionism. The religious imperialism and colonialism of Islam started with the early Muslim conquests, was followed by the religious Caliphate expansionisms, and ended with the Partition of the Ottoman Empire. In the 15th and 16th centuries, the Ottoman Empire entered a period of expansion. The Ottomans ended the Eastern Roman Empire with the conquest of Constantinople in 1453 by Mehmed the Conqueror.

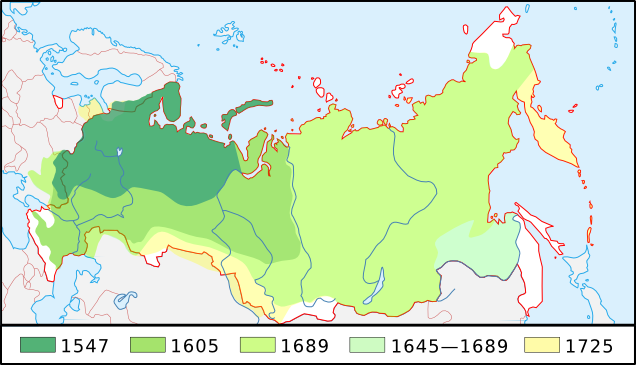
Expansion of the Tsardom of Russia from 1547 to 1725

The militarist and nationalistic reign of Russian Czar Nicholas I (1825–1855) led to wars of conquest against Persia (1826–1828) and Turkey (1828–1829). Various rebel tribes in the Caucasus region were crushed. A Polish revolt in 1830 was ruthlessly crushed. Russian troops in 1848 crossed into Austria-Hungary to put down the Hungarian Revolt. Russification policies were implemented to weaken minority ethnic groups. Pan-Slavist solidarity led to further war with the Ottoman Empire (the sick man of Europe) in 1853 provoked Britain and France into invading Crimea.

In Italy, Benito Mussolini sought to create a New Roman Empire, based around the Mediterranean. Italy invaded Ethiopia as early as 1935, Albania in early 1938, and later Greece. Spazio vitale ("living space") was the territorial expansionist concept of Italian Fascism. It was analogous to Nazi Germany's concept of Lebensraum and the United States' concept of "Manifest Destiny". Fascist ideologist Giuseppe Bottai likened this historic mission to the deeds of the ancient Romans.

After 1937, Nazi Germany under Hitler laid claim to Sudetenland, unification (Anschluss) with Austria in 1938 and the occupation of the whole of the Czech lands the following year. After war broke out, Hitler and Stalin divided Poland between Germany and the Soviet Union. In a Drang nach Osten aimed at achieving Lebensraum for the German people, Germany invaded the Soviet Union in 1941.

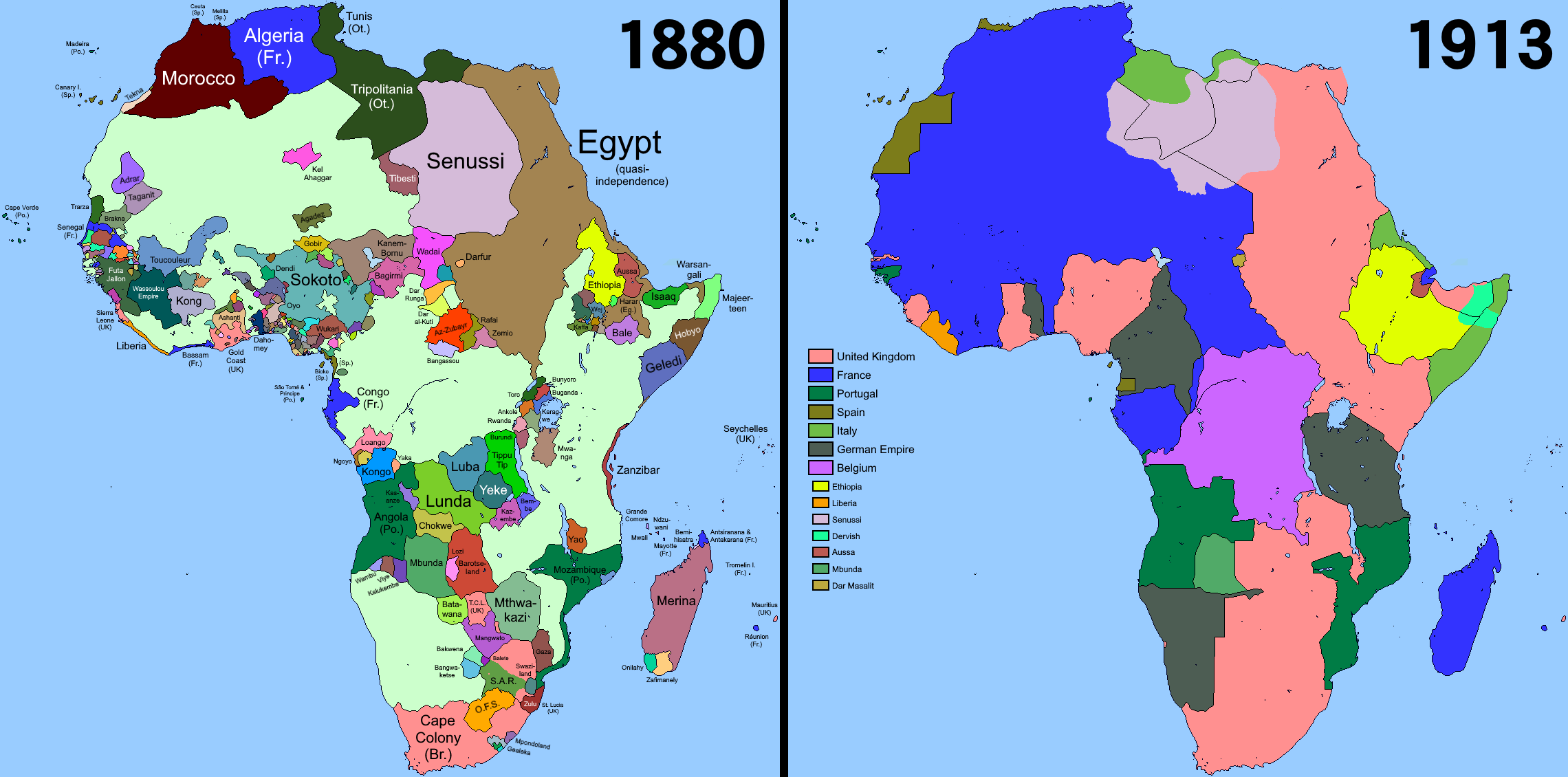
Comparison of Africa in the years 1880 and 1913

Expansionist nationalism is an aggressive and radical form of nationalism that incorporates autonomous patriotic sentiments with a belief in expansionism. The term was coined during the late 19th century as European powers indulged in the Scramble for Africa, but it has been most associated with militarist governments during the 20th century including Fascist Italy, Nazi Germany, the Empire of Japan, and the Balkan countries of Albania (Greater Albania), Bulgaria (Greater Bulgaria), Croatia (Greater Croatia), Hungary (Greater Hungary), Romania (Greater Romania) and Serbia (Greater Serbia).

In American politics after the War of 1812, Manifest Destiny was the ideological movement during America's expansion West. The movement incorporated expansionist nationalism with continentalism, with the Mexican War in 1846–1848 being attributed to it. Despite championing American settlers and traders as the people whom the government's military would be aiding, the Bent, St. Vrain and Company stated to be the most influential Indian trading company before the Mexican War, underwent a decline because of the and of traffic from American settlers by Beyreis. The company also lost the partner Charles Bent on January 19, 1847, to a riot caused by the Mexican War. Many in the Cheyennes, Comanches, Kiowas, and Pawnees tribes died from smallpox in 1839–1840, measles and whooping cough in 1845, and cholera in 1849, which had been brought by American settlers. The buffalo herds, sparse grasses, and rare waters were also depleted following the war as increased traffic by settlers moving to California during the Gold Rush.

== 21st century ==
=== Azerbaijan ===
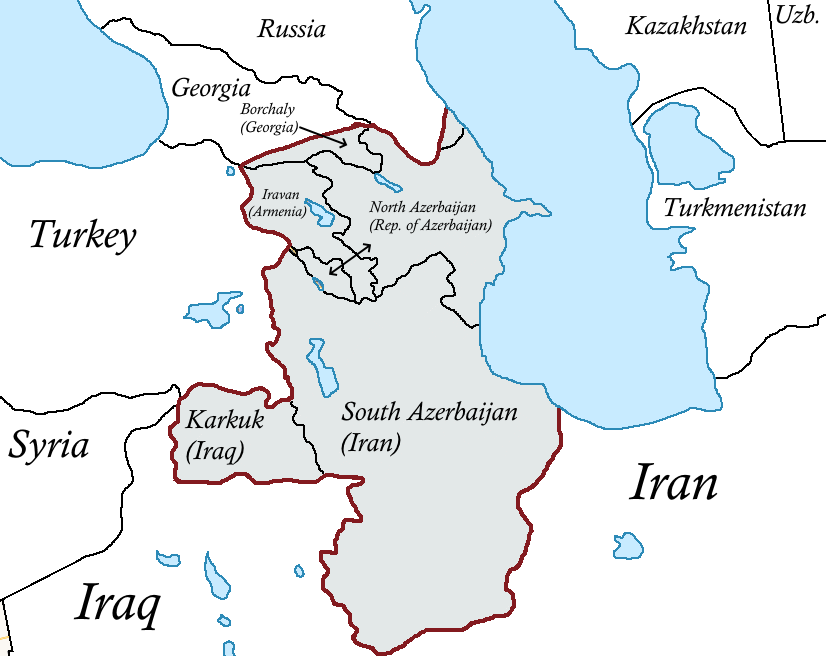
Map of "Whole Azerbaijan" according to Azerbaijani historian Adalet Tahirzade

The Government of Azerbaijan has advanced expansionist territorial claims to internationally recognized sovereign territories, including regions of Iran and significant portions, up to and including the entirety, of Armenia. These claims have been promoted under various labels, such as "Greater Azerbaijan", "Whole Azerbaijan", "Southern Azerbaijan", Expansionist claims targeting specifically Armenian territory include the "Goyche-Zangezur Republic", the "Republic of Irevan", "the Great Return", the "Zangezur Corridor", and "Western Azerbaijan".

=== China ===
The People's Republic of China has been described as expansionist through its operations and claims in the South China Sea, which are concurrently claimed in part by Vietnam, the Philippines, Brunei, Malaysia and the Republic of China.

=== Israel ===
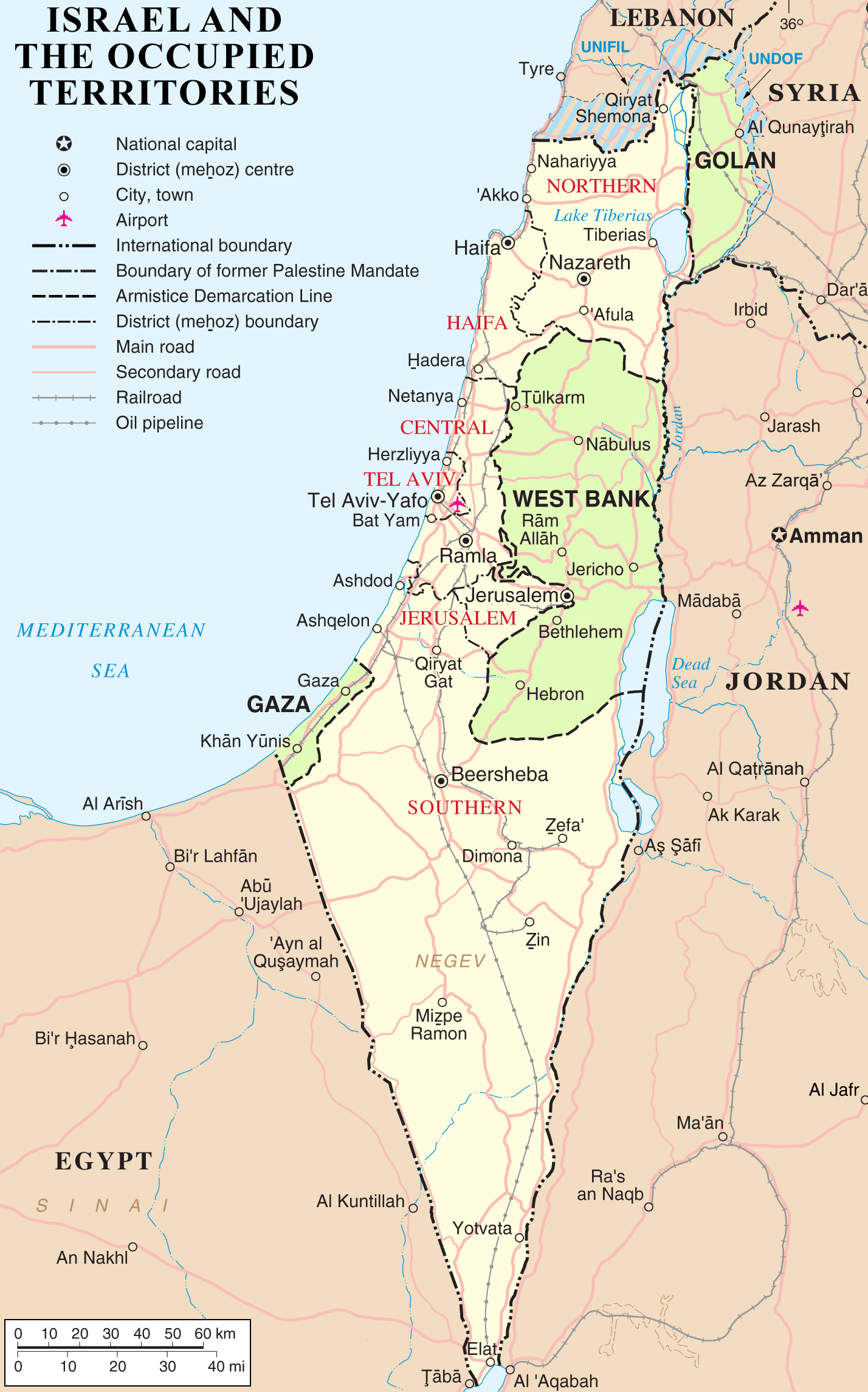
Israel and Israeli-occupied territories

Israel was established on May 14, 1948, following the end of World War II and the Holocaust. Its government has occupied the West Bank, the Gaza Strip, the Golan Heights, and the Sinai Peninsula since the Six-Day War, although the Sinai was later returned to Egypt in 1982. Israel also occupied southern Lebanon from February 1985 to May 2000.

=== Iran ===
Iran, the largest Shi'ite state, has extended its influence across the Middle East, specifically Yemen, Iraq, Syria, and Lebanon by arming local militias. Multiple analysts have regarded the Axis of Resistance as an expansionist "Islamist revolution" project by Iran.

=== Russia ===
Regions of Ukraine annexed by Russia in 2014 and 2022, with a red line marking the area of actual control by Russia on 30 September 2022

Russia under Vladimir Putin has been described as expansionist, especially since the 2010s. Putin said that the dissolution of the Soviet Union had "robbed" Russia of territories and made Russians "the biggest ethnic group in the world to be divided by borders", calling this an "outrageous historical injustice". Russia occupies parts of three neighboring countries. In 2008 Russia invaded Georgia and occupied Abkhazia and South Ossetia. In 2014 it occupied and then annexed Crimea from Ukraine. In 2022 it launched a full invasion of Ukraine and annexed its southeastern provinces. Meanwhile, Russia has established domination over Belarus. The Russian state is also accused of neo-colonialism in Africa, mainly through the activities of the Wagner Group and Africa Corps.

=== Turkey ===
Turkey's foreign policy is characterized, especially since 2010s by an aggressive expansionism, irredentism and interventionism in the Eastern Mediterranean and the neighboring Cyprus, Greece, Iraq, Syria, as well as in Africa, including Libya, and Nagorno-Karabakh. (Note: See:) Turkey has occupied foreign territories and stationed troops in them, following the 1974 Turkish invasion of Cyprus, the 2016 Turkish occupation of northern Syria, the 2018 Turkish presence in northern Iraq and following the 2020 Nagorno-Karabakh War.

=== United States ===
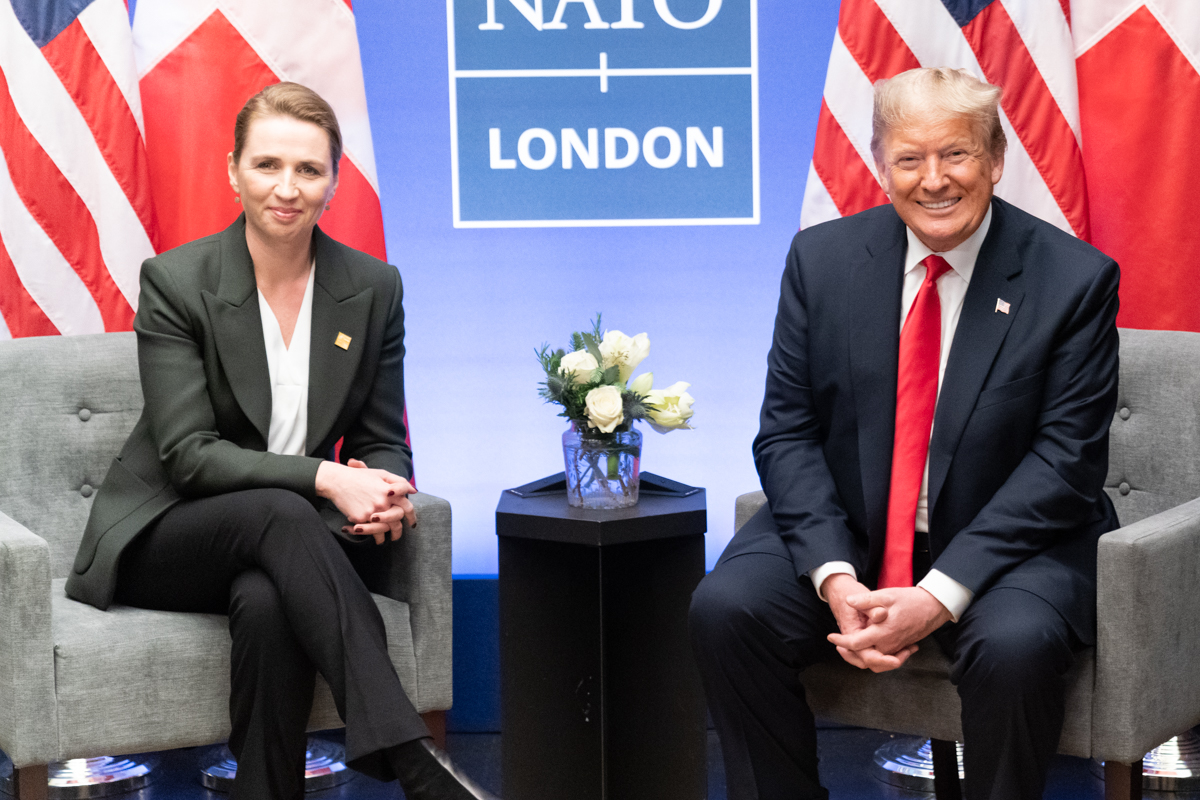
Trump with current Danish prime minister Mette Frederiksen in 2019

Donald Trump, the incumbent president of the United States, has stated in the lead-up to his second inauguration proposed plans and ideas that would expand the United States' political influence and territory. The last territory acquired by the United States came in 1947 with the Mariana, Caroline and Marshall Islands. In December 2024, Trump stated a further proposal for the United States to purchase Greenland from Denmark, describing ownership and control of the island as "an absolute necessity" for national security purposes. This builds upon a prior offer from Trump to buy Greenland during his first term, which the Danish Realm refused, causing him to cancel his August 2019 visit to Denmark. In 2024, Trump demanded that Panama return control of the Panama Canal to the United States due to 'excessive rates' being charged for American passage. If the United States were to take control of the Panama Canal, it would mark the first time the United States controlled Panamanian territory since the United States invasion of Panama.

On January 7, 2025, Trump's son Donald Trump Jr. visited Greenland's capital city Nuuk alongside Charlie Kirk to hand out MAGA hats. At a press conference the following day, Trump refused to rule out military or economic force order to take over Greenland or the Panama Canal; however, he ruled out military force in taking over Canada. On January 14, the Nelk Boys also visited Nuuk, handing out dollar bills to locals. On January 16, the CEOs of major Danish companies Novo Nordisk, Vestas and Carlsberg among others were assembled for a crisis meeting in the Ministry of State to discuss the situation. On the subsequent day, former chief executive Friis Arne Petersen in the Danish Ministry of Foreign Affairs described the situation as "historically unheard of", while Noa Redington, special adviser to former prime minister Helle Thorning-Schmidt, compared the international pressure on Denmark that during the 2005 Jyllands-Posten Muhammad cartoons controversy. Political commentator Henrik Qvortrup stated on the 17th that a mention of Greenland during Trump's inaugural address on January 20 would confirm Trump's seriousness, definitely making the situation the biggest international crisis for Denmark since World War II.

== Ideologies ==
In the 19th century, theories of racial unity evolved such as Pan-Germanism, Pan-Slavism, and Pan-Turkism and the related Turanism. In each case, the dominant nation (respectively, Prussia; the Russian Empire; and the Ottoman Empire, especially under Enver Pasha) used those theories to legitimise their expansionist policies.

=== American ideology ===
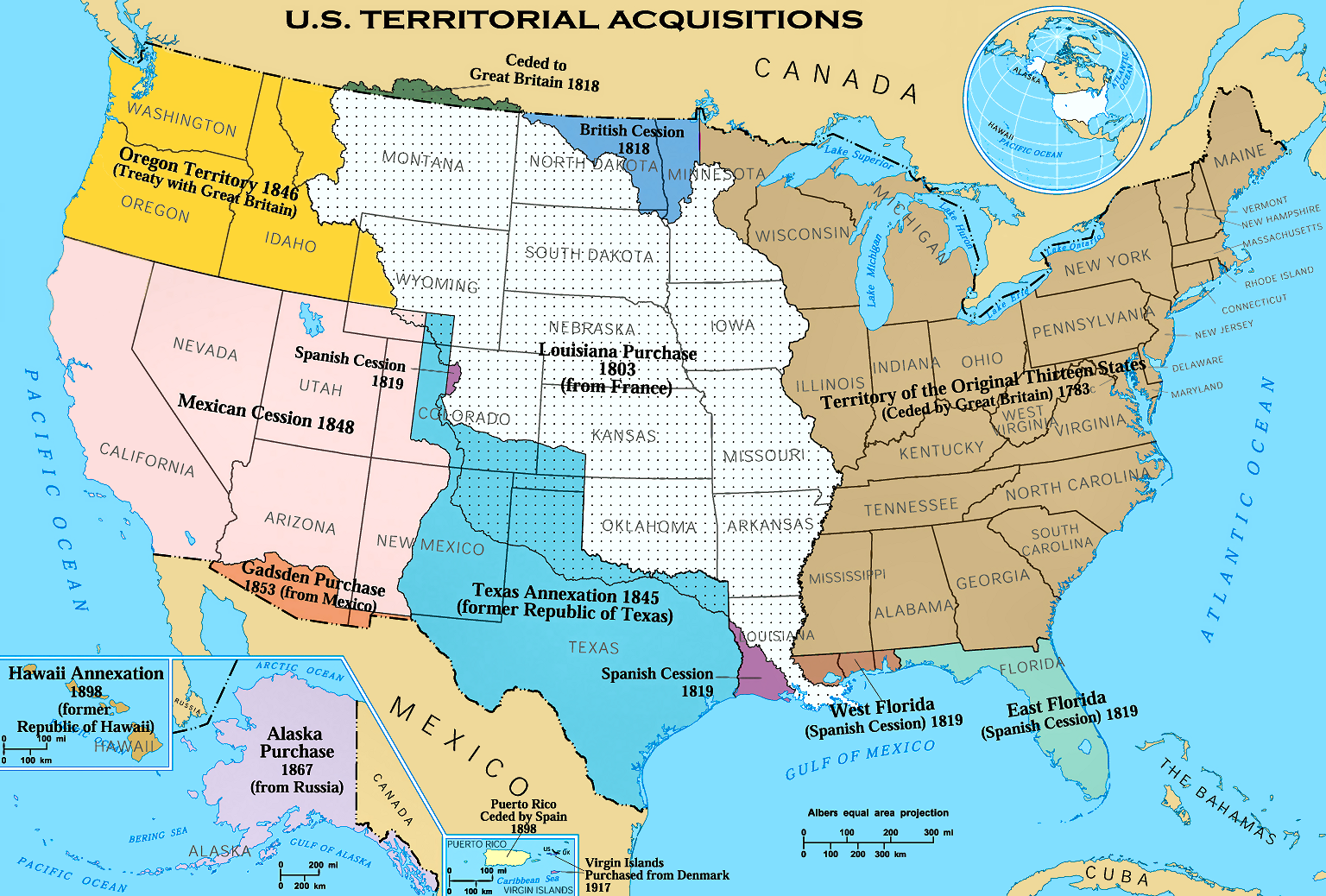
Historical territorial expansion of the United States

In terms of explaining the results of American expansion, this goes back to the 19th century when Frederick Jackson Turner produced his Frontier Thesis which made the case for the decisive role of American expansionism. The free land enabled economic independence (as opposed to political dominance by landlords in Europe) and popular democracy in America. The success of expansionism led to a deep belief in the superiority of the "American way of life," as shown by how it attracted tens of millions of immigrants. Economic success was supplemented by the confidence that Anglo Saxons were simply better at governing a nation.

Further expansion far beyond the American continent, in the Philippines, at the turn of the century which was driven by a paternalistic United States as McKinley's objectives, he declared in mid-1899, were fourfold: "Peace first, then a government of law and order honestly administered, full security to life, property, and occupation under the Stars and Stripes." However, the Philippines government was shared with the local political elite, which called for independence. In Washington Democrats rejected McKinley-style expansionism and in 1934 set the Philippines on the path to independence, which was achieved in 1946.

== In popular culture ==
George Orwell's satirical novel Animal Farm is a fictional depiction, based on Soviet Union under Stalin, of a new elite seizing power, establishing new rules and hierarchies, and expanding economically while they compromise their ideals. Robert Erskine Childers's novel The Riddle of the Sands portrays the threatening nature of the German Empire. Elspeth Huxley's novel Red Strangers shows the effects on local culture of colonial expansion into Sub-Saharan Africa. Philip K. Dick's novel The Man in the High Castle portrays a fictional version of the United States, which has been divided between Nazi Germany and the Empire of Japan. The portrayal is also shown in the television adaptation of the book.

== See also ==
- American imperialism
- British Empire
- French colonial empire
- Chinese imperialism
- Christianity and colonialism
- Colonialism
- Early Muslim conquests
- Ethnic cleansing
- European colonization of the Americas
- Expansionist nationalism
- Irredentism
- Japanese colonial empire
- List of irredentist claims or disputes
- Scramble for Africa
- Soviet empire
- Spread of Islam
- Russian imperialism
