= Shannon O'Neill =

Shannon O'Neill may refer to:

- Shannon O'Neill (politician)
- Shannon O'Neill (comedian)

== See also ==
- Shannon K. O'Neil, an American academic
