= Iranian sovereignty over the Strait of Hormuz =

Geopolitical dispute in 2026

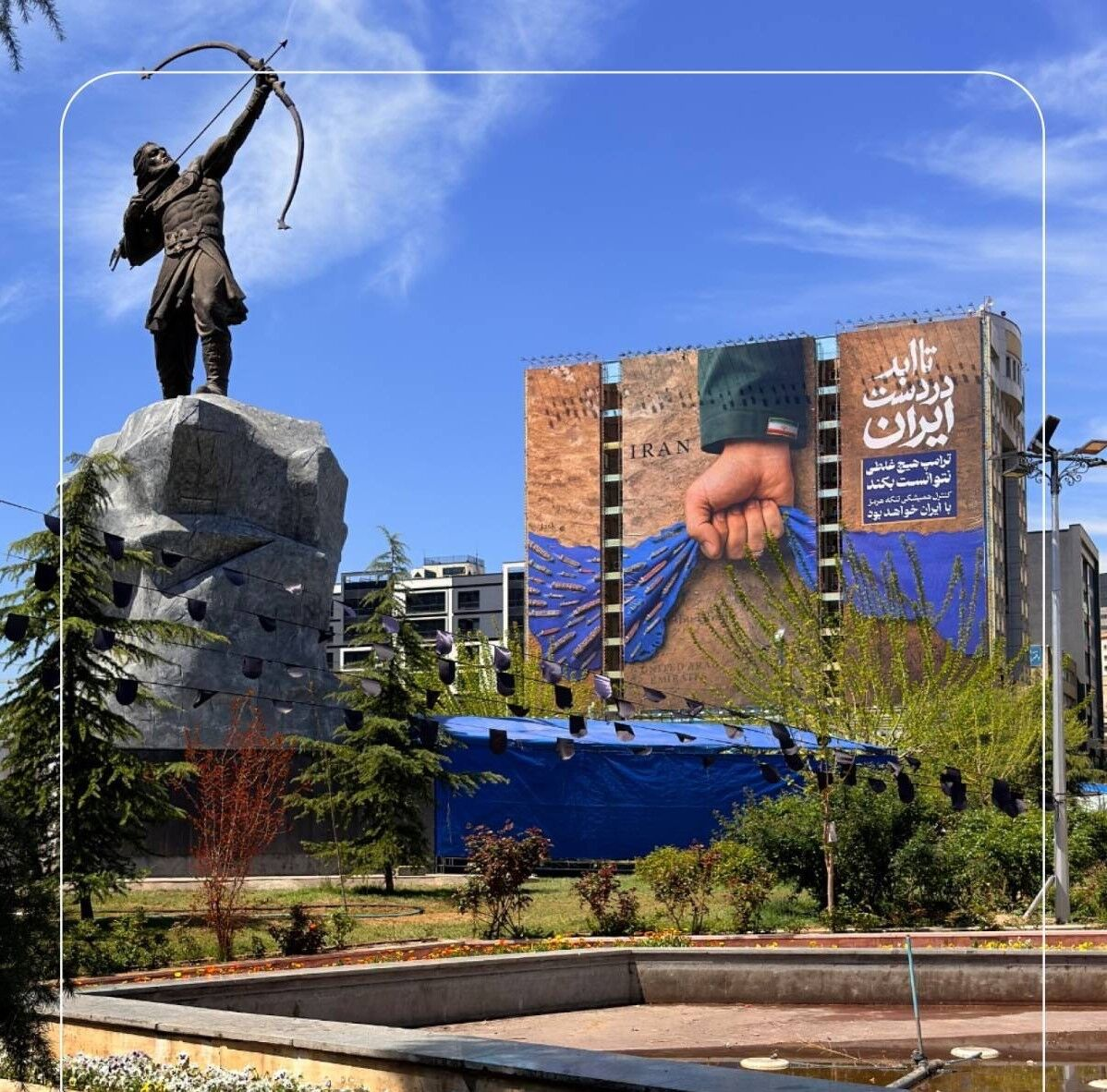
A mural in Tehran alluding to the Strait of Hormuz with the caption "Forever in Iran's Hands". On the left is a statue of Arash the Archer, an Iranian mythical hero who defined the country's border in the aftermath of the mythical Iran–Turan wars.

Following the 2026 war, Iran has asserted sovereignty over the Strait of Hormuz, increasing its total area and adding to its territorial waters. It has done this by regulating maritime traffic and collecting transit fees. Iran's claim of sovereignty over the strait clashes with international maritime norms and the United States's insistence on free passage, leading to ongoing geopolitical tensions with other Middle Eastern countries, continued military clashes with the US, and ongoing negotiations with Oman over joint management of the waterway to cement Iranian sovereignty over the Strait of Hormuz.

== Background ==
After the start of the 2026 Iran war, Iran occupied the Strait of Hormuz, declared sovereignty over it, and created the Persian Gulf Strait Authority. The US has made several failed attempts to militarily take control of the strait, clashing with the Islamic Revolutionary Guard Corps Navy. In August 2026, Trump announced that the US would annex the strait "pretty soon" after defeating the Iranian regime in the war. Iran rejected this as Trump's "delusions" and claimed that "The Islamic Republic of Iran is the owner and ruler of this important global waterway."

== Legal and geopolitical stance ==
Iran's attempt to assert sovereignty over the Strait of Hormuz has been compared to the Sound Dues, the tolls charged by Denmark for four centuries on ships entering or leaving the Baltic Sea. These tolls were abolished in 1857. Articles 26, 38, and 44 of the 1982 Law of the Sea Convention were designed to avoid similar tolls. Iran signed the Law of the Sea Convention but never ratified it, consistently rejecting standard transit–passage rules that guarantee unhindered international navigation through overlapping territorial waters.

On 30 March, the Iranian parliament passed a law to impose transit fees on commercial vessels passing through the Strait of Hormuz. Iran's government has justified the fees as war reparations for damage suffered during US–Israeli attacks on the country, as well as payment for "navigational services", environmental protection, and security. This has been compared to the Strait of Malacca, where Indonesia, Malaysia, and Singapore charge fees for navigation assistance, environmental protection, and search-and-rescue services, which is in accordance to the Article 43 of the Law of the Sea Convention, with the difference that these countries "have never claimed the right to stop a ship" and that nobody "pays them for permission".

US president Donald Trump has told ABC News that a toll fee is a "beautiful thing" and that he was considering it as a "joint venture" with Iran. Earlier, he floated the idea of the US charging tolls instead of Iran as the US is the "winner" of the war. Days later, the International Maritime Organization described the transit fee as a "dangerous precedent".

The US and other Western nations reject Iran's claims of sovereignty, insisting that the strait remains an international waterway open to toll-free commercial and military transit.

On 23 August, the Iranian Commission on National Security and Foreign Policy announced the passing of a bill to collect transit fees.

== Iran–Oman negotiations ==
Iran and Oman have held discussions to coordinate safe shipping corridors and establish a joint traffic coordination mechanism that respects the sovereign rights of both coastal states.

Proposed transit adjustments shift portions of shipping lanes closer to Iranian waters near Larak Island, rather than relying entirely on traditional corridors through Omani waters.

== Impact ==
Tensions over control of the Strait of Hormuz have triggered periodic military escalations, naval blockades, and disruptions to global energy markets.

== See also ==
- 2026 Iran war fuel crisis
