= 2026 Iran–Oman negotiations =

2026 talks between Iran and Oman on reopening shipping through the Strait of Hormuz

The 2026 Iran–Oman negotiations were a series of diplomatic talks between Iran and Oman aimed at establishing a new shipping route through the Strait of Hormuz, following the strait's closure amid the 2026 Iran war. The negotiations, mediated by Muscat and conducted over several months, produced an agreement in principle in early August 2026 on the coordinates of a proposed maritime corridor, though implementation still required approval from Iran's senior leadership.

== Background ==
Iran had closed the Strait of Hormuz, a critical passage for global energy shipments, amid its 2026 war with the United States and Israel. Oman, which has long served as a neutral mediator in regional diplomacy, previously hosted direct US–Iran nuclear talks in Muscat in February 2026, led on the Iranian side by Foreign Minister Abbas Araghchi and on the American side by envoy Steve Witkoff.

By late July and early August 2026, Iran said it was negotiating exclusively with Oman over a new shipping corridor, distinct from existing routes, while insisting the strait would never return to what it called its pre-war status. Tehran repeatedly denied that it was negotiating directly with Washington, even as US officials, including President Donald Trump and Secretary of State Marco Rubio, said the US was involved and that the strait would reopen "soon".

== Course of negotiations ==
Talks between Tehran and Muscat on reopening the strait ran for more than three weeks by early August, producing broad agreement on proposed inbound and outbound shipping routes, according to Iranian deputy foreign minister Kazem Gharibabadi. On 2 August, Araghchi told Iran's cabinet the negotiations were "on the way to being finalised," and Foreign Ministry spokesman Esmail Baghaei said Tehran and Muscat were nearing a deal on a new maritime route that would respect the sovereign rights of both countries.

On 5 August, Iran said it had reached an agreement with Oman on the geographical coordinates of the proposed route, with a joint statement setting out the main points under review and in the final drafting stage. Baghaei described the talks as "professional" and "progressing," while cautioning that a deal would be struck only if unspecified "third parties" did not obstruct the process. A Gulf official familiar with the talks put the odds of a finalized deal by Friday at 50–50.

On 26 August, the Islamic Revolutionary Guard Corps said Iran and Oman have agreed to share revenues from the Strait of Hormuz and define their respective maritime areas, while negotiations continue over reopening the waterway amid the war.

=== Proposed route ===
Under the arrangement described by people briefed on the talks, vessels would enter the strait through Iranian waters and exit mostly through Omani waters. Iran would reportedly send its own vessels, including oil tankers, through the waterway first to confirm it was clear of mines before opening it to other shipping. Sources briefed on the negotiations said Iran's senior leadership, including Supreme Leader Mojtaba Khamenei, had yet to approve the deal as of early August.

== US role ==
US officials described their involvement as focused on facilitating the Iran–Oman shipping talks as a step toward broader denuclearization negotiations with Tehran. Rubio said the US was involved in the negotiations on increasing safe ship traffic through the strait, calling it "the immediate deal" ahead of longer-term talks, and separately described "the denuclearization of Iran" as "the ultimate deal". Vice President JD Vance said any deal with Iran would "be messy" and take time, describing Iranian negotiators as "extraordinarily difficult" and citing Iran's "fractured system". Trump said discussions with Tehran were "very good".

== Reactions ==
Qatar called for freedom of navigation through the strait and for consensus among regional states on any arrangements governing it. Former Iranian foreign minister Mohammad Javad Zarif urged Tehran's leadership to use the diplomatic opening to negotiate from a position of strength, suggesting Iran build a coalition including Turkey, Saudi Arabia, Egypt, Pakistan, Qatar, Oman, Indonesia and Malaysia, while also repairing relations with Europe. Shipping analysts were reported to be more cautious than US Treasury Secretary Scott Bessent about the actual volume of tanker traffic currently transiting the strait.

== See also ==
- Iran–Oman relations
- Iranian sovereignty over the Strait of Hormuz
