= Genaro López =

Panamanian union leader and politician (born 1954)

Genaro López Rodríguez
- Born: 26 July 1954; Chitra, Calobre District, Veraguas Province, Panama
- Occupation: Politician

Genaro López Rodríguez (born 26 July 1954 in Chitra, Calobre District, Veraguas Province, Panama) is a Panamanian union leader and politician. He is best known as secretary-general of the building workers' union Suntracs, 1990–2010; as leader of the Frenadeso movement for economic and social rights; and as presidential candidate on behalf of the Broad Front for Democracy (Frente Amplio por la Democracia), party in the 2014 elections.

== Early life ==
His parents were María Salomé Rodríguez and Reynaldo López Alvarado. They were coffee growers, who later set up a village food store. Genaro López grew up in the village of Chitra, where he attended primary school. At the age of 18, he left the village and moved to Panama City.

== Worker and trade unionist ==
His first job in the city was maintenance work in a restaurant, but he soon left due to disagreements with his employer. Then, his uncle offered him work in the construction field. He worked as a builder in a number of construction projects during the 1970s. In 1976, he joined the Suntracs union, then a small voluntary group of builders, carpenters and refurbishers. While working for the Díaz y Guardia company, he achieved an increase in the membership of unions. After serving for several years as a union representative, in 1980 with the support of a number of workers' movements he joined the governing council of Suntracs, but later gave up his position due to that union's links with the Manuel Noriega dictatorship.

After this, López helped to create a campaign for democracy (Modec) within Suntracs, joining its general secretariat in 1987 during the political crisis in Panama at that time. After the dictatorship had fallen, on 15 February 1990 he was appointed secretary-general of Suntracs itself.

=== Leader of Suntracs ===
During his 20 years as leader of the union, its membership increased to 50,000, making it the largest union in Panama, and it achieved the most favourable collective bargaining agreement in Central America.

He led strikes and protests throughout five presidencies, and supported public sector workers who were dismissed after the 1990 coup attempt against Guillermo Endara. In 1995 he led a 13-day strike against changes to labour law under the Ernesto Pérez Balladares government, resulting in over 500 arrests and four deaths.

Strikes and protests headed by López continued through the governments of Mireya Moscoso, Martín Torrijos and Ricardo Martinelli. During Martinelli's presidency he took part in protests in 2010 against “Law 30”, which embraced controversial reforms in labour relations and penal, judicial and environmental legislation.

As leader of Suntracs, Genaro López opposed the economic measures of successive governments, which he regarded as “neo-liberalism”. In 2010, López did not seek re-election as secretary-general and on 26 August this position passed to Saúl Méndez.

== Presidential candidacy ==
On 10 September 2013 López put himself forward as presidential candidate for the recently formed left-wing party, Broad Front for Democracy (FAD). In the FAD primaries of 24 November, he was proclaimed the party's candidate with 71.5% of the vote, although turnout was very low at 8% of registered party members. His rivals had been the indigenous leader Celio Guerra who came second with 25.8% of the vote, Víctor Manuel Rodríguez with 1.7% and José Rodríguez Rayo with 0.91%.

As candidate for president he argued that the government and the main opposition were the same, and that the FAD was the legitimate representative of the people.

In the elections of May 2014, López won 10,914 votes or 0.59% of the total.

== Personal life ==
He is married to Clara Melina Bultrón, whom he met at the age of 21. They have two children, Darisbeth and Genaro López Bultrón.

== See also ==
- Politics of Panama
