= Never Give an Inch: Fighting for the America I Love =

2023 book by Mike Pompeo

Never Give an Inch: Fighting for the America I Love is a memoir by former United States Secretary of State Mike Pompeo. It was published on January 24, 2023 by Broadside Books.

== Contents ==
Pompeo claims that the media was trying to "fracture" Saudi Arabia–United States relations. He connects this to Crown Prince Mohammed bin Salman, saying the "progressive Left hates MBS, in spite of the fact that he is leading the greatest cultural reform in the Kingdom’s history." He describes Jamal Khashoggi, who was assassinated in 2018, as not a "journalist" (putting the word in air quotes) but a political activist. Khashoggi's murder sparked outrage in multiple countries.

A chapter is also dedicated to the execution of the planning and operation to kill Qasem Soleimani, the former commander of the Quds Force of the Iranian Revolutionary Guard Corps. Pompeo wrote that he had raised the proposal to kill Soleimani to President Donald Trump.

In the book, he praises Volodymyr Zelenskyy, Benjamin Netanyahu and Jair Bolsonaro. He adds that he is "troubled by the evil that has befallen [Zelenskyy's] country" of Ukraine, a year into the 2022 Russian invasion. He says he is "encouraged" that Zelenskyy had evolved from a comedian "into a kind of General Patton". He criticizes Pope Francis and the Catholic Church over relations with China, as well as the reformist Pope John XXIII and liberation theology movement of the 1970s.

Pompeo also accuses the "left" of exploiting the January 6 Capitol attack but does not mention Trump's personal involvement in the event. With regards to Nikki Haley, he describes her former tenure as United States Ambassador to the United Nations as "a job that is far less important than people think".
