= SUNTRACS =

Panama trade union

- National Union of Workers of Construction and Similar Industries
- Sindicato Único Nacional de Trabajadores de la Industria de la Construcción y Similares
- Founded: September 10, 1972; 53 years ago
- Location: Panama
- Members: 40,000
- Key people: Genaro López (Secretary-General)
- Affiliations: CONUSI
- Website: suntracspanama.com

SUNTRACS (National Union of Workers of Construction and Similar Industries; Spanish: El Sindicato Único Nacional de Trabajadores de la Industria de la Construcción y Similares) is one of the leading trade union forces in Panama, with 40,000 members and a militant style of class war unionism. It is the leader union within Coordinadora de Unidad Sindical (CONUSI), the most radical of the major union federations in Panama.

Led by Genaro López, SUNTRACS has initiated three general strikes in the past few years, and has been the instrumental force within FRENADESO, the national coalition to prevent the privatization of Panama's social security. It has been closely connected with radical leftist groups and Padre Conrado Sanjur, an important local figure in liberation theology.

The union campaigns for the on-the-job safety of its members. There have been many deaths and injuries in the Panamanian construction industry due to unsafe working conditions, and SUNTRACS works to improve conditions and prevent further casualties.

In 2014, SUNTRACS members working on the Panama Canal expansion project engaged in a two-week strike, gaining an 11% pay increase over their previous US$3.99 per hour wage.
