= Noa Redington =

Swedish journalist (born 1971)

- Born: 12 September 1971 (age 54); Stockholm Sweden
- Occupations: Journalist, Spin doctor
- Spouse: Liselotte Lyngso
- Website: https://www.noaredington.dk/

Noa Redington (born 12 September 1971) is a Danish journalist who served as an advisor to Helle Thorning-Schmidt from 2008 to 2015. He holds a degree in Political Science from the University of Copenhagen and has also studied at Columbia University.

== Career ==
He was a member of the board of the National Organization of Students (LOE) from 1986 to 1987.

He has been a debate editor at Weekendavisen, information officer at the Ministry of Economic Affairs, analyst at LO's Ugebrevet A4 and was the editor of Ugebrevet Mandag Morgen. He was also a pundit for TV 2 News and Politiken.
