= United States territorial acquisitions table =

Following are the historical territorial acquisitions of the United States:

Accession	Date	Area (sq.mi.)	Area (km^{2}.)	Cost in dollars
Original territory of the Thirteen States (western lands, roughly between the Mississippi River and Appalachian Mountains, were claimed but not administered by the states and were all ceded to the federal government or new states by 1802)	1783	892,135	2,310,619	—
Annexation of the Vermont Republic	1791	9,616	24,905	—
Louisiana Purchase, from France	1803	827,987	2,144,476	$15,000,000
Texas annexation	1845	389,166	1,007,935	—
Oregon Territory, by treaty with Great Britain	1846	286,541	742,137	—
Mexican Cession, from Mexico	1848	529,189	1,370,593	$15,000,000
Gadsden Purchase, from Mexico	1854	29,670	76,845	$10,000,000
Baker Island, unincorporated territory claimed under Guano Act of 1856	1857	0.5	1.29	—
Howland Island, unincorporated territory claimed under Guano Act of 1856	1857	0.6	1.55	—
Jarvis Island, unincorporated territory claimed under Guano Act of 1856	1857	1.7	4.4	—
Johnston Atoll, unincorporated territory claimed under Guano Act of 1856	1857	1.1	2.85	—
Alaska Purchase, from Russia	1867	591,000	1,723,336	$7,200,000
Midway Islands, annexation of unoccupied area	1867	2	5.18	—
Annexation of the Republic of Hawaii	1898	6,450	16,705	—
Philippines, purchased from Spain (Full independence was granted in July, 1946)	1898	115,800	299,921	$20,000,000
Puerto Rico, by treaty with Spain	1898	3,508	9,085	—
Guam, by treaty with Spain	1898	209	541	—
Eastern Samoa, by treaty with Great Britain and Germany	1899	76	197	—
Panama Canal Zone, by treaty with Panama	1903	553	1,432	$10,000,000 (plus $250,000 annually)
Guantánamo, by treaty with Cuba	1903	45	116.5	$3,386.25 (rent annually)
Annexation of the Indian Territory	1906	31,069	80,468	—
Danish Virgin Islands (excluding Water Island), by purchase from Denmark	1917	136	352	$25,000,000
Kingman Reef, annexed	1922	0.4	|—	
Swains Island, annexed	1925	0.94	2.43	—
Kanton Island and Enderbury Island, joint occupation with Britain (Independent as Republic of Kiribati in 1979)	1938	6.5	16.8	—
Water Island, by purchase from the East Asiatic Company, a private shipping company based in Denmark (which at the time was under German occupation)	1944	0.8	2.0	$10,000
Mariana Islands, United Nations Trust Territory; self-governing as Northern Mariana Islands	1947	179	467	—
Caroline Islands, United Nations Trust Territory; 1986 most islands adopt commonwealth status as Federated States of Micronesia	1947	500	1,295	—
Marshall Islands, United Nations Trust Territory; 1979 self-governing; 1986 independent as Republic of the Marshall Islands	1947	70	181	—

For information on internal territorial acquisitions, see List of U.S.–Native American treaties.
