= Shannon K. O'Neil =

Academic

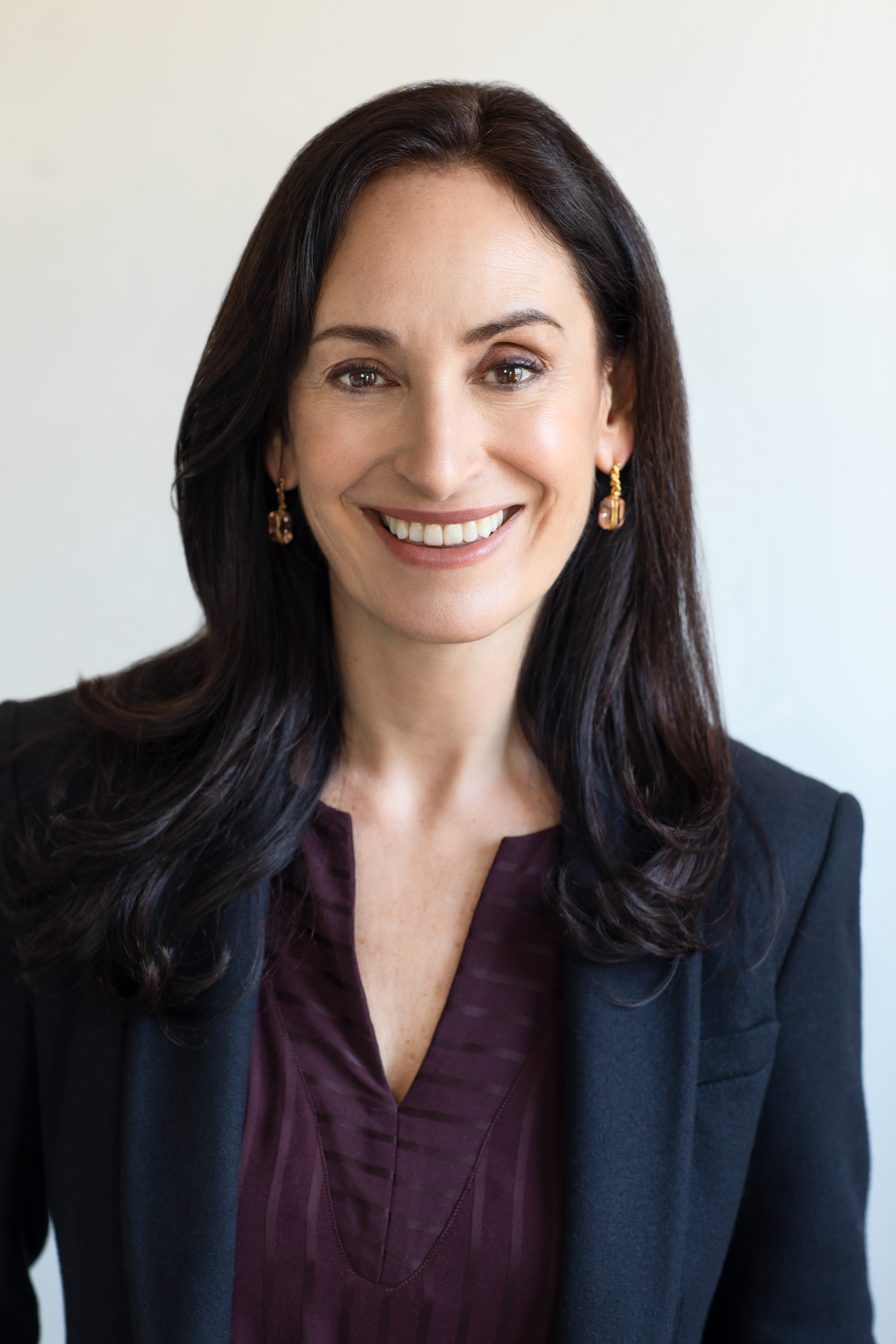
- O'Neil in 2022

Shannon K. O'Neil is the senior vice president, director of studies, and Maurice R. Greenberg chair at the Council on Foreign Relations (CFR), a nonpartisan foreign-policy think tank and membership organization. She is an expert on global trade, supply chains, and industrial policy, as well as on Latin America, U.S.-Mexico relations, corruption, democracy, and immigration.

== Education ==
O'Neil holds a BA from Yale University, an MA in international relations from Yale University, and a PhD in government from Harvard University. She was a justice, welfare and economics fellow at Harvard University, and a Fulbright Scholar in Mexico and Argentina.

== Career ==
In addition to her work at CFR, O'Neil has taught in the political science department at Columbia University. Before turning to policy, O'Neil worked in the private sector as an equity analyst at Indosuez Capital Latin America and Credit Lyonnais Securities. She is a member of the board of directors of the Tinker Foundation. O'Neil has testified before Congress on U.S.-Mexico relations, immigration, corruption, and drug trafficking. O'Neil is a frequent guest on national broadcast and news programs. and regularly speaks at global academic, business, and policy conferences.

== Publications ==
O’Neil is the author of The Globalization Myth: Why Regions Matter (Yale University Press, 2022), which chronicles the rise of three main global manufacturing and supply chain hubs and what they mean for U.S. economic competitiveness. She also wrote Two Nations Indivisible: Mexico, the United States, and the Road Ahead (Oxford University Press, 2013), which analyzes the political, economic, and social transformations Mexico has undergone over the last three decades and why they matter for the United States. She is a columnist for Bloomberg Opinion, and her work has appeared in Foreign Affairs, Americas Quarterly, and Foreign Policy, among others.
